= Tropical Storm Lionrock (2021) =

Pacific tropical storm in 2021

Tropical Storm Lionrock (Lannie)
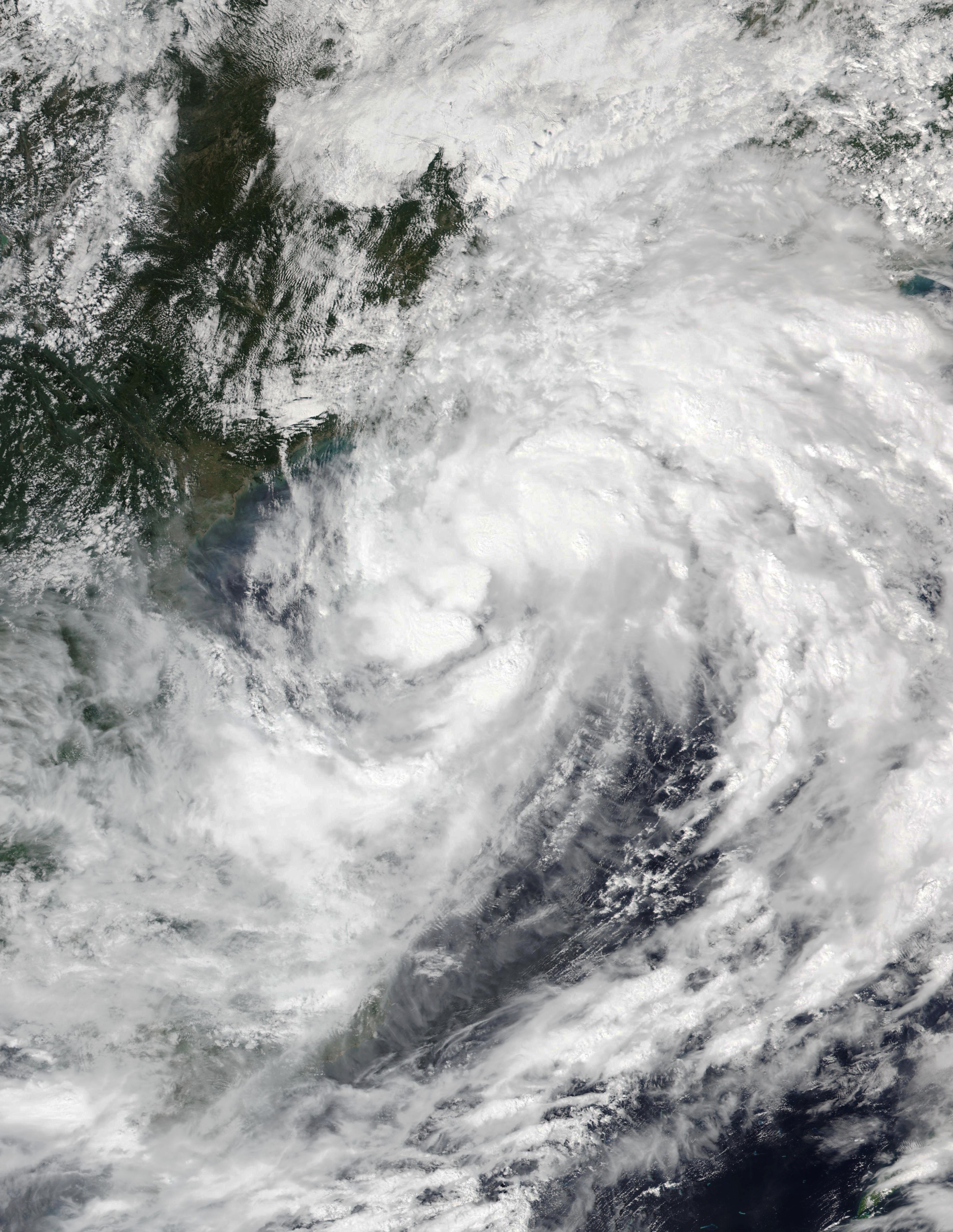
- Lionrock approaching Hainan on October 8, 2021

Meteorological history
- Formed: October 5, 2021
- Dissipated: October 10, 2021

Tropical storm
- 10-minute sustained (JMA)
- Highest winds: 65 km/h (40 mph)
- Lowest pressure: 994 hPa (mbar); 29.35 inHg

Tropical storm
- 1-minute sustained (SSHWS/JTWC)
- Highest winds: 85 km/h (50 mph)
- Lowest pressure: 989 hPa (mbar); 29.21 inHg

Overall effects
- Fatalities: 8 total
- Damage: $74.9 million (2021 USD)
- Areas affected: Philippines, Vietnam, Mainland China (particularly Hainan), Hong Kong, Macau
- IBTrACS
- Part of the 2021 Pacific typhoon season

Tropical Storm Lionrock, known in the Philippines as Tropical Depression Lannie, was a weak and slow-moving tropical cyclone which caused some damage to the Philippines, Vietnam, and South China in early October 2021. Lionrock was the seventeenth named storm of the 2021 Pacific typhoon season. It formed as an area of convection on October 2, then passed through the Philippines two days later. The system emerged to the South China Sea and had further development. On October 7, the system strengthened to Tropical Storm Lionrock, and made landfall in Hainan on the following day. It moved slowly over the island, and later emerged to the Gulf of Tonkin. Lionrock made landfall in Vietnam on October 10 and dissipated later that day.

Lionrock killed eight people along its path: Four in the Philippines, and two in Hong Kong and Vietnam respectively, and damages related to the storm was $74.9 million (2021 USD).

== Meteorological history ==
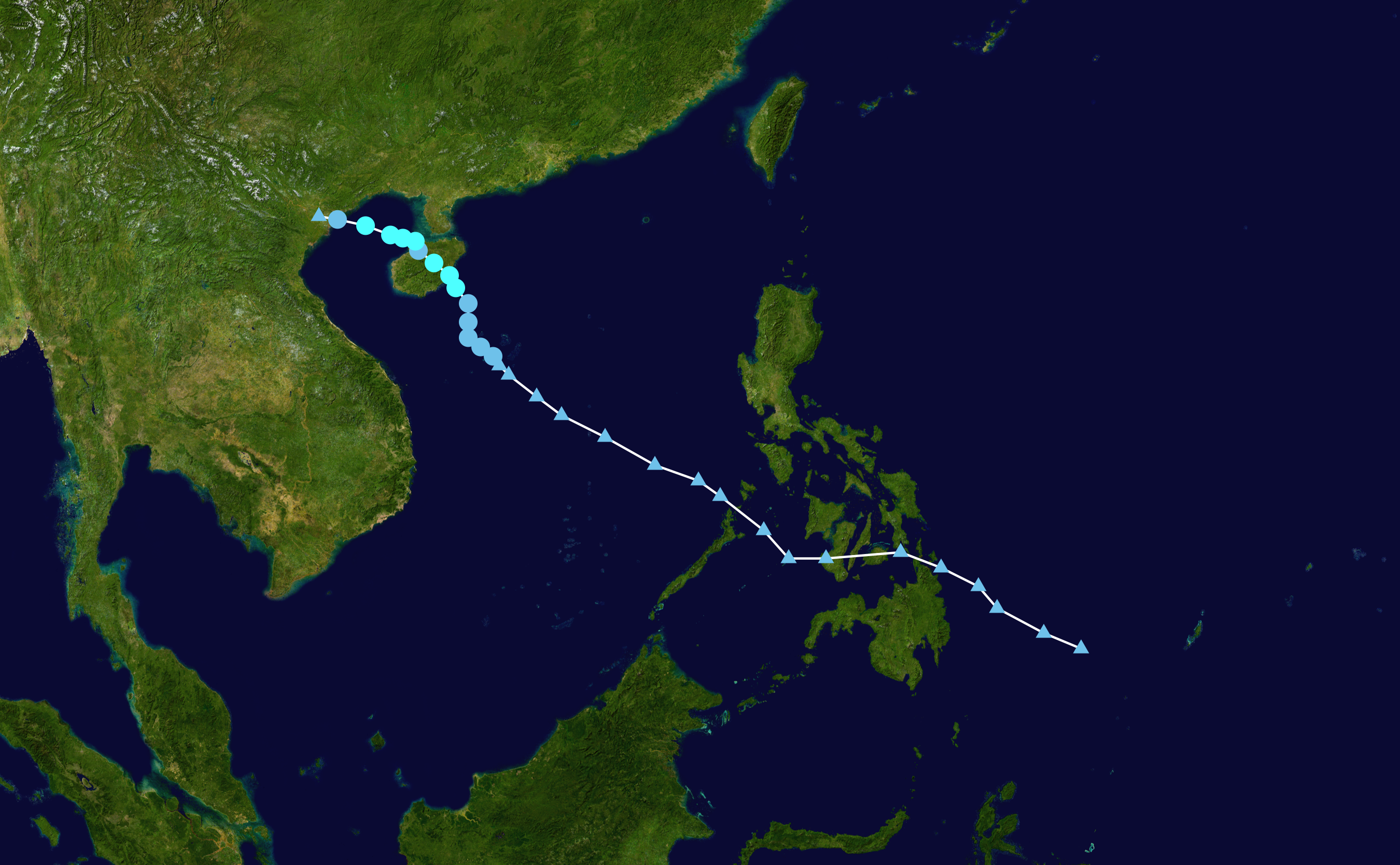
Map plotting the storm's track and intensity, according to the Saffir–Simpson scale Map key Saffir–Simpson scale Tropical depression (≤38 mph, ≤62 km/h) Tropical storm (39–73 mph, 63–118 km/h) Category 1 (74–95 mph, 119–153 km/h) Category 2 (96–110 mph, 154–177 km/h) Category 3 (111–129 mph, 178–208 km/h) Category 4 (130–156 mph, 209–251 km/h) Category 5 (≥157 mph, ≥252 km/h) Unknown Storm type Tropical cyclone Subtropical cyclone Extratropical cyclone, remnant low, tropical disturbance, or monsoon depression

On October 2 at 06:00 UTC, the United States Joint Typhoon Warning Center (JTWC) (Note: The Joint Typhoon Warning Center is a joint United States Navy – United States Air Force task force that issues tropical cyclone warnings for the western Pacific Ocean and other regions.) started to monitor a persistent area of convection in the Philippine Sea, located 495 nautical miles (917 km; 570 mi) to the east of Davao City, Philippines. At that time, satellite visible imagery revealed a disorganized but broad area of circulation with flaring strong thunderstorms. Later analysis by the agency indicated a favorable environment for further development of the system, with warm 30 °C (86 °F) sea surface temperatures, low wind shear and good equatorial outflow. Meanwhile, the Philippine Atmospheric, Geophysical and Astronomical Services Administration (PAGASA) upgraded the system to a tropical depression on 2:00 PHT (18:00 UTC) of October 3, assigning it the name Lannie from their naming list as it was already present in their Philippine Area of Responsibility. Also that day, the JTWC issued a Tropical Cyclone Formation Alert on the system as it showed enough convection on the west of a discernible low-level circulation center while tracking west-northwestward.

However, a trough associated with the disturbance crossed the Philippines, the JTWC subsequently canceled their TCFA on the system and lowered the probability of the system's development to "medium". The PAGASA, however, continued to track Lannie as it made 8 landfalls in the country; first at 04:30 PHT (20:00 UTC) on Bucas Grande Island, then on Cagdianao in the Dinagat Islands, then over Liloan and Padre Burgos in Southern Leyte, then Mahanay Island and Getafe in Bohol, San Fernando in Cebu then over Guihulngan, Negros Oriental before emerging into the Sulu Sea. Continuing its track to the west-northwest, it made two more landfalls in Palawan; one on Iloc Island in Linapacan and over El Nido before finally moving over and accelerated into the South China Sea. At 14:30 UTC of October 4, the JTWC reissued a TCFA once again on the system as it reorganized along with a conducive environment in the area. A day later at 06:00 UTC, the Japan Meteorological Agency (JMA) (Note: The Japan Meteorological Agency is the official Regional Specialized Meteorological Center for the western Pacific Ocean.) recognized the system in their bulletins as a tropical depression. Lannie exited the PAR at 11:00 PHT (03:00 UTC) on October 6 as it slightly inclined northwestward.

On October 7 at 09:00 UTC, the JTWC further upgraded the storm to a tropical depression, receiving the designation 22W from the agency. The system, at that time, also consolidated further while transitioning to a monsoon depression as it continued to maintain a broad center with its wind field contracting along with 25-30 knot winds occurring in its core. Meanwhile, while centered over the northern Paracel Islands, the JMA reported that the system intensified to a tropical storm according to surface wind analysis and Dvorak ratings, nine hours later. The agency named the system Lionrock while the storm became stationary due to weak steering flow. (Note: The name Lionrock was contributed by Hong Kong and refers to Lion Rock, the name of a peak.) However, the JTWC only followed suit on the next day as it turned northward as it was steered by the southwestern periphery of a subtropical ridge located to the northeast. The storm maintained this intensity before making landfall over Qionghai on 22:50 CST (14:50 UTC), further organizing its LLCC and its overall structure while located inland. It subsequently reintensified to its peak winds of 40 knots (75 km/h; 45 mph), ten minutes later. However, it weakened slightly while over the central part of the island, although its convective banding continued to consolidate.

Early on October 9, Lionrock emerged into the very warm and conducive waters of the Gulf of Tonkin. However, it maintained its intensity of 35 knots (65 km/h; 40 mph) before it made its last landfall over Haiphong, near Cat Bi International Airport on 09:00 UTC on the next day, with the JTWC issuing its final warning as a tropical depression. Although, its LLC remained somewhat defined on radar imagery but its winds weakened upon moving inland. The JMA also downgraded Lionrock to a depression three hours back as it tracked westward while over Quảng Ninh Province of Vietnam.

== Preparations and impacts ==
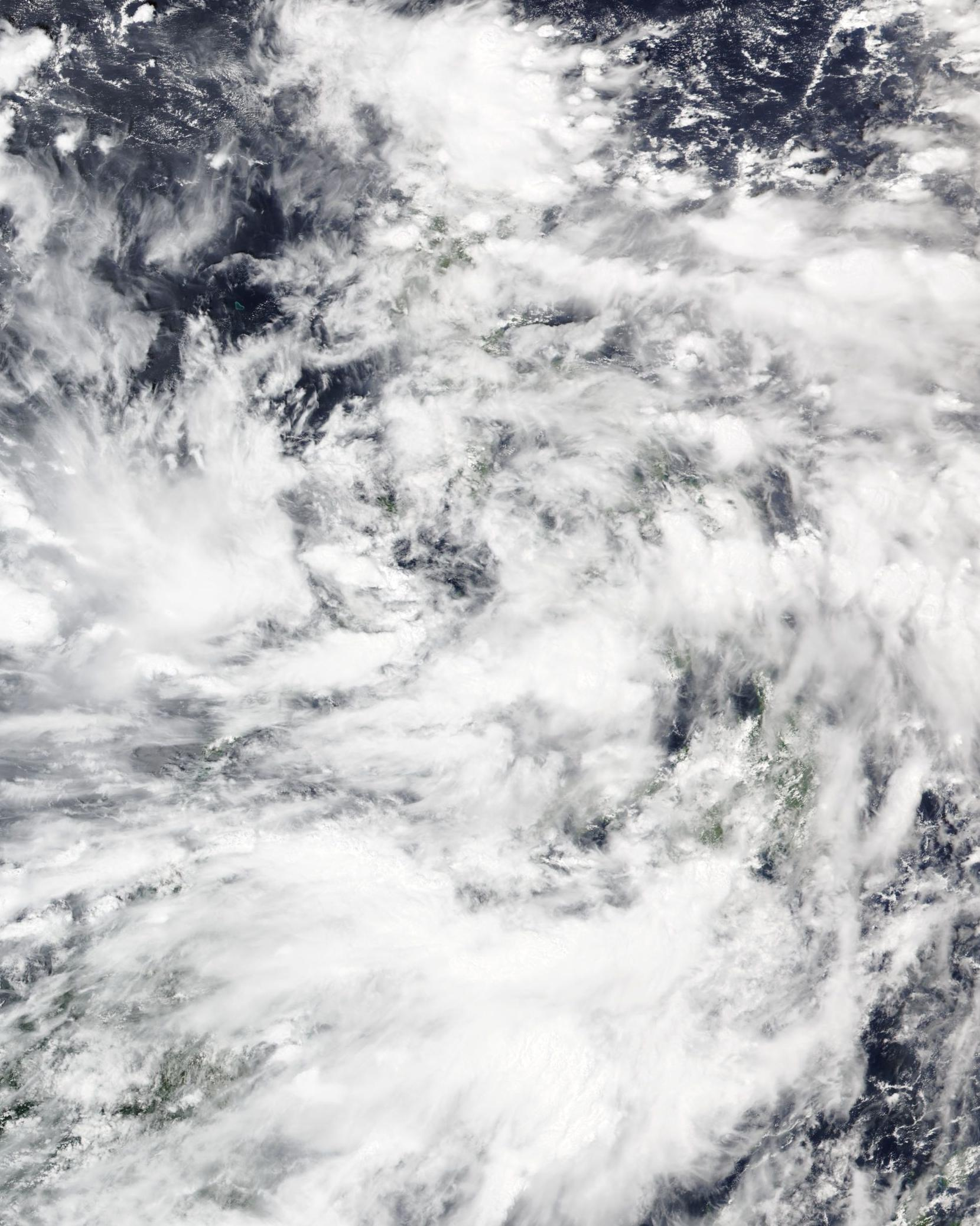
The precursor of Lionrock over the Philippines on October 4

=== Philippines ===
Upon the PAGASA's designation for the storm, several areas in Mimaropa, whole Visayas and northeastern Mindanao were placed under storm signal #1. The weather agency also warned flash floods, heavy rains, landslides and gusty winds from Lannie as the system moved over the country. Gale warnings were also in effect.

Metro Manila and some provinces in Luzon, including Isabela and Cagayan experienced heavy downpours from the "trough extension" of Lannie. In Siraway, Zamboanga del Norte, some residents living in the area were evacuated due to the same effect, causing waistline floods while nearly 200 families in Pikit, Cotabato City were rescued due to rain-induced flash floods that occurred from October 3–4. A family of three were also moved into safety by the Philippine Coast Guard (PCG) on October 4 when their boat sank during the high waves from the storm between Pamilacan Island and Loay, Bohol while two more fishermen were rescued by the authorities off Abacan River in Cortes. In Tanjay, a man slipped into a spillway and were subsequently helped by stranded residents near the area while 50 households were evacuated to safety as a river overflowed in Bais, Negros Oriental. Landslides were also reported on Cebu City and Talisay City while vaccination activities for October 5 on Zamboanga City were canceled as a result of bad weather and its resultant flooding in houses and rice fields. Five vessels and fifteen passengers in Palawan were stranded as a result of Lannie, the PCG reported on the same day.

Four fatalities were already reported in the country as a result of the storm, three due to drowning in Capiz and Cebu and the other one is for unknown reason in Balasan. Damages in Western Visayas were calculated to be at ₱1.6 million (US$31,600). According to the National Disaster Risk Reduction and Management Council (NDRRMC), 248 persons were displaced by Lannie and 1,701 families (8,048 individuals) were affected. 10 roadways were also disrupted and 77 seaports canceled sea operations. 19 houses and over 942.03 ha (2,327.8 acres) of farmland were damaged. Total damages from the storm were stood at ₱12.2 million (US$241,000) as of October 7.

=== Hong Kong and Macau ===
Despite Lionrock being far away from Hong Kong and Macau, its large windfield prompted a Strong Wind Signal No. 3 for the territories. Further, it was upgraded to No. 8 Southeast Gale or Storm Signal on October 9 and it lasted 22 hours before being beaten by Kompasu a few days later at 23 hours and 20 minutes. In addition, Lionrock was 560 km away from Hong Kong when it triggered the issuance of Signal 8 by the HKO beating the previous record held by Nangka the year before at 450 km.

On October 8, a 52-year old Frenchman was killed while his 57-year old friend was injured when their sailboats sank due to strong winds from the storm off Po Toi Island, Beaufort Island in Hong Kong. A tree uprooted in Tsuen Wan-bound Lung Cheung Road, disrupting a lane while downed trees also affected Kowloon City, Prince Edward Road West and Cheung Fai Road in Tsing Yi. Scaffolding also fell on a street in Wong Tai Sin and over Broadwood Road due to strong winds from Lionrock, trapping two people in their respective cars. Two female workers were also stranded inside. They were rescued subsequently by authorities, with one of them being unconscious. She died subsequently, being the second casualty from the storm in the territory. On October 9, Ngong Ping recorded winds of 105 km/h (65 mph) and gusts of 139 km/h (86 mph) while the territory recorded 329.7 mm (12.98 in) of rainfall on October 8. The direct economic loss was estimated at HK$220 million (US$28.3 million).

In Macau, six people suffered slight injury in related to the storm, but overall effects were minimal.

=== Mainland China ===
Emergency response teams with 95 vehicles, 2,471 people, 438 emergency repair vehicles and 358 generators were put on standby as Lionrock approached Hainan Island. The area's electric company also trimmed tree branches as a precaution for blackouts. 12 bus lines passing over the university town in Haikou were suspended as a result of the storm while the Haikou Crater Park were closed starting on October 8. 290 drainage workers also inspected drainage facilities on Hainan on October 8 while 75 individuals from Longhua District were relocated from their houses to a safe place to ride out the storm. Over 3,434 people from the area were evacuated while more than 20,000 fishing boats and vessels were asked to return to ports due to Lionrock. A blue warning was issued for mainland southeastern China, on the same day.

In Zhuhai, heavy rainfall fell due to Lionrock in various places, with 687.1 millimetres (27.05 in) being recorded from October 8 to 10 in Wanshan Town, leading to the storm being one of the wettest tropical cyclones ever recorded, in mainland China. Guangdong-Macao Intensive Cooperation Zone in Hengqin reported a rain accumulation of 240.9 millimetres (9.48 in) on October 10, Xiangzhou District at 237.2 millimetres (9.34 in) and Huangmaozhou Island at 228.0 millimetres (8.98 in) on that day. Many roadways were flooded and impassable, causing the cancellation of buses and the restriction of residents in the area. More than 60 shelters were also opened in Xiangzhou for possible evacuees. Traffic authorities on the area implemented traffic control from October 10. Ship activities were also suspended. Hengqin Bridge were also closed for motorists due to heavy downpours. Power in the city were also cut as a precaution; its electric company Zhuhai Power Supply Bureau promised that electricity will be restored as conditions become better.

In Zhongshan, rainfall exceeding 100 millimetres (3.9 in) were reported on Tanzhou, Sanxiang and other places in its south while the Wugai Mountain at over 70 millimetres (2.8 in). Primary and secondary schools in some districts were closed as a result. Authorities in the area performed several rescues on people being stranded in floods and those who can't evacuate themselves. Cars were also inundated by these floods. 165 people in total were rescued and 65 were evacuated to safety. The direct economic loss reached ¥290 million (US$45 million).

=== Vietnam ===
From night of October 7 to October 8, coastal provinces from Quảng Trị to Quảng Nam received enduring heavy rainfall, with Thượng Lộ on Thừa Thiên Huế recording 247.0 millimetres (9.72 in), Thuy Yen reservoir at 216.0 millimetres (8.50 in) and Nam Dong at 205.0 millimetres (8.07 in). Floods swept away one person and seven cattles in Duy Xuyên District, Quảng Nam Province On Saturday, the victim was confirmed dead. On the same day, the storm killed one sailor in Thái Bình province. As Lionrock made its landfall over the country on October 10, torrential downpours also affected several provinces in the country. Nam Xay Luong 3 in Lao Cai reported 195.0 millimetres (7.68 in) of rainfall and Ta Si Lang in Yen Bai at 189.0 millimetres (7.44 in). Total damage was amounted to ₫32 billion (US$1.4 million).

=== Thailand ===
The remnants of Lionrock caused flooding in Isan. 6,251 households were affected by the flooding, but no casualties were reported.

== See also ==
- Weather of 2021
- Tropical cyclones in 2021
- Tropical Storm Kujira (2015) – Made landfall in a similar area in June 2015 and took a similar path
- Tropical Storm Sinlaku (2020) – Made landfall in a similar area in August 2020
- Tropical Storm Prapiroon (2024) – Made landfall in a similar area in July 2024, also the first tropical cyclone to hit Vietnam in 640 days.
