= 2022 Bohol local elections =

General election in the Philippines

2022 Bohol gubernatorial election
- May 9, 2022
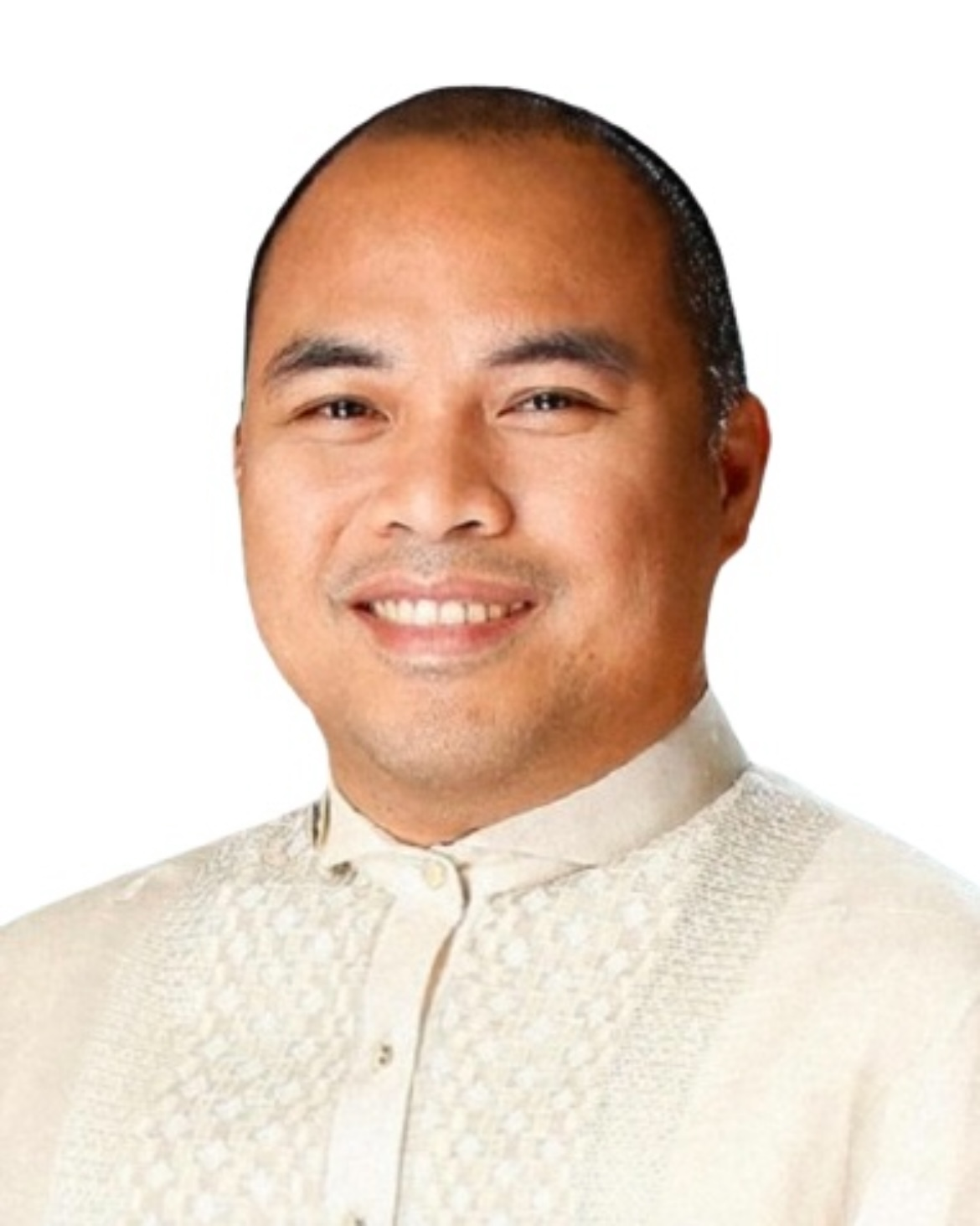

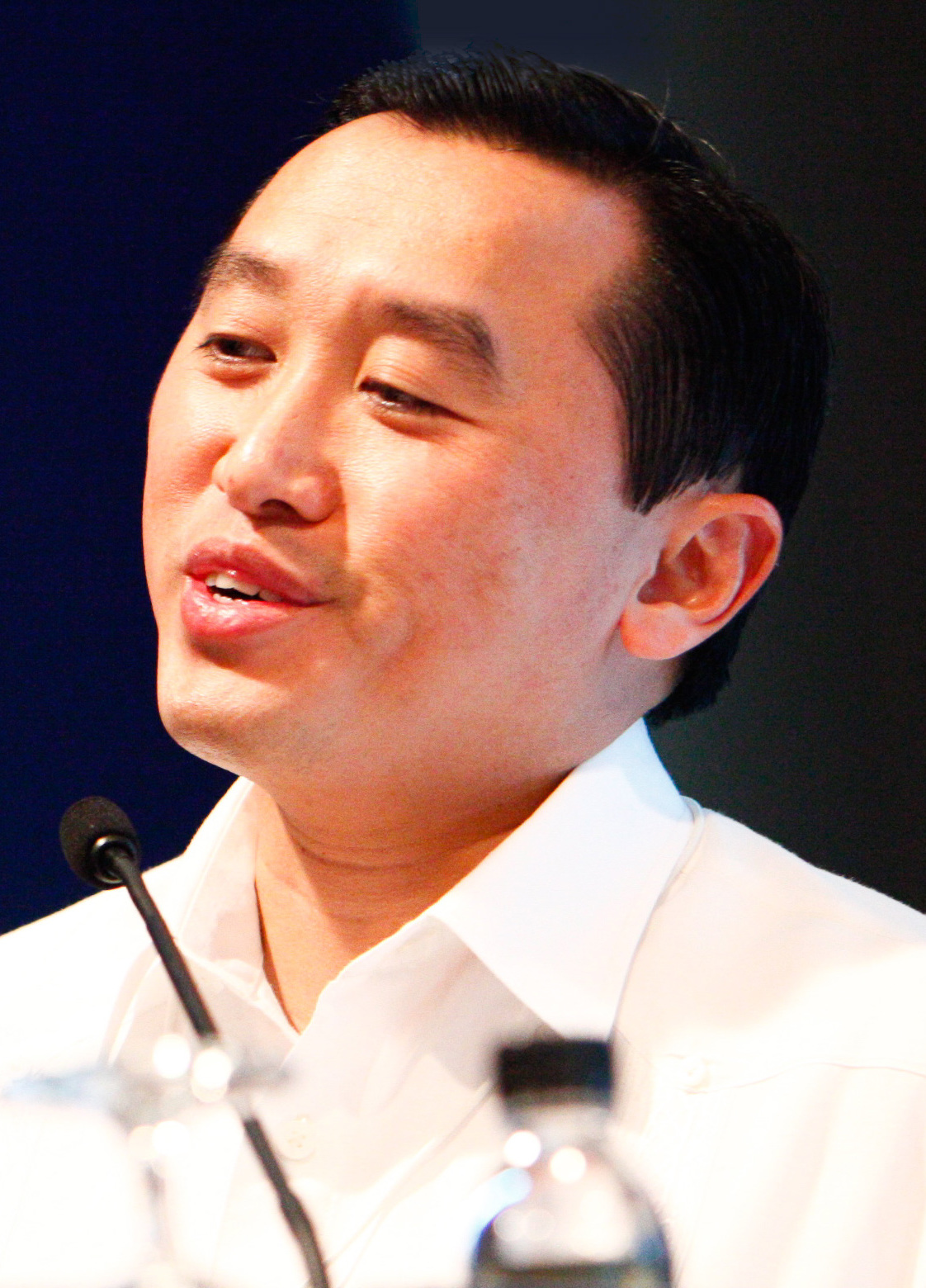

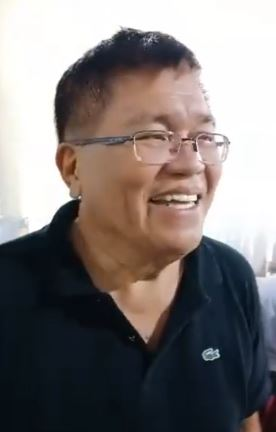

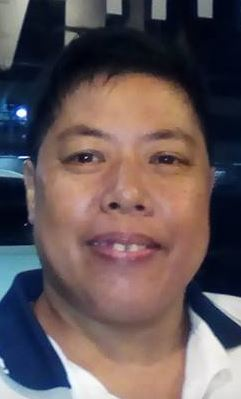
Nominee	Erico Aristotle Aumentado	Arthur C. Yap
Party	NPC	PDP–Laban
Running mate	Dionisio Victor Balite	Rene Relampagos
Popular vote	469,736	283,903
Percentage	56.09%	33.90%
Nominee	Hercules Castillo	Concepcion Flores (Note: Flores died by cardiac arrest, due to acute respiratory failure.)
Party	Independent	Independent
Popular vote	4,220	2,693
Percentage	0.50%	0.32%
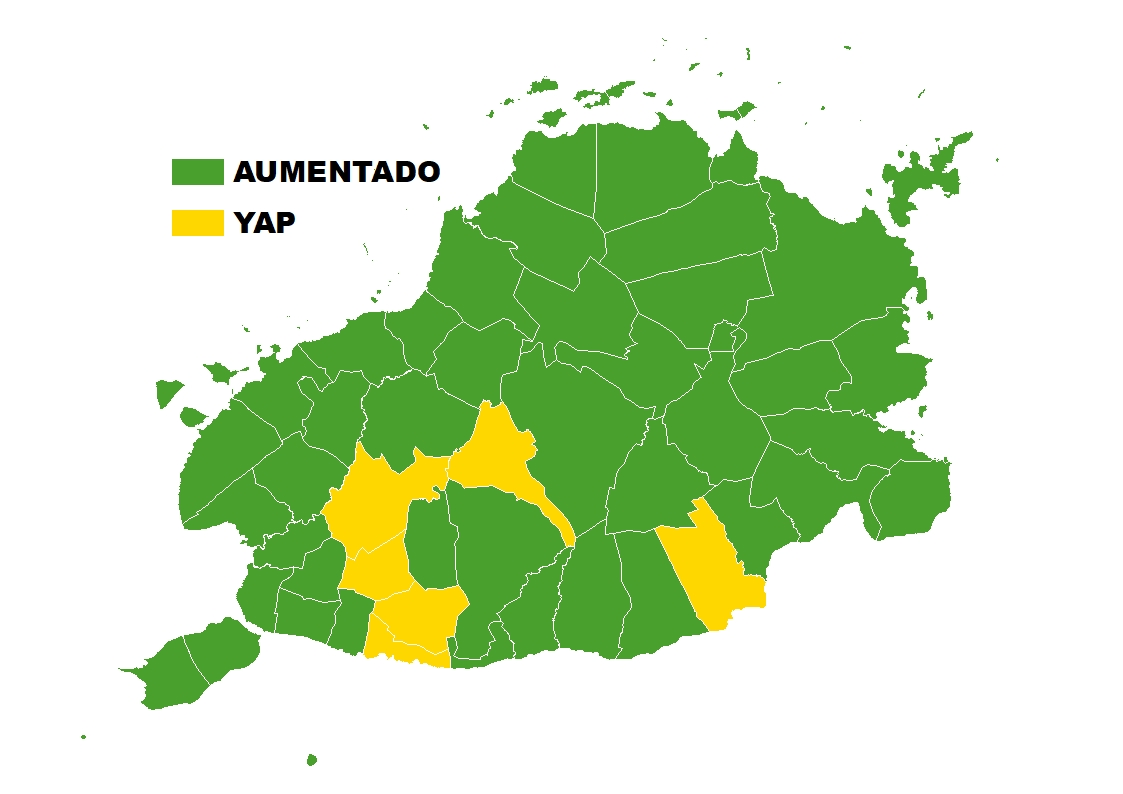
- Bohol 2022 Election Results for Governor. Map showing the official results taken from city and municipal certificates of canvass.
Governor before election
Arthur Yap
PDP–Laban
Elected Governor
Erico Aristotle Aumentado
NPC

Bohol local elections were held on May 9, 2022, as part of the 2022 Philippine general election. Registered voters elected leaders for local positions: the governor, vice-governor, as well as three to four members of the Sangguniang Panlalawigan, and three representatives for the three districts of Bohol, city or town mayor, vice mayor and councilors.

Based on the COMELEC's data, the province 2022 voting population is 949,791; increased by 5.69%, equivalent to 51,109 additional electorate from the 2019 elections voter count of 898,682, making Bohol the 20th vote-rich province in the country.

42 candidates submitted certificates of candidacy (COC) between October 1 and 8, 2021, for a total of 15 provincial and congressional seats.

On May 10, 2022, the Provincial Board of Canvassers proclaimed Abante Bohol tandem Erico Aristotle Aumentado and Dionisio Victor Balite as the newly elected governor and vice-governor of Bohol respectively.

== Provincial elections ==
=== Governor ===
- Electorate (2022): 949,791 (1,723 election returns)
- Turnout (2022): 837,470 (88.17%)

Last termer congressman Aris Aumentado won via landslide against the incumbent governor Arthur C. Yap.

Bohol gubernatorial election
Party	Candidate	Votes	%
NPC	Erico Aristotle Aumentado	469,736	56.09%
PDP–Laban	Arthur Yap	283,903	33.90%
Independent	Hercules Castillo	4,220	0.50%
Independent	Concepcion Flores^{f}	2,693	0.32%
Valid ballots		760,552	90.82%
Invalid or blank votes		76,918	9.18%
Total votes		837,470	100%

^f Died on March 12, 2022 and cannot be substituted since she ran as Independent.

=== Vice-Governor ===
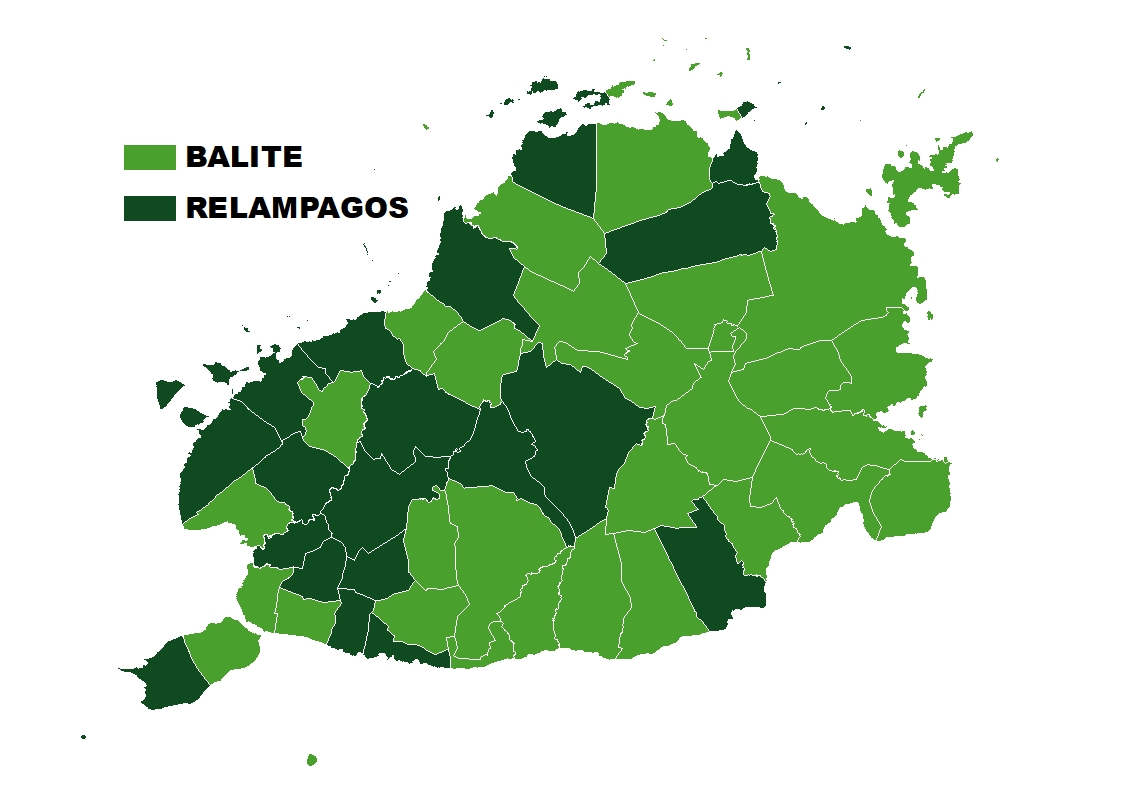
Bohol 2022 Election Results for Vice-Governor

- Electorate (2022): 949,791 (1,723 election returns)
- Turnout (2022): 837,470 (88.17%)

Senior board member Dionisio Victor Balite won against the incumbent Rene Relampagos.

Bohol vice-gubernatorial election
Party	Candidate	Votes	%
NPC	Dionisio Victor Balite	361,722	43.19%
NUP	Rene Relampagos	323,998	38.69%
Valid ballots		685,720	81.88%
Invalid or blank votes		151,750	18.12%
Total votes		837,470	100.00%

=== Sangguniang Panlalawigan ===
Party	Votes	%	Seats
Partido Demokratiko Pilipino-Lakas ng Bayan	455,666	24.51	3
National Unity Party	437,328	23.52	2
Nationalist People's Coalition	425,534	22.88	2
Nacionalista Party	310,406	16.69	2
Aksyon Demokratiko	83,074	4.47	1
People's Reform Party	79,036	4.25	–
Partido para sa Demokratikong Reporma	30,114	1.62	–
Labor Party Philippines	26,398	1.42	–
Independent	11,919	0.64	–
Ex officio seats			3
Total	1,859,475	100.00	13

Parties are as stated in their certificates of candidacy.

==== 1st District ====
- Electorate (2022): 316,471 (560 election returns)
- Turnout (2022): 280,232 (88.51%)

Bohol 1st District Sangguniang Panlalawigan election
Party	Candidate	Votes	%
NUP	Venzencio Arcamo	108,652	38.77%
NPC	Lucille Lagunay	102,545	36.59%
NUP	Aldner Damalerio	98,667	35.21%
NUP	Ricky Masamayor	85,768	30.61%
PRP	Margaux Goldie Herrera-Caya	79,036	28.20%
NPC	Dominic Butalid^{1}	65,078	23.22%
Reporma	Joseph Sevilla	30,114	10.75%
Independent	Francisco Sordilla Jr.	5,014	1.79%
Valid ballots		191,625	68.38%
Invalid or blank votes		88,607	31.62%
Total votes		280,232	100.00%

^1 Substituted Dalia Melda Tirol-Magno (NPC), who withdrew her candidacy on November 9, 2021.

.

==== 2nd District ====
- Electorate (2022): 312,434 (553 election returns)
- Turnout (2022): 275,219 (88.06%)

Bohol 2nd District Sangguniang Panlalawigan election
Party	Candidate	Votes	%
NPC	Tomas Abapo, Jr.	92,173	33.49%
Aksyon	Jiselle Rae Aumentado Villamor	83,074	29.85%
PDP–Laban	Vierna Mae Boniel-Maglasang	82,144	29.61%
NPC	Vincent Maximilian Entero	81,494	29.61%
NUP	Frans Gelaine Garcia Devenosa	75,156	27.31%
NUP	Agapito Avenido	69,085	25.10%
PDP–Laban	Galicano Atup^{2}	60,909	22.13%
Independent	Santos Abella	6,905	2.51%
Valid ballots		183,647	66.73%
Invalid or blank votes		91,572	33.27%
Total votes		275,219	100.00%

^2 Substituted Jesseril Intina (PDP-Laban).

.

==== 3rd District ====
- Electorate (2022): 320,786 (610 election returns)
- Turnout (2022): 282,019 (87.91%)

Bohol 3rd District Sangguniang Panlalawigan election
Party	Candidate	Votes	%
Nacionalista	Tita Baja	128,029	45.40%
Nacionalista	Greg Crispinito Jala	103,607	36.74%
PDP–Laban	Nathaniel Binlod	86,314	30.61%
PDP–Laban	Elpidio Bonita	85,515	30.32%
NPC	Arnold Dasio Cagulada^{3}	84,244	29.87%
Nacionalista	Pablio Sumampong	78,770	27.93%
PDP–Laban	Eliezer Baguio	74,967	26.58%
PDP–Laban	Emmanuel Jude Bernido	65,817	23.34%
WPP	Abdon dela Peña	26,398	9.36%
Valid ballots		183,415	65.04%
Invalid or blank votes		98,604	34.96%
Total votes		282,019	100.00%

^3 Substituted Stefan Lee Cagulada (NPC)

== Congressional elections ==
Parties are as stated in their certificates of candidacy.

=== 1st District ===
- City: Tagbilaran City
- Municipality: Alburquerque, Antequera, Baclayon, Balilihan, Calape, Catigbian, Corella, Cortes, Dauis, Loon, Maribojoc, Panglao, Sikatuna, Tubigon
- Population (2020): 470,599
- Electorate (2022): 316,471 (560 election returns)
- Turnout (2022): 280,232 (88.55%)

Incumbent Edgar Chatto was reelected.

Philippine House of Representatives election at Bohol's 1st district
Party	Candidate	Votes	%
NUP	Edgar Chatto	160,647	57.33%
NPC	Fabio Ontong Jr.	36,638	13.07%
Independent	Marybelle dela Serna	29,153	10.40%
Valid ballots		226,438	80.80%
Invalid or blank votes		53,794	19.20%
Total votes		280,232	88.55%

=== 2nd District ===
- City: none
- Municipality: Bien Unido, Buenavista, Clarin, Dagohoy, Danao, Getafe, Inabanga, Pres. Carlos P. Garcia, Sagbayan, San Isidro, San Miguel, Talibon, Trinidad, Ubay
- Population (2020): 471,025
- Electorate (2022): 312,534 (553 election returns)
- Turnout (2022): 275,219 (88.06%)

Erico Aristotle Aumentado was term limited. He ran for governor and won. His wife, Maria Vanessa Cadorna-Aumentado, became the first congresswoman ever elected in the Bohol's 2nd District, and third congresswoman elected in the province after Venice Borja-Agana in 1987 and Kristine Alexie Besas-Tutor in 2019.

Philippine House of Representatives election at Bohol's 2nd district
Party	Candidate	Votes	%
PRP	Ma. Vanessa C. Aumentado	138,266	50.24%
NUP	Jovanna Jumamoy	92,728	33.69%
PMP	Gerardo Garcia	10,642	3.87%
Lakas	Ramil Melencion	828	0.30%
Independent	Marcos Auza	558	0.20%
Valid ballots		243,022	88.30%
Invalid or blank votes		32,197	11.70%
Total votes		275,219	100.00%

=== 3rd District ===
- City: none
- Municipality: Alicia, Anda, Batuan, Bilar, Candijay, Carmen, Dimiao, Duero, Garcia Hernandez, Guindulman, Jagna, Lila, Loay, Loboc, Mabini, Pilar, Sevilla, Sierra Bullones, Valencia
- Population (2020): 452,705
- Electorate (2022): 320,786 (610 election returns)
- Turnout (2022): 282,019 (87.91%)

Incumbent Kristine Alexie Besas-Tutor was reelected.

Philippine House of Representatives election at Bohol's 3rd district
Party	Candidate	Votes	%
Nacionalista	Kristine Alexie Besas-Tutor	167,359	59.34%
PDP–Laban	Maria Katrina Lim	88,686	31.45%
WPP	Roger Cadorniga	1,326	0.47%
Valid ballots		257,371	91.26%
Invalid or blank votes		24,648	8.74%
Total votes		282,019	100.00%

== City and municipal elections ==
All municipalities of Bohol and Tagbilaran City elected mayors, vice-mayors and councilors this election. The mayor and vice mayor with the highest number of votes win the seat; they are voted separately, therefore, they may be of different parties when elected.

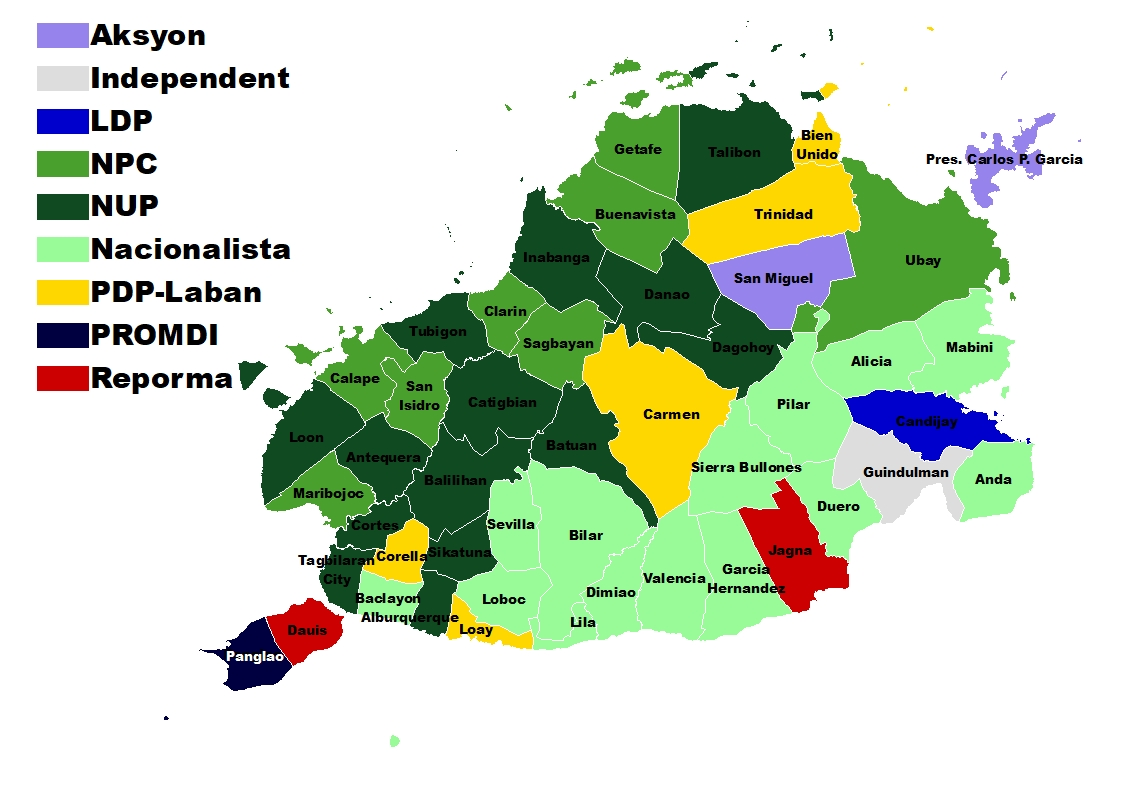
Bohol 2022 City and Municipality Elections Results in Bohol

=== First District ===
==== Alburquerque ====
- Electorate (2022): 7,775 (13 election returns)
- Turnout (2022): 6,997 (89.99%)

Incumbent mayor Don Ritchie Buates was reelected, while incumbent vice-mayor Jet Jose Ugduracion Jr. failed on his reelection bid.

Alburquerque Mayoral Election
Party	Candidate	Votes	%
NUP	Don Ritchie Buates	4,256	60.83%
NPC	Ritchel Lim	2,500	35.73%
Valid ballots		6,756	96.56%
Invalid or blank votes		241	3.44%
Total votes		6,997	100.00%

Alburquerque Vice Mayoral Election
Party	Candidate	Votes	%
NPC	Dagohoy Samar	3,447	49.26%
NUP	Jet Jose Ugdoracion	2,831	40.46%
Aksyon	Amon Rey Loquere	144	2.06%
Valid ballots		6,422	91.78%
Invalid or blank votes		575	8.22%
Total votes		6,997	100.00%

==== Antequera ====
- Electorate (2022): 10,139 (23 election returns)
- Turnout (2022): 9,273 (91.46%)

Incumbent vice-mayor Jose Mario Pahang won against incumbent mayor Lilioso Nunag.

Antequera Mayoral Election
Party	Candidate	Votes	%
NUP	Jose Mario Pahang	4,429	47.76%
PDP–Laban	Lilioso Nunag	4,317	46.55%
Valid ballots		8,746	94.32%
Invalid or blank votes		527	5.68%
Total votes		9,273	100.00%

Antequera Vice Mayoral Election
Party	Candidate	Votes	%
NUP	Cecelia Rebosura-Salomon	4,786	51.61%
PDP–Laban	Lanibel Labado	2,467	26.60%
NPC	Asterio Coquilla	1,306	14.08%
Valid ballots		8,559	92.03%
Invalid or blank votes		714	7.70%
Total votes		9,273	100.00%

==== Baclayon ====
- Electorate (2022): 14,180 (26 election returns)
- Turnout (2022): 12,532 (88.38%)

Incumbents Benecio Uy and Romulo Balangkig were reelected.

Baclayon Mayoral Election
Party	Candidate	Votes	%
Nacionalista	Alvin Uy	6,434	51.34%
NUP	Benecio Uy	5,762	45.98%
Valid ballots		12,196	97.32
Invalid or blank votes		336	2.68%
Total votes		12,532	100.00%

Baclayon Vice Mayoral Election
Party	Candidate	Votes	%
NPC	Romulo Balangkig	6,258	49.94%
NUP	Amon Uy^{m}	5,679	45.32%
Valid ballots		11,937	95.25%
Invalid or blank votes		595	4.75%
Total votes		12,532	100.00%

:^m Substituted Ma. Judith Israel

==== Balilihan ====
- Electorate (2022): 14,669 (32 election returns)
- Turnout (2022): 13,429 (91.55%)

Incumbent mayor Pureza Chatto was reelected against incumbent vice-mayor Adonis Roy Olalo.

Balilihan Mayoral Election
Party	Candidate	Votes	%
NUP	Maria Pureza Veloso-Chatto	7,753	57.73%
NPC	Adonis Roy Olalo	5,031	37.46%
Valid ballots		12,784	95.20%
Invalid or blank votes		645	4.80%
Total votes		13,429	100.00%

Balilihan Vice Mayoral Election
Party	Candidate	Votes	%
NUP	Esther Patricia Chatto	7,684	57.22%
NPC	Joemar Unabia	5,083	37.85%
Valid ballots		12,767	95.07%
Invalid or blank votes		662	4.93%
Total votes		13,429	100.00%

==== Calape ====
- Electorate (2022): 22,819 (45 election returns)
- Turnout (2022): 20,150 (88.30%)

Former vice-governor Julius Caesar Herrera won against incumbent mayor Nelson Yu. Yu's brother incumbent vice-mayor Sulpicio Yu Jr. was reelected.

Calape Mayoral Election
Party	Candidate	Votes	%
NPC	Julius Caesar Herrera^{d}	10,150	50.37%
NUP	Nelson Yu	9,138	45.35%
Valid ballots		19,288	95.72%
Invalid or blank votes		862	4.28%
Total votes		20,150	100.00%

Calape Vice Mayoral Election
Party	Candidate	Votes	%
NUP	Sulpicio Yu Jr.	11,960	59.35%
NPC	Manol Sia^{h}	6,890	34.19%
Valid ballots		18,850	93.55%
Invalid or blank votes		1,300	6.45%
Total votes		20,150	100.00%

:^dSubstituted Joseph Allan Dumalag
:^hSubstituted Hananera Rasonabe Bonggot

==== Catigbian ====
- Electorate (2022): 16,269 (30 election returns)
- Turnout (2022): 14,558 (89.48%)

Incumbents Elizabeth Mandin-Pace and Esteban Angilan Jr. were reelected.

Catigbian Mayoral Election
Party	Candidate	Votes	%
NUP	Elizabeth Mandin-Pace	9,643	66.24%
NPC	Themistocles Digaum	3,975	27.30%
Valid ballots		13,618	93.54%
Invalid or blank votes		940	6.46%
Total votes		14,558	100.00%

Catigbian Vice Mayoral Election
Party	Candidate	Votes	%
NUP	Esteban Angilan Jr.	7,966	54.72%
NPC	Joseph Digaum	5,250	36.06%
Valid ballots		13,216	90.78%
Invalid or blank votes		1,342	9.22%
Total votes		14,558	100.00%

==== Corella ====
- Electorate (2022): 6,084 (11 election returns)
- Turnout (2022): 5,562 (91.42%)

Juan Manuel Lim defeated incumbent mayor Hilario Tocmo. Meanwhile, incumbent vice-mayor Ma. Asuncion Banal-Daquio was term-limited.

Corella Mayoral Election
Party	Candidate	Votes	%
PDP–Laban	Juan Manuel Lim	3,182	57.21%
Lakas	Hilario Tocmo	2,138	38.44%
Independent	Epifanio Bolando	50	0.90%
Valid ballots		5,370	96.55%
Invalid or blank votes		192	3.45%
Total votes		5,562	100.00%

Corella Vice Mayoral Election
Party	Candidate	Votes	%
NUP	Danilo Bandala	2,780	49.98%
Lakas	Niel Eric Ochoco	2,456	44.16%
Valid ballots		5,236	94.14%
Invalid or blank votes		326	5.86%
Total votes		5,562	100.00%

==== Cortes ====
- Electorate (2022): 11,748 (22 election returns)
- Turnout (2022): 10,595 (90.19%)

Incumbent mayor Lynn Iven Lim was reelected while incumbent vice-mayor Leo Pabutoy failed on his reelection bid.

Cortes Mayoral Election
Party	Candidate	Votes	%
NUP	Lynn Iven Lim	6,126	57.62%
PROMDI	Alexander Initay	3,699	34.91%
Valid ballots		9,825	92.73%
Invalid or blank votes		770	7.27%
Total votes		10,595	100.00%

Cortes Vice Mayoral Election
Party	Candidate	Votes	%
PROMDI	Rodrigo Uy	4,307	40.65%
NUP	Leo Pabutoy	4,247	40.08%
Independent	Glendell Pondoc	1,248	11.78%
Valid ballots		9,802	92.52%
Invalid or blank votes		793	7.48%
Total votes		10,595	100.00%

==== Dauis ====
- Electorate (2022): 31,781 (47 election returns)
- Turnout (2022): 27,908 (87.81%)

Incumbents Marietta Tocmo-Sumaylo and Luciano Bongalos were term limited. Sumaylo ran for vice-mayor and won.

Dauis Mayoral Election
Party	Candidate	Votes	%
Reporma	Roman Bullen	14,380	51.53%
NUP	Josever Sumaylo	11,701	41.93%
Valid ballots		26,081	93.45%
Invalid or blank votes		1,827	6.55%
Total votes		27,908	100.00%

Dauis Vice Mayoral Election
Party	Candidate	Votes	%
NUP	Marietta Tocmo Sumaylo	18,201	65.22%
Independent	Marcelo Pintac	7,630	27.34%
Valid ballots		25,831	92.56%
Invalid or blank votes		2,077	7.44%
Total votes		27,908	100.00%

==== Loon ====
- Electorate (2022): 30,156 (75 election returns)
- Turnout (2022): 26,563 (88.09%)

Incumbents Elvi Peter Relampagos and Lloyd Peter Lopez were reelected.

Loon Mayoral Election
Party	Candidate	Votes	%
NUP	Elvi Peter Relampagos	14,084	53.02%
NPC	Mary Jocelyn Nazareno	6,703	25.23%
Reporma	Rolando Paloso	2,827	10.64%
Independent	Fortunato Garay	387	1.46%
Independent	Eutiquio Guantero	143	0.54%
Valid ballots		24,144	90.89%
Invalid or blank votes		2,419	9.11%
Total votes		26,563	100.00%

Loon Vice Mayoral Election
Party	Candidate	Votes	%
NUP	Lloyd Peter Lopez	17,670	66.52%
Reporma	Neron Camilotes	4,582	17.25%
Valid ballots		22,252	83.77%
Invalid or blank votes		4,311	16.23%
Total votes		26,563	100.00%

==== Maribojoc ====
- Electorate (2022): 14,759 (29 election returns)
- Turnout (2022): 13,303 (90.13%)

Incumbents Romulo Manuta and Emilio Castilla were reelected.

Maribojoc Mayoral Election
Party	Candidate	Votes	%
NPC	Romulo Manuta	4,329	32.54%
NUP	Wendeline Rojas	4,225	31.76%
Independent	Gumersindo Arocha	3,655	27.48%
Independent	Barnido Magdaleno Jr.	379	2.85%
Valid ballots		12,588	94.63%
Invalid or blank votes		715	5.37%
Total votes		13,303	100.00%

Maribojoc Vice Mayoral Election
Party	Candidate	Votes	%
NPC	Emilio Castilla	7,085	53.26%
NUP	Jereniel Veloso	4,890	36.76%
Valid ballots		11,975	90.02%
Invalid or blank votes		1,328	9.98%
Total votes		13,303	100.00%

==== Panglao ====
- Electorate (2022): 28,052 (41 election returns)
- Turnout (2022): 24,113 (85.96%)

Incumbents mayor Leonila Paredes-Montero was term limited while incumbent vice mayor Briccio Velasco failed on his reelection.

Panglao Mayoral Election
Party	Candidate	Votes	%
PROMDI	Edgardo Arcay	13,650	56.61%
Nacionalista	Amira Alia Montero-Caindec	9,591	39.78%
Valid ballots		23,241	96.38%
Invalid or blank votes		872	3.62%
Total votes		24,113	100.00%

Panglao Vice Mayoral Election
Party	Candidate	Votes	%
PROMDI	Noel Hormachuelos	14,289	59.26%
Nacionalista	Briccio Velasco	8,023	33.27%
Valid ballots		22,312	92.53%
Invalid or blank votes		1,801	7.47%
Total votes		24,113	100.00%

==== Sikatuna ====
- Electorate (2022): 5,141 (12 election returns)
- Turnout (2022): 4,600 (89.48%)

Incumbents Justiniana Ellorimo and Olimpio Calimpusan were unopposed.

Sikatuna Mayoral Election
Party	Candidate	Votes	%
NUP	Justiniana Ellorimo	3,690	80.22%
Valid ballots		3,690	80.22%
Invalid or blank votes		910	19.78%
Total votes		4,600	100.00%

Sikatuna Vice Mayoral Election
Party	Candidate	Votes	%
NUP	Olimpio Calimpusan	3,799	82.59%
Valid ballots		3,799	82.59%
Invalid or blank votes		801	17.41%
Total votes		4,600	100.00%

==== Tagbilaran City ====
- Electorate (2022): 70,254 (97 election returns)
- Turnout (2022): 61,821 (88.00%)

Both incumbents mayor John Geesnell Yap and vice-mayor Jose Antonio Veloso, were term limited. Yap chose not to run while Veloso ran for mayor against Yap's wife Jane. Jane Censoria Cajes–Yap and Adam Relson Jala became the newly elected mayor and vice-mayor of city, and winning it by landslide. Jane Yap also became the youngest (at age 32), the first city lady mayor to be elected and the 2nd city lady mayor after Carmen Gatal, who was then an appointed OIC city mayor from December 2–6, 1987.

Tagbilaran City Mayoral Election
Party	Candidate	Votes	%
NUP	Jane Censoria Cajes–Yap	38,584	62.41%
PMP	Dan Neri Lim^{4}	10,458	16.92%
Aksyon	Jose Antonio Veloso	8,948	14.47%
PROMDI	Vicente Polinar	1,511	2.44%
Independent	Salvio Makinano	152	0.25%
Valid ballots		59,063	96.49%
Invalid or blank votes		2,168	3.51%
Total votes		61,821	100.00%

Tagbilaran City Vice Mayoral Election
Party	Candidate	Votes	%
NUP	Adam Relson Jala	38,733	62.65%
Aksyon	Agustinus Gonzaga	17,817	28.82%
PMP	Donald Marcellana	730	1.18%
Independent	Manuel del Mundo	261	0.42%
Valid ballots		57,541	93.08%
Invalid or blank votes		4,280	6.92%
Total votes		61,821	100.00%

^4 Substituted his son Dan Ismael Lim (PMP), who withdrew his candidacy on November 15, 2021.

==== Tubigon ====
- Electorate (2022): 32,645 (57 election returns)
- Turnout (2022): 28,828 (88.31%)

Incumbents William Richard Jao and Renato Villaber were reelected.

Tubigon Mayoral Election
Party	Candidate	Votes	%
NUP	William Richard Jao	13,882	48.15%
NPC	Marlon R. Amila	13,780	47.80%
Valid ballots		27,662	95.96%
Invalid or blank votes		1,166	4.04%
Total votes		28,828	100.00%

Tubigon Vice Mayoral Election
Party	Candidate	Votes	%
NUP	Renato Villaber	14,283	49.55%
NPC	Bobby Lopez	12,095	41.96%
Valid ballots		26,378	91.50%
Invalid or blank votes		2,450	8.50%
Total votes		28,828	100.00%

=== Second District ===
==== Bien Unido ====
- Electorate (2022): 18,684 (30 election returns)
- Turnout (2022): 16,241 (86.92%)

Incumbent mayor Rene Borenaga was reelected but incumbent vice-mayor Ramon Arcenal failed on his reelection bid.

Bien Unido Mayoral Election
Party	Candidate	Votes	%
PDP–Laban	Rene Borenaga	9,557	58.84%
Independent	Bernardino Garcia	2,392	14.73%
PROMDI	Rolando Avenido	1,392	8.57%
Valid ballots		13,341	82.14%
Invalid or blank votes		2,900	17.86%
Total votes		16,241	100.00%

Bien Unido Vice Mayoral Election
Party	Candidate	Votes	%
PFP	Renato Hoylar	7,818	48.14%
PDP–Laban	Ramon Arcenal	5,689	35.03%
Valid ballots		13,507	83.17%
Invalid or blank votes		2,734	16.83%
Total votes		16,241	100.00%

==== Buenavista ====
- Electorate (2022): 22,032 (40 election returns)
- Turnout (2022): 19,479 (88.41%)

Incumbent mayor Dave Duallo was reelected against incumbent vice-mayor Ma. Christine Cabarrubias Torregosa.

Buenavista Mayoral Election
Party	Candidate	Votes	%
NPC	Dave Duallo	7,787	39.98%
PDP–Laban	Ma. Christine Cabarrubias Torregosa	6,609	33.93%
PMP	Modesto Membreve	3,788	19.45%
Valid ballots		18,184	93.35%
Invalid or blank votes		1,295	6.65%
Total votes		19,479	100.00%

Buenavista Vice Mayoral Election
Party	Candidate	Votes	%
NPC	Elsa Tirol	10,254	52.69%
NUP	Jesus Jumao-as	5,307	27.24%
Valid ballots		15,571	79.94%
Invalid or blank votes		3,908	20.06%
Total votes		19,479	100.00%

==== Clarin ====
- Electorate (2022): 16,375 (32 election returns)
- Turnout (2022): 14,706 (89.81%)

Incumbent mayor Eugeniano Ibarra won against incumbent vice mayor Allen Ray Piezas.

Clarin Mayoral Election
Party	Candidate	Votes	%
NPC	Eugeniano Ibarra	7,462	50.74%
NUP	Allen Ray Piezas	6,638	45.14%
Valid ballots		14,100	95.88%
Invalid or blank votes		606	4.12%
Total votes		14,706	100.00%

Clarin Vice Mayoral Election
Party	Candidate	Votes	%
NPC	Fernando Camacho Jr.	7,617	51.80%
PDP–Laban	Carlo Ombajin	5,928	40.31%
Valid ballots		13,545	92.11%
Invalid or blank votes		1,161	7.89%
Total votes		14,706	100.00%

==== Dagohoy ====
- Electorate (2022): 13,425 (23 election returns)
- Turnout (2022): 11,999 (89.38%)

Incumbent mayor Sofronio Apat was term-limited while incumbent vice-mayor Ma. Shirley Abulag-Amodia failed on her reelection bid.

Dagohoy Mayoral Election
Party	Candidate	Votes	%
NUP	Germinio Relampagos	5,813	48.45%
NPC	Reno Apat	5,623	46.86%
Valid ballots		11,436	%
Invalid or blank votes			%
Total votes			100.00%

Dagohoy Vice Mayoral Election
Party	Candidate	Votes	%
PDP–Laban	Roel Lagroma	6,594	54.95%
NPC	Ma. Shirley Amodia	4,531	37.76%
Valid ballots		11,125	92.72%
Invalid or blank votes		874	7.28%
Total votes		11,999	100.00%

==== Danao ====
- Electorate (2022): 13,834 (25 election returns)
- Turnout (2022): 12,019 (86.88%)

Incumbents Jose Cepedoza and Albert Vitor were reelected. Cepedoza was unopposed.

Danao Mayoral Election
Party	Candidate	Votes	%
NUP	Jose Cepedoza	8,121	
Valid ballots		8,121	67.57%
Invalid or blank votes		3,898	32.43%
Total votes		12,019	100.00%

Danao Vice Mayoral Election
Party	Candidate	Votes	%
NUP	Albert Vitor	6,019	50.08%
NPC	Benjamin Bonio	4,911	40.86%
Valid ballots		10,930	90.94%
Invalid or blank votes		1,089	9.06%
Total votes		12,019	100.00%

==== Getafe ====
- Electorate (2022): 21,499 (38 election returns)
- Turnout (2022): 19,265 (89.61%)

Incumbent mayor Casey Shaun Camacho run for vice-mayor and won while his brother, former mayor Cary Camacho regained his former position as mayor. Vice-mayor Eduardo Torremocha chose not to run.

Getafe Mayoral Election
Party	Candidate	Votes	%
NPC	Cary Camacho	9,870	51.23%
NUP	Rodolfo dela Torre	7,921	41.12%
Valid ballots		17,791	92.35%
Invalid or blank votes		1,474	7.65%
Total votes		19,265	100.00%

Getafe Vice Mayoral Election
Party	Candidate	Votes	%
NPC	Casey Shaun Camacho	10,323	53.58%
NUP	Romeo Cabading	6,908	35.86%
Valid ballots		17,231	89.44%
Invalid or blank votes		2,034	10.56%
Total votes		19,265	100.00%

==== Inabanga ====
- Electorate (2022): 31,877 (62 election returns)
- Turnout (2022): 27,591 (86.55%)

Incumbent mayor Josephine Socorro Jumamoy was term-limited. She ran for vice-mayor and won.

Inabanga Mayoral Election
Party	Candidate	Votes	%
NUP	Jose Jono Jumamoy	21,293	77.17%
NPC	Edgar Allan Fortich	3,344	12.21%
Independent	Florencio Vitor	339	1.23%
Valid ballots		24,976	90.52%
Invalid or blank votes		2,615	9.48%
Total votes		27,591	100.00%

Inabanga Vice Mayoral Election
Party	Candidate	Votes	%
NUP	Josephine Socorro Jumamoy	19,324	70.04%
NPC	Geronimo Mejias	3,153	11.43%
Independent	Fernando Lovely Anzano	815	2.95%
Valid ballots		23,292	84.42%
Invalid or blank votes		4,299	15.58%
Total votes		27,591	100.00%

==== Pres. Carlos P. Garcia ====
- Electorate (2022): 16,793 (33 election returns)
- Turnout (2022): 14,556 (86.68%)

Incumbent mayor Fernando Estavilla was reelected but incumbent vice mayor Nestor Abad failed on his reelection bid.

Pres. Carlos P. Garcia Mayoral Election
Party	Candidate	Votes	%
Aksyon	Fernando Estavilla	7,674	57.2%
NPC	Vicente Cutamora	5,631	38.69%
Reporma	Medardo Palapo	112	0.77%
Valid ballots		13,417	92.18%
Invalid or blank votes		1,139	7.82%
Total votes		14,556	100.00%

Pres. Carlos P. Garcia Vice Mayoral Election
Party	Candidate	Votes	%
NPC	Wilma Cruz Dusal	7,169	49.28%
NUP	Nestor Abad	5,073	34.85%
Reporma	Edilberto Escaño	354	2.43%
Valid ballots		12,596	86.53%
Invalid or blank votes		1,960	13.47%
Total votes		14,556	100.00%

==== Sagbayan ====
- Electorate (2022): 16,758 (32 election returns)
- Turnout (2022): 14,890 (88.85%)

Incumbents Restituto Suarez III and Asuncion Bautista-Ybañez were reelected.

Sagbayan Mayoral Election
Party	Candidate	Votes	%
NPC	Restituto Suarez III	9,278	62.31%
NUP	Jimmy Torrefranca	4,802	32.25%
Valid ballots		14,080	94.56%
Invalid or blank votes		810	5.44%
Total votes		14,890	100.00%

Sagbayan Vice Mayoral Election
Party	Candidate	Votes	%
NPC	Asuncion Bautista Ybañez	8,805	59.13%
NUP	Roque Amores	4,717	31.68%
Valid ballots		13,522	90.81%
Invalid or blank votes		1,368	9.19%
Total votes		14,890	100.00%

==== San Isidro ====
- Electorate (2022): 7,246 (15 election returns)
- Turnout (2022): 6,478 (89.40%)

Incumbents mayor Diosdado Gementiza Jr. and Filemon Mantabute were reelected.

San Isidro Mayoral Election
Party	Candidate	Votes	%
NPC	Diosdado Gementiza Jr.	3,978	61.41%
PDP–Laban	Teodora Sandigan	2,045	31.57%
Independent	Rolando Talaboc	4	0.06%
Valid ballots		6,027	93.04%
Invalid or blank votes		41	6.96%
Total votes		6,478	100.00%

San Isidro Vice Mayoral Election
Party	Candidate	Votes	%
NPC	Filemon Mantabote	3,535	54.57%
PDP–Laban	Joseph Libaton	2,291	35.37%
Valid ballots		5,826	89.94%
Invalid or blank votes		652	10.06%
Total votes		6,478	100.00%

==== San Miguel ====
- Electorate (2022): 17,329 (31 election returns)
- Turnout (2022): 14,897 (85.97%)

Incumbent mayor Virgilio Mendez did not seek for reelection. On the other hand, incumbent vice-mayor Faustino Bulaga was unopposed.

San Miguel Mayoral Election
Party	Candidate	Votes	%
Aksyon	Ian Gil Mendez	8,882	59.62%
Independent	Bernardo Avenido Jr.	3,492	23.44%
Valid ballots		12,374	83.06%
Invalid or blank votes		2,523	16.94%
Total votes		14,897	100.00%

San Miguel Vice Mayoral Election
Party	Candidate	Votes	%
NPC	Faustino Bulaga	11,292	75.80%
Valid ballots		11,292	75.80%
Invalid or blank votes		3,605	24.20%
Total votes		14,897	100.00%

==== Talibon ====
- Electorate (2022): 42,762 (65 election returns)
- Turnout (2022): 37,737 (88.25%)

Incumbents Janette Garcia and Dave Evangelista were reelected.

Talibon Mayoral Election
Party	Candidate	Votes	%
NUP	Janette Aurestila-Garcia	16,663	44.16%
NPC	Jerald Taneo	13,386	35.47%
Independent	Epifanio Quimson	5,360	14.20%
Independent	Mario Cocoy Garcia Jr.	184	0.49%
Valid ballots		35,593	94.32%
Invalid or blank votes		2,144	5.68%
Total votes		37,737	100.00%

Talibon Vice Mayoral Election
Party	Candidate	Votes	%
NUP	Dave Evangelista	18,789	49.79%
NPC	Expedito Abuan	13,406	35.52%
Valid ballots		32,195	85.31%
Invalid or blank votes		5,542	14.69%
Total votes		37,737	100.00%

==== Trinidad ====
- Electorate (2022): 23,715 (41 election returns)
- Turnout (2022): 20,833 (87.85%)

Incumbents Judith del Rosario-Cajes and Manuel Garcia were term limited. Cajes was substituted by her husband, former congressman and mayor Roberto Cajes.

Trinidad Mayoral Election
Party	Candidate	Votes	%
PDP–Laban	Roberto Cajes	12,468	59.85%
NPC	Juanilo Orioque	7,359	35.32%
Valid ballots		19,827	95.17%
Invalid or blank votes		1,006	4.83%
Total votes		20,833	100.00%

Trinidad Vice Mayoral Election
Party	Candidate	Votes	%
NUP	Fernando Erio	11,888	57.06%
PFP	Elmer Nuez	6,725	32.28%
NPC	Felidelfo Garcia	700	3.36%
Valid ballots		19,313	92.70%
Invalid or blank votes		1,520	7.30%
Total votes		20,833	100.00%

==== Ubay ====
- Electorate (2022): 50,205 (86 election returns)
- Turnout (2022): 44,528 (88.69%)

Incumbents Constantino Reyes and Victor Bonghanoy were reelected.

Ubay Mayoral Election
Party	Candidate	Votes	%
NPC	Constantino Reyes	27,275	61.25%
PDP–Laban	Joan Abad Balduman	13,630	30.61%
Valid ballots		40,905	91.86%
Invalid or blank votes		3,623	8.14%
Total votes		44,528	100.00%

Ubay Vice Mayoral Election
Party	Candidate	Votes	%
NPC	Victor Bonghanoy	24,493	55.01%
PDP–Laban	Nelson Uy	14,668	32.94%
Valid ballots		39,161	87.95%
Invalid or blank votes		5,367	12.05%
Total votes		44,528	100.00%

=== Third District ===
==== Alicia ====
- Electorate (2022): 17,111 (28 election returns)
- Turnout (2022): 15,161 (88.60%)

On May 9, 2022, after the election, incumbent vice-mayor Marnilou Ayuban won against incumbent mayor Victoriano Torres III.

On June 16, 2022, prior to assumption of Ayuban in the office of the mayor, Judge Jorge Espinal of the 7th RTC Branch 51 in Carmen, Bohol, issued an arrest warrant for Ayuban, former councilors, and a budget officer for their conviction of the charges for violation of Anti-Graft and Corrupt Practices Act. This prompt Ayuban to issue Office Memorandum Order No. 1, series of 2022 dated June 30, 2022, designating municipal administrator Junavie Piquero as officer-in-charge of the Mayor’s Office from June 30, 2022, to July 15, 2022, while the former was still at-large.

On August 3, 2022, incumbent vice-mayor Cesyl Balahay assumed the office of the mayor as certified by the DILG provincial director Jerome Gonzales.

On May 19, 2023, 7th RTC Branch 51 Judge Jorge Espinal proclaimed former mayor Victoriano Torres III as the winner without contest, after the conclusion of the protest he filed against his opponent, mayor Ayuban for falsification of her certificate of candidacy, and later deemed disqualified in the last election.

Alicia Mayoral Election
Party	Candidate	Votes	%
Nacionalista	Marnilou Ayuban	8,763	57.80%
PDP–Laban	Victoriano Torres III	5,384	35.51%
Valid ballots		14,147	93.31%
Invalid or blank votes		1,014	6.69%
Total votes		15,161	100.00%

Alicia Vice Mayoral Election
Party	Candidate	Votes	%
PDP–Laban	Cesyl Balahay	7,034	46.40%
Nacionalista	Frasan Corre	5,912	38.99%
Independent	Anecito Miasco	827	5.45%
Valid ballots		13,773	90.84%
Invalid or blank votes		1,388	9.16%
Total votes		15,161	100.00%

==== Anda ====
- Electorate (2022): 13,817 (26 election returns)
- Turnout (2022): 12,092 (87.52%)

Former mayor Angelina Blanco Simacio won against incumbent mayor Metodio Amper. Meanwhile, incumbent vice mayor Nilo Bersabal was reelected.

Anda Mayoral Election
Party	Candidate	Votes	%
Nacionalista	Angelina Blanco Simacio	6,208	51.34%
PDP–Laban	Metodio Amper	5,485	45.36%
Independent	Esmeraldo Tiempo	19	0.16%
Independent	Aquilino Felicitas Jr.	7	0.06%
Valid ballots		11,719	96.92%
Invalid or blank votes		373	3.08%
Total votes		12,092	100.00%

Anda Vice Mayoral Election
Party	Candidate	Votes	%
NPC	Nilo Bersabal	6,160	50.94%
PDP–Laban	Ferdinand Visaya Berongoy	5,268	43.57%
Independent	Jorge Ampalayo	41	0.34%
Valid ballots		11,469	94.85%
Invalid or blank votes		623	5.15%
Total votes		12,092	100.00%

==== Batuan ====
- Electorate (2022): 9,920 (19 election returns)
- Turnout (2022): 8,914 (89.86%)

Incumbent mayor Antonino Jumawid was reelected while incumbent vice mayor Precious Joy Dumagan-Baguio failed.

Batuan Mayoral Election
Party	Candidate	Votes	%
NUP	Antonino Jumawid	5,119	57.43%
NPC	Joel Daquis	3,435	38.53%
Valid ballots		8,554	95.96%
Invalid or blank votes		360	4.04%
Total votes		8,914	100.00%

Batuan Vice Mayoral Election
Party	Candidate	Votes	%
NUP	Zeniza Bulalaque	4,646	52.12%
NPC	Precious Joy Tirol Dumagan-Baguio	3,835	43.02%
Valid ballots		8,481	95.14%
Invalid or blank votes		433	4.86%
Total votes		8,914	100.00%

==== Bilar ====
- Electorate (2022): 13,418 (27 election returns)
- Turnout (2022): 12,091 (90.11%)

Incumbent vice-mayor Norman Palacio won against incumbent mayor Manuel Jayectin.

Bilar Mayoral Election
Party	Candidate	Votes	%
Nacionalista	Norman Palacio	6,500	53.76%
PDP–Laban	Manuel Jayectin	5,093	42.12%
Valid ballots		11,593	95.88%
Invalid or blank votes		498	4.12%
Total votes		12,091	100.00%

Bilar Vice Mayoral Election
Party	Candidate	Votes	%
Nacionalista	Ranulfo Maligmat	6,616	54.72%
PDP–Laban	George Brillantes	4,611	38.14%
Valid ballots		11,227	92.85%
Invalid or blank votes		864	7.15%
Total votes		12,091	100.00%

==== Candijay ====
- Electorate (2022): 21,628 (38 election returns)
- Turnout (2022): 19,073 (88.19%)

Incumbent mayor Christopher Tutor was term limited. He ran for vice-mayor and won.

Candijay Mayoral Election
Party	Candidate	Votes	%
LDP	Thamar Olaivar	13,943	73.10%
PDP–Laban	Mc Aldous Castañares	3,288	17.24%
Independent	Hamilcar Fuentes	553	2.90%
Aksyon	Victor Bernados	91	0.48%
Valid ballots		17,875	93.72%
Invalid or blank votes		1,198	6.28%
Total votes		19,073	100.00%

Candijay Vice Mayoral Election
Party	Candidate	Votes	%
Nacionalista	Christopher Tutor	13,811	72.41%
PDP–Laban	Ann Piquero Dy	2,976	15.60%
Valid ballots		16,787	88.01%
Invalid or blank votes		2,286	11.99%
Total votes		19,073	100.00%

==== Carmen ====
- Electorate (2022): 35,225 (55 election returns)
- Turnout (2022): 30,668 (87.06%)

Incumbent mayor Ricardo Francisco Toribio was term limited. Meanwhile, incumbent vice-mayor Romeo Carbonilla Bigay Jr. was unopposed.

Carmen Mayoral Election
Party	Candidate	Votes	%
PDP–Laban	Conchita Toribio delos Reyes	15,471	50.45%
Nacionalista	Manuel Elizalde Tajale Clavite	13,124	42.79%
Valid ballots		28,595	93.24%
Invalid or blank votes		2,073	6.76%
Total votes		30,668	100.00%

Carmen Vice Mayoral Election
Party	Candidate	Votes	%
PDP–Laban	Romeo Carbonilla Bigay Jr.	22,340	72.84%
Valid ballots		22,340	72.84%
Invalid or blank votes		8,328	27.16%
Total votes		30,668	100.00%

==== Dimiao ====
- Electorate (2022): 11,141 (35 election returns)
- Turnout (2022): 9,704 (87.10%)

Incumbent mayor Randolph Ang won against incumbent vice mayor Gilberto Lagua.

Dimiao Mayoral Election
Party	Candidate	Votes	%
Nacionalista	Randolph Ang	5,617	57.88%
PDP–Laban	Gilberto Lagua	3,555	36.63%
Valid ballots		9,172	94.52%
Invalid or blank votes		532	5.48%
Total votes		9,704	100.00%

Dimiao Vice Mayoral Election
Party	Candidate	Votes	%
PFP	Jessie Tagupa Paluga	6,421	66.17
Valid ballots		6,421	66.17%
Invalid or blank votes		3,283	33.83%
Total votes		9,704	100.00%

==== Duero ====
- Electorate (2022): 14,109 (28 election returns)
- Turnout (2022): 12,537 (88.86%)

Incumbent mayor Conrada Castino-Amparo was term limited. She vied for vice-mayor against the incumbent Gillian Ranga Achacoso but both were unsuccessful.

Duero Mayoral Election
Party	Candidate	Votes	%
Nacionalista	Al Cadorniga Taculad	6,216	49.58%
KANP	Emma Fe Peligro Bajade	3,465	49.58%
PDP–Laban	Custodio Castino Diao	1,731	13.81%
Aksyon	Ronald Achacoso Felisilda	619	4.94%
Valid ballots		12,031	95.96%
Invalid or blank votes		506	4.04%
Total votes		12,537	100.00%

Duero Vice Mayoral Election
Party	Candidate	Votes	%
Nacionalista	Hernes Alupit Bajao	4,398	35.08%
PDP–Laban	Conrada Castino Amparo	3,409	27.19%
KANP	Gillian Ranga Achacoso	3,220	25.68%
Aksyon	Rolando Achacoso Felisilda	690	5.50%
Valid ballots		11,717	93.46%
Invalid or blank votes		820	6.54%
Total votes		12,537	100.00%

==== Garcia Hernandez ====
- Electorate (2022): 18,085 (37 election returns)
- Turnout (2022): 14,928 (82.54%)

Incumbent mayor Tita Baja-Gallentes was term limited. She to ran in Sanguniang Panlalawigan and won with the highest vote. Meanwhile, incumbent vice mayor Miguelito Galendez seek for reelection but failed.

Garcia Hernandez Mayoral Election
Party	Candidate	Votes	%
Nacionalista	Filadelfo Jess Baja III	7,428	48.55%
PDP–Laban	Jone Jade Acapulco Bautista	6,797	45.53%
Valid ballots		14,045	94.08%
Invalid or blank votes		883	5.92%
Total votes		14,928	100.00%

Garcia Hernandez Vice Mayoral Election
Party	Candidate	Votes	%
Nacionalista	Antonia Jaminal Ladaga	7,245	48.53%
PDP–Laban	Miguelito Galendez	6,593	44.17%
Valid ballots		13,838	92.70%
Invalid or blank votes		1,090	7.30%
Total votes		14,928	100.00%

==== Guindulman ====
- Electorate (2022): 24,148 (40 election returns)
- Turnout (2022): 21,135 (87.52%)

Incumbent mayor Ma. Fe Añana-Piezas was term limited; she ran for vice mayor and won. Incumbent vice-mayor Martin Lagura Jr. failed on his bid for mayor of the town.

Guindulman Mayoral Election
Party	Candidate	Votes	%
Independent	Albino Balo	11,439	54.12%
PDP–Laban	Martin Lagura Jr.	8,063	38.15%
Independent	Alfredo Amora	387	1.83%
Independent	Maximilian Lloren	41	0.19%
Valid ballots		19,930	94.30%
Invalid or blank votes		1,205	5.70%
Total votes		21,135	100.00%

Guindulman Vice Mayoral Election
Party	Candidate	Votes	%
Nacionalista	Maria Fe Añana Piezas	9,834	46.53%
Independent	Luis Asa Janiola	5,826	27.57%
Independent	Edgar Sarabosing	2,229	10.55%
Independent	Christopher Tañedo	487	2.30%
Valid ballots		18,376	86.95%
Invalid or blank votes		2,759	13.05%
Total votes		21,135	100.00%

==== Jagna ====
- Electorate (2022): 24,338 (47 election returns)
- Turnout (2022): 21,753 (89.38%)

Incumbent mayor Joseph Rañola won against incumbent vice-mayor Theodore Abrenilla.

Jagna Mayoral Election
Party	Candidate	Votes	%
Reporma	Joseph Rañola	10,526	48.39%
PDP–Laban	Theodore Abrenilla	10,421	47.91%
Valid ballots		20,947	96.29%
Invalid or blank votes		806	3.71%
Total votes		21,753	100.00%

Jagna Vice Mayoral Election
Party	Candidate	Votes	%
Reporma	Teofisto Pagar Jr.	12,418	57.09%
PDP–Laban	Maricris Jamora	7,938	36.49%
Valid ballots		20,356	93.58%
Invalid or blank votes		1,397	6.42%
Total votes		21,753	100.00%

==== Lila ====
- Electorate (2022): 7,780 (18 election returns)
- Turnout (2022): 6,975 (89.65%)

Incumbents Arturo Piollo II and Regina Cahiles-Salazar were reelected.

Lila Mayoral Election
Party	Candidate	Votes	%
Nacionalista	Arturo Piollo II	3,549	50.88%
NUP	Frederick Raut	3,130	44.87%
Valid ballots		6,679	95.76%
Invalid or blank votes		296	4.24%
Total votes		6,975	100.00%

Lila Vice Mayoral Election
Party	Candidate	Votes	%
Nacionalista	Regina Cahiles Salazar	3,376	48.40%
NUP	Roger Mark Oculam	3,256	46.68%
Valid ballots		6,632	95.08%
Invalid or blank votes		343	4.92%
Total votes		6,975	100.00%

==== Loay ====
- Electorate (2022): 12,917 (27 election returns)
- Turnout (2022): 11,147 (86.30%)

Incumbents Hilario Ayuban and Rodrigo Cubarol Jr.were reelected. Cubarol was unopposed.

Loay Mayoral Election
Party	Candidate	Votes	%
PDP–Laban	Hilario Ayuban	9,576	85.91%
Independent	Joseph Lagumbay	465	4.17%
Valid ballots		10,041	90.08%
Invalid or blank votes		1,106	9.92%
Total votes		11,147	100.00%

Loay Vice Mayoral Election
Party	Candidate	Votes	%
PDP–Laban	Rodrigo Cubarol Jr.	9,129	81.90%
Valid ballots		9,129	81.90%
Invalid or blank votes		2,018	18.10%
Total votes		11,147	100.00%

==== Loboc ====
- Electorate (2022): 13,855 (31 election returns)
- Turnout (2022): 12,541 (90.52%)

Incumbent mayor Leon Calipusan did not seek for reelection. Vice-mayor Pablio Sumampong was term limited and ran for board member of the district.

Loboc Mayoral Election
Party	Candidate	Votes	%
Nacionalista	Raymond Gallardo Jala	6,430	51.27%
PDP–Laban	Enrique Baguio	5,646	45.02%
Valid ballots		12,076	96.29%
Invalid or blank votes		465	3.71%
Total votes		12,541	100.00%

Loboc Vice Mayoral Election
Party	Candidate	Votes	%
Nacionalista	Helen Calipusan Alaba	6,722	53.60%
PDP–Laban	Luisito Digal	4,935	39.35
Valid ballots		11,657	92.95%
Invalid or blank votes		884	7.05%
Total votes		12,541	100.00%

==== Mabini ====
- Electorate (2022): 19,861 (36 election returns)
- Turnout (2022): 17,601 (88.62%)

Incumbents Juanito Jayoma and Renato Tutor were both unsuccessful on their reelection bids.

Mabini Mayoral Election
Party	Candidate	Votes	%
Nacionalista	Ongie Grace Bernales-Lim	8,396	47.70%
PDP–Laban	Juanito Libres Jayoma	5,944	33.77%
WPP	Helen Jayoma Natan	2,282	12.97%
Valid ballots		16,622	94.44%
Invalid or blank votes		979	5.56%
Total votes		17,601	100.00%

Mabini Vice Mayoral Election
Party	Candidate	Votes	%
Nacionalista	Myra Fostanes Colis	8,034	45.65%
PDP–Laban	Renato Tutor	6,232	35.41%
WPP	Socrates Piquero Datahan	1,428	8.11%
Valid ballots		15,694	89.17%
Invalid or blank votes		1,907	10.83%
Total votes		17,601	100.00%

==== Pilar ====
- Electorate (2022): 19,243 (32 election returns)
- Turnout (2022): 16,906 (87.86%)

Former mayor Wilson Pajo unseated incumbent mayor Necitas Tabaranza Cubrado in a tight race. Meanwhile, incumbent vice mayor Eugenio Datahan II was reelected.

Pilar Mayoral Election
Party	Candidate	Votes	%
Nacionalista	Wilson Pajo	8,324	49.24%
NUP	Necitas Tabaranza Cubrado	7,599	44.95%
Valid ballots		15,923	94.19%
Invalid or blank votes		983	5.81%
Total votes		16,906	100.00%

Pilar Vice Mayoral Election
Party	Candidate	Votes	%
NUP	Eugenio Datahan II	9,525	56.34%
Nacionalista	James Capisos Ytaoc	5,435	32.15%
Valid ballots		14,960	88.49%
Invalid or blank votes		1,946	11.51%
Total votes		16,906	100.00%

==== Sevilla ====
- Electorate (2022): 8,146 (15 election returns)
- Turnout (2022): 7,286 (89.44%)

Incumbents Juliet Bucag-Dano and Richard Bucag were reelected.

Sevilla Mayoral Election
Party	Candidate	Votes	%
Nacionalista	Juliet Bucag-Dano	3,933	53.98%
PDP–Laban	Mercedita Ayco Adolfo	3,077	42.23%
Valid ballots		7,010	96.21%
Invalid or blank votes		276	3.79%
Total votes		7,286	100.00%

Sevilla Vice Mayoral Election
Party	Candidate	Votes	%
Nacionalista	Richard Bucag	3,748	51.44%
PDP–Laban	Rolan Cutin Pacatang	3,201	43.93%
Valid ballots		6,949	95.37%
Invalid or blank votes		337	4.63%
Total votes		7,286	100.00%

==== Sierra Bullones ====
- Electorate (2022): 17,853 (32 election returns)
- Turnout (2022): 15,452 (86.55%)

Incumbent mayor Simplicio Maestrado was term limited. She ran for vice-mayor and won. Incumbent vice-mayor Rey Yamaro ran for mayor but unsuccessful.

Sierra Bullones Mayoral Election
Party	Candidate	Votes	%
Nacionalista	Michael Doria	8,124	52.58%
PDP–Laban	Rey Yamaro	6,435	41.65%
Valid ballots		14,559	94.22%
Invalid or blank votes		893	5.78%
Total votes		15,452	100.00%

Sierra Bullones Vice Mayoral Election
Party	Candidate	Votes	%
Nacionalista	Simplicio Maestrado	7,170	46.40%
PDP–Laban	Rainfredo Buslon	6,883	44.54%
Valid ballots		14,053	90.95%
Invalid or blank votes		1,399	9.05%
Total votes		15,452	100.00%

==== Valencia ====
- Electorate (2022): 18,191 (39 election returns)
- Turnout (2022): 16,055 (88.26%)

Incumbent mayor Maria Katrina was term-limited, she ran for district representative. Meanwhile, incumbent second-termer vice-mayor Calixto Garcia ran for councilor instead but failed to secure a seat.

Valencia Mayoral Election
Party	Candidate	Votes	%
Nacionalista	Dionisio Neil Balite	6,952	43.30%
PDP–Laban	Manuela Purificacion Gan Garcia	4,917	30.63%
Aksyon	Barney Namoc Balingkit	3,242	20.19%
Valid ballots		15,111	94.12%
Invalid or blank votes		944	5.88%
Total votes		16,055	100.00%

Valencia Vice Mayoral Election
Party	Candidate	Votes	%
Aksyon	Aristotle Cometa	7,134	44.43%
Nacionalista	Rufa Cajoy Pajo^{5}	3,861	24.05%
PDP–Laban	Jorge Buslon	3,598	22.41%
Valid ballots		14,593	90.89%
Invalid or blank votes		1,462	9.11%
Total votes		16,055	100.00%

^5 Substituted Adelwisa Nambatac (NP).
