= Tropical Storm Kompasu =

Pacific tropical storm in 2021

Severe Tropical Storm Kompasu (Maring)
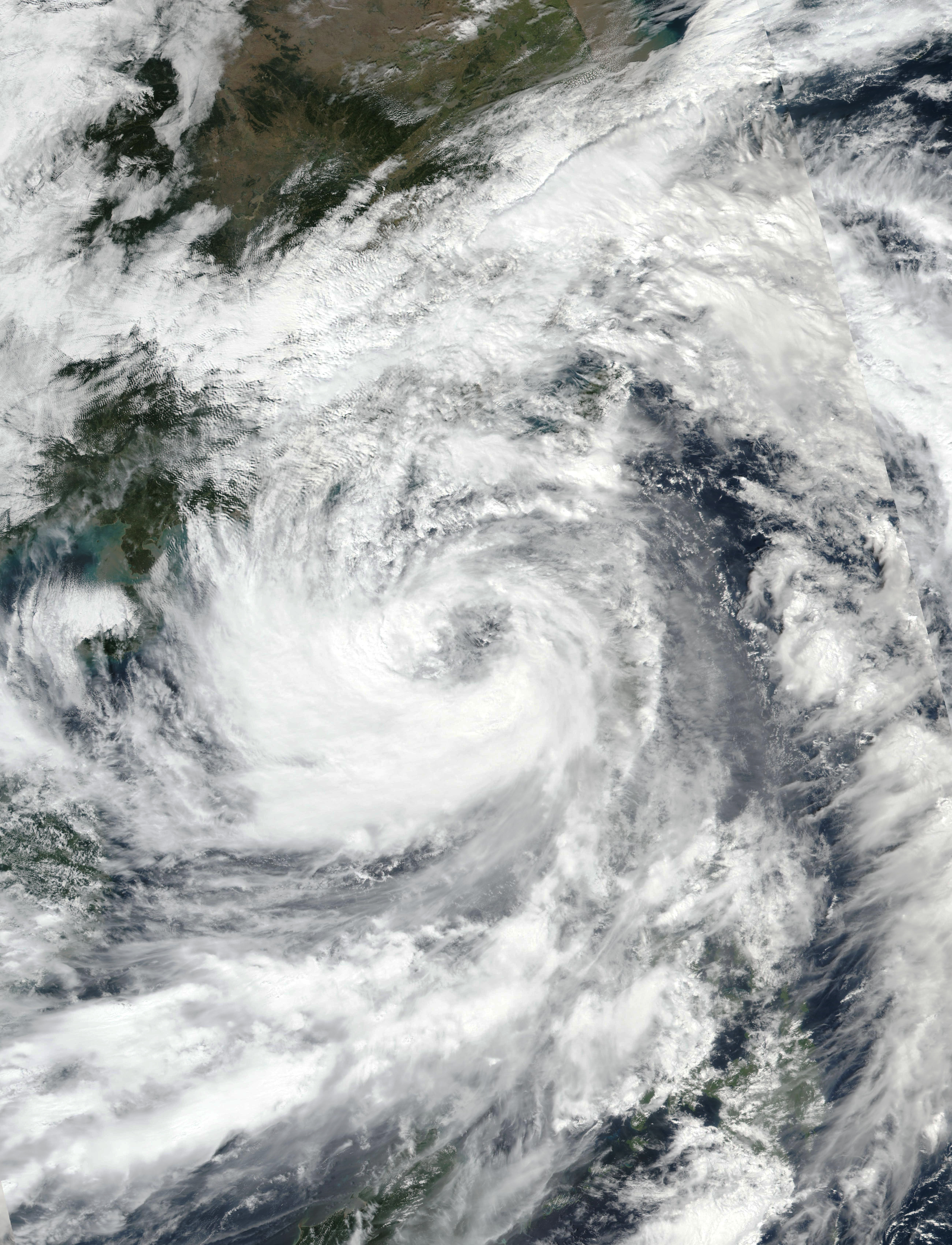
- Tropical Storm Kompasu at peak intensity while near Hainan on 12 October

Meteorological history
- Formed: October 7, 2021
- Dissipated: October 14, 2021

Severe tropical storm
- 10-minute sustained (JMA)
- Highest winds: 100 km/h (65 mph)
- Lowest pressure: 975 hPa (mbar); 28.79 inHg

Tropical storm
- 1-minute sustained (SSHWS/JTWC)
- Highest winds: 110 km/h (70 mph)
- Lowest pressure: 979 hPa (mbar); 28.91 inHg

Overall effects
- Fatalities: 46
- Missing: 21
- Damage: $545 million (2021 USD)
- Areas affected: Philippines, Taiwan, South China (particularly Hainan Island), Vietnam, Thailand
- IBTrACS
- Part of the 2021 Pacific typhoon season

Severe Tropical Storm Kompasu, (Note: The name Kompasu (Japanese: コンパス, [kõ̞mpa̠sɨ̥]) was contributed by Japan and refers to the constellation Circinus, the compass, in Japanese.) known in the Philippines as Severe Tropical Storm Maring, was a very large and deadly tropical cyclone that affected the Philippines, Taiwan, and southeast China in early October 2021. Part of the 2021 Pacific typhoon season, Kompasu originated from an area of low pressure east of the Philippines on 6 October 2021. The Japan Meteorological Agency (JMA) classified it as a tropical depression that day. A day later, the Philippine Atmospheric, Geophysical and Astronomical Services Administration (PAGASA) classified it as a tropical depression, naming it Maring. The cyclone was initially heavily disorganised, competing with another vortex, Tropical Depression Nando. Eventually, Maring became dominant, and the JMA reclassified it as a tropical storm, naming it Kompasu. Kompasu made landfall in Cagayan, Philippines, on 11 October 2021, and two days later, the storm made landfall in Hainan, China. The cyclone dissipated on 14 October 2021 while located over Vietnam.

The storm impacted many areas previously affected by Tropical Storm Lionrock a few days prior. Kompasu killed 46 people and 21 others were missing, majority of them were in the Philippines. The country also reported a damage of ₱8.3 billion (US$163 million). Total damage caused by the storm was US$545 million.

== Meteorological history ==
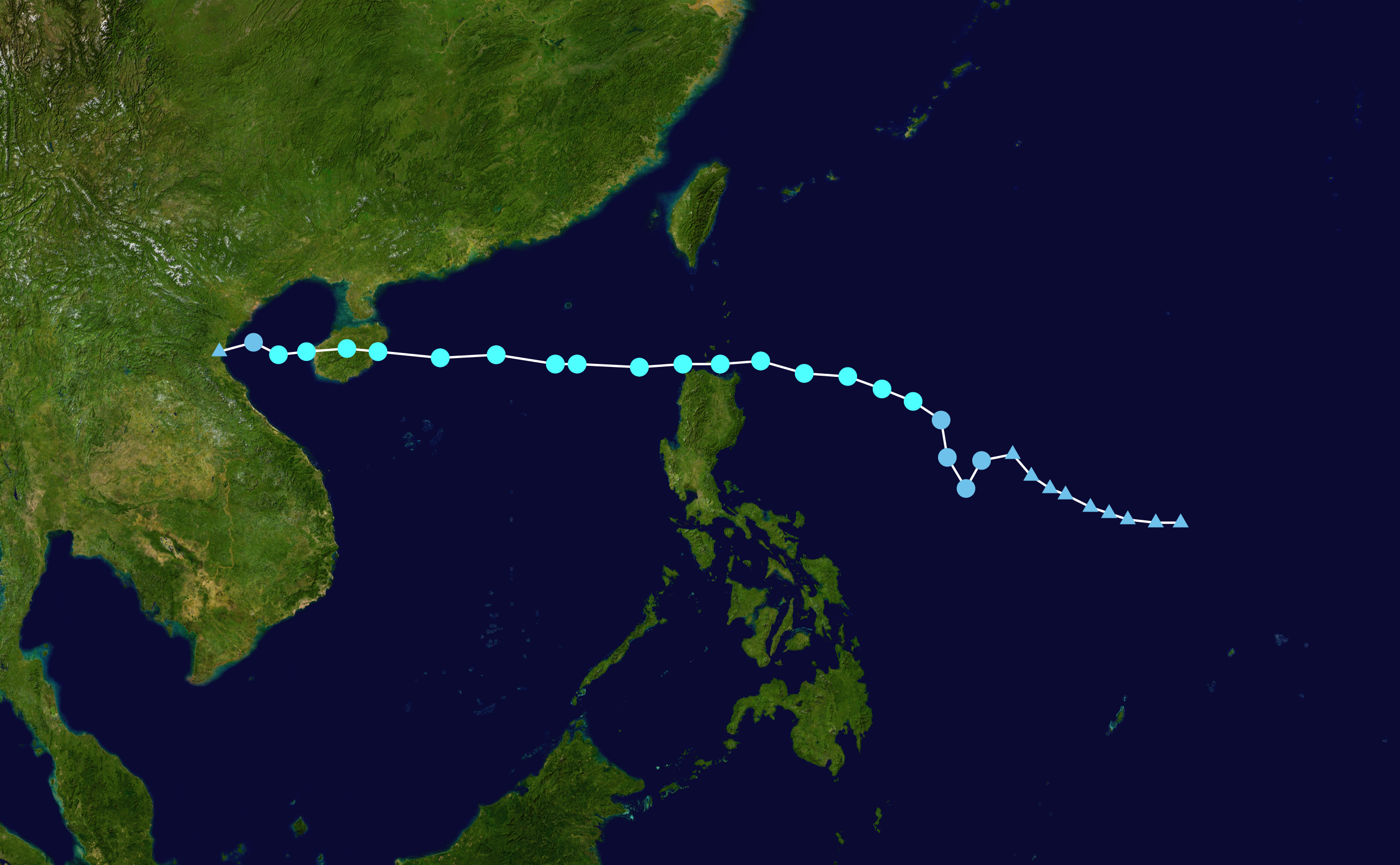
Map plotting the storm's track and intensity, according to the Saffir–Simpson scale Map key Saffir–Simpson scale Tropical depression (≤38 mph, ≤62 km/h) Tropical storm (39–73 mph, 63–118 km/h) Category 1 (74–95 mph, 119–153 km/h) Category 2 (96–110 mph, 154–177 km/h) Category 3 (111–129 mph, 178–208 km/h) Category 4 (130–156 mph, 209–251 km/h) Category 5 (≥157 mph, ≥252 km/h) Unknown Storm type Tropical cyclone Subtropical cyclone Extratropical cyclone, remnant low, tropical disturbance, or monsoon depression

At 18:00 UTC (Coordinated Universal Time) on 6 October 2021, the JMA noted that an area of low pressure embedded within a large monsoonal circulation had formed to the north of Palau. The system developed into a tropical depression at 00:00 UTC of the next day. At 09:00 UTC (17:00 PHT) on 7 October, PAGASA issued its first bulletin for the depression, and assigned it the name Maring. The JMA also noted the persistence of another, nearby tropical depression to its Northeast, later named Nando. As it is embedded in the same monsoonal depression and due to its proximity, Nando began to merge with Maring, and therefore formed a very broad and large circulation at a diameter of 1900 km, beating Lekima of 2007 by 200 km. This prompted the JMA to upgrade the overall system to a tropical storm, and was named Kompasu. However at that time, the JTWC still considered the system as two separate disturbances and issued separate TCFAs later in the day for both depressions, albeit noting the possibility of merging. The JTWC later considered the entire system as merged with their first warning for Kompasu.

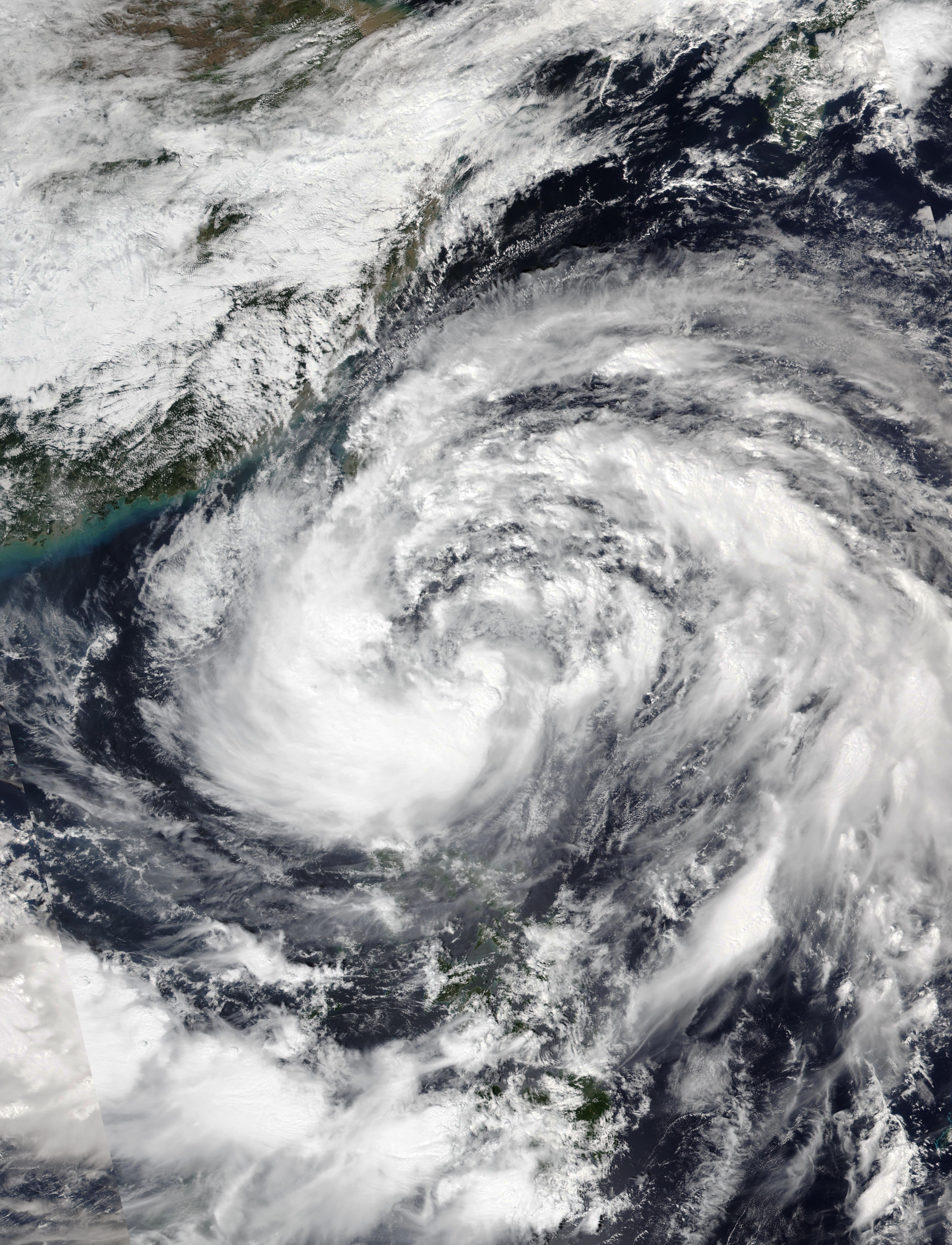
Severe Tropical Storm Kompasu approaching Luzon on 11 October

At midnight of 11 October, the JMA upgraded it to a severe tropical storm, as it attained good cloud characteristics. At 12:10 UTC (20:10 PHT) on 11 October, Kompasu made landfall on Fuga Island, Cagayan, as a severe tropical storm. At 05:00 PHT of 13 October (21:00 UTC of 12 October), the PAGASA issued its final bulletin as its exited the PAR and continued towards Hainan. Between 03:00 and 09:00 UTC of 13 October, Kompasu had made landfall over the east coast of Hainan. By 18:00 UTC, the JMA downgraded it to a tropical storm, as it crossed the entire island and entered the Gulf of Tonkin, as its convection had rapidly weakened because of the rough terrain of the island. At 09:00 UTC of the next day, the JTWC issued its final warning followed by downgrading to a tropical depression, as its convection had diminished and the low-level circulation center had been weakened significantly because of the increasing vertical wind shear and dry air, despite not making landfall over northern Vietnam. The JMA issued its final warning after downgrading it to a tropical depression at 18:00 UTC.

== Preparations and impact ==
=== Philippines ===
==== Highest Tropical Cyclone Wind Signal ====
Highest Tropical Cyclone Wind Signal issued by PAGASA for Kompasu (Maring) in each province. The white line represents the best track.

Around 2,000 people were evacuated as a precaution. On 12 October, the governments of Baguio, Ilocos Sur, and Pangasinan cancelled school and suspended work in government offices. According to the National Disaster Risk Reduction and Management Council (NDRRMC), the storm affected 1,203,448 people in the regions of Ilocos, Cagayan Valley, Central Luzon, Calabarzon, Mimaropa, Caraga, Western Visayas, and the CAR. The Department of Public Works and Highways reported that 15 national roads and highways nationwide were impassable due to flooding attributed to Maring (Kompasu) and Tropical Depression Nando. The NDRRMC reported that a total of 42 people died, 16 people were still missing, and five people were injured. Of the dead, nine people died in landslides in Benguet and five died in flash floods in Palawan. In La Trinidad, Benguet, three children died after a mudslide buried their home. In Cagayan, power outages were reported. Around 200 people were evacuated. Two people died after getting washed away by floodwaters, and ten people were rescued from flooded homes. The Office of the Vice-president dispatched two squads to help those who were affected by the storm in the provinces of La Union, Cagayan, Isabela, and Benguet. According to the NDRRMC, damage was calculated at ₱8.3 billion (US$163 million). The government of the Philippines distributed ₱17.9 million (US$352,000) worth of recovery items to people affected by the storm.

=== Hong Kong ===
The Hong Kong Observatory (HKO) issued the No. 8 Gale or Storm Signal during the approach of Kompasu, and kept it in force for over 23 hours. This was the longest No. 8 Signal ever recorded, beating the record of Tropical Storm Lionrock three days prior. Gale-force winds of over 43 mph (70 km/h) were generally recorded over the coastal areas, with gusts exceeding 56 mph (90 km/h) in some areas. The government opened 24 shelters, to which 255 people fled during the storm. There were 72 reports of fallen trees, and 10 reports of flooding. One person died, and 21 people were injured. Local economists estimated the cost of Kompasu to be HK$2–3 billion (US$257–386 million).

=== Macau ===
As Kompasu approached, the Meteorological and Geophysical Bureau hoisted the No. 8 Gale or storm force wind on 12 October and lasted for 19 hours. A man suffered minor injury during the storm, but overall effects were minimal.

=== China ===
Severe Tropical Storm Kompasu making its final landfall over Vietnam on October 13

On 13 October 2021, heavy rains affected Zhejiang, Fujian, Guangdong, and Hainan provinces. In Guangdong, a total of 30 cities and counties suspended classes, the highest since Typhoon Mangkhut in 2018. Heavy rain lashed Shenzhen, where construction sites and tourist attractions were shut down. The Yantian Port, one of the world's busiest ports, was closed, causing a maritime traffic jam. The direct economic loss reached ¥750 million (US$117 million).

==== Hainan ====
Authorities in Hainan closed three ports, and all schools were closed in Haikou. Trees were brought down in Hainan, with firefighters clearing debris from roads. The storm was the strongest to hit the island in five years.

=== Vietnam ===
Despite weakened significantly before striking Vietnam, Kompasu still brought heavy rains to the Central region and caused flooding. The storm left three dead and five missing. 76 landslides were reported, majority of them were occurred in Nghệ An province and Quảng Nam province. 1,976 ha (4,880 acres) of rice and 59 ha (150 acres) of crops and ornamental plants were swept away. In Bố Trạch district, houses were flooded by waters with a depth of 1.2 m (3.9 ft). Damage across the country was amounted to ₫176 billion (US$7.72 million).

=== Elsewhere ===
The Central Weather Bureau issued advisories for heavy rain for northern and eastern parts of Taiwan. Heavy rain was reported in numerous areas, including the Taipei–Keelung metropolitan area. The Thai Meteorological Department had issued heavy rain forecasts for the country's upper Isan region, but the rains eased off as the storm rapidly lost strength following its landfall in Vietnam.

== Retirement ==
After the season, PAGASA announced that the name Maring would be removed from its list of typhoon names after it caused ₱1 billion in damages and will no longer be used in the future. On 21 March 2022, the PAGASA chose the name Mirasol, which is derived from a sunflower, as its replacement for the 2025 season, but was also retired after its usage.

In early 2023, the Typhoon Committee announced that the name Kompasu, along with two others will be removed from the naming lists. In the spring of 2024, the name was replaced with Tokei, which means clock (Horologium) for future seasons.

== See also ==
- Weather of 2021
- Tropical cyclones in 2021
- Typhoon Damrey (2005) – a tropical cyclone that took a similar path in late September 2005.
- Typhoon Hagupit (2008) – a strong typhoon made landfall near Hainan as a Category-4 typhoon, also had a similar track in September 2008.
- Typhoon Nuri (2008) – a category-3 typhoon that have a similar strength and path in August 2008.
- Tropical Storm Nock-ten (2011) – A storm with a similar track.
- Typhoon Rammasun (2014) – a category-5 typhoon that caused widespread destruction over Hainan.
- Typhoon Kalmaegi (2014) – another large tropical cyclone that also took a similar track in September 2014.
- Tropical Storm Son-Tinh (2018) – took a similar track and affected the Philippines, South China and Vietnam in July 2018.
- Tropical Storm Nangka (2020) – made landfall in Hainan and Vietnam a year prior with similar intensity.
- Typhoon Doksuri (2023) – a powerful typhoon that also struck Fuga Island two years later.
- Tropical Storm Trami (2024) – a similar-tracking storm with a similar intensity which impacted the same areas three years later.
