= Arthur C. Yap =

Filipino politician (born 1965)

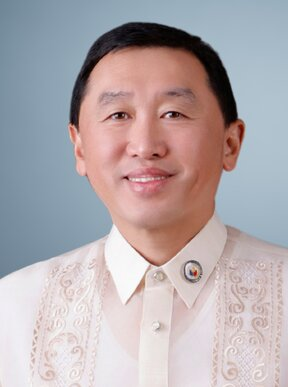
- Official portrait, 2025

Member of the Philippine House of Representatives
- Incumbent
- Assumed office October 2, 2025
- Preceded by: Position established
- Constituency: Party-list (Murang Kuryente)
- In office June 30, 2010 – June 30, 2019
- Preceded by: Adam Jala
- Succeeded by: Kristine Alexie Besas-Tutor
- Constituency: Bohol (3rd district)

26th Governor of Bohol
- In office June 30, 2019 – June 30, 2022
- Vice Governor: Rene Relampagos
- Preceded by: Edgar Chatto
- Succeeded by: Aris Aumentado

41st Secretary of Agriculture
- In office October 25, 2006 – February 24, 2010
- President: Gloria Macapagal Arroyo
- Preceded by: Domingo F. Panganiban
- Succeeded by: Bernie Fondevilla
- In office August 23, 2004 – June 30, 2005
- Preceded by: Luis Lorenzo
- Succeeded by: Domingo F. Panganiban

Personal details
- Born: Arthur Cua Yap; November 10, 1965 (age 60) Manila, Philippines
- Party: Murang Kuryente (partylist; 2024–present); NPC (2012–2017; 2024–present)
- Other political affiliations: Lakas (2004–2012); PDP (2017–2024)
- Spouse: Carolyne Varquez-Gow
- Children: 2
- Education: Ateneo de Manila University (A.B., JD)

Arthur "Art" Cua Yap (Chinese: 黃嚴輝; Pe̍h-ōe-jī: N̂g Gân-hui; pinyin: Huáng Yánhuī; born November 10, 1965) is a Filipino lawyer and politician who is the former governor of Bohol from 2019 to 2022. He was the secretary of the Department of Agriculture under the Arroyo administration from 2004 to 2005 and from 2006 to 2007. He became a member of the House of Representatives of the Philippines, representing the 3rd District of Bohol from 2010 to 2019, and the Murang Kuryente Partylist from 2025.

== Early life and education ==
Yap was born on November 10, 1965, in Manila. He is the eldest among the three children of Domingo Yap and Natividad Cua. His father was born in Jolo, Sulu and is of Chinese-Tausug descent while his mother, also with Chinese ancestry, was from Dagupan, Pangasinan.

For his elementary and high school education, Yap studied at Xavier School from 1973 to 1983. He went to Ateneo de Manila University for college and graduated in 1987 with a degree in management economics. He was a dean’s lister during this time and had Gloria Macapagal Arroyo as his economics professor. He was also a student leader in high school and college, and was present at EDSA during the People Power Revolution. He went to the Ateneo de Manila University School of Law for his Juris Doctor's degree and was admitted to the bar in 1992.

== Career ==
While studying, Yap was recruited by a professor to join the Balane, Barican, Cruz, Alampay Law Office. He worked there for about two years. After being admitted to the bar, he was recommended by Fr. Joaquin Bernas to join the law office of former Associate Justice Adolfo Azcuna. Because of that, he became an associate lawyer of the Azcuna, Yorac, Sarmiento, Arroyo, Cua Law Office.

In the late 1990s, Yap co-founded a law office with Paulino Ejercito and Karlo Butiong. The latter served as the external corporate counsel for DHY Realty and Development Inc., a family-owned corporation in which Yap and his father held the positions of vice president and president, respectively. This company became the subject of a tax evasion complaint filed by the Bureau of Internal Revenue, alleging actions dating back to 1997. However, this complaint was subsequently dismissed by the Department of Justice in October 2005.

Yap first entered government service in August 2001 as president and CEO of the Philippine International Trading Corporation under the Department of Trade and Industry. Thereafter, he served as the administrator of the National Food Authority for two years and as Agriculture Undersecretary for Luzon Operations, after which was a brief stint as the Secretary of Agriculture. He was one of the youngest to be appointed to the Cabinet of President Gloria Macapagal Arroyo. He was also designated as the Development Champion for the North Luzon Agribusiness Quadrangle (NLAQ). He then left the post in July 2005 to give way to Domingo Panganiban.

In December 2005, he became Presidential Adviser for Job Creation. He then became the 15th Director General of the Presidential Management Staff, the fifth post he had been designated to in the Arroyo administration. He was appointed again as Agriculture Secretary in October 2006, serving until his resignation in February 2010 to run as a member of the House of Representatives.

From 2010 to 2019, Yap was a congressman representing the third district of Bohol. While there, he held various positions such as being assistant minority leader of the Committee on Rules, vice-chairman of the Committees on Globalization And WTO, Government Enterprises And Privatization, and Ecology, chairman of the Committees on Reforestation and Economic Affairs, and being the deputy speaker from 2018 to 2019.

During the 2019 Philippine gubernatorial elections, Yap ran for governor of Bohol under PDP–Laban, the party of President Rodrigo Duterte. His opponents included former Cabinet Secretary Leoncio Evasco. Yap won by a slim margin of 2,161 votes garnering 326,895 votes against Evasco’s 324,734. He took his oath on June 30, 2019, officially becoming Bohol's 26th governor. During his tenure, in 2021, he proposed the construction of Bohol Arena, a multi-purpose indoor arena that would become the largest project he proposed, with a budget of ₱200 million.

Yap, with only 283,903 lost to Erico Aristotle Aumentado who garnered 469,736 in the 2022 Bohol local elections.

== Controversies ==
In a January 18, 2023 14-page SC Third Division Decision, Justice Japar Dimaampao ordered the dismissal of Philippine Rice Research Institute car plan charges against Yap based on violation of his speedy trial rights.

The Supreme Court’s Third Division, in a 29-page April 15, 2024 Judgment granted Yap's Petition for review on Certiorari against the Sandiganbayan’s Third Division ruling. He was acquitted of alleged two counts of graft and misuse of congressional 2007 to 2009 pork barrel.

== Personal life ==
Yap is married to Carolyne Varquez-Gow, a native of Loboc, Bohol. Together they have 2 children. He speaks Tagalog, English and Cebuano (both Standard and Boholano dialect).

== Electoral history ==
Electoral history of Arthur C. Yap
Year	Office	Party	Votes received				Result
Year	Office	Party	Total	%	P.	Swing	Result
2010	Representative (Bohol–3rd)	Lakas	136,164	100.00%	1st	—N/a	Unopposed
2013	Representative (Bohol–3rd)	NPC	127,909	100.00%	1st	—N/a	Unopposed
2016	Representative (Bohol–3rd)	NPC	121,093	57.39%	1st	—N/a	Won
2019	Governor of Bohol	PDP–Laban	326,895	49.65%	1st	—N/a	Won
2025	Representative (Party-list)	Murang Kuryente	247,754	0.63%	58th	—N/a	Won (Note: Party-list proclaimed after the registration of Duterte Youth was declared void ab initio, leaving three seats vacant, one of which was filled by the party.)

== Notes ==
Political offices
Preceded by Edgar Chatto	Governor of Bohol; 2019–2022	Succeeded by Erico Aristotle Aumentado
Government offices
Preceded by Domingo F. Panganiban	Secretary of Agriculture; 2006–2010	Succeeded by Proceso Alcala
Preceded by Luis P. Lorenzo Jr.	Secretary of Agriculture; 2004–2005	Succeeded by Domingo F. Panganiban
House of Representatives of the Philippines
Preceded by Adam Relson Jala	Member of the House of Representatives from Bohol's 3rd district 2010–2019	Succeeded by Kristine Alexie Besas-Tutor
