= Hengqin Bridge =

Bridge in Zhuhai, Guangdong, China

Coordinates: 22.16099°N 113.51745°E

- Simplified Chinese: 横琴大桥
- Traditional Chinese: 橫琴大橋
Transcriptions
Standard Mandarin
- Hanyu Pinyin: Héngqín Dàqiáo
Yue: Cantonese
- Jyutping: waang4 kam4 daai6 kiu4

Hengqin Bridge (Chinese: 横琴大桥) is a suspension bridge in Zhuhai, Guangdong, China. It is 1,425 meters (4,675 ft) in length and was constructed at a cost of CNY 320 million.

== History ==
Construction started in 1992 and the bridge was completed in 1999. Prior to 2013 it was the only bridge linking the city of Zhuhai and Hengqin. The bridge carries 6 lanes of traffic of Huandao Road across the Hongwan Waterway, a channel connecting the Xi River/Modaomen River and Praia Grande Bay.
