= Bohol Arena =

Arena in Talibon, Bohol, Philippines

- Location: San Roque, Talibon, Bohol, Philippines
- Owner: Provincial Government of Bohol (PGBh)
- Operator: Department of Public Works and Highways (DPWH)
- Capacity: TBA

Construction
- Groundbreaking: 2021 (Phase I)
- Opened: TBA
- Cost: ₱200 million

Bohol Arena is a proposed multi-purpose indoor arena to be constructed in San Roque, Talibon, Bohol, Philippines. The arena is planned to serve as a venue for big events, sports activities and as an evacuation center for calamities. The project cost is ₱200 million and it is the largest project proposed by Former Bohol Governor Arthur Yap. It would be owned by the Provincial Government of Bohol (PGBh) and the Department of Public Works and Highways (DPWH) is intended to set the preparatory activities and to conceptualize the detailed engineering design of the said project.
