= 2016 Philippine House of Representatives elections in Central Visayas =

Elections were held in Central Visayas for seats in the House of Representatives of the Philippines on May 9, 2016.

== Summary ==
Party	Popular vote	%	Swing	Seats won	Change
Liberal	1,000,055			7	
NPC	431,414			3	
UNA	377,992			1	
NUP	277,935			1	
Nacionalista	186,091			1	
Independent	43,057			1	
PDP–Laban	140,175				
1-Cebu	114,732				
PGRP	807				
Valid votes	2,572,258			14	
Invalid votes	495,692				
Turnout	3,067,950				
Registered voters					

== Bohol ==
Each of Bohol's three legislative districts will elect each representative to the House of Representatives. The candidate with the highest number of votes wins the seat.

=== 1st District ===
Rene Relampagos is the incumbent.

Philippine House of Representatives election at Bohol's 1st district
Party	Candidate	Votes	%
Liberal	Rene Relampagos	147,405	79.47%
UNA	Joahna Cabalit-Initay	28,516	15.37%
PDP–Laban	Cresencio Alturas	9,547	5.14%
Invalid or blank votes		49,307	
Total votes		234,775	100.00%

=== 2nd District ===
Erico Aristotle Aumentado is the incumbent. Veteran provincial board member Gerardo Garcia challenged him for the seat.

Philippine House of Representatives election at Bohol's 2nd district
Party	Candidate	Votes	%
NPC	Erico Aristotle Aumentado	134,537	72.94%
NUP	Gerardo Garcia	49,909	27.05%
Invalid or blank votes		37,071	
Total votes		221,517	100.00%

=== 3rd District ===
Arthur Yap is the incumbent. He is vying for his third and last term as congressman. Former Carmen mayor Conchita Toribio-delos Reyes challenged him for the seat. This is also the first time that Yap is running with an opponent.

Philippine House of Representatives election at Bohol's 3rd district
Party	Candidate	Votes	%
NPC	Arthur Yap	121,854	57.25%
PDP–Laban	Conchita Toribio-delos Reyes	90,973	42.74%
Invalid or blank votes		24,239	
Total votes		237,066	100.00%

== Cebu ==
Each of Cebu's Six and 3 others legislative districts will elect each representative to the House of Representatives. The candidate with the highest number of votes wins the seat.

=== 1st District ===
Samsam Gullas is the incumbent.

Philippine House of Representatives election at Cebu's 1st district
Party	Candidate	Votes	%
Nacionalista	Samsam Gullas	186,091	65.22%
NPC	Antonio Canoy	92,589	32.45%
PDP–Laban	Michael Nuñez	6,612	2.31%
Invalid or blank votes		37,380	
Total votes		322,672	100.00%

=== 2nd District ===
Wilfredo Caminero is the incumbent.

Philippine House of Representatives election at Cebu's 2nd district
Party	Candidate	Votes	%
Liberal	Wilfredo Caminero	81,167	80.75%
1-Cebu	Teresita Celis	11,893	11.83%
UNA	Cora-Lou Kintanar	7,453	7.41%
Invalid or blank votes		24,108	
Total votes		124,621	100.00%

=== 3rd District ===
Gwendolyn Garcia is the incumbent.

Philippine House of Representatives election at Cebu's 3rd district
Party	Candidate	Votes	%
UNA	Gwendolyn Garcia	140,097	62.17%
Liberal	Grecilda Sanchez-Zaballero	83,023	36.84%
Independent	Teodoro Osorio	2,206	0.97%
Invalid or blank votes		53,321	
Total votes		278,647	100.00%

=== 4th District ===
Benhur Salimbangon is the incumbent

Philippine House of Representatives election at Cebu's 4th district
Party	Candidate	Votes	%
NUP	Benhur Salimbangon	135,437	60.93%
Liberal	Celestino Martinez Jr.	86,836	39.06%
Invalid or blank votes		33,400	
Total votes		255,673	100.00%

=== 5th District ===
Joseph Ace Durano is not running, his brother Ramon Durano VI is the party's nominee.

Philippine House of Representatives election at Cebu's 5th district
Party	Candidate	Votes	%
NPC	Ramon Durano VI	172,659	87.60%
UNA	Gilbert Wagas	24,425	12.39%
Invalid or blank votes		76,743	
Total votes		273,827	100.00%

=== 6th District ===
Gabriel Luis Quisumbing is the incumbent but he is running for Mayor of Mandaue City, incumbent mayor Jonas Cortes is the party's nominee.

Philippine House of Representatives election at Cebu's 6th district
Party	Candidate	Votes	%
Liberal	Jonas Cortes	154,524	72.50%
1-Cebu	Paulus Cañete	58,586	27.49%
Invalid or blank votes		37,489	
Total votes		250,599	100.00%

=== 7th District ===
Pablo John Garcia will run for the newly created 7th District against Board Member Peter John Calderon. His sister Gwendolyn Garcia, is also running for a seat in the House of Representatives respectively.

Philippine House of Representatives election at Cebu's 7th district
Party	Candidate	Votes	%
Liberal	Peter John Calderon	58,616	56.98%
1-Cebu	Pablo John Garcia	44,253	43.01%
Invalid or blank votes		20,645	
Total votes		123,514	100.00%

== Cebu City ==
Each of Cebu City's 2 legislative districts will elect each representative to the House of Representatives. The candidate with the highest number of votes wins the seat.

=== 1st District ===
Raul del Mar is the incumbent.

Philippine House of Representatives election at Cebu City's 1st district
Party	Candidate	Votes	%
Liberal	Raul del Mar	134,940	66.26%
UNA	Alvin Garcia	64,348	31.59%
Independent	Ricardo Adlawan	2,400	1.17%
Independent	Juan Arenasa	1,952	0.95%
Invalid or blank votes		31,613	
Total votes		235,253	100.00%

=== 2nd District ===
Rodrigo Abellanosa is the incumbent.

Philippine House of Representatives election at Cebu City's 2nd district
Party	Candidate	Votes	%
Liberal	Rodrigo Abellanosa	149,259	59.28%
UNA	Gerardo Carillo	97,491	38.72%
Independent	Lea Ong	5,022	1.99%
Invalid or blank votes		37,825	
Total votes		289,597	100.00%

== Lapu-Lapu City ==
Aileen Radaza is the incumbent.

Philippine House of Representatives election at Lapu-Lapu City
Party	Candidate	Votes	%
Liberal	Aileen Radaza	86,069	64.63%
PDP–Laban	Celsi Sitoy	33,043	24.81%
UNA	Reynaldo Berdin	5,967	4.48%
Independent	Paulo Cabahug	3,875	2.90%
NPC	Rene Espina	2,364	1.77%
Independent	Niño Luis Jamili	1,038	0.77%
PGRP	Junex Doronio	807	0.60%
Invalid or blank votes		25,027	
Total votes		158,190	100.00%

== Siquijor ==
Marie Anne Pernes (LP) is the incumbent.

Philippine House of Representatives election at Siquijor's Lone district
Party	Candidate	Votes	%
Independent	Ramon Vicente Antonio Rocamora	22,125	40.61%
Liberal	Marie Anne Pernes	18,216	33.43%
UNA	Orlando Fua Jr.	9,695	17.79%
Independent	Carl Mark Ganhinhin	4,439	8.14%
Invalid or blank votes		7,524	
Total votes		61,999	100.00%
