= Modaomen Waterway =

Section of the Pearl River in South China

The Modaomen Waterway (磨刀门水道) refers to the section of the Xi River from Baiqingtou to Denglongshan in Da'ao Town, Xinhui District, Jiangmen City, with a total length of about 44 kilometers.

== Description ==
Legend has it that because it flows between Modaoshan and Xiaotuoshan, it was named Modaomen Waterway, connecting the West River and the North River. The average runoff at the Modaomen Denglongshan Station is 88.396 billion cubic meters over the years, accounting for 31.85% of the total runoff of the eight major Pearl River outlets into the sea. The average annual sediment transport volume of the waterway is 23.41 million tons, accounting for about 33% of the total sediment transported by the eight major Pearl River outlets into the sea . After renovation, the Modaomen Waterway can accommodate 1,000-ton ships all year round.

In the Qing dynasty, it was under the jurisdiction of Xiangshan County, Guangzhou Prefecture. There are Baishizhou, Denglongzhou, and Weijiashi reef islands in the water mouth. In the old days, there were two artillery batteries at Datuoshan, Modaojiao, stationed at Weijiamen (outer entrance of Modaomen). The Modaojiao artillery battery was stationed with a captain of Xiangshan Auxiliary Camp and 25 soldiers.
