= Mahanay Island =

Island in the Philippines

- Interactive map of Mahanay Island

Geography
- Location: Camotes Sea
- Coordinates: 10°11′20″N 124°14′00″E
- Archipelago: Philippine archipelago
- Area: 10.26 km^{2} (3.96 sq mi)
- Length: 7.5 km (4.66 mi)
- Width: 2.1 km (1.3 mi)
- Highest elevation: 9 m (30 ft)

Administration
- Philippines
- Region: Central Visayas
- Province: Bohol
- Municipality: Talibon (east 2/3rds); Getafe (west 1/3rd)

Demographics
- Population: 2,344 (2015)
- Pop. density: 228.5/km^{2} (591.8/sq mi)

Additional information
- Time zone: PST (UTC+8)

Mahanay Island is a small island in Central Visayas in the Philippines. It is slightly north of Bohol island, with Banacon island and its surrounding reef to the north, Handayan Island to the west, and Tambu, Banbanon, and Bansaan Islands to the east. The island is also one of the country's twenty one protected coastal areas under Executive Order 117.

== Population ==
As of 2015, the island has a population of 2,344, of which 1,806 (or 77%) live in the Talibon Municipality, with the remaining 538 (or 23%) living in the Getafe Municipality, which makes up the western third of the island. This is a slight increase from the island's 2010 population of 2,143. The island's primary access is via a short boat trip from Getafe or Talibon. Seaweed farming is one of the livelihood in the island.
