= Getafe, Bohol =

Municipality in Bohol, Philippines

Getafe Jetafe
- Municipality
- Municipality of Getafe
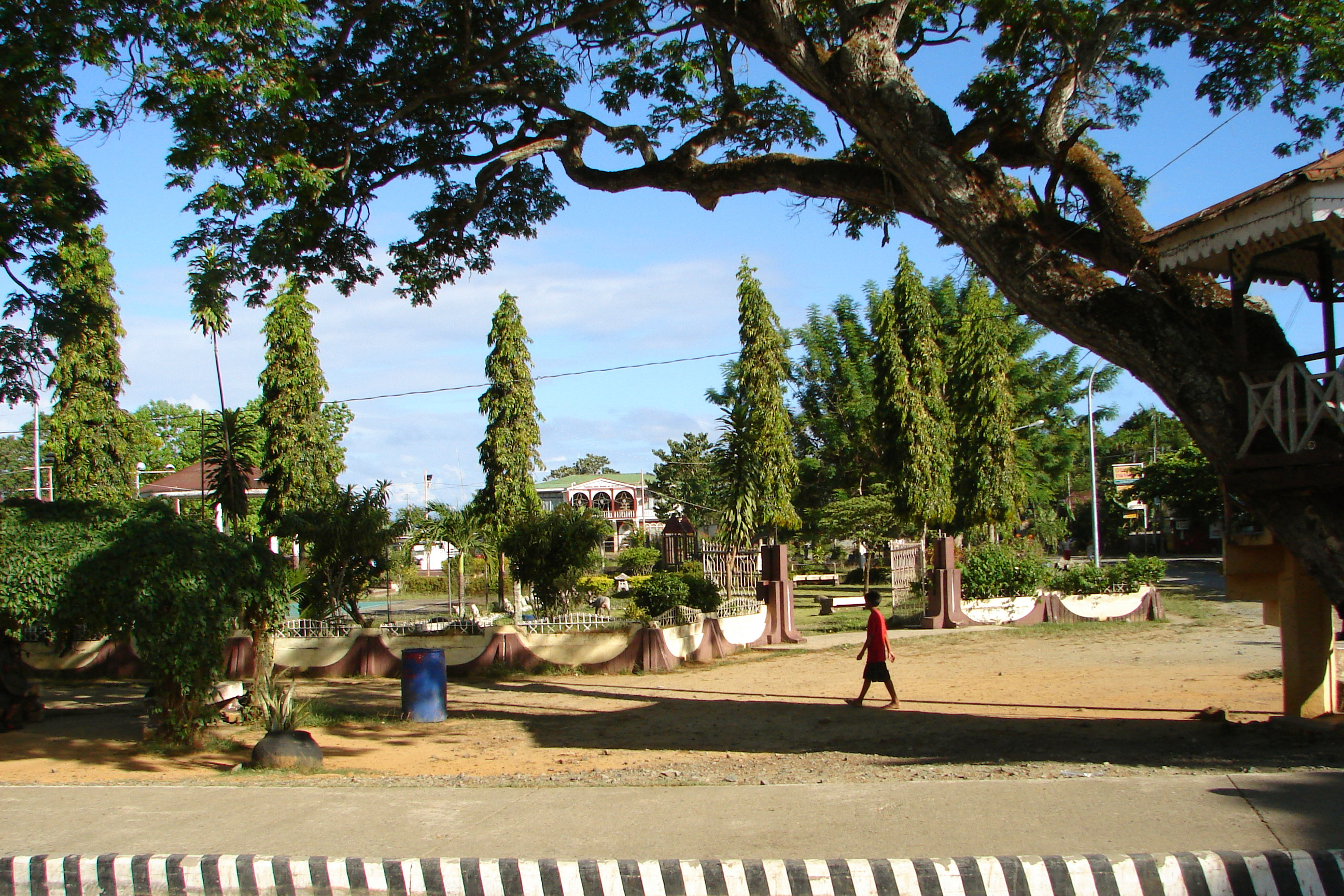
- Poblacion of Getafe

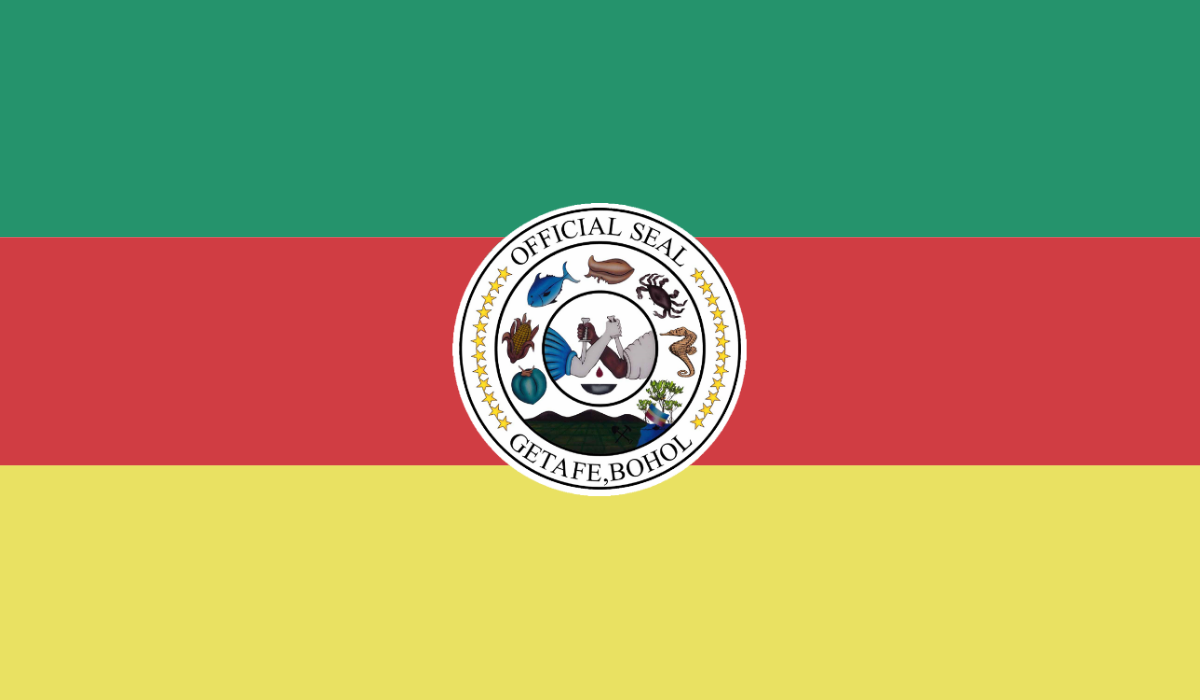
- Flag Seal

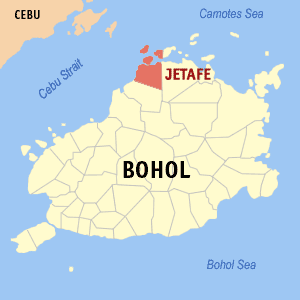
- Map of Bohol with Getafe highlighted
- Interactive map of Getafe
- Location within the Philippines
- Coordinates: 10°09′N 124°09′E
- Country: Philippines
- Region: Central Visayas
- Province: Bohol
- District: 2nd district
- Founded: 1874
- Barangays: 24 (see Barangays)

Government
  - Type: Sangguniang Bayan
  - Mayor: Cary M. Camacho
  - Vice Mayor: Casey Shawn M. Camacho
  - Representative: Maria Vanessa Cadorna-Aumentado
  - Municipal Council: Members: Ramil T. Botero; Eduardo A. Torremocha; Marcelino C. Mejias; Jonas T. Socias; Mario P. Monillas; Prince Dayaw G. Lugod; Felipe S. Pogoy; Norberto B. Cabañero; NB COMELEC
  - Electorate: 22,773 voters (2025)

Area
  - Total: 120.50 km^{2} (46.53 sq mi)
- Elevation: 12 m (39 ft)
- Highest elevation: 173 m (568 ft)
- Lowest elevation: −2 m (−6.6 ft)

Population (2024 census)
  - Total: 33,485
  - Density: 277.88/km^{2} (719.72/sq mi)
  - Households: 7,535

Economy
  - Income class: 2nd municipal income class
  - Poverty incidence: 19.67% (2023)
  - Revenue: ₱ 228.7 million (2024)
  - Assets: ₱ 567.5 million (2024)
  - Expenditure: ₱ 81.33 million (2024)
  - Liabilities: ₱ 127.5 million (2024)

Service provider
  - Electricity: Bohol 2 Electric Cooperative (BOHECO 2)
- Time zone: UTC+8 (PST)
- ZIP code: 6334
- PSGC: 071226000
- IDD : area code: +63 (0)38
- Native languages: Boholano dialect Cebuano; Tagalog

Getafe, officially the Municipality of Getafe (Cebuano: Munisipyo sa Getafe; Tagalog: Bayan ng Getafe) and also spelled as Jetafe, is a municipality in the province of Bohol, Philippines. According to the 2024 census, it has a population of 33,485 people.

Getafe celebrates its feast on the last Saturday of January, to honor the town patron Holy Infant.

== Geography ==
Getafe also includes the islands of Jandayan (Handayan), Banacon, and the western part of Mahanay. The small islands of Nasingin and Pandanon are considered to be one of the most densely populated islands in the world. The Danajon Bank, the only double barrier reef in the Philippines passes through these islands. Getafe is 92 kilometres (57 mi) from Tagbilaran.

=== Barangays ===
Getafe is politically subdivided into 24 barangays. Each barangay consists of puroks and some have sitios.

PSGC	Barangay	Population			±% p.a.	
		2024		2010		
071226001	Alumar	3.5%	1,164	935	▴	1.53%
071226002	Banacon	3.9%	1,298	1,304	▾	−0.03%
071226003	Buyog	2.7%	906	775	▴	1.09%
071226004	Cabasakan	3.5%	1,179	1,149	▴	0.18%
071226006	Campao Occidental	1.4%	484	418	▴	1.02%
071226007	Campao Oriental	3.1%	1,034	963	▴	0.50%
071226008	Cangmundo	2.9%	972	968	▴	0.03%
071226009	Carlos P. Garcia	3.0%	994	858	▴	1.03%
071226010	Corte Baud	2.6%	868	704	▴	1.47%
071226011	Handumon	3.5%	1,172	983	▴	1.23%
071226012	Jagoliao	4.0%	1,353	1,478	▾	−0.61%
071226013	Jandayan Norte	2.9%	963	901	▴	0.46%
071226014	Jandayan Sur	4.6%	1,538	1,360	▴	0.86%
071226015	Mahanay (Mahanay Island)	1.6%	538	484	▴	0.74%
071226016	Nasingin	6.1%	2,045	1,809	▴	0.86%
071226017	Pandanon	6.7%	2,228	1,840	▴	1.34%
071226018	Poblacion	8.0%	2,695	2,371	▴	0.89%
071226019	Saguise	4.9%	1,652	1,358	▴	1.37%
071226020	Salog	3.6%	1,195	1,036	▴	1.00%
071226021	San Jose	5.2%	1,729	1,432	▴	1.32%
071226022	Santo Niño	2.3%	768	686	▴	0.79%
071226023	Taytay	4.6%	1,536	1,334	▴	0.98%
071226024	Tugas	2.6%	886	896	▾	−0.08%
071226025	Tulang	5.3%	1,758	1,746	▴	0.05%
	Total		33,485	27,788	▴	1.30%

=== Climate ===
Climate data for Getafe, Bohol
Month	Jan	Feb	Mar	Apr	May	Jun	Jul	Aug	Sep	Oct	Nov	Dec	Year
Mean daily maximum °C (°F)	28 (82)	28 (82)	29 (84)	31 (88)	31 (88)	30 (86)	30 (86)	30 (86)	30 (86)	29 (84)	29 (84)	28 (82)	29 (85)
Mean daily minimum °C (°F)	23 (73)	23 (73)	23 (73)	23 (73)	24 (75)	24 (75)	24 (75)	24 (75)	24 (75)	24 (75)	24 (75)	23 (73)	24 (74)
Average precipitation mm (inches)	98 (3.9)	82 (3.2)	96 (3.8)	71 (2.8)	104 (4.1)	129 (5.1)	101 (4.0)	94 (3.7)	99 (3.9)	135 (5.3)	174 (6.9)	143 (5.6)	1,326 (52.3)
Average rainy days	18.0	14.1	17.1	16.8	23.7	25.7	25.8	23.3	24.2	25.9	24.0	20.6	259.2
Source: Meteoblue

== Demographics ==
Population census of Getafe
Year	Pop.	±% p.a.
1903	10,447	—
1918	13,355	+1.65%
1939	16,670	+1.06%
1948	18,597	+1.22%
1960	19,715	+0.49%
1970	20,144	+0.22%
1975	23,563	+3.19%
1980	24,376	+0.68%
1990	26,225	+0.73%
1995	26,945	+0.51%
2000	31,028	+3.07%
2007	32,355	+0.58%
2010	27,788	−5.39%
2015	30,955	+2.08%
2020	33,422	+1.63%
2024	33,485	+0.05%
Source: Philippine Statistics Authority

== Economy ==
Poverty incidence of Getafe (%)

Source: Philippine Statistics Authority

== Education ==
Secondary and high schools
  - Campao Oriental National High School
  - Handumon National High School
  - Pandanon National High School
  - Santo Niño Institute
  - Tulang National High School
Elementary schools
  - Alumar Elementary School
  - Banacon Elementary School
  - Cabasakan Elementary School
  - Campao Elementary School
  - Cangmundo Elementary School
  - Corte Baud Elementary School
  - Getafe 1 Central Elementary School
  - Getafe 2 Central Elementary School
  - Handumon Elementary School
  - Jagoliao Elementary School
  - Jandayan Elementary School
  - Mahanay Elementary School
  - Nasingin Elementary School
  - Pandanon Elementary School
  - Saguise Elementary School
  - Salog Elementary School
  - San Jose Elementary School
  - Taytay Elementary School
  - Tugas Elementary School
Private schools
  - Advent Care Multigrade School
  - Galbreath International School

== Sister cities ==
- Getafe, Spain since 16 November 1990

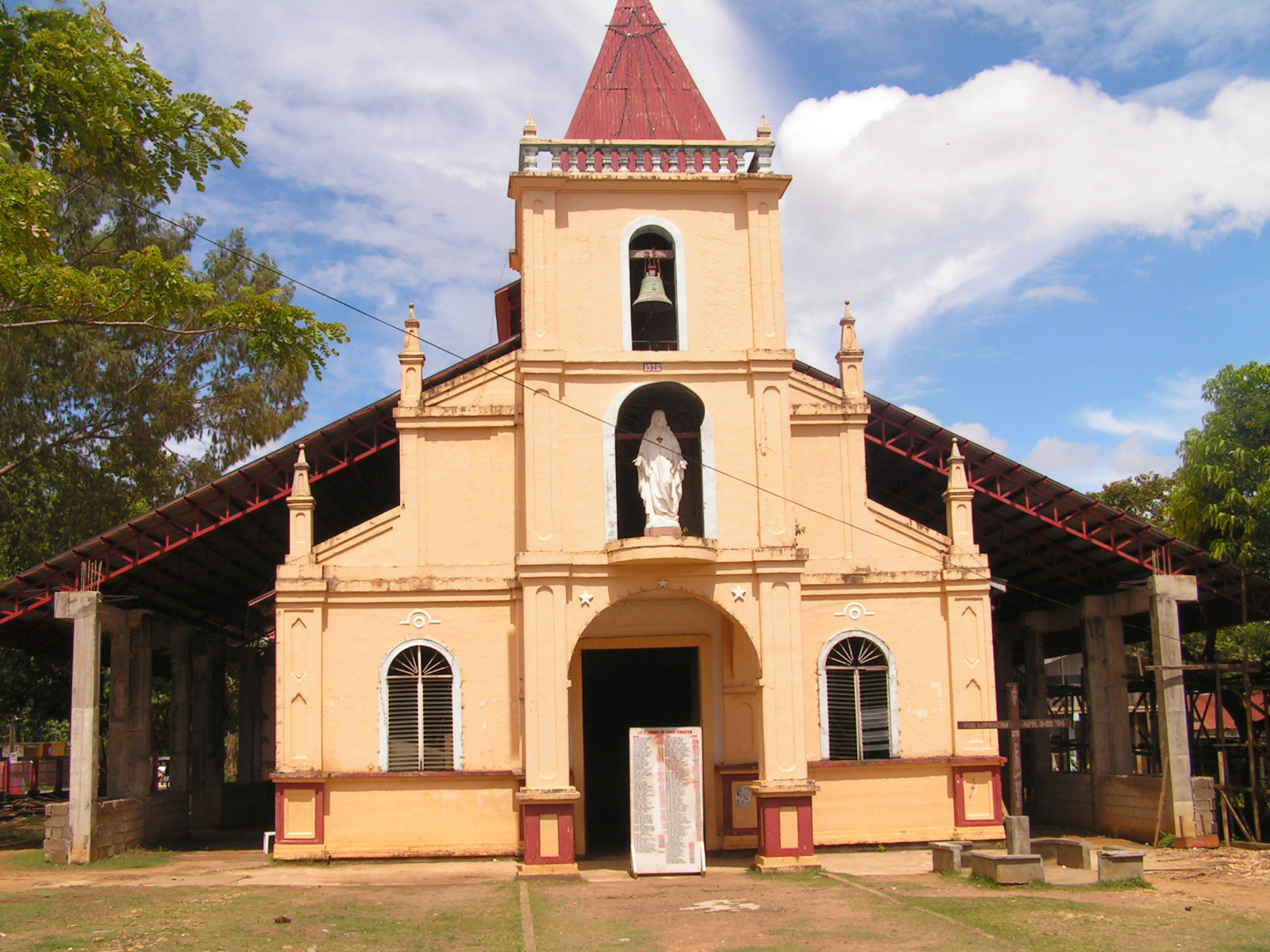
Roman Catholic Church, Getafe
