= Angilan =

Angilan may refer to:

- Angelan, Azerbaijan
- Angilan, a barangay in Antequera, Bohol, Philippines
- Angilan, a barangay in Duero, Bohol, Philippines
- Angilan, a barangay in Aloguinsan, Cebu, Philippines
- Angilan, a barangay in Omar, Sulu, Philippines
