= Mabini, Bohol =

Municipality in Bohol, Philippines

Mabini
- Municipality
- Municipality of Mabini
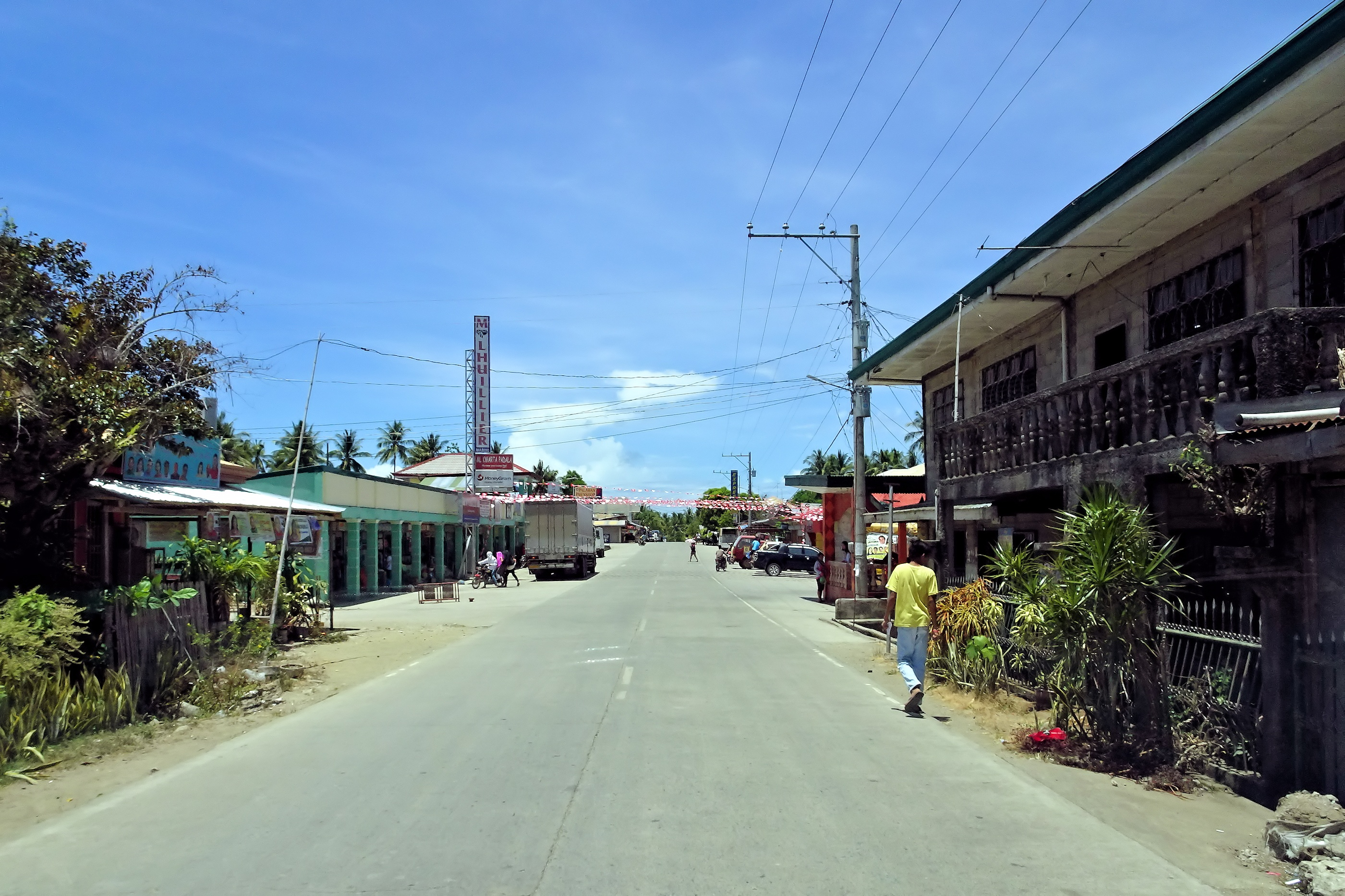
- Mabini, Bohol

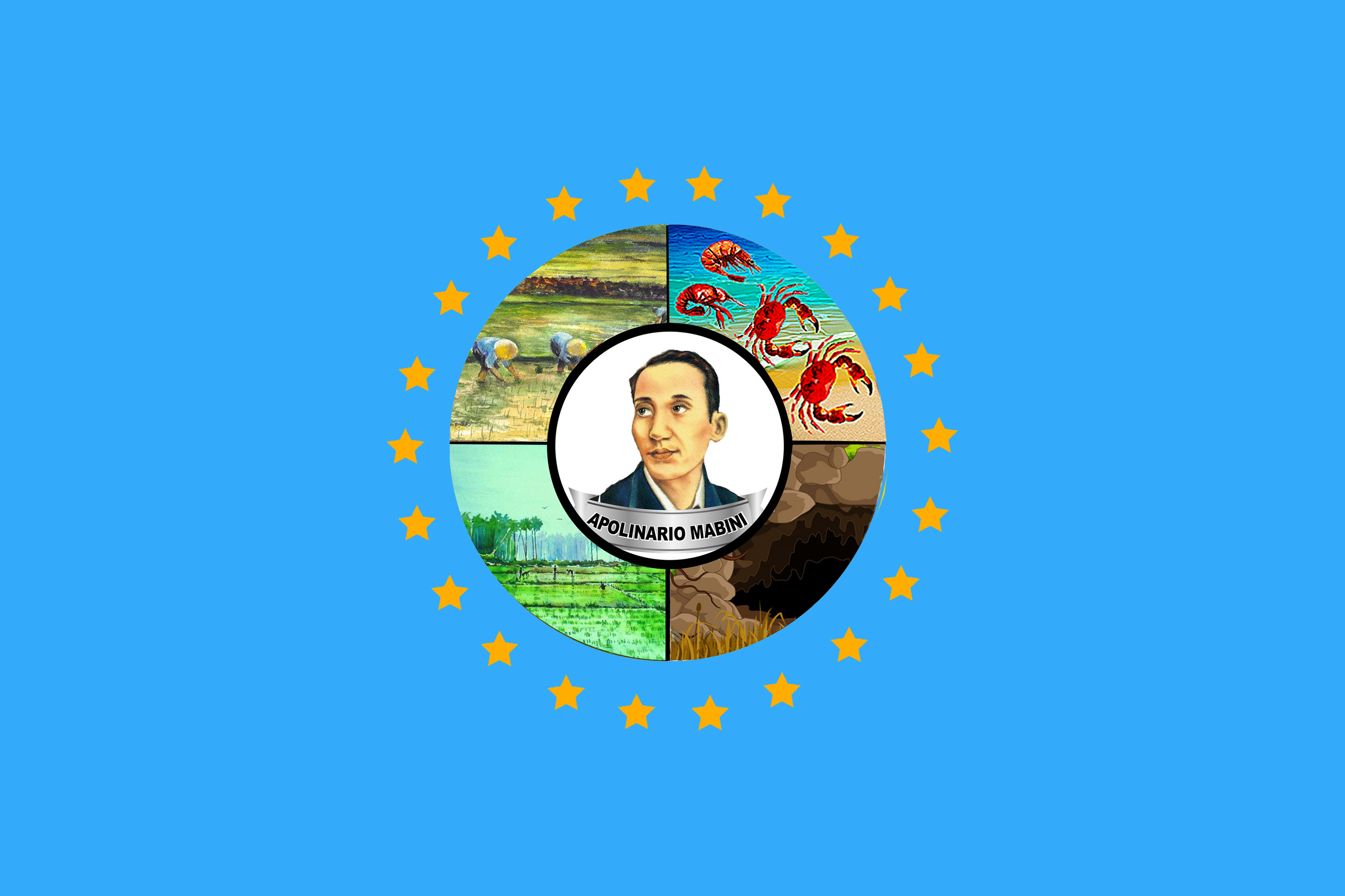
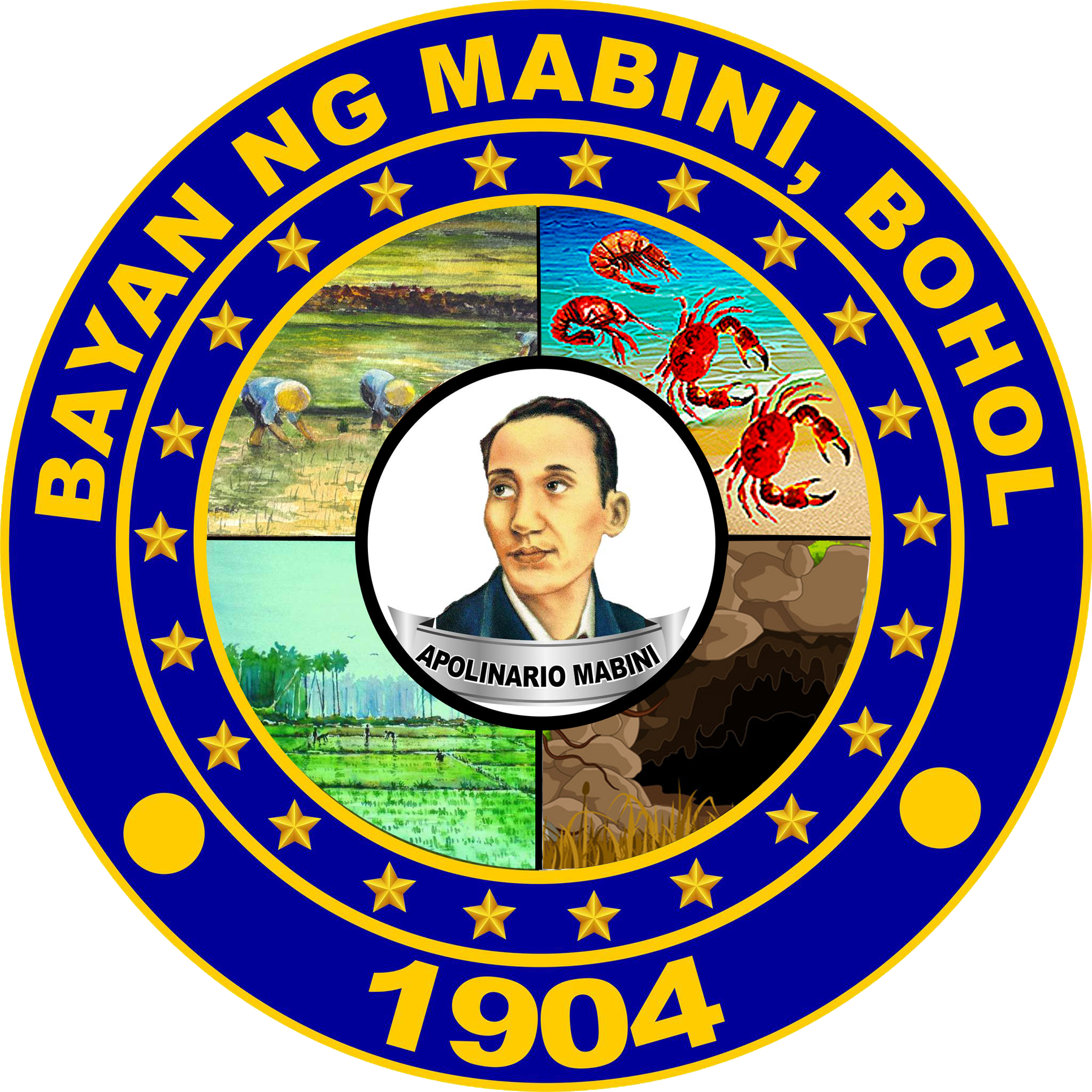
- Flag Seal

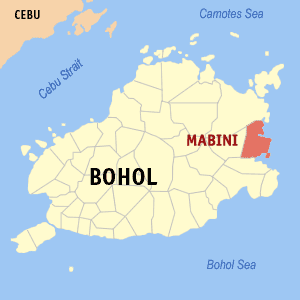
- Map of Bohol with Mabini highlighted
- Interactive map of Mabini
- Location within the Philippines
- Coordinates: 9°51′54″N 124°31′23″E
- Country: Philippines
- Region: Central Visayas
- Province: Bohol
- District: 3rd district
- Founded: 1904
- Named for: Apolinario Mabini
- Barangays: 22 (see Barangays)

Government
  - Type: Sangguniang Bayan
  - Mayor: Ongie Grace Bernales-Lim
  - Vice Mayor: Myra F. Colis
  - Representative: Kristine Alexie B. Tutor
  - Municipal Council: Members: Cherry Mae Bagabaldo; Ester E. Anchuelo; Victoriano D. Jotojot; Dona Mae Tutor; Levito Baldo; Jerson Curit; Nemrod Ybanez; Romeo Toong; Ricsteven G. Ayag
  - Electorate: 20,406 voters (2025)

Area
  - Total: 104.57 km^{2} (40.37 sq mi)
- Elevation: 12.9 m (42 ft)
- Highest elevation: 243 m (797 ft)
- Lowest elevation: 0 m (0 ft)

Population (2024 census)
  - Total: 28,224
  - Density: 269.91/km^{2} (699.05/sq mi)
  - Households: 6,917

Economy
  - Income class: 3rd municipal income class
  - Poverty incidence: 23.51% (2023)
  - Revenue: ₱ 157 million (2024)
  - Assets: ₱ 470.3 million (2024)
  - Expenditure: ₱ 108.4 million (2024)
  - Liabilities: ₱ 76.21 million (2024)

Service provider
  - Electricity: Bohol 2 Electric Cooperative (BOHECO 2)
- Time zone: UTC+8 (PST)
- ZIP code: 6313
- PSGC: 071231000
- IDD : area code: +63 (0)38
- Native languages: Boholano dialect Cebuano; Tagalog
- Website: www.mabinibohol.gov.ph

Mabini, officially the Municipality of Mabini (Cebuano: Munisipyo sa Mabini; Tagalog: Bayan ng Mabini), is a municipality in the province of Bohol, Philippines. According to the 2024 census, it has a population of 28,224 people.

Mabini celebrates its feast on May 4, to honor the town patron Santa Monica.

== History ==
Established on October 31, 1903 titled Philippine Commission Act No. 968, the town of Mabini was initially composed of the territory of Batuanan (now Alicia and Mabini), Barrio Libas from Candijay, and Barrio Cabulao from Ubay (now San Roque, Mabini). The efforts of establishing these barangays into a town came from Capitan Canuto Bernales, General Pedro Samson and Atty. Gabino Sepulveda when the Philippines Governor General issued a directive to organize large barangays into towns.

Bernales, Samson and Sepulveda were friends and comrades-in-arms during the Filipino-Spanish and Filipino-American revolutions. The idea of naming the town as Mabini came from Samson and Sepulveda, in honor of the hero, Apolinario Mabini, the Sublime Paralytic and Brain of the Revolution. Then provincial Governor Aniceto Clarin handed over the approved resolution to Capitan Bernales who had to walk all the way to Tagbilaran to receive it. The approved resolution he receive formally recognized the formation of the town of Mabini. Bernales became the first town president of Mabini.

On March 9, 2005, Mabini became the site of the Philippines' deadliest accidental mass poisoning, when 28 students died and more than 100 others were hospitalized after eating cassava-based snacks believed to have been tainted with pesticide in Barangay San Jose.

== Geography ==
=== Barangays ===
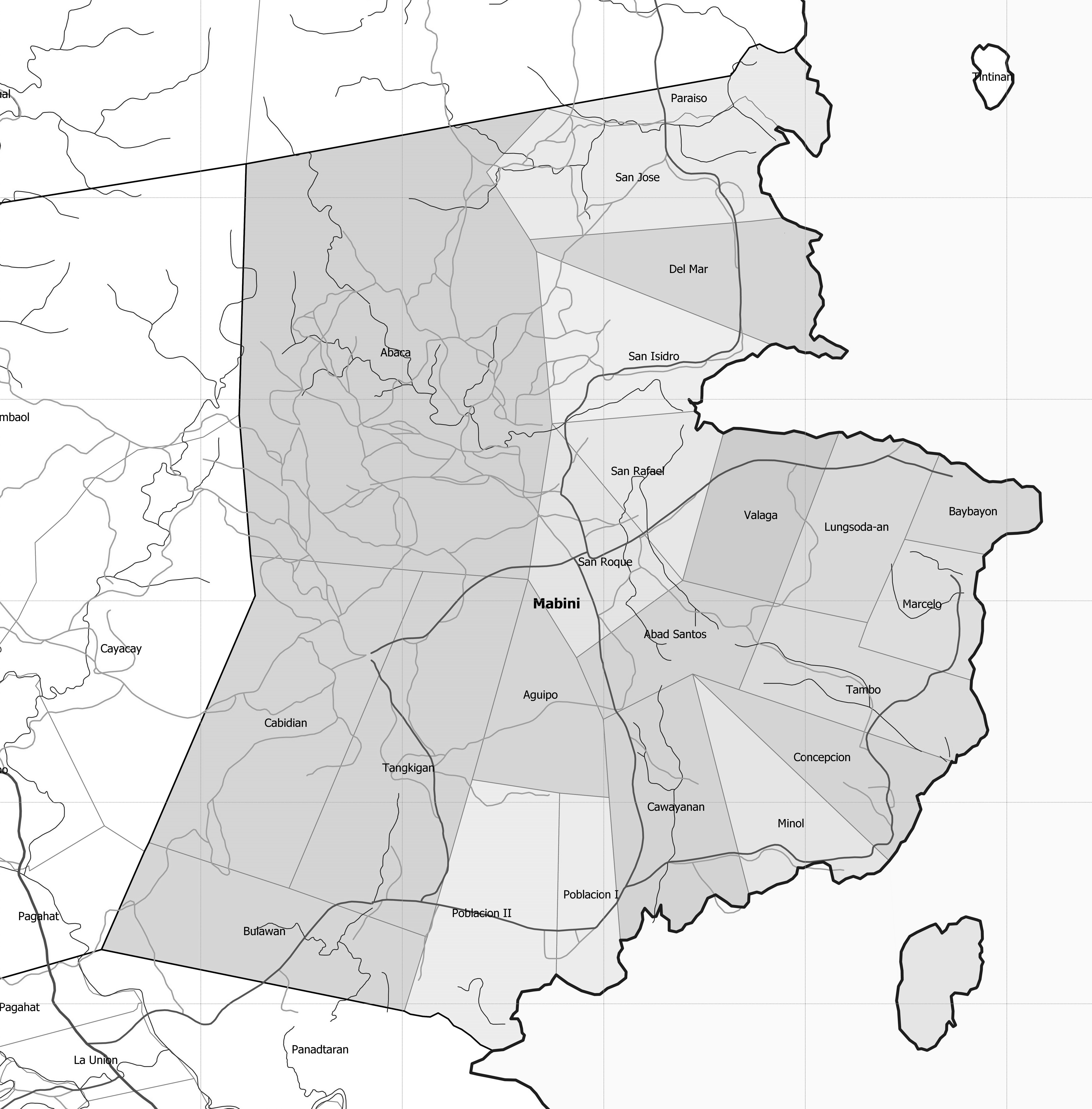
Map of Mabini showing barangays and islands

Mabini is politically subdivided into 22 barangays. Each barangay consists of puroks and some have sitios.

PSGC	Barangay	Population			±% p.a.	
		2024		2010		
071231001	Abaca	8.5%	2,413	2,349	▴	0.19%
071231002	Abad Santos	2.0%	567	720	▾	−1.65%
071231003	Aguipo	4.4%	1,231	1,368	▾	−0.73%
071231005	Baybayon	4.7%	1,314	1,508	▾	−0.95%
071231006	Bulawan	1.9%	533	658	▾	−1.45%
071231007	Cabidian	3.2%	903	1,040	▾	−0.98%
071231009	Cawayanan	5.6%	1,568	1,552	▴	0.07%
071231004	Concepcion (Banlas)	4.3%	1,215	1,259	▾	−0.25%
071231010	Del Mar	3.0%	833	759	▴	0.65%
071231011	Lungsoda‑an	3.8%	1,081	1,130	▾	−0.31%
071231012	Marcelo	3.3%	918	1,000	▾	−0.59%
071231013	Minol	5.0%	1,399	1,414	▾	−0.07%
071231014	Paraiso	2.9%	821	819	▴	0.02%
071231015	Poblacion I	5.0%	1,405	1,425	▾	−0.10%
071231016	Poblacion II	5.9%	1,675	1,697	▾	−0.09%
071231017	San Isidro	5.8%	1,638	1,633	▴	0.02%
071231018	San Jose	5.0%	1,403	1,427	▾	−0.12%
071231019	San Rafael	2.4%	683	736	▾	−0.52%
071231020	San Roque (Cabulao)	9.0%	2,548	2,529	▴	0.05%
071231021	Tambo	3.1%	874	914	▾	−0.31%
071231022	Tangkigan	4.8%	1,350	1,438	▾	−0.44%
071231023	Valaga	2.8%	799	799	Steady	0.00%
	Total		28,224	28,174	▴	0.01%

=== Climate ===
Climate data for Mabini, Bohol
Month	Jan	Feb	Mar	Apr	May	Jun	Jul	Aug	Sep	Oct	Nov	Dec	Year
Mean daily maximum °C (°F)	28 (82)	28 (82)	29 (84)	31 (88)	31 (88)	30 (86)	30 (86)	30 (86)	30 (86)	29 (84)	29 (84)	28 (82)	29 (85)
Mean daily minimum °C (°F)	23 (73)	23 (73)	23 (73)	23 (73)	24 (75)	24 (75)	24 (75)	24 (75)	24 (75)	24 (75)	24 (75)	23 (73)	24 (74)
Average precipitation mm (inches)	98 (3.9)	82 (3.2)	96 (3.8)	71 (2.8)	104 (4.1)	129 (5.1)	101 (4.0)	94 (3.7)	99 (3.9)	135 (5.3)	174 (6.9)	143 (5.6)	1,326 (52.3)
Average rainy days	18.0	14.1	17.1	16.8	23.7	25.7	25.8	23.3	24.2	25.9	24.0	20.6	259.2
Source: Meteoblue

== Demographics ==
Population census of Mabini
Year	Pop.	±% p.a.
1918	9,005	—
1939	17,473	+3.21%
1948	22,673	+2.94%
1960	14,703	−3.54%
1970	16,223	+0.99%
1975	19,071	+3.30%
1980	20,876	+1.82%
1990	21,854	+0.46%
1995	23,370	+1.26%
2000	27,250	+3.35%
2007	28,788	+0.76%
2010	28,174	−0.78%
2015	27,171	−0.69%
2020	28,701	+1.16%
2024	28,224	−0.40%
Source: Philippine Statistics Authority

== Economy ==
Poverty incidence of Mabini (%)

Source: Philippine Statistics Authority

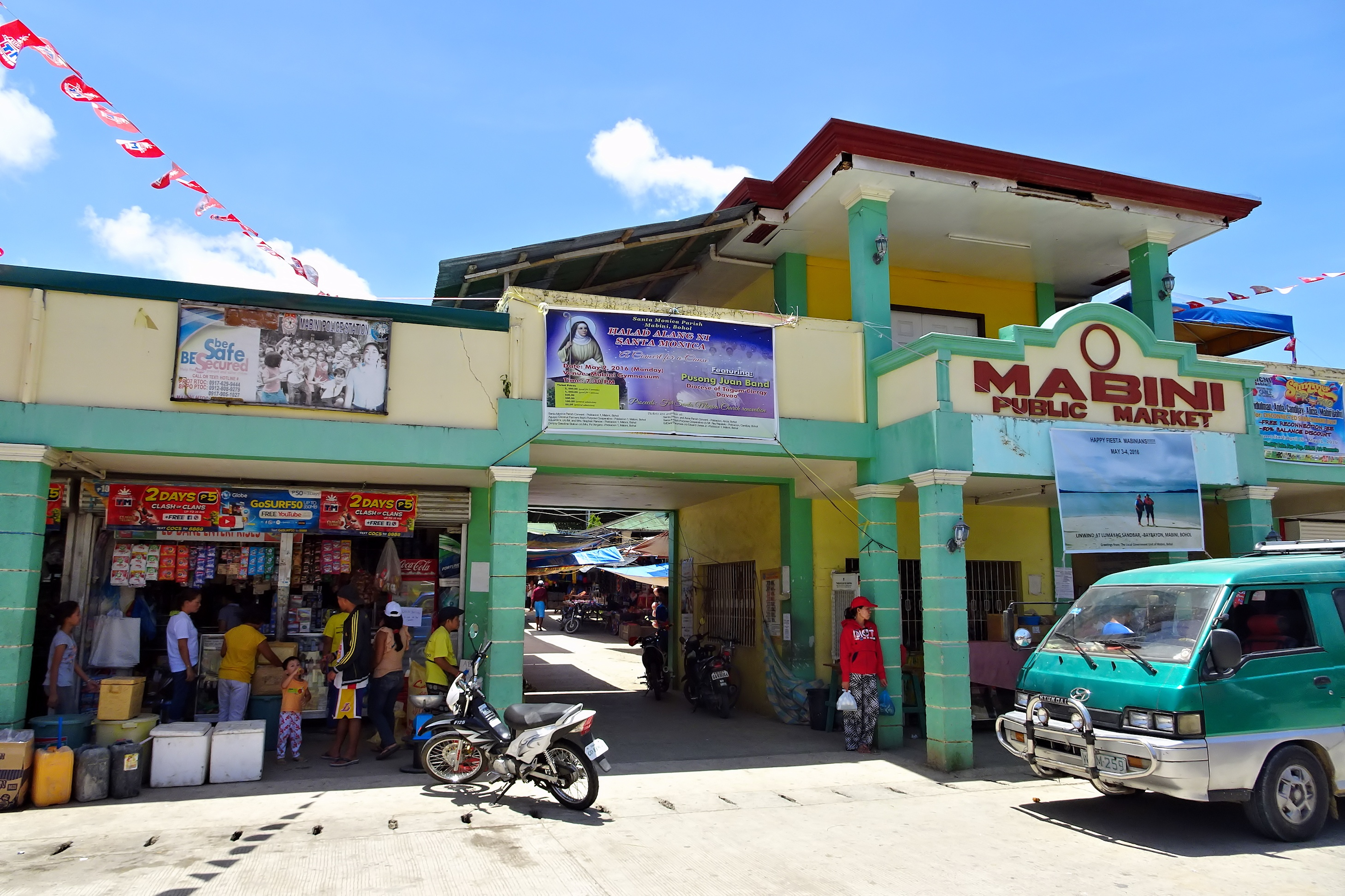
Mabini public market
