= Kars (disambiguation) =

Kars is a city in Turkey.

Kars may also refer to:

== Geography ==
- Kars Parish, New Brunswick, a civil parish in Kings County
  - Kars, New Brunswick, an unincorporated community in Kars Parish
- Kars, Ontario, a small village of the city in Ottawa, Ontario, Canada
- Kars/Rideau Valley Air Park a small airport near Kars, Ontario
- Kars Province, a province of Turkey
- Qars or Kars, a village in the Khizi Rayon of Azerbaijan

== History ==
- Kadirli, formerly Kars, a town and district of Osmaniye Province in the Mediterranean region of Turkey
- Kars Eyalet, Ottoman Empire
- Kars Oblast, Russian Empire
- Kars Republic

== Other uses ==
- Jean-Rodolphe Kars (born 1947), French pianist
- "Kars 1" and "Kars 2 (Wounds of the Centuries)," two songs by Armenian pianist Tigran Hamasyan from his 2015 album Mockroot.
- Kars dog, a breed of livestock guardian dog from eastern Turkey
- Kars, the primary antagonist from the manga JoJo's Bizarre Adventure: Battle Tendency

== See also ==
- Battle of Kars (disambiguation)
- Cars (disambiguation)
- Kar's Nuts, a United States manufacturer of nut and snack items
- KARS (disambiguation)
