= Alicia, Bohol =

Municipality in Bohol, Philippines

Alicia Batuanan
- Municipality
- Municipality of Alicia
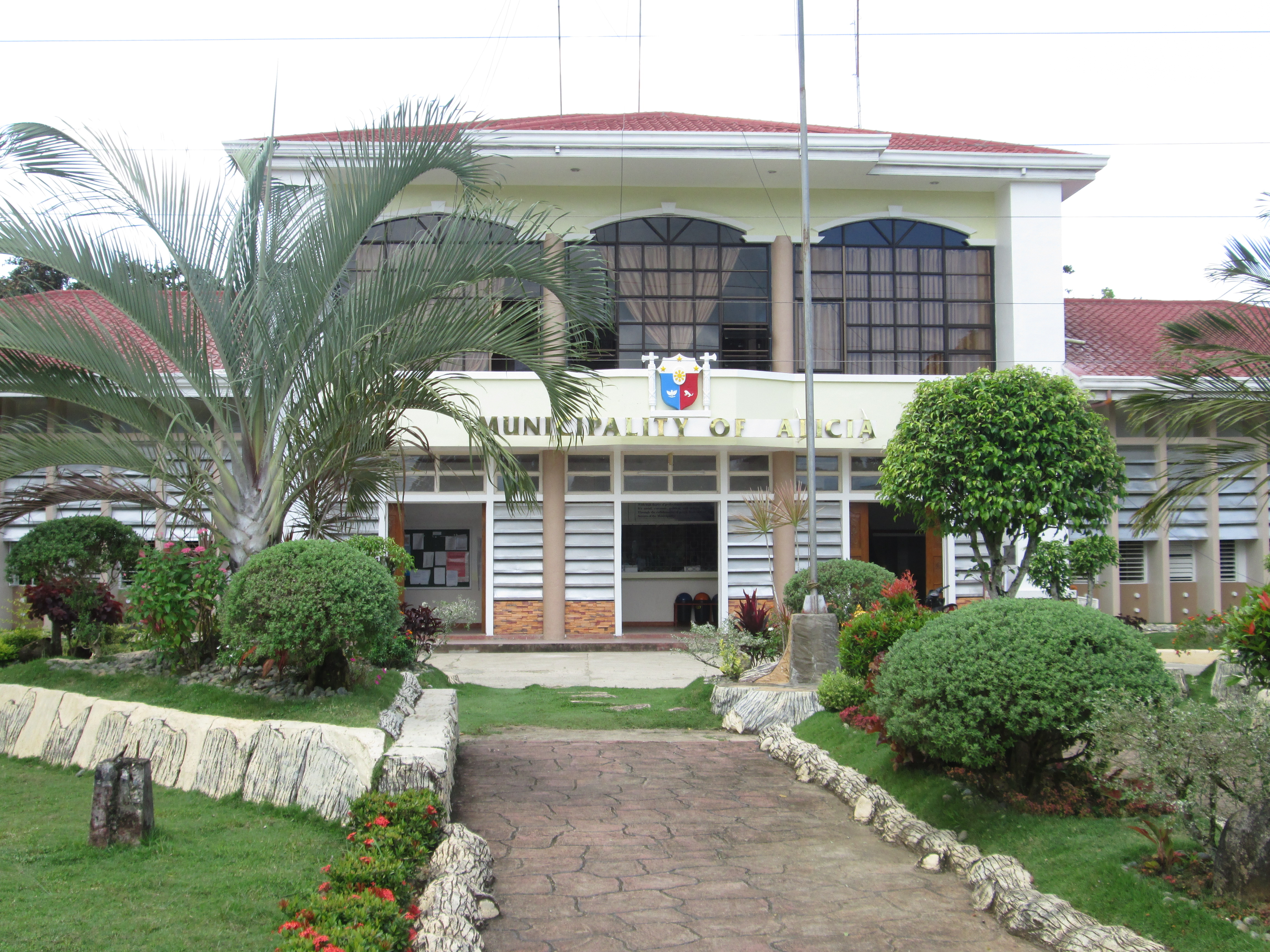
- Municipality Hall

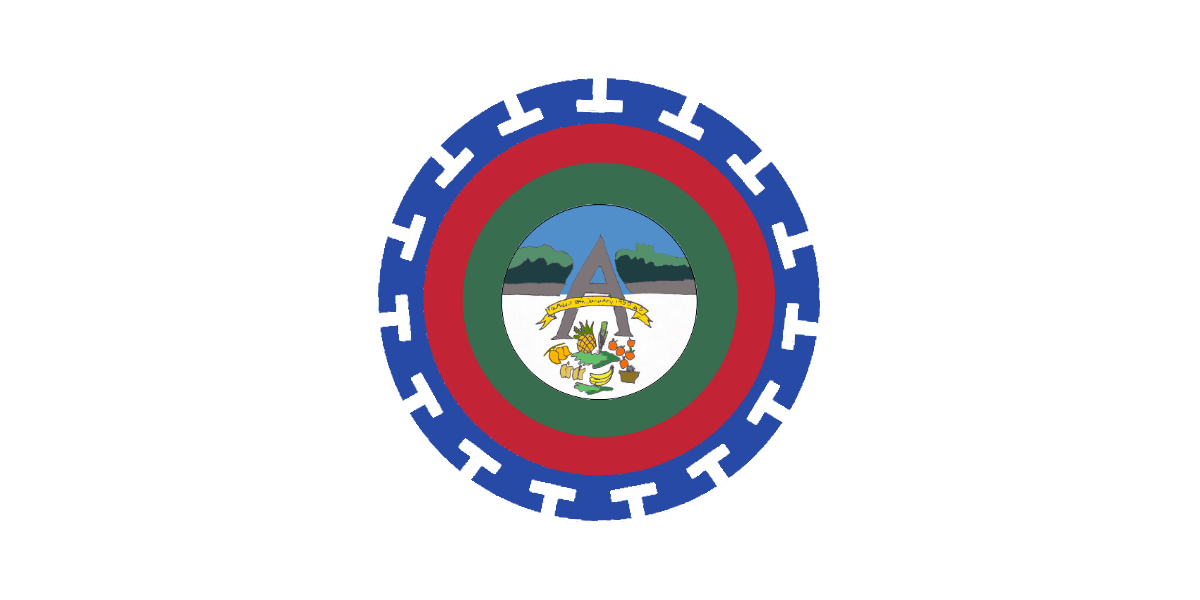
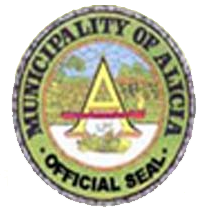
- Flag Seal

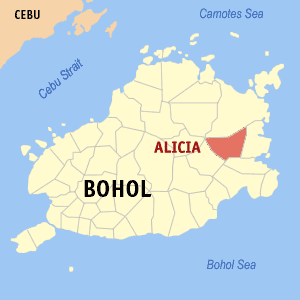
- Map of Bohol with Alicia highlighted
- Interactive map of Alicia
- Location within the Philippines
- Coordinates: 9°53′45″N 124°26′29″E
- Country: Philippines
- Region: Central Visayas
- Province: Bohol
- District: 3rd district
- Founded: 18 January 1950
- Named for: Alicia Syquia
- Barangays: 15 (see Barangays)

Government
  - Type: Sangguniang Bayan
  - Mayor: Marciano S. Ayuban, Jr.
  - Vice Mayor: Ruel E. Carias
  - Representative: Kristine Alexie B. Tutor
  - Municipal Council: Members: Fortunato C. Corciega; Reymond B. Galon; Alberto P. Hinampas; Juliet M. Bernales; Alger L. Balahay; Richard G. Perez; Felix A. Duetes; James A. Lambunao
  - Electorate: 18,056 voters (2025)

Area
  - Total: 114.50 km^{2} (44.21 sq mi)
- Elevation: 84 m (276 ft)
- Highest elevation: 400 m (1,300 ft)
- Lowest elevation: 3 m (9.8 ft)

Population (2024 census)
  - Total: 24,663
  - Density: 215.40/km^{2} (557.88/sq mi)
  - Households: 5,839

Economy
  - Income class: 3rd municipal income class
  - Poverty incidence: 20.53% (2023)
  - Revenue: ₱ 153 million (2024)
  - Assets: ₱ 377.1 million (2024)
  - Expenditure: ₱ 76.35 million (2024)
  - Liabilities: ₱ 53.34 million (2024)

Service provider
  - Electricity: Bohol 2 Electric Cooperative (BOHECO 2)
- Time zone: UTC+8 (PST)
- ZIP code: 6314
- PSGC: 071202000
- IDD : area code: +63 (0)38
- Native languages: Boholano dialect Cebuano; Tagalog
- Patron saint: Joachim
- Website: www.alicia-bohol.gov.ph

Alicia, officially the Municipality of Alicia (Cebuano: Munisipyo sa Alicia; Tagalog: Bayan ng Alicia), is a municipality in the province of Bohol, Philippines. According to the 2024 census, it has a population of 24,663 people.

Located 110 kilometres (68 mi) from Tagbilaran, it was formerly part of Mabini and was known as Batuanan (or Batuanon).

Alicia celebrates its town fiesta on 26 July in honor of Saint Joachim.

== History ==
In the mid-19th century Alicia was one of the three largest and oldest towns of Bohol along with Catigbian and Balilihan. The town was where former followers of Dagohoy were given some land to till, but at the same time could be kept under the watchful eye of Spanish authorities.

In 1829, the year the Dagohoy Rebellion ended, the town was the largest of five such settlements, with over 6000 inhabitants.

In 1949, it became an independent municipality, which was renamed Alicia after Alicia Syquia, the wife of president Elpidio Quirino. She and three of their children were massacred by the Japanese in 1945.

== Geography ==
=== Barangays ===
Alicia is politically subdivided into 15 barangays. Each barangay consists of puroks and some have sitios.

PSGC	Barangay	Population			±% p.a.	
		2024		2010		
071202001	Cabatang	3.5%	861	675	▴	1.70%
071202002	Cagongcagong	1.8%	440	423	▴	0.27%
071202003	Cambaol	4.9%	1,216	1,087	▴	0.78%
071202004	Cayacay	7.7%	1,897	1,713	▴	0.71%
071202005	Del Monte	3.4%	834	806	▴	0.24%
071202006	Katipunan	9.4%	2,317	2,230	▴	0.27%
071202007	La Hacienda	15.2%	3,758	3,710	▴	0.09%
071202008	Mahayag	2.8%	681	687	▾	−0.06%
071202009	Napo	5.3%	1,295	1,255	▴	0.22%
071202010	Pagahat	3.0%	747	586	▴	1.70%
071202011	Poblacion (Calingganay)	17.1%	4,214	4,064	▴	0.25%
071202012	Progreso	4.2%	1,031	1,019	▴	0.08%
071202013	Putlongcam	6.9%	1,698	1,578	▴	0.51%
071202014	Sudlon (Omhon)	2.7%	656	648	▴	0.09%
071202015	Untaga	7.6%	1,872	1,804	▴	0.26%
	Total		24,663	22,285	▴	0.71%

=== Climate ===
Climate data for Alicia, Bohol
Month	Jan	Feb	Mar	Apr	May	Jun	Jul	Aug	Sep	Oct	Nov	Dec	Year
Mean daily maximum °C (°F)	28 (82)	28 (82)	29 (84)	31 (88)	31 (88)	30 (86)	30 (86)	30 (86)	30 (86)	29 (84)	29 (84)	28 (82)	29 (85)
Mean daily minimum °C (°F)	23 (73)	23 (73)	23 (73)	23 (73)	24 (75)	24 (75)	24 (75)	24 (75)	24 (75)	24 (75)	24 (75)	23 (73)	24 (74)
Average precipitation mm (inches)	98 (3.9)	82 (3.2)	96 (3.8)	71 (2.8)	104 (4.1)	129 (5.1)	101 (4.0)	94 (3.7)	99 (3.9)	135 (5.3)	174 (6.9)	143 (5.6)	1,326 (52.3)
Average rainy days	18.0	14.1	17.1	16.8	23.7	25.7	25.8	23.3	24.2	25.9	24.0	20.6	259.2
Source: Meteoblue

== Demographics ==
Population census of Alicia
Year	Pop.	±% p.a.
1960	11,860	—
1970	12,717	+0.70%
1975	14,770	+3.05%
1980	15,766	+1.31%
1990	18,653	+1.70%
1995	19,402	+0.74%
2000	21,605	+2.33%
2007	23,422	+1.12%
2010	22,285	−1.79%
2015	23,517	+1.03%
2020	24,374	+0.76%
2024	24,663	+0.28%
Source: Philippine Statistics Authority

== Economy ==
Poverty incidence of Alicia (%)

Source: Philippine Statistics Authority

== Education ==
- Katipunan Elementary School, in Katipunan, Alicia, Bohol, Philippines. The Alicia Bamboo Ensemble or the Alicia's Musika Kawayan therein is a school-based orchestra, which has received the National Champion Prize (1994, 1996, and 2000) in the National Musical Competition for Young Artists (NAMCYA).

== Government ==
=== List of former chief executives ===
List of former mayors of Alicia:

- Pedro Huiso (1950–1955)
- Exequiel Madriñan
- Leoncio Garcia (1956–1959)
- Jesus Madriñan (1960–1980)
- Dominador Molina (1980–1987)
- Exequiel Madriñan Jr (1988–1995)
- Basilio Balahay (1995–2001)
- Bienvenido Molina (2001–2007)
- Pedro Miasco (2007–2010)
- Marnilou Ayuban (2010–2022)
- Victoriano C. Torres III (2023–2025)

== Gallery ==
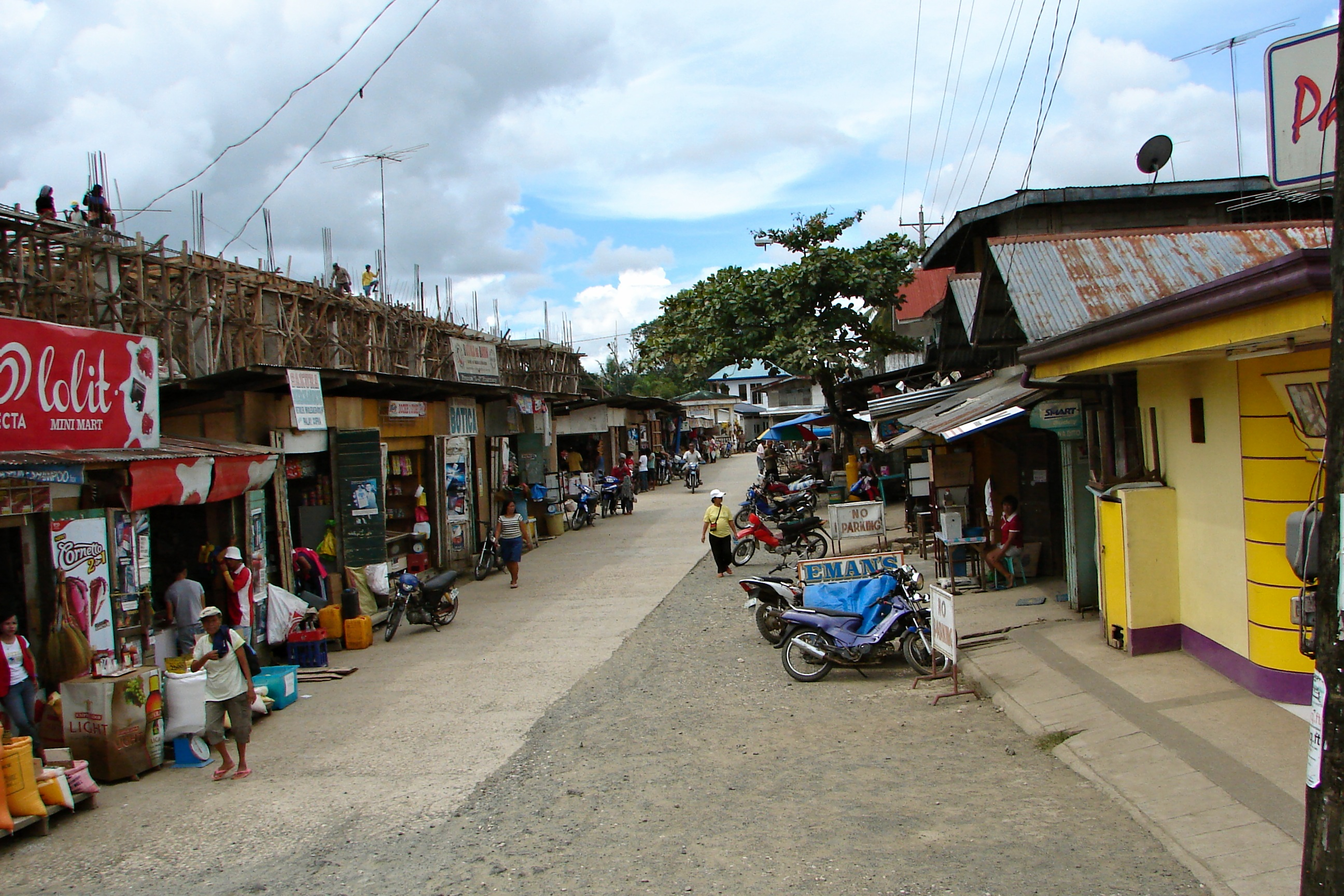
Poblacion and public market

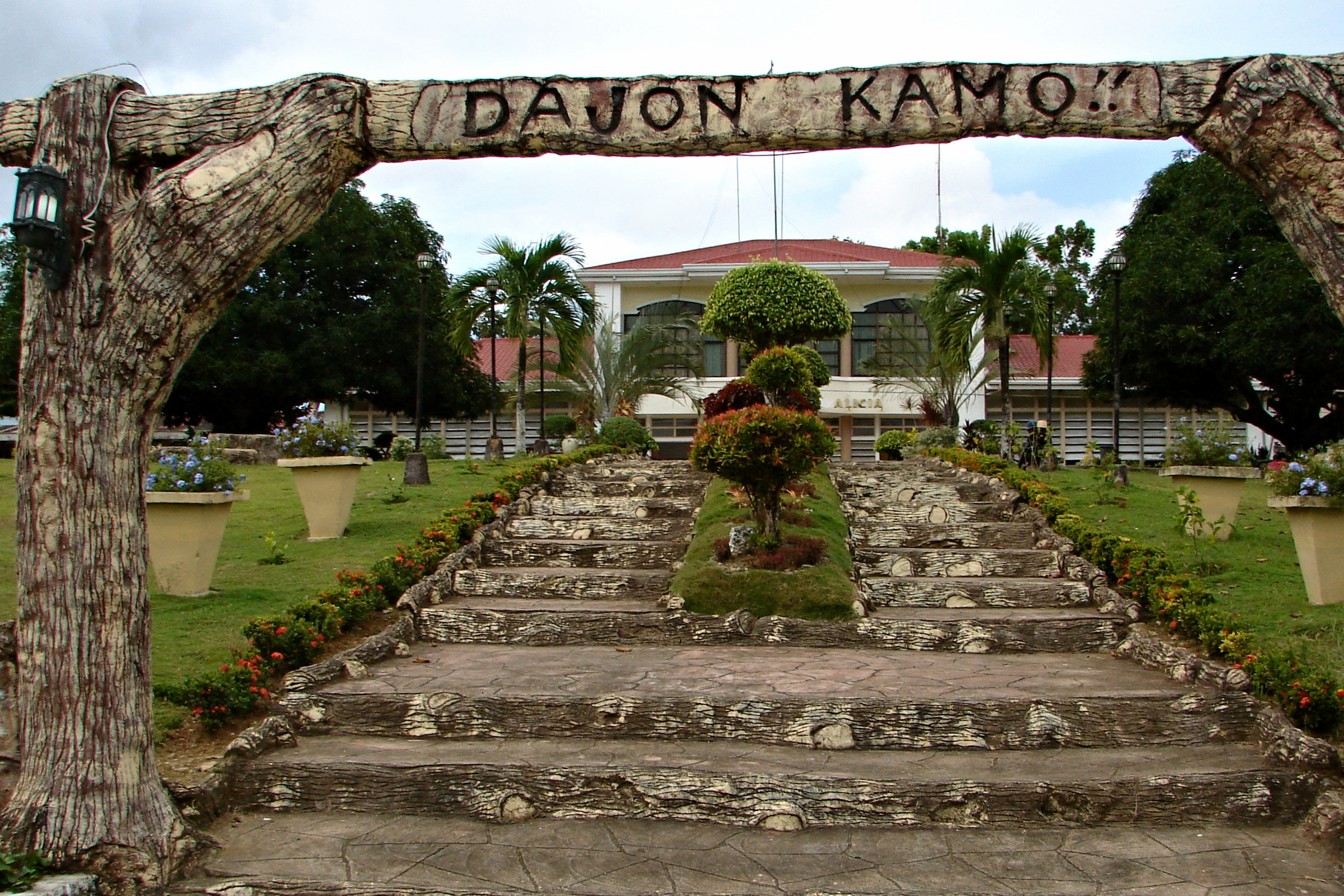
Plaza and town hall

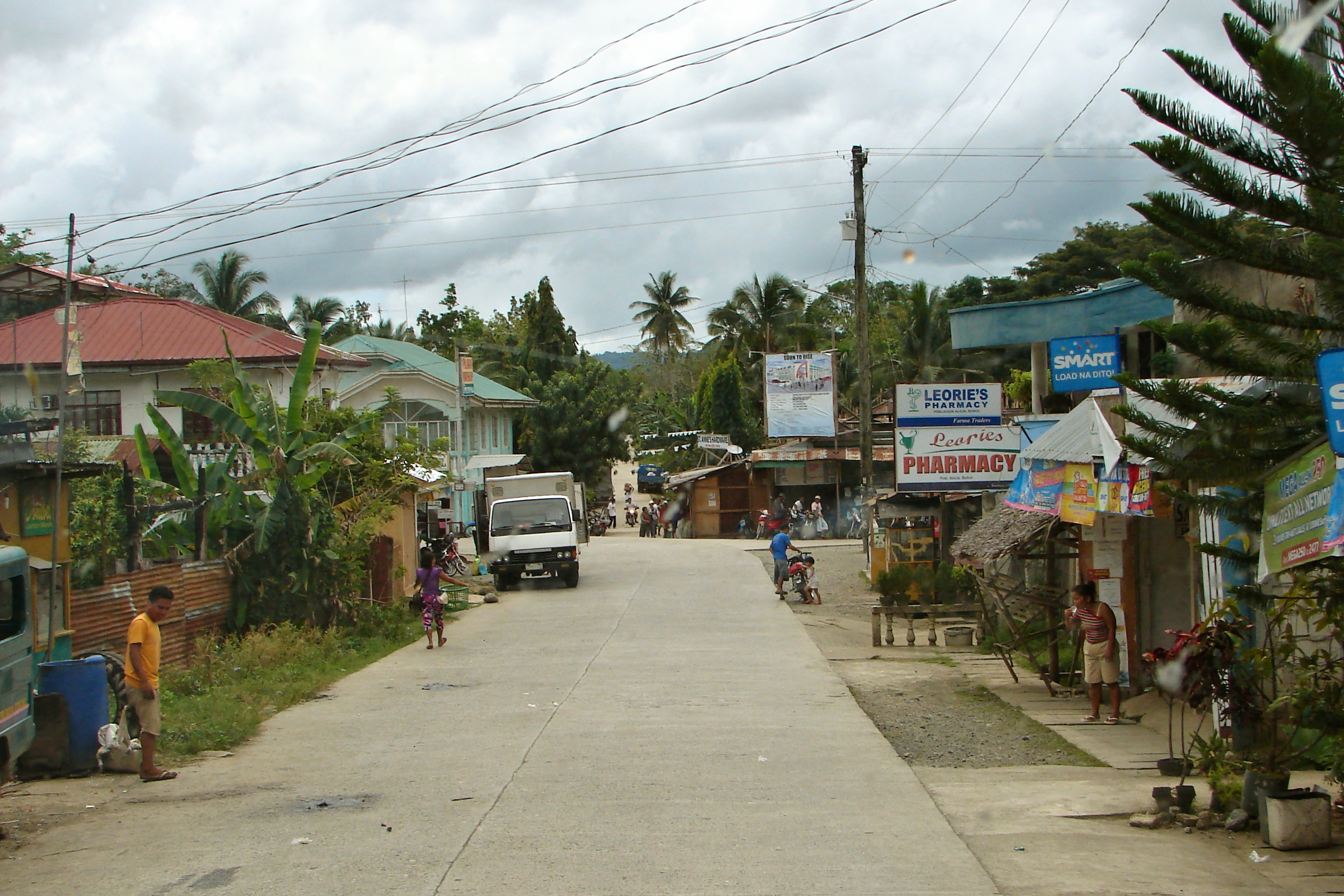
Residential street in Alicia

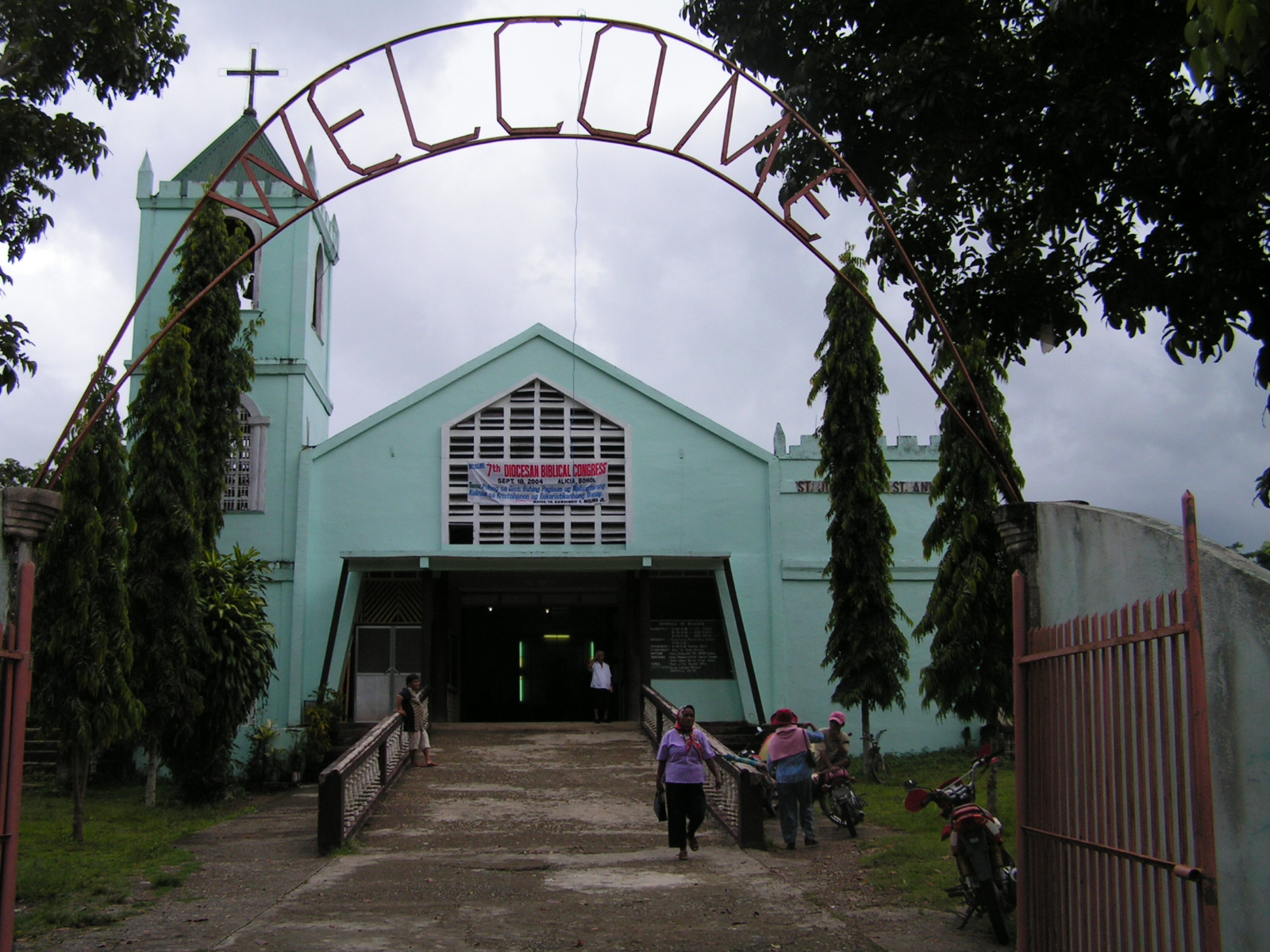
Church
