= Angelan =

Əngəlan, Əngilan
- village
- Location within Azerbaijan
- Coordinates: 40°49′28″N 49°02′11″E
- Country: Azerbaijan
- Rayon: Khizi
- Municipality: Tıxlı
- Time zone: UTC+4 (AZT)
  - Summer (DST): UTC+5 (AZT)

Əngəlan (also Əngilan, Angelan, Angalan or Ангилан) is a village in the Khizi Rayon or Azerbaijan. The village forms part of the municipality of Tıxlı.

Before the breakup of the Soviet Union, it was a village in Khizi Selsoviet under jurisdiction of the city of Sumqayit of Azerbaijan SSR, 5 kilometers (3.1 mi) from Khizi, the administrative center of the selsoviet. Two smaller villages: Ashaga Angelan ("Lower Angelan") and Yukhary Angelan ("Upper Angelan) appeared.
