= Garcia Hernandez =

Municipality in Bohol, Philippines

- Municipality
- Municipality of Garcia Hernandez
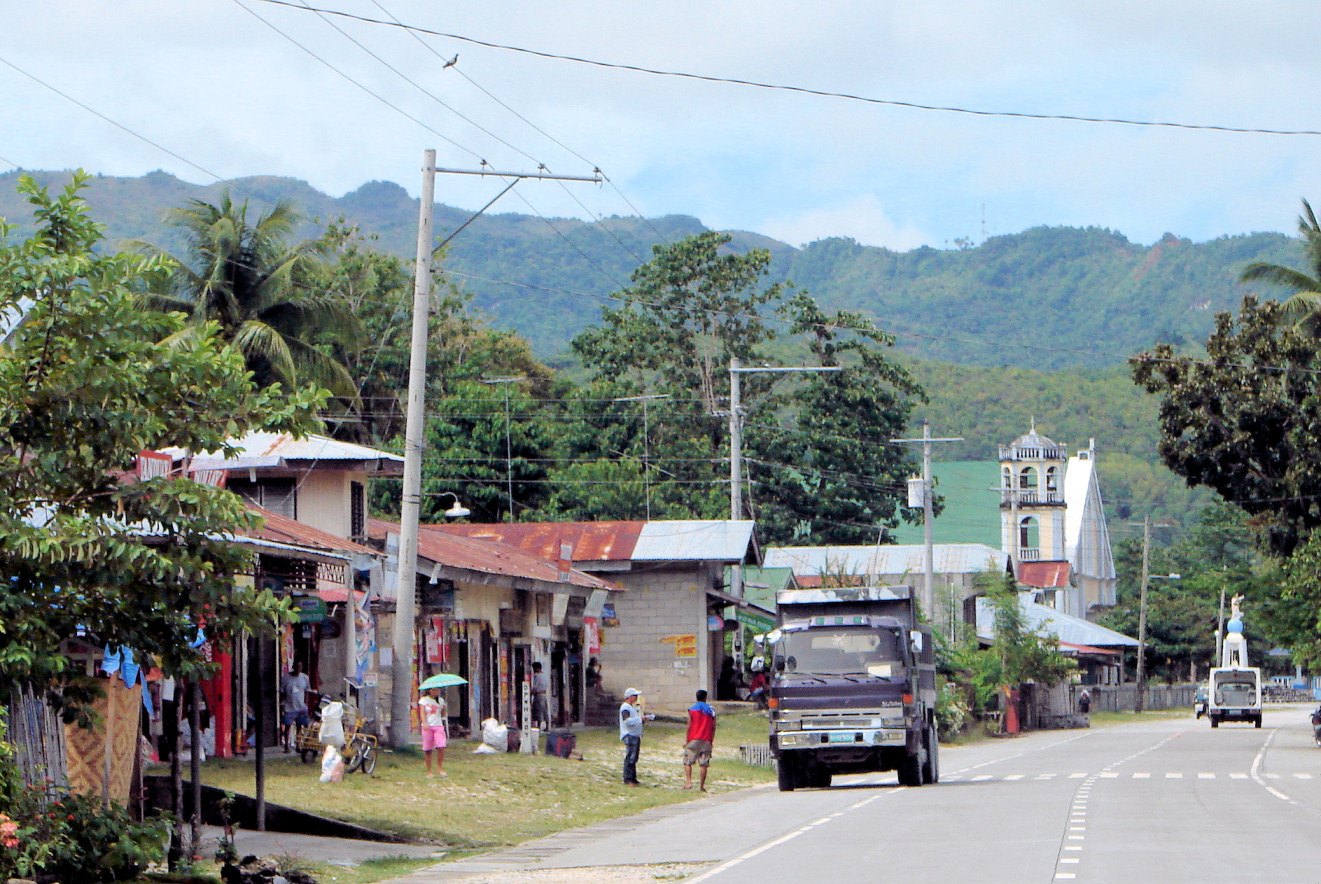
- Garcia Hernandez – public market

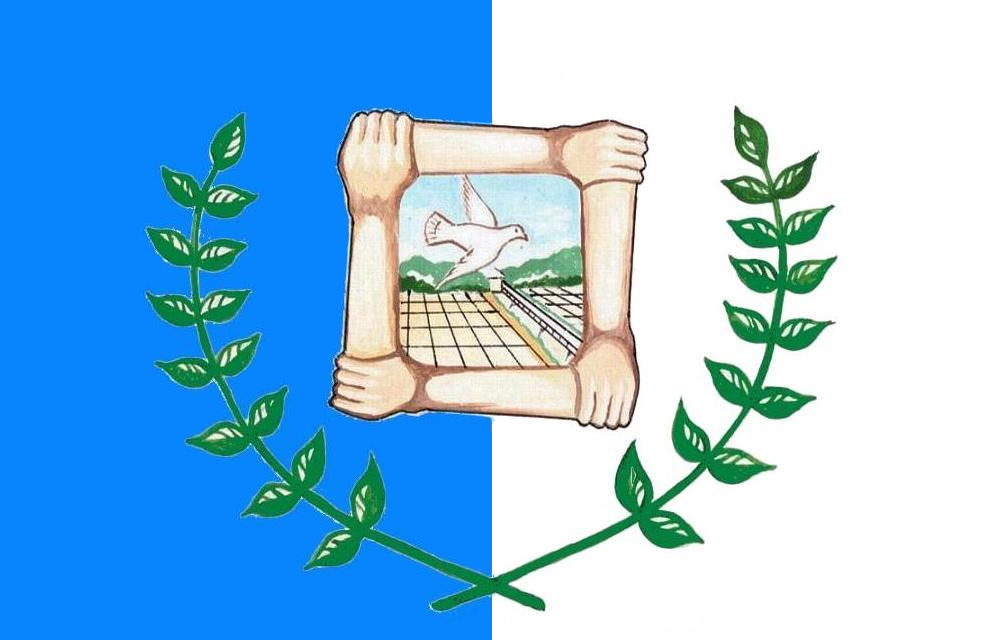
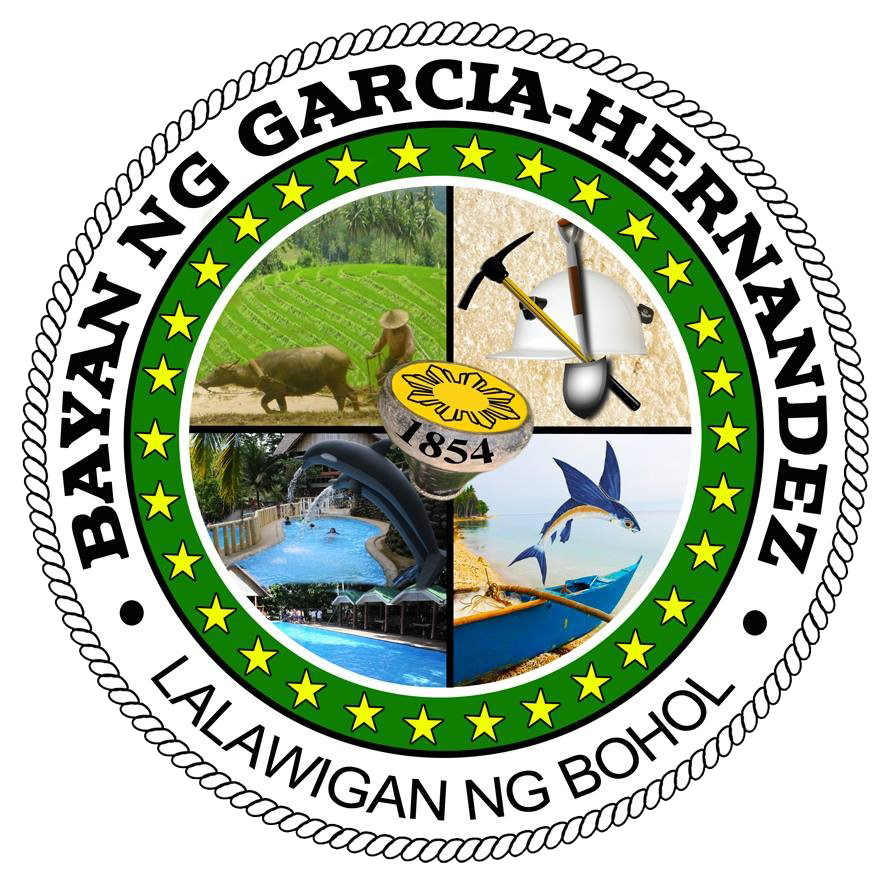
- Flag Seal

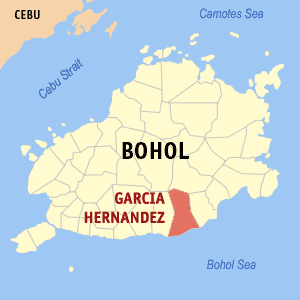
- Map of Bohol with Garcia Hernandez highlighted
- Interactive map of Garcia Hernandez
- Location within the Philippines
- Coordinates: 9°36′52″N 124°17′41″E
- Country: Philippines
- Region: Central Visayas
- Province: Bohol
- District: 3rd district
- Founded: May 27, 1854
- Named for: Victor Garcia; Narciso Hernandez
- Barangays: 30 (see Barangays)

Government
  - Type: Sangguniang Bayan
  - Mayor: Filadelfo Jess V. Baja III
  - Vice Mayor: Antonia J. Ladaga
  - Representative: Kristine Alexie B. Tutor
  - Municipal Council: Members: An P. Baja; Edgar B. Galbizo; Carol Tejano-Tentativa; Lito O. Dajalos; Editha I. Virador; Nilo G. Salise; Antonio V. Baja; Aldrich Kent I. Ladesma; NB COMELEC
  - Electorate: 17,183 voters (2025)

Area
  - Total: 127.50 km^{2} (49.23 sq mi)
- Elevation: 2.0 m (6.6 ft)

Population (2024 census)
  - Total: 24,450
  - Density: 191.8/km^{2} (496.7/sq mi)
  - Households: 5,448

Economy
  - Income class: 3rd municipal income class
  - Poverty incidence: 19.97% (2023)
  - Revenue: ₱ 169.2 million (2024)
  - Assets: ₱ 598.4 million (2024)
  - Expenditure: ₱ 56.97 million (2024)
  - Liabilities: ₱ 77.08 million (2024)

Service provider
  - Electricity: Bohol 2 Electric Cooperative (BOHECO 2)
- Time zone: UTC+8 (PST)
- ZIP code: 6307
- PSGC: 071222000
- IDD : area code: +63 (0)38
- Native languages: Boholano dialect Cebuano; Tagalog
- Website: garciahernandez.gov.ph

Garcia Hernandez, officially the Municipality of Garcia Hernandez (Cebuano: Munisipalidad sa Garcia Hernandez; Tagalog: Bayan ng Garcia Hernandez), is a municipality in the province of Bohol, Philippines. According to the 2024 census, it has a population of 24,450 people.

Garcia Hernandez is 57 kilometres (35 mi) from Tagbilaran.

It was declared an independent municipality on May 27, 1854, from Jagna by the Spanish Superior Government in Manila, through its representative Voraledez. It was Voraledez who renamed this town from its old name Sinugbuan to what it is presently known today, as an expression of gratitude to Fathers Victor Garcia and Narciso Hernandez, then Parish Priests of the towns of Loay and Guindulman, respectively. These two Spanish Friars were instrumental in the realization of the residents desire to be independent from Jagna.

The town is home to the sacred burial cave of Kalagan.

== Geography ==
=== Barangays ===
Garcia Hernandez is politically subdivided into 30 barangays. Each barangay consists of puroks and some have sitios.

PSGC	Barangay	Population			±% p.a.		Area		PD 2024	
		2024		2010			ha	acre	/km^{2}	/sq mi
071222001	Abijilan	5.8%	1,411	1,479	▾	−0.33%	820	2,026	170	450
071222002	Antipolo	2.5%	613	627	▾	−0.16%	522	1,290	120	300
071222003	Basiao	2.2%	532	514	▴	0.24%	236	583	230	580
071222004	Cagwang	1.4%	351	340	▴	0.22%	532	1,315	66	170
071222005	Calma	3.1%	759	752	▴	0.06%	126	311	600	1,600
071222006	Cambuyo	2.6%	638	614	▴	0.27%	642	1,586	99	260
071222007	Canayaon East	3.8%	925	931	▾	−0.04%	211	521	440	1,100
071222008	Canayaon West	3.9%	965	945	▴	0.15%	194	479	500	1,300
071222009	Candanas	3.1%	765	771	▾	−0.05%	735	1,816	100	270
071222010	Candulao	1.9%	459	422	▴	0.59%	132	326	350	900
071222011	Catmon	1.1%	277	220	▴	1.61%	240	593	120	300
071222012	Cayam	4.7%	1,140	1,194	▾	−0.32%	541	1,337	210	550
071222013	Cupa	0.9%	218	212	▴	0.19%	245	605	89	230
071222014	Datag	5.2%	1,268	1,184	▴	0.48%	1,289	3,185	98	250
071222015	Estaca	0.8%	203	194	▴	0.32%	194	479	100	270
071222016	Libertad	1.8%	436	421	▴	0.24%	380	939	110	300
071222017	Lungsodaan East	4.6%	1,114	1,098	▴	0.10%	718	1,774	160	400
071222018	Lungsodaan West	4.5%	1,105	997	▴	0.72%	637	1,574	170	450
071222019	Malinao	5.5%	1,338	1,046	▴	1.73%	634	1,567	210	550
071222020	Manaba	7.0%	1,723	1,679	▴	0.18%	296	731	580	1,500
071222021	Pasong	4.5%	1,101	918	▴	1.27%	684	1,690	160	420
071222022	Poblacion East	5.6%	1,370	1,328	▴	0.22%	439	1,085	310	810
071222023	Poblacion West	3.7%	906	961	▾	−0.41%	422	1,043	210	560
071222024	Sacaon	2.6%	629	614	▴	0.17%	253	625	250	640
071222025	Sampong	1.0%	243	241	▴	0.06%	524	1,295	46	120
071222026	Tabuan	5.4%	1,318	1,277	▴	0.22%	750	1,853	180	460
071222027	Togbongon	1.3%	324	367	▾	−0.86%	388	959	84	220
071222028	Ulbujan East	2.8%	690	673	▴	0.17%	419	1,035	160	430
071222029	Ulbujan West	3.4%	831	745	▴	0.76%	426	1,053	200	510
071222030	Victoria	1.1%	272	274	▾	−0.05%	118	292	230	600
	Total		24,450	23,038	▴	0.41%	12,750	31,506	190	14

=== Climate ===
Climate data for Garcia Hernandez, Bohol
Month	Jan	Feb	Mar	Apr	May	Jun	Jul	Aug	Sep	Oct	Nov	Dec	Year
Mean daily maximum °C (°F)	28 (82)	29 (84)	30 (86)	31 (88)	31 (88)	30 (86)	30 (86)	30 (86)	30 (86)	29 (84)	29 (84)	29 (84)	30 (85)
Mean daily minimum °C (°F)	23 (73)	22 (72)	23 (73)	23 (73)	24 (75)	25 (77)	24 (75)	24 (75)	24 (75)	24 (75)	23 (73)	23 (73)	24 (74)
Average precipitation mm (inches)	102 (4.0)	85 (3.3)	91 (3.6)	75 (3.0)	110 (4.3)	141 (5.6)	121 (4.8)	107 (4.2)	111 (4.4)	144 (5.7)	169 (6.7)	139 (5.5)	1,395 (55.1)
Average rainy days	18.6	14.8	16.5	16.7	23.9	26.4	25.6	24.1	24.4	26.3	23.7	20.5	261.5
Source: Meteoblue

== Demographics ==
Population census of Garcia Hernandez
Year	Pop.	±% p.a.
1903	6,060	—
1918	8,555	+2.33%
1939	11,486	+1.41%
1948	13,690	+1.97%
1960	12,828	−0.54%
1970	13,604	+0.59%
1975	16,701	+4.20%
1980	16,715	+0.02%
1990	18,956	+1.27%
1995	21,323	+2.23%
2000	21,428	+0.11%
2007	21,308	−0.08%
2010	23,038	+2.88%
2015	24,194	+0.94%
2020	24,430	+0.20%
2024	24,450	+0.02%
Source: Philippine Statistics Authority

== Economy ==
Poverty incidence of Garcia Hernandez (%)

Source: Philippine Statistics Authority

== Parishes ==
- Saint John the Baptist
- Saint Isidore the Farmer

== Gallery ==
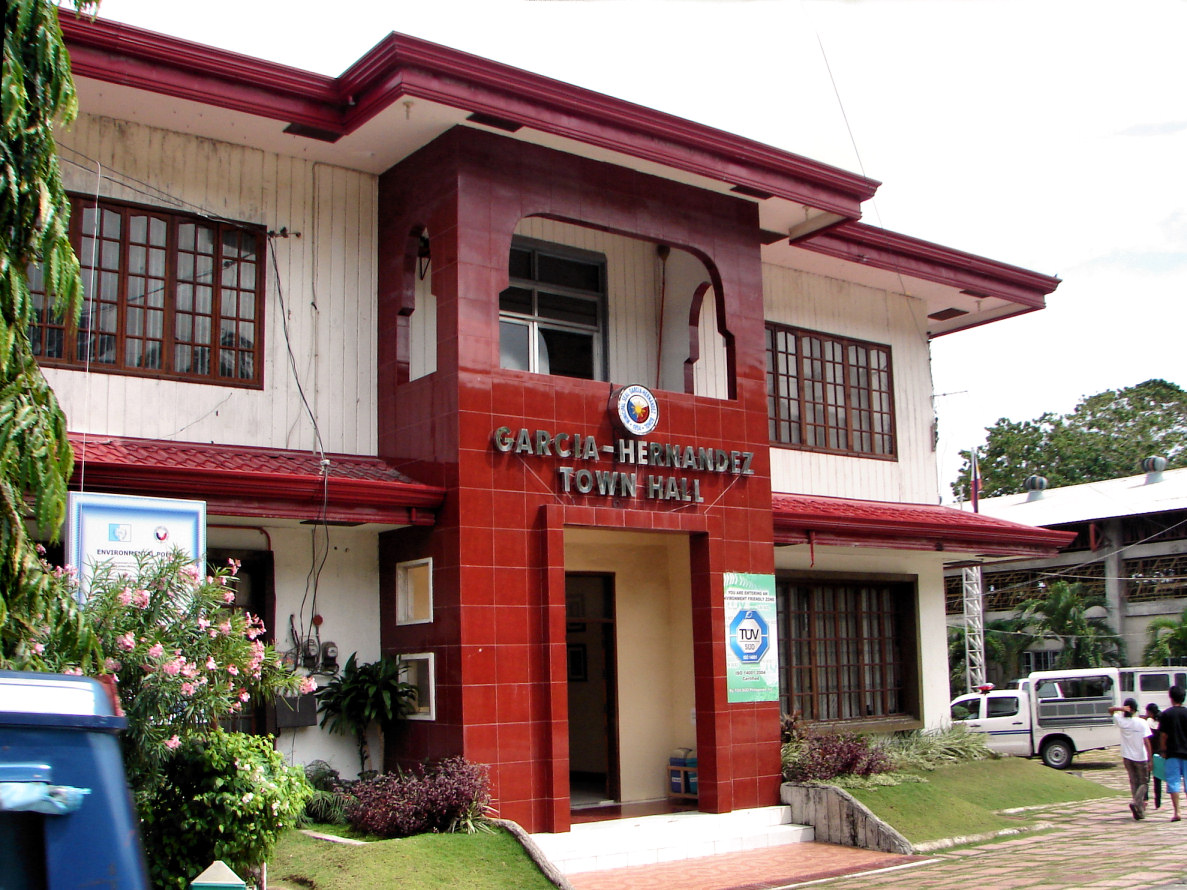
Municipal hall

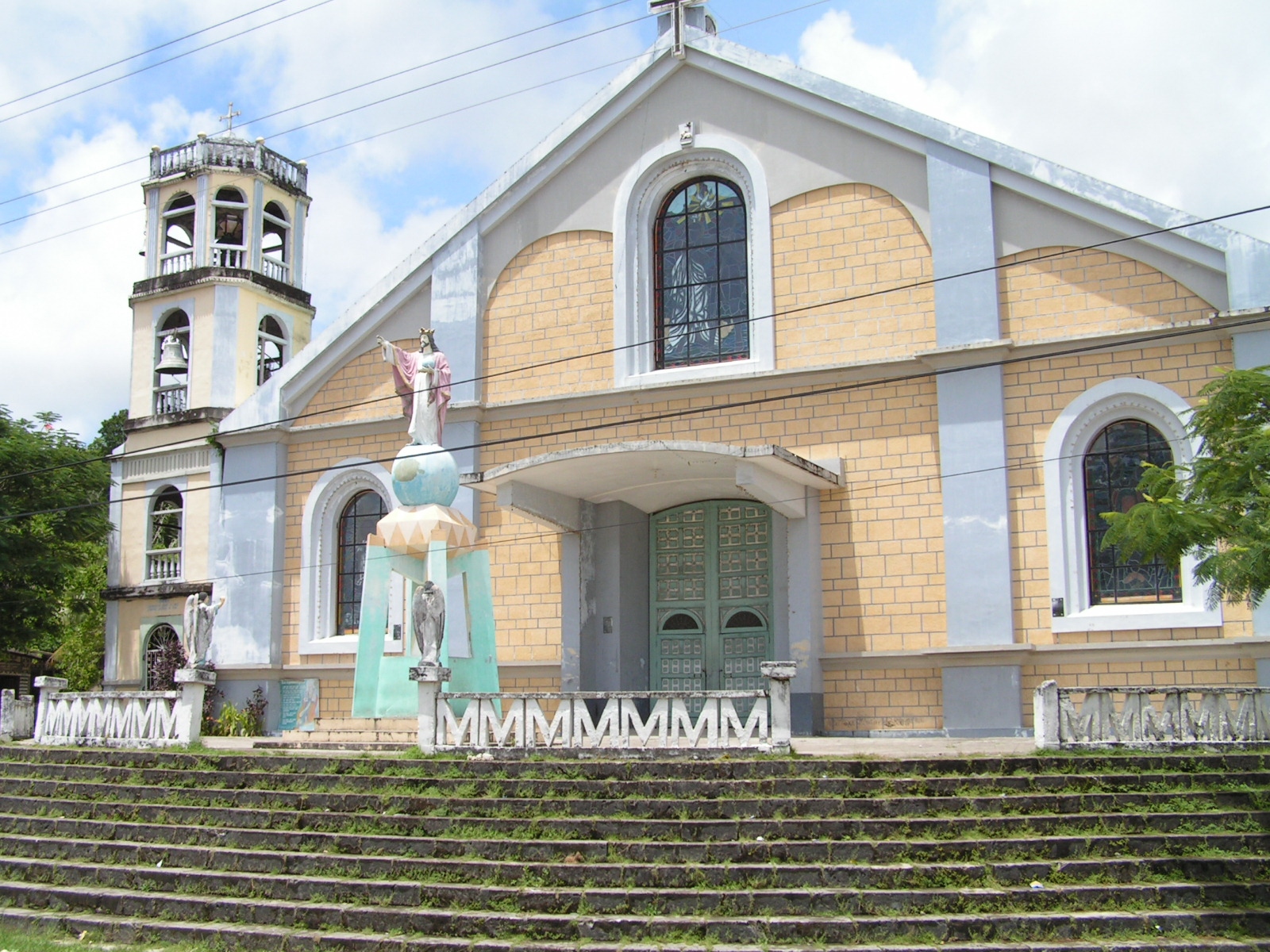
Roman Catholic Church
