= Battle of Kars (disambiguation) =

The Battle of Kars may also refer to:

- Siege of Kars (1206–1207)
- Battle of Kars (1548), part of the Ottoman–Safavid War (1532–1555)
- Siege of Kars (1744), part of the Ottoman–Persian War (1743–1746)
- Battle of Kars (1745), part of the Ottoman–Persian War (1743–1746)
- Siege of Kars (1828), part of the Russo-Turkish War (1828–1829)
- Siege of Kars, part of the Crimean War
- Battle of Kars, part of the Russo-Turkish War (1877–1878)
- Battle of Kars (1920), part of the Turkish–Armenian War

== See also ==
- Kars (disambiguation)
