= Duero, Bohol =

Municipality in Bohol, Philippines

Duero
- Municipality
- Municipality of Duero
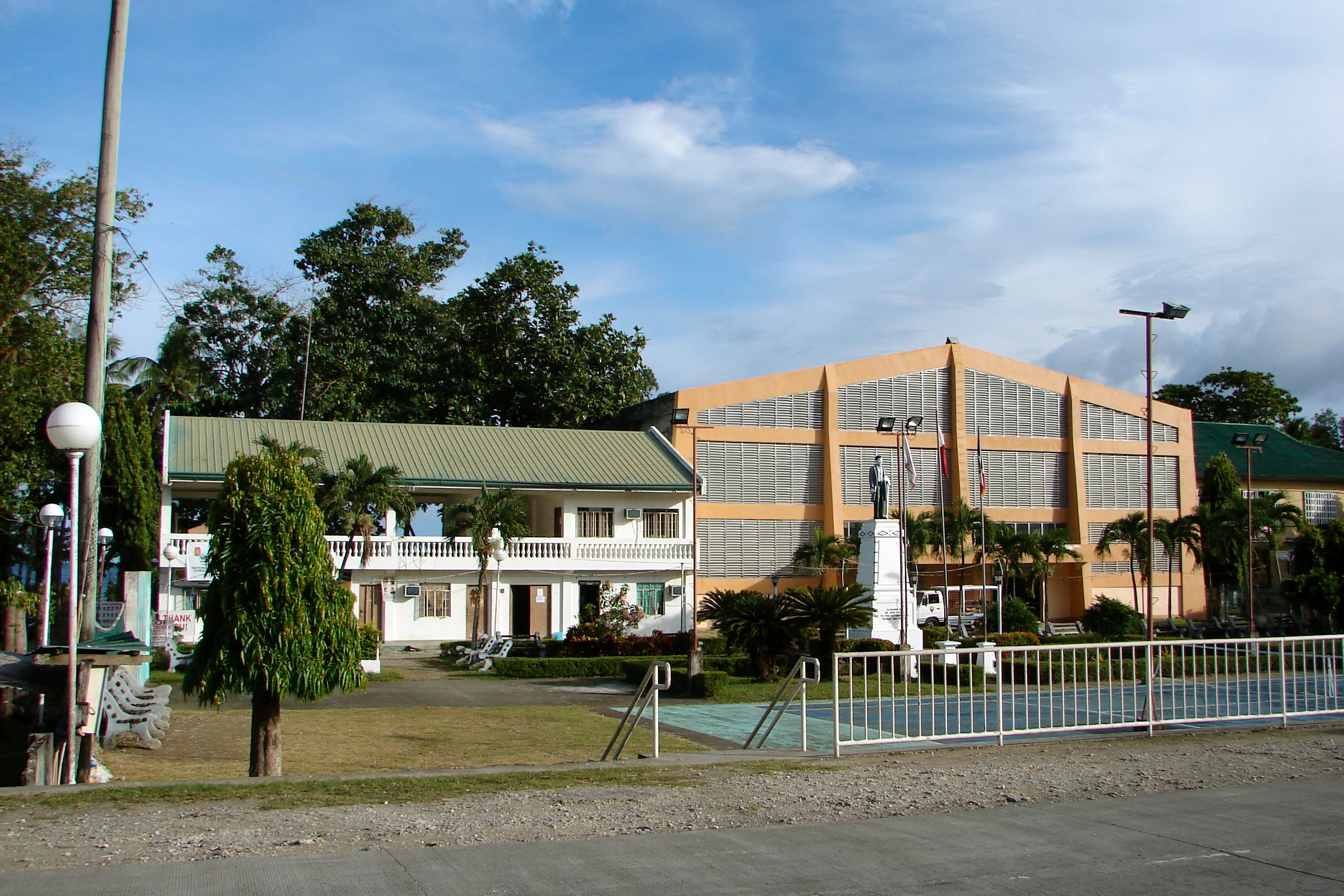
- Duero

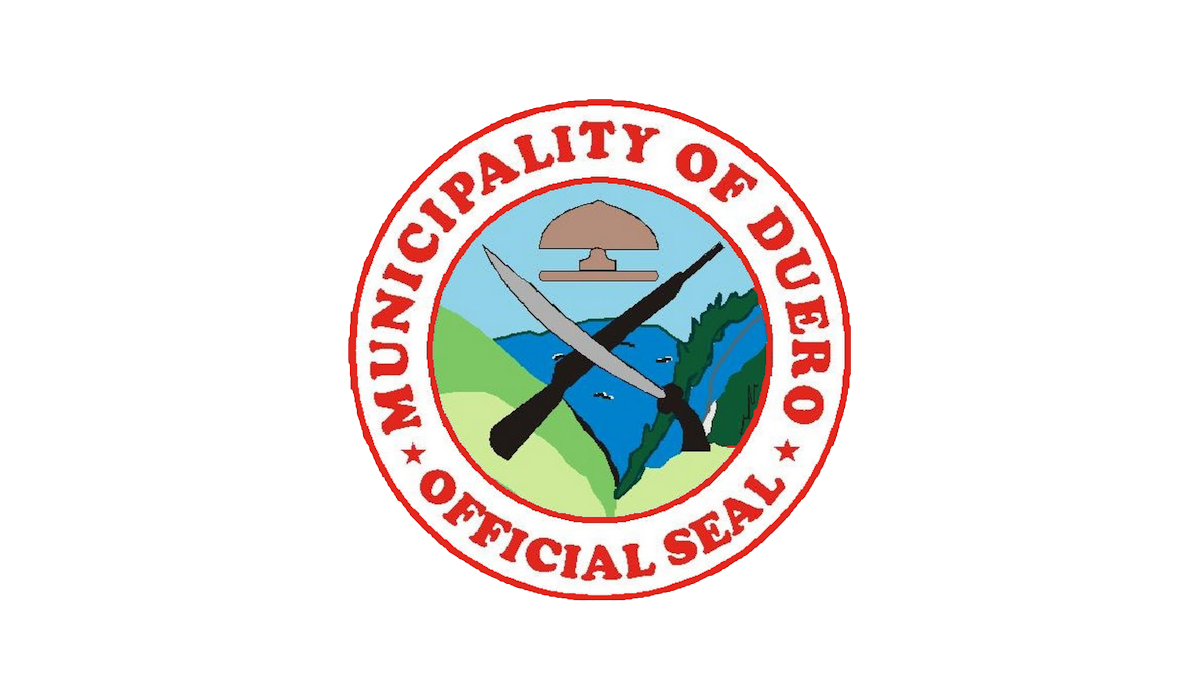
- Flag

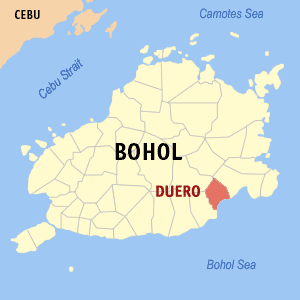
- Map of Bohol with Duero highlighted
- Interactive map of Duero
- Location within the Philippines
- Coordinates: 9°43′N 124°24′E
- Country: Philippines
- Region: Central Visayas
- Province: Bohol
- District: 3rd district
- Founded: 1862
- Barangays: 21 (see Barangays)

Government
  - Type: Sangguniang Bayan
  - Mayor: Al Cadorniga Taculad
  - Vice Mayor: Hernes Alupit Bajao
  - Representative: Kristine Alexie B. Tutor
  - Municipal Council: Members: Soli Balasabas De Asis; Ma Rowena Cadorna Sajonia; Zenass Penales Salazar; Jennifer Castrudes Taculad; Conrada Castino Amparo; Gillian Ranga Achacoso; Lourdes Anino Dancel; Christopher Asilo Salaan; NB COMELEC
  - Electorate: 14,421 voters (2025)

Area
  - Total: 97.30 km^{2} (37.57 sq mi)
- Elevation: 152 m (499 ft)
- Highest elevation: 789 m (2,589 ft)
- Lowest elevation: 0 m (0 ft)

Population (2024 census)
  - Total: 19,136
  - Density: 196.7/km^{2} (509.4/sq mi)
  - Households: 4,517

Economy
  - Income class: 4th municipal income class
  - Poverty incidence: 17.58% (2023)
  - Revenue: ₱ 125.4 million (2024)
  - Assets: ₱ 468.8 million (2024)
  - Expenditure: ₱ 50.43 million (2024)
  - Liabilities: ₱ 152.9 million (2024)

Service provider
  - Electricity: Bohol 2 Electric Cooperative (BOHECO 2)
- Time zone: UTC+8 (PST)
- ZIP code: 6309
- PSGC: 071221000
- IDD : area code: +63 (0)38
- Native languages: Boholano dialect Cebuano; Eskayan; Tagalog
- Website: duerobohol.gov.ph

Duero, officially the Municipality of Duero (Cebuano: Munisipyo sa Duero; Tagalog: Bayan ng Duero), is a municipality in the province of Bohol, Philippines. According to the 2024 census, it has a population of 19,136 people.

Duero is 77 kilometres (48 mi) from Tagbilaran.

Duero celebrates its fiesta on December 8, to honor the town patron Immaculate Conception.

== History ==
The town’s name may have been derived from the Douro (Duero) river in the Iberian Peninsula. Roman Catholicism was introduced to the area in 1860 by a Spanish priest. Duero was formally established as a municipality in 1862, and a convent was later constructed in 1868.

== Geography ==
=== Barangays ===
Duero politically subdivided into 21 barangays. Each barangay consists of puroks and some have sitios.

PSGC	Barangay	Population			±% p.a.	
		2024		2010		
071221001	Alejawan	4.0%	773	801	▾	−0.25%
071221002	Angilan	2.7%	514	540	▾	−0.34%
071221003	Anibongan	2.5%	479	540	▾	−0.83%
071221004	Bangwalog	7.1%	1,358	1,340	▴	0.09%
071221005	Cansuhay	4.1%	789	735	▴	0.49%
071221006	Danao	3.4%	646	688	▾	−0.44%
071221007	Duay	2.5%	482	390	▴	1.48%
071221008	Guinsularan	8.8%	1,689	1,736	▾	−0.19%
071221020	Imelda	3.2%	603	615	▾	−0.14%
071221009	Itum	5.9%	1,135	1,139	▾	−0.02%
071221010	Langkis	7.0%	1,338	1,002	▴	2.03%
071221011	Lobogon	5.8%	1,103	1,329	▾	−1.29%
071221012	Madua Norte	2.7%	515	475	▴	0.56%
071221013	Madua Sur	3.8%	731	699	▴	0.31%
071221014	Mambool	3.2%	607	556	▴	0.61%
071221015	Mawi	2.7%	523	518	▴	0.07%
071221016	Payao	3.3%	639	598	▴	0.46%
071221017	San Antonio (Poblacion)	6.2%	1,181	1,211	▾	−0.17%
071221018	San Isidro	4.3%	816	809	▴	0.06%
071221019	San Pedro	7.7%	1,467	1,334	▴	0.66%
071221021	Taytay	3.2%	611	525	▴	1.06%
	Total		19,136	17,580	▴	0.59%

=== Climate ===
Climate data for Duero, Bohol
Month	Jan	Feb	Mar	Apr	May	Jun	Jul	Aug	Sep	Oct	Nov	Dec	Year
Mean daily maximum °C (°F)	28 (82)	29 (84)	30 (86)	31 (88)	31 (88)	30 (86)	30 (86)	30 (86)	30 (86)	29 (84)	29 (84)	29 (84)	30 (85)
Mean daily minimum °C (°F)	23 (73)	22 (72)	23 (73)	23 (73)	24 (75)	25 (77)	24 (75)	24 (75)	24 (75)	24 (75)	23 (73)	23 (73)	24 (74)
Average precipitation mm (inches)	102 (4.0)	85 (3.3)	91 (3.6)	75 (3.0)	110 (4.3)	141 (5.6)	121 (4.8)	107 (4.2)	111 (4.4)	144 (5.7)	169 (6.7)	139 (5.5)	1,395 (55.1)
Average rainy days	18.6	14.8	16.5	16.7	23.9	26.4	25.6	24.1	24.4	26.3	23.7	20.5	261.5
Source: Meteoblue

== Demographics ==
Population census of Duero
Year	Pop.	±% p.a.
1903	6,853	—
1918	8,314	+1.30%
1939	9,272	+0.52%
1948	8,939	−0.41%
1960	8,929	−0.01%
1970	9,965	+1.10%
1975	11,522	+2.95%
1980	11,619	+0.17%
1990	14,242	+2.06%
1995	14,299	+0.07%
2000	16,485	+3.10%
2007	17,254	+0.63%
2010	17,580	+0.68%
2015	17,876	+0.32%
2020	18,861	+1.14%
2024	19,136	+0.35%
Source: Philippine Statistics Authority

== Economy ==
Poverty incidence of Duero (%)

Source: Philippine Statistics Authority

== Gallery ==
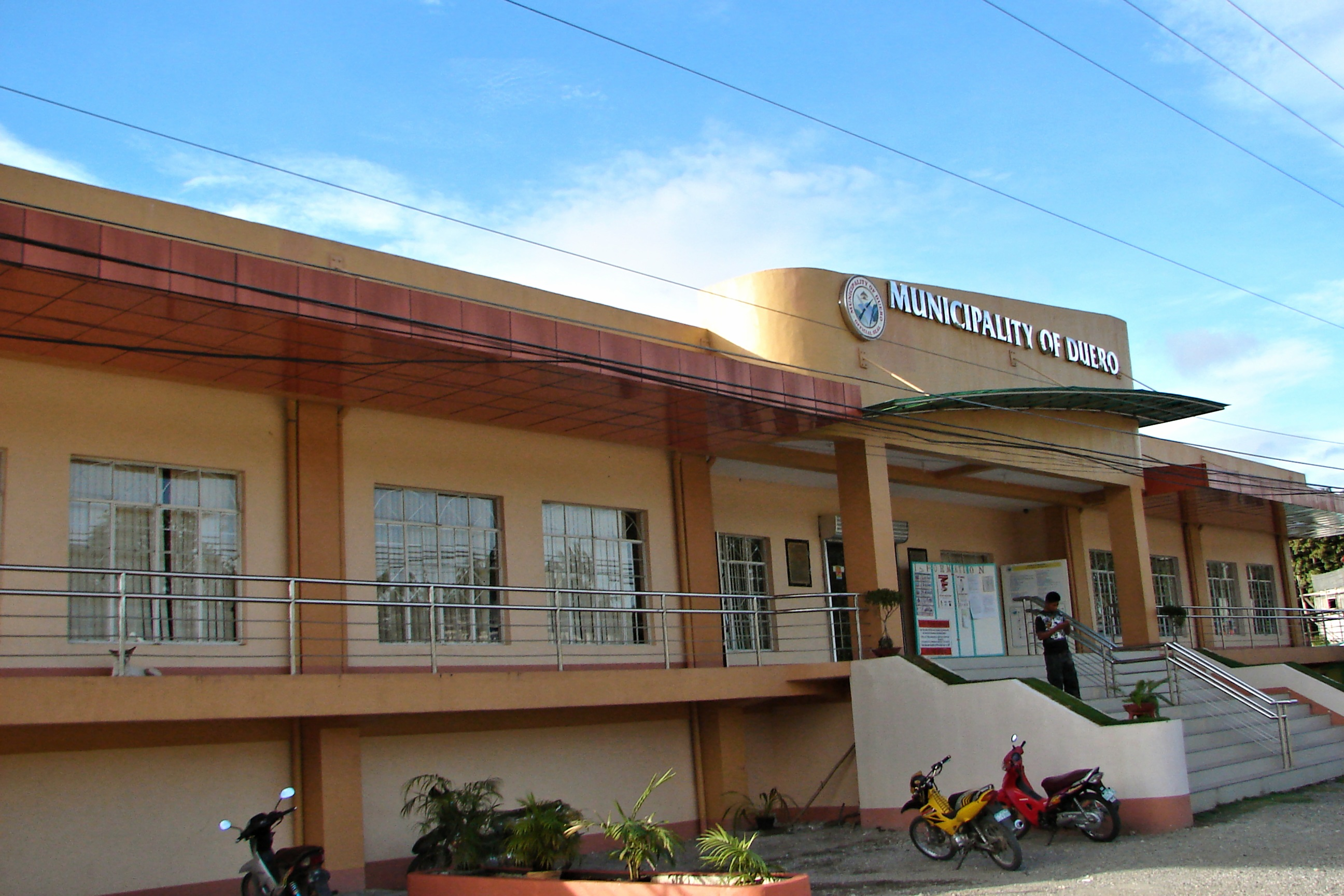
Duero town hall

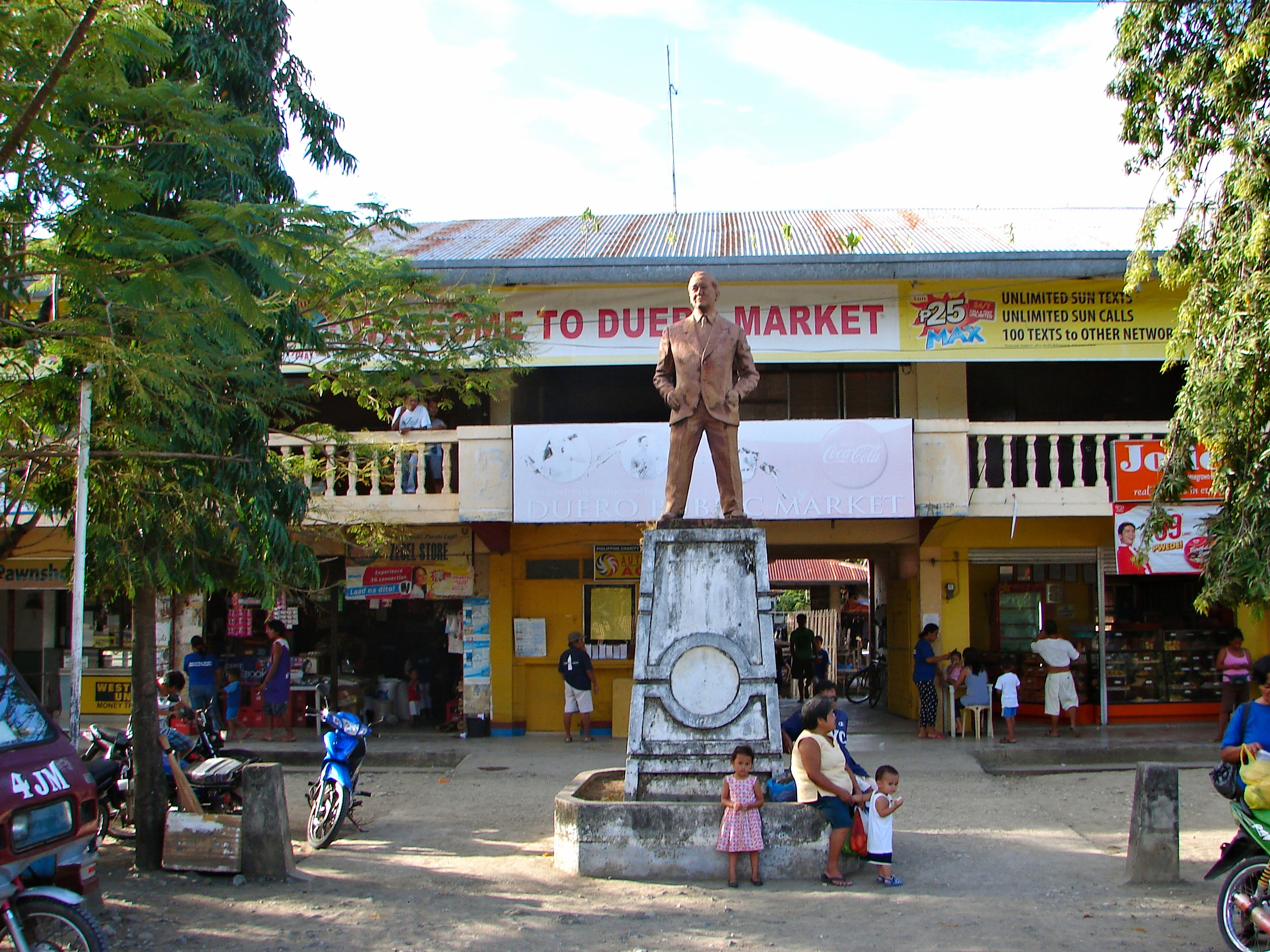
Public market

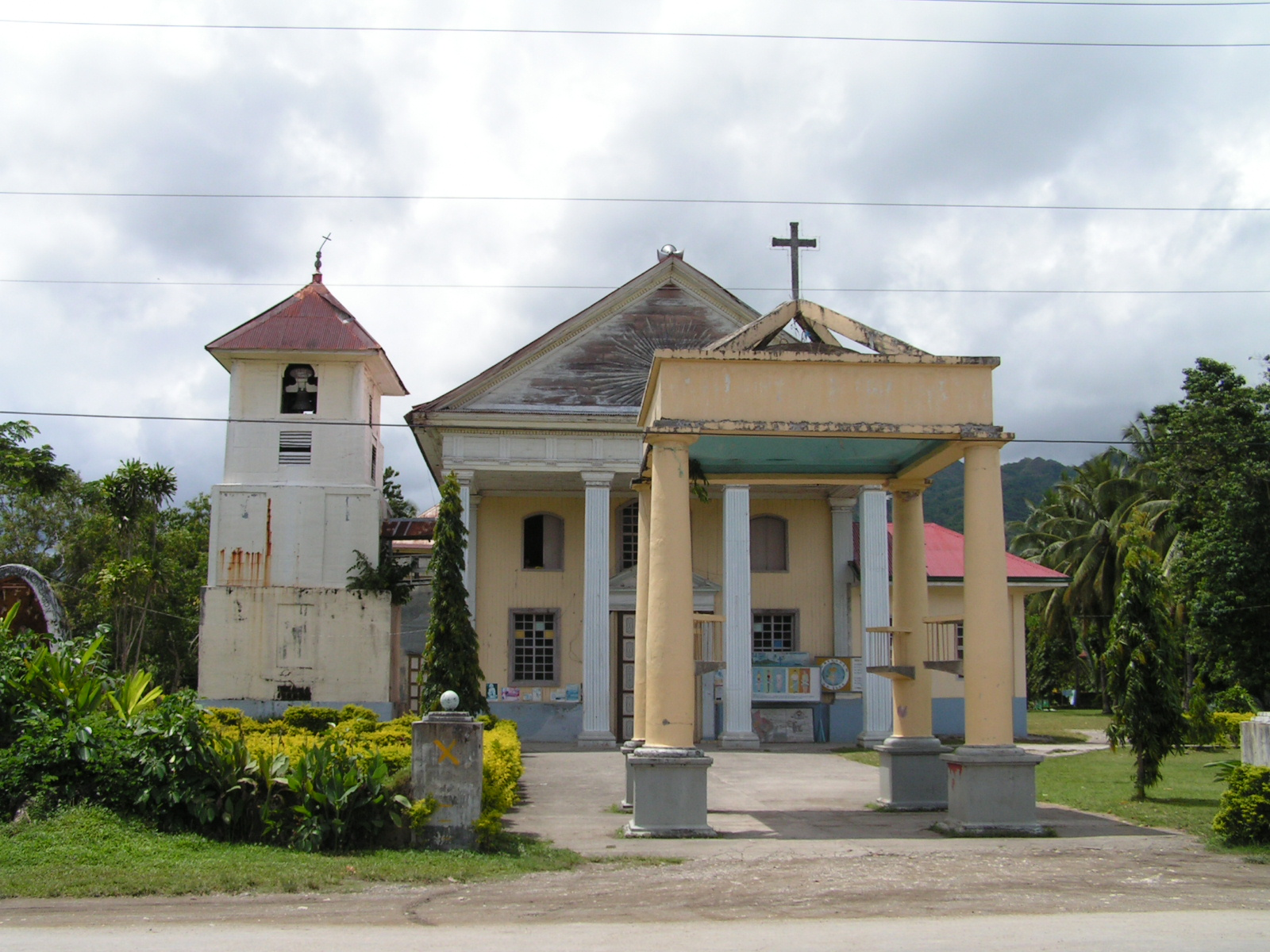
Church
