= KARS =

KARS may refer to:

- KARS1, a human gene which was previously denoted KARS
- KARS-FM, a radio station (102.9 FM) licensed to Laramie, Wyoming, United States
- KDNF, a radio station (860 AM) licensed to Belen, New Mexico, United States, which held the call sign KARS from 1961 to 2017
- Kuwait Amateur Radio Society

== See also ==
- Kars (disambiguation)
- CARS (disambiguation)
