= Təzəkənd, Khizi =

Human settlement in Azerbaijan

Coordinates: 40.8864°N 49.17068°E

Təzəkənd is a village in the municipality of Tıxlı in the Khizi Rayon of Azerbaijan.
