= Bohol's 3rd congressional district =

House of Representatives of the Philippines legislative district

- Constituency for the House of Representatives of the Philippines
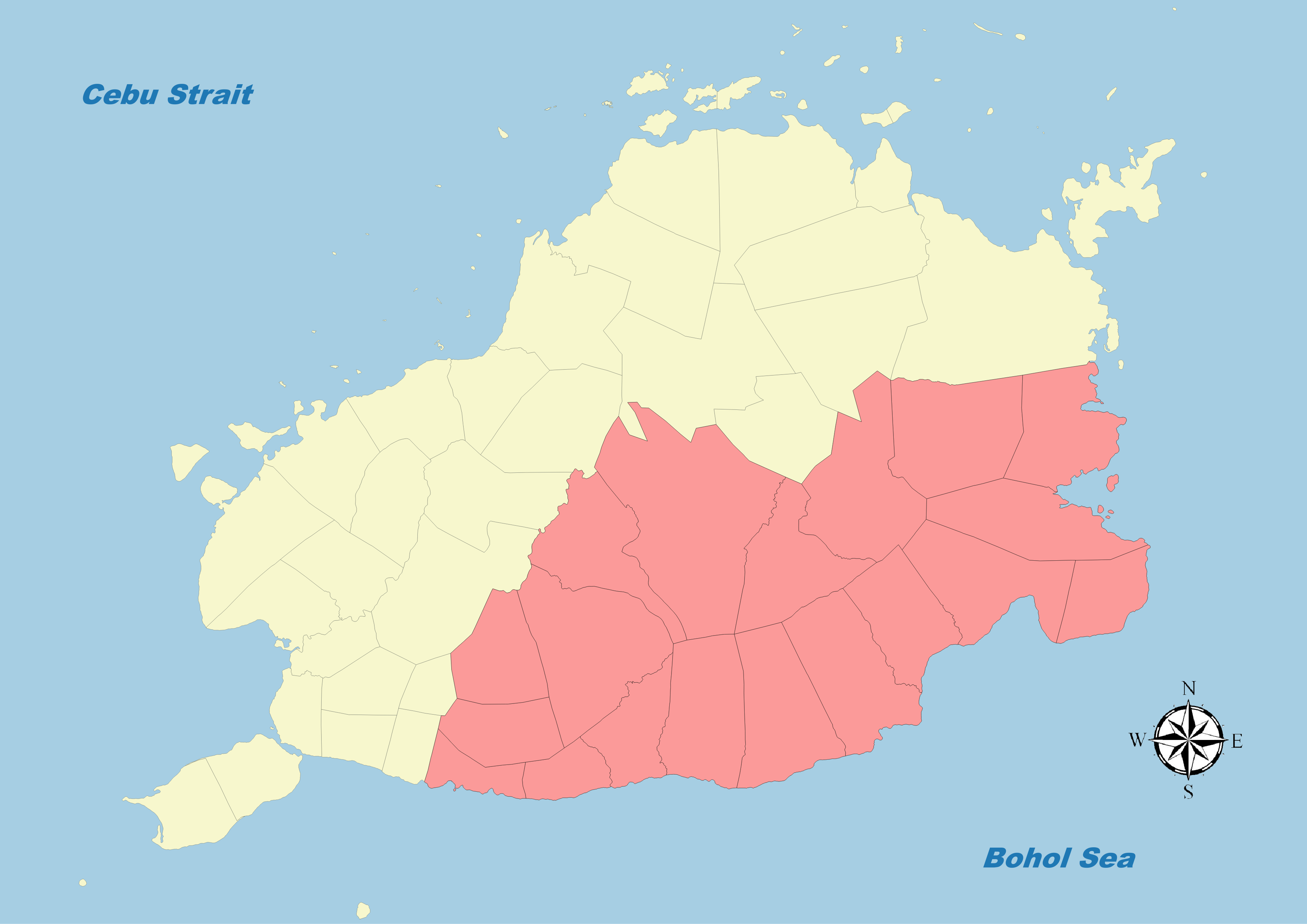
- Boundary of Bohol's 3rd congressional district in Bohol

- Location of Bohol within the Philippines
- Province: Bohol
- Region: Central Visayas
- Population: 452,705 (2020)
- Electorate: 320,786 (2022)
- Major settlements: 19 LGUs: Municipalities; Alicia; Anda; Batuan; Bilar; Candijay; Carmen; Dimiao; Duero; Garcia Hernandez; Guindulman; Jagna; Lila; Loay; Loboc; Mabini; Pilar; Sevilla; Sierra Bullones; Valencia
- Area: 2,187.54 km^{2} (844.61 sq mi)

Current constituency
- Created: 1907
- Representative: Alexie Tutor
- Political party: NUP
- Congressional bloc: Majority

Bohol's 3rd congressional district is one of the three congressional districts of the Philippines in the province of Bohol. It has been represented in the House of Representatives of the Philippines since 1916 and earlier in the Philippine Assembly from 1907 to 1916. The district consists of the southeastern municipalities of Alicia, Anda, Batuan, Bilar, Candijay, Carmen, Dimiao, Duero, Garcia Hernandez, Guindulman, Jagna, Lila, Loay, Loboc, Mabini, Pilar, Sevilla, Sierra Bullones and Valencia. It is currently represented in the 20th Congress by Alexie Tutor of the National Unity Party (NUP).

== Representation history ==
#	Image	Member	Term of office		Legislature	Party	Electoral history	Constituent LGUs
#	Image	Member	Start	End	Legislature	Party	Electoral history	Constituent LGUs
=== Bohol's 3rd district for the Philippine Assembly ===
District created January 9, 1907.
1		Eutiquio Boyles	October 16, 1907	October 16, 1912	1st	Independent	Elected in 1907.	1907–1916; Anda, Candijay, Duero, Garcia Hernandez, Getafe, Guindulman, Jagna, Mabini, Sierra Bullones, Talibon, Ubay, Valencia
1		Eutiquio Boyles	October 16, 1907	October 16, 1912	2nd	Independent	Re-elected in 1909.	1907–1916; Anda, Candijay, Duero, Garcia Hernandez, Getafe, Guindulman, Jagna, Mabini, Sierra Bullones, Talibon, Ubay, Valencia
2		Juan Virtudes	October 16, 1912	October 16, 1916	3rd	Nacionalista	Elected in 1912.	1907–1916; Anda, Candijay, Duero, Garcia Hernandez, Getafe, Guindulman, Jagna, Mabini, Sierra Bullones, Talibon, Ubay, Valencia
=== Bohol's 3rd district for the House of Representatives of the Philippine Islands ===
3		Filomeno Caseñas	October 16, 1916	June 6, 1922	4th	Nacionalista	Elected in 1916.	1916–1935; Anda, Candijay, Duero, Garcia Hernandez, Getafe, Guindulman, Jagna, Mabini, Sierra Bullones, Talibon, Ubay, Valencia
3		Filomeno Caseñas	October 16, 1916	June 6, 1922	5th	Nacionalista	Re-elected in 1919.	1916–1935; Anda, Candijay, Duero, Garcia Hernandez, Getafe, Guindulman, Jagna, Mabini, Sierra Bullones, Talibon, Ubay, Valencia
4		Teodoro Abueva	June 6, 1922	June 2, 1925	6th	Nacionalista; Unipersonalista	Elected in 1922.	1916–1935; Anda, Candijay, Duero, Garcia Hernandez, Getafe, Guindulman, Jagna, Mabini, Sierra Bullones, Talibon, Ubay, Valencia
5		Carlos P. García	June 2, 1925	June 2, 1931	7th	Nacionalista; Consolidado	Elected in 1925.	1916–1935; Anda, Candijay, Duero, Garcia Hernandez, Getafe, Guindulman, Jagna, Mabini, Sierra Bullones, Talibon, Ubay, Valencia
5		Carlos P. García	June 2, 1925	June 2, 1931	8th	Nacionalista; Consolidado	Re-elected in 1928.	1916–1935; Anda, Candijay, Duero, Garcia Hernandez, Getafe, Guindulman, Jagna, Mabini, Sierra Bullones, Talibon, Ubay, Valencia
(3)		Filomeno Caseñas	June 2, 1931	June 5, 1934	9th	Nacionalista; Consolidado	Elected in 1931.	1916–1935; Anda, Candijay, Duero, Garcia Hernandez, Getafe, Guindulman, Jagna, Mabini, Sierra Bullones, Talibon, Ubay, Valencia
6		Margarito E. Revilles	June 5, 1934	September 16, 1935	10th	Nacionalista; Demócrata Pro-Independencia	Elected in 1934.	1916–1935; Anda, Candijay, Duero, Garcia Hernandez, Getafe, Guindulman, Jagna, Mabini, Sierra Bullones, Talibon, Ubay, Valencia
#	Image	Member	Term of office		National Assembly	Party	Electoral history	Constituent LGUs
#	Image	Member	Start	End	National Assembly	Party	Electoral history	Constituent LGUs
=== Bohol's 3rd district for the National Assembly (Commonwealth of the Philippines) ===
(6)		Margarito E. Revilles	September 16, 1935	December 30, 1938	1st	Nacionalista; Demócrata Pro-Independencia	Re-elected in 1935.	1935–1941; Anda, Candijay, Duero, Garcia Hernandez, Getafe, Guindulman, Jagna, Mabini, Sierra Bullones, Talibon, Ubay, Valencia
7		Teófilo B. Buslon	December 30, 1938	December 30, 1941	2nd	Nacionalista	Elected in 1938.	1935–1941; Anda, Candijay, Duero, Garcia Hernandez, Getafe, Guindulman, Jagna, Mabini, Sierra Bullones, Talibon, Ubay, Valencia
District dissolved into the two-seat Bohol's at-large district for the National Assembly (Second Philippine Republic).
#	Image	Member	Term of office		Common wealth Congress	Party	Electoral history	Constituent LGUs
#	Image	Member	Start	End	Common wealth Congress	Party	Electoral history	Constituent LGUs
=== Bohol's 3rd district for the House of Representatives of the Commonwealth of the Philippines ===
District re-created May 24, 1945.
(6)		Margarito E. Revilles	–	–	1st	Nacionalista	Elected in 1941. Died before start of term.	1945–1946; Anda, Candijay, Duero, Garcia Hernandez, Getafe, Guindulman, Jagna, Mabini, Sierra Bullones, Talibon, Ubay, Valencia
#	Image	Member	Term of office		Congress	Party	Electoral history	Constituent LGUs
#	Image	Member	Start	End	Congress	Party	Electoral history	Constituent LGUs
=== Bohol's 3rd district for the House of Representatives of the Philippines ===
8		Cosme P. García	May 25, 1946	December 30, 1949	1st	Nacionalista	Elected in 1946.	1946–1949; Anda, Candijay, Duero, Garcia Hernandez, Getafe, Guindulman, Jagna, Mabini, Sierra Bullones, Talibon, Ubay, Valencia
9		Esteban Bernido	December 30, 1949	December 30, 1957	2nd	Nacionalista	Elected in 1949.	1949–1957; Alicia, Anda, Candijay, Duero, Garcia Hernandez, Getafe, Guindulman, Jagna, Mabini, Sierra Bullones, Talibon, Trinidad, Ubay, Valencia
9		Esteban Bernido	December 30, 1949	December 30, 1957	3rd	Nacionalista	Re-elected in 1953.	1949–1957; Alicia, Anda, Candijay, Duero, Garcia Hernandez, Getafe, Guindulman, Jagna, Mabini, Sierra Bullones, Talibon, Trinidad, Ubay, Valencia
10		Maximino A. García	December 30, 1957	December 30, 1965	4th	Nacionalista	Elected in 1957.	1957–1961; Alicia, Anda, Candijay, Dagohoy, Duero, Garcia Hernandez, Getafe, Guindulman, Jagna, Mabini, Sierra Bullones, Talibon, Trinidad, Ubay, Valencia
10		Maximino A. García	December 30, 1957	December 30, 1965	5th	Nacionalista	Re-elected in 1961.	1961–1969; Alicia, Anda, Buenavista, Candijay, Dagohoy, Danao, Duero, Garcia Hernandez, Getafe, Guindulman, Jagna, Mabini, Pilar, San Miguel, Sierra Bullones, Talibon, Trinidad, Ubay, Valencia
11		Teodoro B. Galagar	December 30, 1965	September 23, 1972	6th	Nacionalista	Elected in 1965.	1961–1969; Alicia, Anda, Buenavista, Candijay, Dagohoy, Danao, Duero, Garcia Hernandez, Getafe, Guindulman, Jagna, Mabini, Pilar, San Miguel, Sierra Bullones, Talibon, Trinidad, Ubay, Valencia
11		Teodoro B. Galagar	December 30, 1965	September 23, 1972	7th	Nacionalista	Re-elected in 1969. Removed from office after imposition of martial law.	1969–1972; Alicia, Anda, Buenavista, Candijay, Dagohoy, Danao, Duero, Garcia Hernandez, Getafe, Guindulman, Jagna, Mabini, Pilar, Pitogo, San Miguel, Sierra Bullones, Talibon, Trinidad, Ubay, Valencia
District dissolved into the thirteen-seat Region VII's at-large district for the Interim Batasang Pambansa, followed by the three-seat Bohol's at-large district for the Regular Batasang Pambansa.
District re-created February 2, 1987.
12		Isidro C. Zarraga	June 30, 1987	June 30, 1998	8th	Lakas ng Bansa	Elected in 1987.	1987–present Alicia, Anda, Batuan, Bilar, Candijay, Carmen, Dimiao, Duero, Garcia Hernandez, Guindulman, Jagna, Lila, Loay, Loboc, Mabini, Pilar, Sevilla, Sierra Bullones, Valencia
12		Isidro C. Zarraga	June 30, 1987	June 30, 1998	9th	Lakas	Re-elected in 1992.	1987–present Alicia, Anda, Batuan, Bilar, Candijay, Carmen, Dimiao, Duero, Garcia Hernandez, Guindulman, Jagna, Lila, Loay, Loboc, Mabini, Pilar, Sevilla, Sierra Bullones, Valencia
12		Isidro C. Zarraga	June 30, 1987	June 30, 1998	10th	Lakas	Re-elected in 1995.	1987–present Alicia, Anda, Batuan, Bilar, Candijay, Carmen, Dimiao, Duero, Garcia Hernandez, Guindulman, Jagna, Lila, Loay, Loboc, Mabini, Pilar, Sevilla, Sierra Bullones, Valencia
13		Eladio Jala	June 30, 1998	June 30, 2007	11th	LDP (LAMMP)	Elected in 1998.	1987–present Alicia, Anda, Batuan, Bilar, Candijay, Carmen, Dimiao, Duero, Garcia Hernandez, Guindulman, Jagna, Lila, Loay, Loboc, Mabini, Pilar, Sevilla, Sierra Bullones, Valencia
13		Eladio Jala	June 30, 1998	June 30, 2007	12th	Lakas	Re-elected in 2001.	1987–present Alicia, Anda, Batuan, Bilar, Candijay, Carmen, Dimiao, Duero, Garcia Hernandez, Guindulman, Jagna, Lila, Loay, Loboc, Mabini, Pilar, Sevilla, Sierra Bullones, Valencia
13		Eladio Jala	June 30, 1998	June 30, 2007	13th	Lakas	Re-elected in 2004.	1987–present Alicia, Anda, Batuan, Bilar, Candijay, Carmen, Dimiao, Duero, Garcia Hernandez, Guindulman, Jagna, Lila, Loay, Loboc, Mabini, Pilar, Sevilla, Sierra Bullones, Valencia
14		Adam Jala	June 30, 2007	June 30, 2010	14th	Lakas	Elected in 2007.	1987–present Alicia, Anda, Batuan, Bilar, Candijay, Carmen, Dimiao, Duero, Garcia Hernandez, Guindulman, Jagna, Lila, Loay, Loboc, Mabini, Pilar, Sevilla, Sierra Bullones, Valencia
15		Arthur C. Yap	June 30, 2010	June 30, 2019	15th	NPC	Elected in 2010.	1987–present Alicia, Anda, Batuan, Bilar, Candijay, Carmen, Dimiao, Duero, Garcia Hernandez, Guindulman, Jagna, Lila, Loay, Loboc, Mabini, Pilar, Sevilla, Sierra Bullones, Valencia
15		Arthur C. Yap	June 30, 2010	June 30, 2019	16th	NPC	Re-elected in 2013.	1987–present Alicia, Anda, Batuan, Bilar, Candijay, Carmen, Dimiao, Duero, Garcia Hernandez, Guindulman, Jagna, Lila, Loay, Loboc, Mabini, Pilar, Sevilla, Sierra Bullones, Valencia
15		Arthur C. Yap	June 30, 2010	June 30, 2019	17th	PDP–Laban	Re-elected in 2016.	1987–present Alicia, Anda, Batuan, Bilar, Candijay, Carmen, Dimiao, Duero, Garcia Hernandez, Guindulman, Jagna, Lila, Loay, Loboc, Mabini, Pilar, Sevilla, Sierra Bullones, Valencia
16		Kristine Alexie Besas-Tutor	June 30, 2019	Incumbent	18th	Nacionalista	Elected in 2019.	1987–present Alicia, Anda, Batuan, Bilar, Candijay, Carmen, Dimiao, Duero, Garcia Hernandez, Guindulman, Jagna, Lila, Loay, Loboc, Mabini, Pilar, Sevilla, Sierra Bullones, Valencia
16		Kristine Alexie Besas-Tutor	June 30, 2019	Incumbent	19th	Lakas	Re-elected in 2022.	1987–present Alicia, Anda, Batuan, Bilar, Candijay, Carmen, Dimiao, Duero, Garcia Hernandez, Guindulman, Jagna, Lila, Loay, Loboc, Mabini, Pilar, Sevilla, Sierra Bullones, Valencia
16		Kristine Alexie Besas-Tutor	June 30, 2019	Incumbent	20th	NUP	Re-elected in 2025.	1987–present Alicia, Anda, Batuan, Bilar, Candijay, Carmen, Dimiao, Duero, Garcia Hernandez, Guindulman, Jagna, Lila, Loay, Loboc, Mabini, Pilar, Sevilla, Sierra Bullones, Valencia

== Election results ==
=== 2025 ===
2025 Philippine House of Representatives elections
Candidate	Party	Votes	%
Alexie Tutor (incumbent)	Lakas–CMD	184,280	72.23
Makdo Castañares	Liberal Party	70,849	27.77
Total		255,129	100.00
Valid votes		255,129	89.21
Invalid/blank votes		30,856	10.79
Total votes		285,985	100.00
Registered voters/turnout		326,765	87.52
Lakas–CMD hold			
Source: Commission on Elections

=== 2022 ===
2022 Philippine House of Representatives elections
Party	Candidate	Votes	%
Nacionalista	Alexie Tutor (incumbent)	167,359	
PDP–Laban	Kat-Kat Lim	88,686	
WPP	Roger Cadorniga	1,326	
Total votes			100.00%
Nacionalista hold			

=== 2019 ===
2019 Philippine House of Representatives elections
Party	Candidate	Votes	%
Nacionalista	Alexie Tutor	74,991	33.21%
PFP	Conchita Toribio-delos Reyes	65,954	29.21%
PMP	Dionisio Balite	42,877	18.99%
NUP	Carlos Fernando	41,958	18.58%
Total votes		225,780	100.00%
Nacionalista gain from PDP–Laban			

=== 2016 ===
2016 Philippine House of Representatives elections
Party	Candidate	Votes	%
NPC	Arthur Yap	121,093	57.39%
PDP–Laban	Conchita Toribio-delos Reyes	89,918	42.61%
Total votes		211,011	100.00%
NPC hold			

=== 2013 ===
2013 Philippine House of Representatives elections
Party	Candidate	Votes	%
NPC	Arthur Yap	127,909	100.00
Total votes		127,909	100.00

=== 2010 ===
2010 Philippine House of Representatives elections
Party	Candidate	Votes	%
Lakas–Kampi	Arthur Yap	136,164	100.00
Total votes		136,164	100.00

== See also ==
- Legislative districts of Bohol
