= Tıxlı =

- Municipality
- Location within Azerbaijan
- Coordinates: 40°54′47″N 49°06′24″E
- Country: Azerbaijan
- Rayon: Khizi

Population
  - Total: 546
- Time zone: UTC+4 (AZT)
  - Summer (DST): UTC+5 (AZT)

Tıxlı (also, Takyali, Tykh, and Tykhly) is a village and municipality in the Khizi Rayon of Azerbaijan. It has a population of 546. The municipality consists of the villages of Tıxlı, Qars, Əngilan, and Təzəkənd.
