= Qars =

- Location within Azerbaijan
- Coordinates: 40°51′30″N 49°03′37″E
- Country: Azerbaijan
- Rayon: Khizi
- Municipality: Tıxlı

Population (2014)
  - Total: 0
- Time zone: UTC+4 (AZT)
  - Summer (DST): UTC+5 (AZT)

Qars (also, Kars) is a former village in the Khizi Rayon of Azerbaijan. The village formed part of the municipality of Tıxlı.
