= Candijay =

Municipality in Bohol, Philippines

- Municipality
- Municipality of Candijay
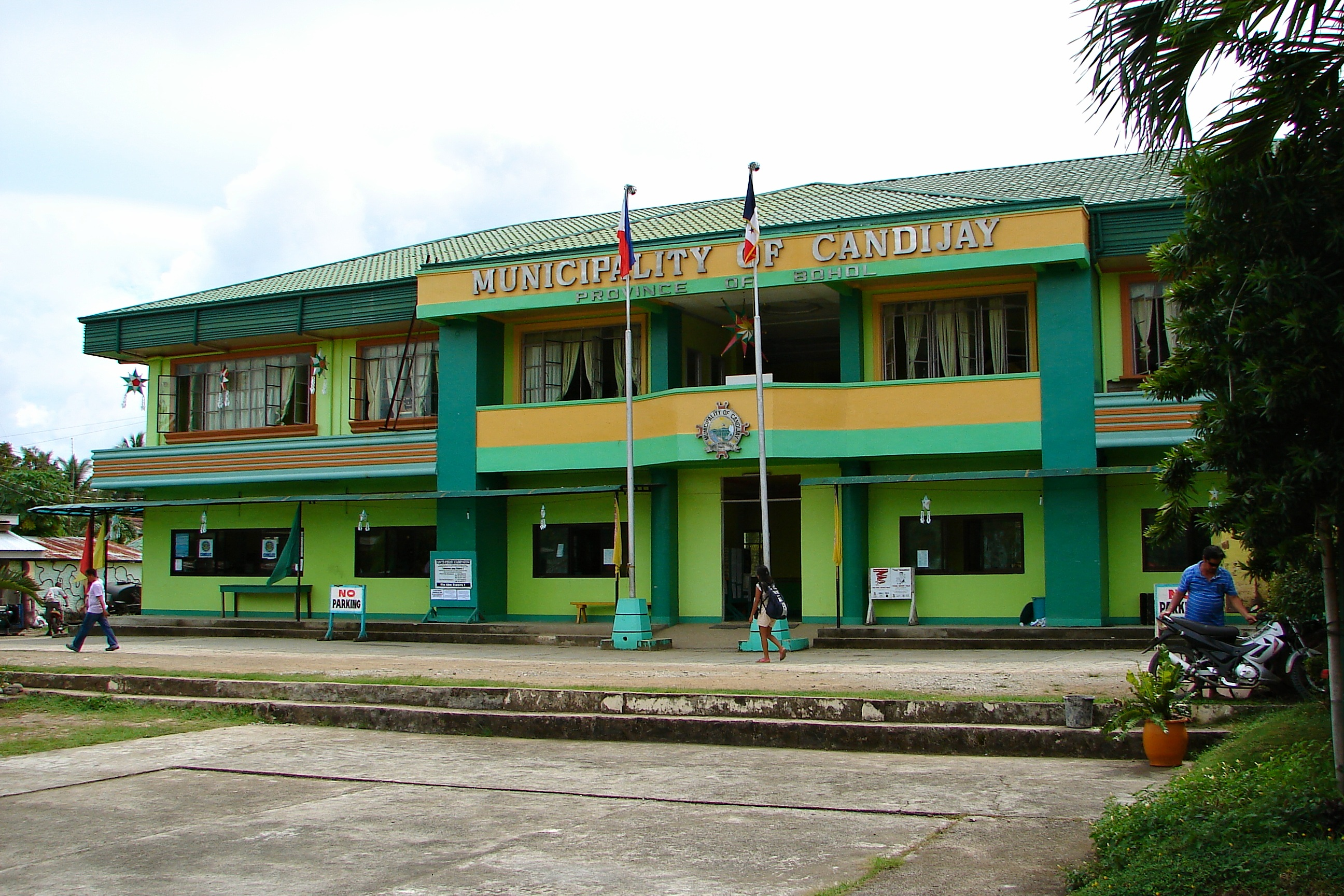
- Candijay Town Hall

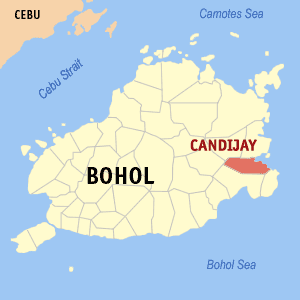
- Map of Bohol with Candijay highlighted
- Interactive map of Candijay
- Location within the Philippines
- Coordinates: 9°49′05″N 124°29′46″E
- Country: Philippines
- Region: Central Visayas
- Province: Bohol
- District: 3rd district
- Founded: 29 November 1854
- Barangays: 21 (see Barangays)

Government
  - Type: Sangguniang Bayan
  - Mayor: Thamar Olaivar
  - Vice Mayor: Christopher Tutor
  - Representative: Kristine Alexie B. Tutor
  - Municipal Council: Members: HON. JONATHAN V. SALES; HON. GEROME G. DOTAROT; HON. JIMMY D. BUSANO; HON. ARNIELITO S. OLANDRIA; HON. CHARINA C. BAGOR; HON. RENATO O. TUTOR; HON. ARLENE A. CAADLAWON; HON. ERLINDA B. CURATIVO
  - Electorate: 22,114 voters (2025)

Area
  - Total: 103.26 km^{2} (39.87 sq mi)
- Elevation: 17.8 m (58 ft)
- Highest elevation: 346 m (1,135 ft)
- Lowest elevation: −1 m (−3.3 ft)

Population (2024 census)
  - Total: 30,142
  - Density: 291.90/km^{2} (756.03/sq mi)
  - Households: 7,214

Economy
  - Income class: 3rd municipal income class
  - Poverty incidence: 21.26% (2023)
  - Revenue: ₱ 169.5 million (2024)
  - Assets: ₱ 545.1 million (2024)
  - Expenditure: ₱ 76.64 million (2024)
  - Liabilities: ₱ 90.48 million (2024)

Service provider
  - Electricity: Bohol 2 Electric Cooperative (BOHECO 2)
- Time zone: UTC+8 (PST)
- ZIP code: 6312
- PSGC: 0701211000
- IDD : area code: +63 (0)38
- Native languages: Boholano dialect Cebuano; Tagalog
- Website: candijay-bohol.gov.ph

Candijay, officially the Municipality of Candijay (Cebuano: Munisipyo sa Candijay; Tagalog: Bayan ng Candijay), is a municipality in the province of Bohol, Philippines. According to the 2024 census, it has a population of 30,142 people.

Candijay is home to the Bohol Island State University (BISU), which offers college courses related to Fishery Science, Teacher Education, Business and Management, and other science-related programs. It also has educational facilities for elementary and secondary levels in almost all barangays of the municipality.

== History ==
The name of the town is believed to have been derived from the phrase *“Kang Dihay,”* meaning “belonging to Dihay,” a figure described as a strong leader with many followers. Over time, the name evolved into Candijay. The town was organized during the Spanish period and, by 1879, was one of the 34 towns in the province, with a recorded population of 5,030.

The municipality of Candijay was one of the 34 towns established during the Spanish regime in 1879 and so was its establishment as a parish. The people were eventually converted to the Roman Catholic religion by the Spaniards. The parochial church of Candijay is dedicated to Saint Joseph whose feast day is 19 May.

== Geography ==
Candijay is located on the eastern side of Bohol, 97 kilometres (60 mi) from Tagbilaran. The town has a land area of 8,687 hectares (21,470 acres).

The town faces Cogtong Bay which has the most diverse mangrove ecosystem in Bohol. The bay is home to 32 of the Philippines' 47 species of mangroves and associates. Yet due to illegal fishing and mismanagement of the mangroves, the mangroves and marine life in the area dwindled. To rectify the damage done, the municipal government is now engaged in a coastal resource management program: the planting of mangroves, though the control and eventual abolition of illegal fishing has yet to be addressed.

=== Barangays ===
Candijay is politically subdivided into 21 barangays. Each barangay consists of puroks and some have sitios.

PSGC	Barangay	Population			±% p.a.	
		2024		2010		
071211001	Abihilan	5.3%	1,603	1,209	▴	1.98%
071211002	Anoling	3.7%	1,113	1,114	▾	−0.01%
071211003	Boyo‑an	5.3%	1,610	1,612	▾	−0.01%
071211004	Cadapdapan	4.2%	1,273	1,381	▾	−0.56%
071211005	Cambane	1.4%	416	435	▾	−0.31%
071211006	Can‑olin	7.1%	2,155	2,215	▾	−0.19%
071211007	Canawa	4.5%	1,370	1,415	▾	−0.22%
071211008	Cogtong	8.6%	2,605	2,492	▴	0.31%
071211009	La Union	4.8%	1,449	1,365	▴	0.42%
071211010	Luan	2.4%	731	886	▾	−1.33%
071211011	Lungsoda‑an	5.0%	1,499	1,461	▴	0.18%
071211012	Mahangin	3.0%	891	906	▾	−0.12%
071211013	Pagahat	2.2%	669	1,000	▾	−2.76%
071211014	Panadtaran	3.2%	969	1,002	▾	−0.23%
071211015	Panas	5.6%	1,675	1,477	▴	0.88%
071211016	Poblacion	11.3%	3,421	3,344	▴	0.16%
071211017	San Isidro	3.7%	1,124	1,042	▴	0.53%
071211018	Tambongan	5.1%	1,542	1,587	▾	−0.20%
071211019	Tawid	3.6%	1,090	1,089	▴	0.01%
071211022	Tubod (Tres Rosas)	2.9%	888	928	▾	−0.31%
071211021	Tugas	5.5%	1,650	1,640	▴	0.04%
	Total		30,142	29,043	▴	0.26%

=== Climate ===
Climate data for Candijay, Bohol
Month	Jan	Feb	Mar	Apr	May	Jun	Jul	Aug	Sep	Oct	Nov	Dec	Year
Mean daily maximum °C (°F)	28 (82)	29 (84)	30 (86)	31 (88)	31 (88)	30 (86)	30 (86)	30 (86)	30 (86)	29 (84)	29 (84)	29 (84)	30 (85)
Mean daily minimum °C (°F)	23 (73)	22 (72)	23 (73)	23 (73)	24 (75)	25 (77)	24 (75)	24 (75)	24 (75)	24 (75)	23 (73)	23 (73)	24 (74)
Average precipitation mm (inches)	102 (4.0)	85 (3.3)	91 (3.6)	75 (3.0)	110 (4.3)	141 (5.6)	121 (4.8)	107 (4.2)	111 (4.4)	144 (5.7)	169 (6.7)	139 (5.5)	1,395 (55.1)
Average rainy days	18.6	14.8	16.5	16.7	23.9	26.4	25.6	24.1	24.4	26.3	23.7	20.5	261.5
Source: Meteoblue (Use with caution: this is modeled/calculated data, not measured locally.)

== Demographics ==
Population census of Candijay
Year	Pop.	±% p.a.
1903	6,522	—
1918	8,372	+1.68%
1939	13,749	+2.39%
1948	15,658	+1.46%
1960	16,035	+0.20%
1970	17,114	+0.65%
1975	19,750	+2.91%
1980	21,342	+1.56%
1990	26,102	+2.03%
1995	25,729	−0.27%
2000	30,389	+3.63%
2007	31,183	+0.36%
2010	29,043	−2.55%
2015	29,475	+0.28%
2020	30,119	+0.46%
2024	30,142	+0.02%
Source: Philippine Statistics Authority

== Economy ==
Poverty incidence of Candijay (%)

Source: Philippine Statistics Authority

== Tourism ==
Candijay has several natural resources. Among these which consequently are visited by both foreign and local tourists are the Can‑umantad Falls which is still being developed, the pristine cold spring Canawa Spring, in Canawa and the Kawasihan Islet Sand Bar in Panas.

There are also some potential eco-tourism destination which consequently start to attract visitors such as the Layog Caves in Luan, Sangat Cave in Tambongan and Ilaja Cave in Panas; the hinterland rice terraces in Tambongan, Canawa, Cadapdapan, Tubod and Abihilan; Danicop Gorge Brook in Cambane; the Kantaligsok Peak which is said to be the tallest peak found in Tugas; as well as the Candijay Mangrove Forests in Panadtaran. The community-based Panadtaran Mangrove Association (PAMAS), which seeks to preserve Panadtaran's mangroves and other natural resources in the area and promote them for eco-tourism pursuits, has now established the Candijay Mangrove Adventure Tour.

Candijay also boasts a man-made lake known as Boongon SWI.

== Education ==
High schools
  - Anoling National High School
  - Bohol Island State University - Candijay Campus, Teacher Education Laboratory High School
  - Candijay National High School
  - Cogtong National High School
  - La Union National High School
  - Saint Joseph Academy
  - Tambongan National High School
Elementary and primary schools
  - Abihilan Elementary School
  - Anoling Elementary School
  - Boy‑oan Elementary School
  - Cadapdapan Elementary School
  - Cambane Elementary School
  - Canawa Elementary School
  - Candijay Central Elementary School
  - Can‑olin Elementary School
  - Cogtong Elementary School
  - La Union Elementary School
  - Luan Elementary School
  - Lungsudaan Elementary School
  - Pagahat Elementary School
  - Panadtaran Elementary School
  - Panas Elementary School
  - Pangpang Elementary School
  - San Isidro Elementary School
  - Tambongan Elementary School
  - Tawid Elementary School
  - Tubod Elementary School
  - Tugas Elementary School

== Gallery ==
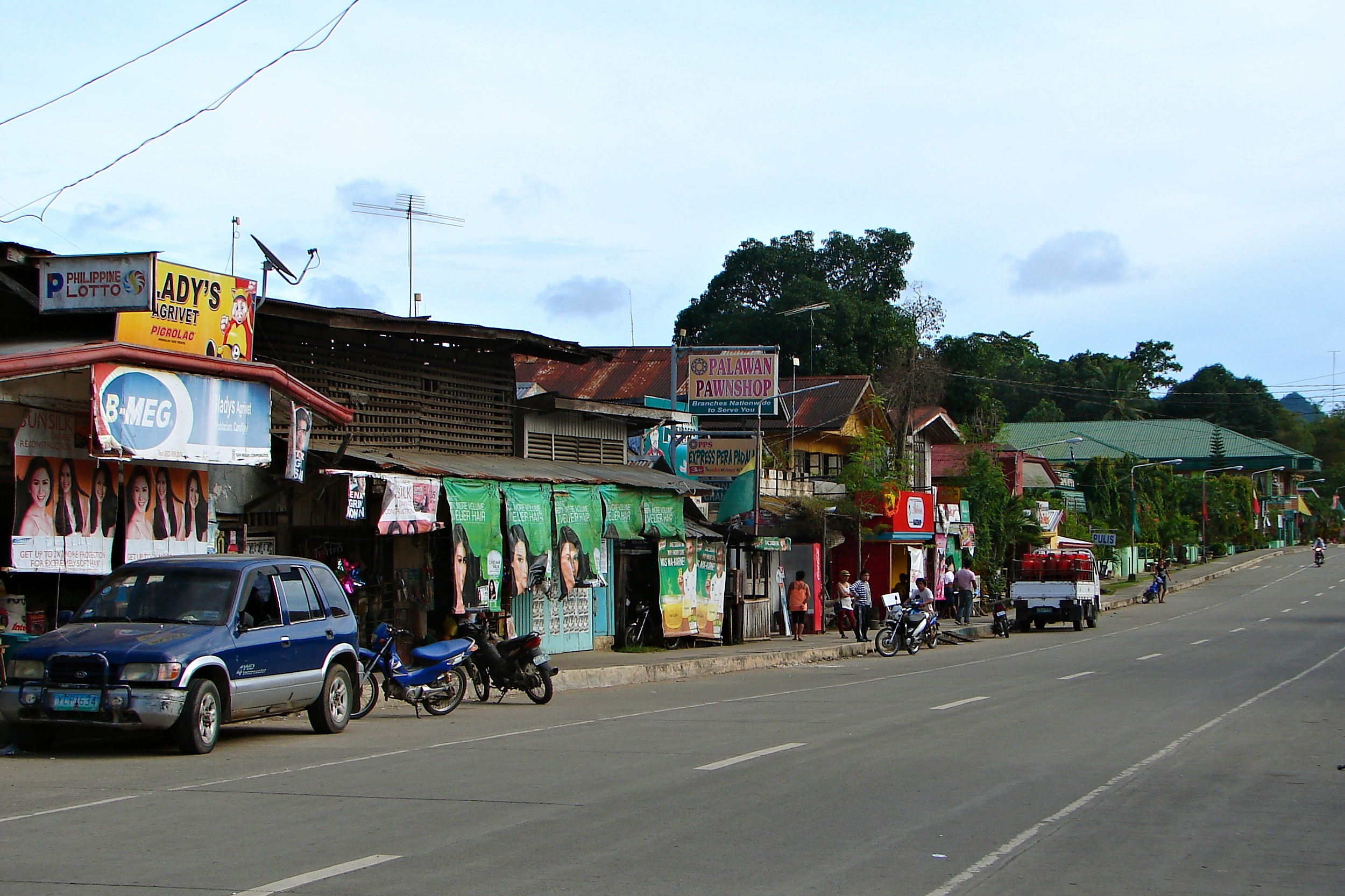
Poblacion

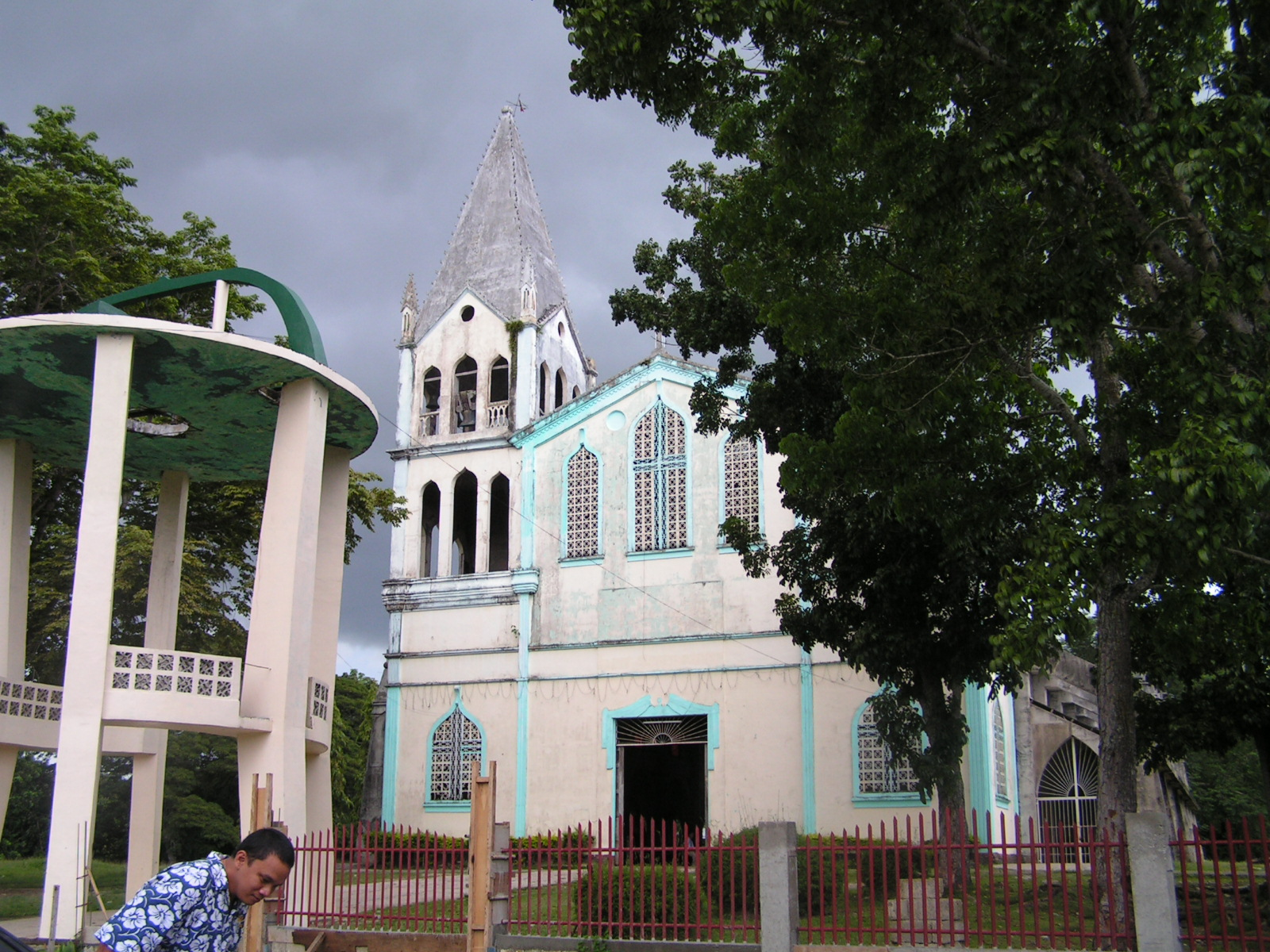
Roman Catholic Church, Candijay
