= Yuxarı Əngilan =

Yukhary Angelan
- Location within Azerbaijan
- Coordinates: 40°50′N 49°01′E
- Country: Azerbaijan
- Rayon: Khizi

Population (2014)
  - Total: 0
- Time zone: UTC+4 (AZT)
  - Summer (DST): UTC+5 (AZT)

Yuxarı Əngilan is a former village in the Khizi Rayon of Azerbaijan.
