= Alexie Tutor =

Filipino businesswoman and politician (born 1980)

Alexie Besas-Tutor
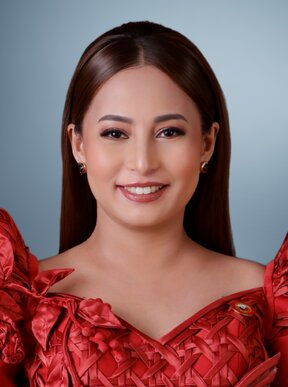
- Official portrait, 2025

Member of the Philippine House of Representatives from Bohol's 3rd District
- Incumbent
- Assumed office June 30, 2019
- Preceded by: Arthur C. Yap

Member of the Bohol Provincial Board from the 3rd district
- In office June 30, 2016 – June 30, 2019

Personal details
- Born: Kristine Alexie Tocmo Besas; January 24, 1980 (age 46) Cebu City, Philippines
- Party: NUP (2026–present)
- Other political affiliations: Lakas (2024–2026); Nacionalista (2018–2024); Liberal (2012–2018)
- Spouse(s): Christopher Tutor; Vice-Mayor, Candijay, Bohol

Kristine Alexie Tocmo Besas-Tutor, also known in Bohol as Lexie (born January 24, 1980), is a Filipino physical therapist and politician. She is a member of the House of Representatives, representing the Third District of Bohol since 2019.

== Education ==
Kristine Alexie completed both her basic education in 1993 and secondary education in 1997 at the Holy Spirit School of Tagbilaran. In 2002, she finished her tertiary education and graduated BS Physical Therapy at Velez College in Cebu City. Currently, she is a licensed physical therapist by profession and a law graduate.

== Political career ==
Tutor's first stint in politics was during the 2013 Bohol local elections when she ran for vice-mayor of Guindulman. Her opponent, which is the incumbent vice-mayor on that time won the seat by a slim margin. Eventually, Tutor became the first lady of Candijay when her husband, Christopher Tutor was elected as chief executive of the town.

=== Board Member, Bohol's 3rd District ===
During the 2016 Bohol local elections, Tutor ran and was elected as a member of Sangguniang Panlalawigan of Bohol's 3rd District earning the highest number of votes among the aspirants.

==== Provincial Board Committee membership ====
The young legislator held the following membership at the provincial board:

- Chairperson, Committee on Tourism
- Chairperson, Committee on Women and Family Welfare
- Vice-Chairperson, Committee on Trade and Industry
- Vice-Chairperson, Committee on Zoning and Rural Development
- Member, Committee on Health and Public Sanitation
- Member, Committee on Labor and Employment

=== Representative, Bohol's 3rd District ===
On May 14, 2019, Tutor won and elected as the new representative of the province's 3rd District during the 2019 Bohol local elections besting seasoned politicians namely, vice-governor Dionisio Balite, Carmen mayor Conchita Toribio-delos Reyes, and retired judge Carlos Fernando. She also became the first congresswoman from Bohol's 3rd District and second congresswoman from Bohol after Venice Borja-Agana.

The young lawmaker, together with her mayor husband, is known for their Pabahay Program which provides low-cost housing to indigent families of the district.

On November 6, 2020, Tutor launched the patient transport vehicle (PTV) service for the all residents of the 3rd district which made possible through various donations under Oplan Tabang program, providing free transportation services to indigent patients, PWD, and senior citizens access to medical facilities within the province.

On May 11, 2022, Tutor was reelected for second term as representative of the district.

On February 5, 2025, Tutor (No. 120) was one of three legislators of Bohol, together with 214 others signed the impeachment complaint against incumbent Vice President Sara Duterte at the plenary hall of House of Representatives.

==== House Committee membership ====
- Vice-chairperson, Health
- Member of the Majority, Appropriations
- Member of the Majority, Basic Education and Culture
- Member of the Majority, Foreign Affairs
- Member of the Majority, Higher and Technical Education
- Member of the Majority, Housing and Urban Development
- Member of the Majority, Overseas Workers Affairs
- Member of the Majority, Visayas Development
- Member of the Majority, Welfare of Children
- Member of the Majority, Women and Gender Equality
- Member of the Majority, Youth and Sports Development

== Passed bills ==
=== Principal authored bills ===
- HB04228 - enacted as Republic Act 11465 - General Appropriations Act of 2020, 2020-01-06
- HB05477 - enacted as Republic Act 11463 - Malasakit Centers Act of 2019, 2019-12-03
- HB05712 - enacted as Republic Act 11466 - Salary Standardization Law of 2019, 2020-01-08
- HB06895 - enacted as Republic Act 11480 - An Act Amending Section 3 of Republic Act No. 7797, Otherwise Known as "An Act to Lengthen The School Calendar From 200 days to not more than 220 Class Days" of 2020, 2020-07-17
- HB06953 - enacted as Republic Act 11494 - Bayanihan to Recover as One Act of 2020, 2020-09-11

=== Co-Authored Bills ===
- HB00219 (Consolidated into HB05712) - enacted as Republic Act 11466 - Salary Standardization Law of 2019, 2020-01-08

House of Representatives of the Philippines
Preceded by Arthur C. Yap	Member of the House of Representatives from Bohol's 3rd district 2019–present	Incumbent
