= List of members of the 15th Congress of the Philippines =

These are the members of the 15th Congress of the Philippines. The 15th Congress convened on July 26, 2010, and adjourned on June 6, 2013. Senators elected on the 2007 Senate election and senators elected on the 2010 Senate election comprise the Senate while representatives elected on the 2010 House of Representatives election comprise the House of Representatives.

== Senate ==
Places of registrations of the senators, with Metro Manila and Cavite, detailed below. Take note that senators are elected at a nationwide, at-large basis.
Places of registration of the senators from Metro Manila and Cavite.

The following are the terms of the senators of this Congress, according to the date of election:

- For senators elected on May 14, 2007: June 30, 2007 – June 30, 2013
- For senators elected on May 10, 2010: June 30, 2010 – June 30, 2016

Senator	Party	Term	Term end	Bloc	Registered in
Edgardo Angara	LDP	2	2013	Majority	Baler, Aurora
Joker Arroyo	Lakas	2	2013	Minority	Makati
Alan Peter Cayetano	Nacionalista	1	2013	Minority	Taguig
Pia Cayetano	Nacionalista	2	2016	Minority	Taguig
Miriam Defensor Santiago	PRP	2	2016	Minority	Quezon City
Franklin Drilon	Liberal	1	2016	Majority	Iloilo City
Francis Escudero	Independent	1	2013	Majority	Sorsogon City, Sorsogon
Jinggoy Estrada	UNA (Note: Jinggoy Estrada and Juan Ponce Enrile were affiliated with the Pwersa ng Masang Pilipino (PMP) as of the 2010 election. The PMP was later affiliated with the United Nationalist Alliance in 2012.)	2	2016	Majority	San Juan
TG Guingona	Liberal	1	2016	Majority	Malaybalay, Bukidnon
Gregorio Honasan	UNA (Note: Gregorio Honasan was an independent until 2012.)	1	2013	Majority	Marikina
Panfilo Lacson	Independent	2	2013	Majority	Imus, Cavite
Lito Lapid	Independent (Note: Lito Lapid was affiliated with Lakas–CMD until 2012.)	2	2016	Majority	Porac, Pampanga
Loren Legarda	NPC	1	2013	Majority	Malabon
Bongbong Marcos	Nacionalista	1	2016	Majority	Batac, Ilocos Norte
Serge Osmeña	Independent	1	2016	Majority	Makati
Kiko Pangilinan	Liberal	2	2013	Majority	Quezon City
Koko Pimentel (Note: Koko Pimentel took office on August 15, 2011, after winning an electoral protest against Juan Miguel Zubiri.)	PDP–Laban	0	2013	Majority	Cagayan de Oro
Juan Ponce Enrile	UNA	2	2016	Majority	Aparri, Cagayan
Ralph Recto	Liberal	1	2016	Majority	Lipa, Batangas
Bong Revilla	Lakas	2	2016	Majority	Imus, Cavite
Tito Sotto	NPC	1	2016	Majority	Quezon City
Antonio Trillanes (Note: Antonio Trillanes remained in detained for his involvement in the Oakwood mutiny and the Manila Peninsula siege until December 20, 2010.)	Nacionalista (Note: Antonio Trillanes was an independent until 2012.)	1	2013	Minority	Caloocan
Manny Villar	Nacionalista	2	2013	Minority	Las Piñas
Juan Miguel Zubiri (Note: Juan Miguel Zubiri resigned on August 3, 2011, amid an on-going electoral protest.)	Lakas	1	2013	Majority	Malaybalay, Bukidnon

== House of Representatives ==
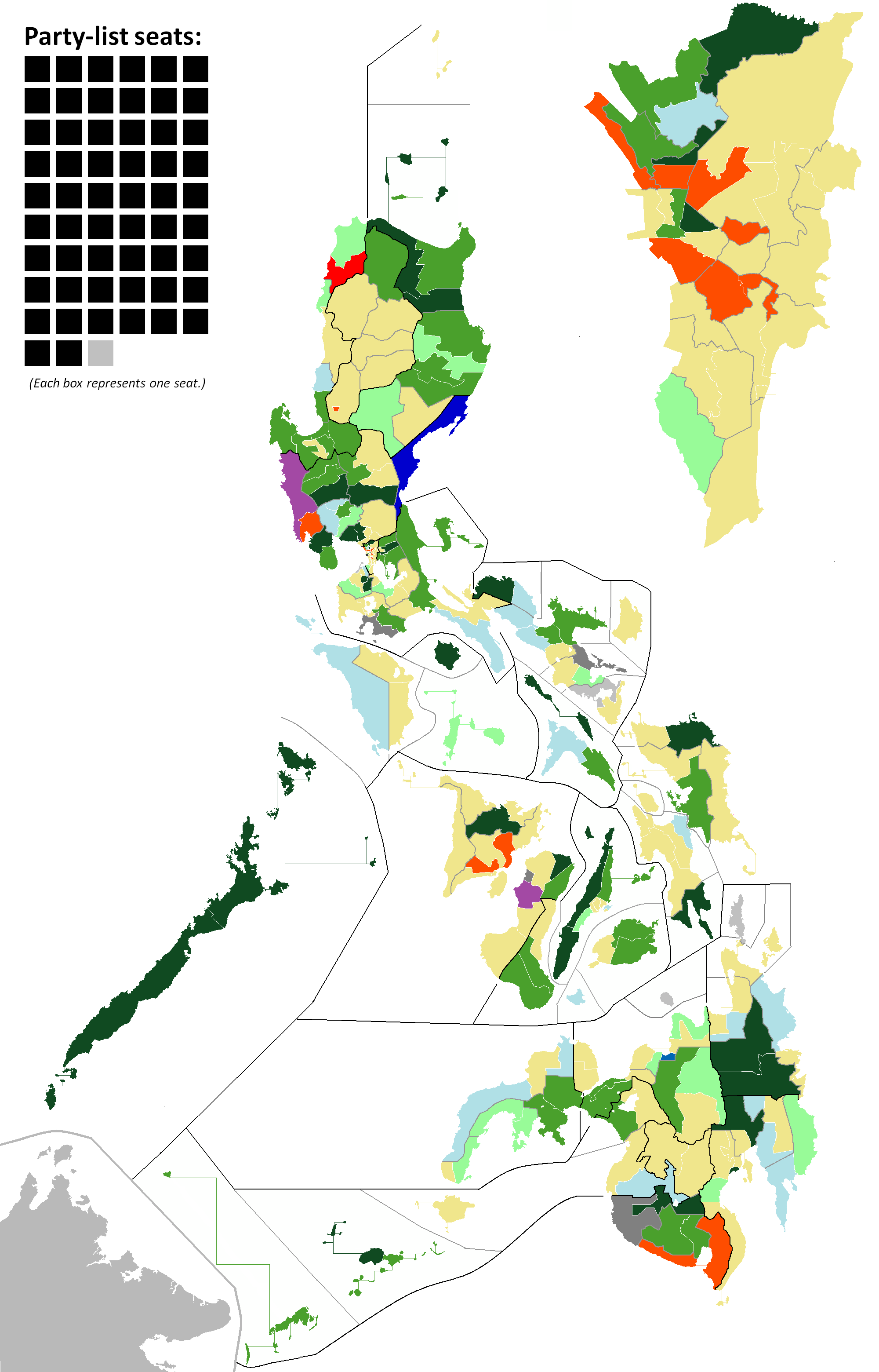
Final party standings.

Fifteenth Congress representation map of the Philippines

The term of office of the members of the House of Representatives will be from June 30, 2010, to June 30, 2013. The political party stated is the one that the member is currently a member of, which may be different from the one where the member ran under during the elections, or even from the one stated on the ballot.

Province/City	District	Representative	Party	Term	Bloc
Abra	Lone	Joy Bernos	Liberal (Note: Affiliated with the Partido Demokratiko Sosyalista ng Pilipinas at election.)	1	Majority
Agusan del Norte	1st	Jose Aquino II	Lakas	2	Minority
Agusan del Norte	2nd	Angelica Amante	Liberal (Note: Affiliated with Lakas–Kampi–CMD at election.)	1	Majority
Agusan del Sur	1st	Maria Valentina Plaza	NUP	1	Majority
Agusan del Sur	2nd	Evelyn Plaza-Mellana	NUP	1	Majority
Aklan	Lone	Florencio Miraflores	Liberal	3	Majority
Albay	1st	Edcel Lagman	Independent	3	Majority
Albay	2nd	Al Francis Bichara	Nacionalista	2	Majority
Albay	3rd	Fernando Gonzalez (Note: Fernando Gonzalez was disqualified by the Second Division of the Commission on Elections (COMELEC) on May 8, 2010, and by the COMELEC en banc on July 23, 2010. Gonzalez' disqualification was reversed by the Supreme Court on March 8, 2011.)	Liberal	1	Majority
Antipolo	1st	Roberto Puno	NUP	2	Majority
Antipolo	2nd	Romeo Acop	Liberal (Note: Independent at election.)	1	Majority
Antique	Lone	Paolo Everardo Javier	Liberal	1	Majority
Apayao	Lone	Eleanor Begtang	NPC	1	Majority
Aurora	Lone	Sonny Angara	LDP	3	Majority
Bacolod	Lone	Anthony Golez	Independent (Note: Affiliated with the Nationalist People's Coalition at election.)	1	Majority
Baguio	Lone	Bernardo Vergara	UNA	1	Majority
Basilan	Lone	Hadjiman Hataman Salliman	Liberal	1	Majority
Bataan	1st	Herminia Roman	Liberal	2	Majority
Bataan	2nd	Albert Garcia	NUP	3	Majority
Batanes	Lone	Henedina Abad	Liberal	1	Majority
Batangas	1st	Tomas Apacible	Liberal	1	Majority
Batangas	2nd	Hermilando Mandanas	Independent (Note: Affiliated with the Liberal Party at election.)	3	Majority
Batangas	3rd	Sonny Collantes	Liberal (Note: Affiliated with Pwersa ng Masang Pilipino at election.)	3	Majority
Batangas	4th	Mark Llandro Mendoza	NPC	2	Majority
Benguet	Lone	Ronald Cosalan	Liberal	1	Majority
Biliran	Lone	Rogelio Espina	Liberal (Note: Affiliated with the Nacionalista Party at election.)	1	Majority
Bohol	1st	Rene Relampagos	Liberal (Note: Affiliated with the Laban ng Demokratikong Pilipino at election.)	1	Majority
Bohol	2nd	Erico Aumentado (Note: Erico Aumentado died on December 25, 2012.)	NPC	1	Minority
Bohol	3rd	Arthur C. Yap	NPC	1	Minority
Bukidnon	1st	Jesus Emmanuel Paras	NPC	1	Majority
Bukidnon	2nd	Florencio Flores Jr.	Nacionalista	1	Majority
Bukidnon	3rd	Jose Zubiri III	BPP	2	Majority
Bulacan	1st	Victoria Sy-Alvarado	NUP	2	Majority
Bulacan	2nd	Pedro Pancho	NUP	3	Majority
Bulacan	3rd	Jonjon Mendoza	Liberal	1	Majority
Bulacan	4th	Linabelle Villarica	Liberal	1	Majority
Cagayan	1st	Jack Enrile	NPC	1	Majority
Cagayan	2nd	Florencio Vargas (Note: Florencio Vargas died on July 22, 2010.)	Lakas	3	—
Cagayan	2nd	Baby Alfonso (Note: Baby Alfonso was elected on March 12, 2011, to succeed Florencio Vargas. She took office on March 16, 2011.)	NUP	1	Majority
Cagayan	3rd	Randolph Ting	NUP	1	Majority
Cagayan de Oro	1st	Jose Benjamin Benaldo	Nacionalista	1	Majority
Cagayan de Oro	2nd	Rufus Rodriguez	CDP	2	Majority
Caloocan	1st	Oscar Malapitan	UNA	3	Majority
Caloocan	2nd	Mitch Cajayon-Uy	NUP	2	Majority
Camarines Norte	1st	Renato Unico Jr.	NUP	1	Majority
Camarines Norte	2nd	Elmer Panotes	Lakas	1	Minority
Camarines Sur	1st	Rolando Andaya Jr.	Lakas	1	Majority
Camarines Sur	2nd	Dato Arroyo	Lakas	2	Minority
Camarines Sur	3rd	Luis Villafuerte	NPC	3	Majority
Camarines Sur	4th	Arnulfo Fuentebella	NPC	3	Majority
Camarines Sur	5th	Salvio Fortuno	Liberal	1	Majority
Camiguin	Lone	Pedro Romualdo (Note: Pedro Romualdo died on April 24, 2013.)	NPC	2	Majority
Capiz	1st	Antonio del Rosario	Liberal	2	Majority
Capiz	2nd	Jane Castro	NUP	1	Majority
Catanduanes	Lone	Cesar Sarmiento	Liberal	1	Majority
Cavite	1st	Jun Abaya (Note: Jun Abaya resigned on October 18, 2012, upon being appointed as Secretary of Transportation and Communications.)	Liberal	3	Majority
Cavite	2nd	Lani Mercado	Lakas	1	Minority
Cavite	3rd	Ayong Maliksi	Liberal	1	Majority
Cavite	4th	Elpidio Barzaga Jr.	NUP	2	Majority
Cavite	5th	Roy Loyola	Liberal	1	Majority
Cavite	6th	Antonio Ferrer	NUP	1	Majority
Cavite	7th	Jesus Crispin Remulla	Nacionalista	3	Majority
Cebu	1st	Eduardo Gullas	Nacionalista	3	Majority
Cebu	2nd	Pablo P. Garcia	NUP	2	Majority
Cebu	3rd	Pablo John Garcia	NUP	2	Majority
Cebu	4th	Benhur Salimbangon	NUP	2	Majority
Cebu	5th	Ramon Durano VI	BAKUD	3	Majority
Cebu	6th	Luigi Quisumbing	Liberal	1	Majority
Cebu City	1st	Rachel del Mar	Liberal	1	Majority
Cebu City	2nd	Tomas Osmeña	Liberal	1	Majority
Compostela Valley	1st	Maricar Zamora	Liberal	1	Majority
Compostela Valley	2nd	Rommel Amatong	Liberal	2	Majority
Cotabato	1st	Jesus Sacdalan	Liberal	1	Majority
Cotabato	2nd	Nancy Catamco	Liberal	1	Majority
Davao City	1st	Karlo Nograles	NUP	1	Majority
Davao City	2nd	Mylene Garcia-Albano	Liberal	1	Majority
Davao City	3rd	Isidro Ungab	Liberal	2	Majority
Davao del Norte	1st	Antonio Rafael del Rosario	Liberal	1	Majority
Davao del Norte	2nd	Antonio Lagdameo Jr.	NUP	2	Majority
Davao del Sur	1st	Marc Douglas Cagas IV	Nacionalista	2	Minority
Davao del Sur	2nd	Franklin Bautista	Liberal	2	Majority
Davao Oriental	1st	Nelson Dayanghirang Sr.	Nacionalista	2	Majority
Davao Oriental	2nd	Thelma Almario	Lakas	2	Majority
Dinagat Islands (Note: The creation of the Dinagat Islands was declared unconstitutional by the Supreme Court on February 11, 2010, and the province was reverted to Surigao del Norte. However, the Supreme Court reversed its decision on April 13, 2011, and restored the Dinagat Islands as a province, along with its representative.)	Lone	Ruben Ecleo Jr. (Note: Ruben Ecleo Jr. was removed on May 22, 2012, after the Supreme Court upheld his conviction for graft.)	Lakas	1	Majority
Eastern Samar	Lone	Ben Evardone	Liberal	1	Majority
Guimaras	Lone	JC Rahman Nava	Liberal	2	Majority
Ifugao	Lone	Teddy Baguilat	Liberal	1	Majority
Iligan	Lone	Vicente Belmonte Jr.	Liberal	2	Majority
Ilocos Norte	1st	Rodolfo Fariñas	Nacionalista	1	Majority
Ilocos Norte	2nd	Imelda Marcos	KBL	1	Majority
Ilocos Sur	1st	Ronald Singson (Note: Ronald Singson resigned on March 7, 2011, after being convicted for drug possession in Hong Kong.)	Nacionalista	2	Majority
Ilocos Sur	1st	Ryan Luis Singson (Note: Ryan Luis Singson was elected on May 28, 2011, to succeed Ronald Singson. He took office on May 30, 2011.)	Nacionalista (Note: Affiliated with the Bileg Party at election.)	1	Majority
Ilocos Sur	2nd	Eric Singson Jr.	Liberal	1	Majority
Iloilo	1st	Janette Garin	Liberal	3	Majority
Iloilo	2nd	Augusto Syjuco Jr.	UNA	1	Minority
Iloilo	3rd	Arthur Defensor Jr.	Liberal	1	Majority
Iloilo	4th	Ferjenel Biron	UNA	3	Majority
Iloilo	5th	Niel Tupas Jr.	Liberal	2	Majority
Iloilo City	Lone	Jerry Treñas	Liberal	1	Majority
Isabela	1st	Rodolfo Albano Jr.	NPC	1	Minority
Isabela	2nd	Anna Cristina Go	Nacionalista	1	Majority
Isabela	3rd	Napoleon Dy	NPC	1	Majority
Isabela	4th	Giorgidi Aggabao	NPC	2	Majority
Kalinga	Lone	Manuel Agyao	Liberal	2	Majority
La Union	1st	Victor Ortega	Lakas	2	Majority
La Union	2nd	Eufranio Eriguel	NPC	1	Majority
Laguna	1st	Dan Fernandez	Liberal	2	Majority
Laguna	2nd	Timmy Chipeco	Liberal	3	Majority
Laguna	3rd	Evita Arago	Liberal	2	Majority
Laguna	4th	Edgar San Luis	Liberal (Note: npc)	2	Majority
Lanao del Norte	1st	Imelda Dimaporo	NPC	1	Minority
Lanao del Norte	2nd	Fatimah Aliah Dimaporo	NPC	1	Minority
Lanao del Sur	1st	Mohammed Hussein Pangandaman	Independent	1	Minority
Lanao del Sur	2nd	Pangalian Balindong	Liberal	2	Majority
Lapu-Lapu City	Lone	Arturo Radaza	Lakas	1	Minority
Las Piñas	Lone	Mark Villar	Nacionalista	1	Majority
Leyte	1st	Martin Romualdez	Lakas	2	Minority
Leyte	2nd	Sergio Apostol	Liberal	1	Majority
Leyte	3rd	Andres Salvacion Jr.	Liberal	2	Majority
Leyte	4th	Lucy Torres-Gomez (Note: Lucy Torres-Gomez was removed by the Supreme Court on March 19, 2013, after an electoral protest.)	Liberal	1	Majority
Leyte	5th	Jose Carlos Cari	Liberal	1	Majority
Maguindanao	1st	Bai Sandra Sema	Liberal	1	Majority
Maguindanao	2nd	Simeon Datumanong	Lakas	3	Minority
Makati	1st	Monique Lagdameo	UNA (Note: Affiliated with PDP–Laban at election.)	1	Majority
Makati	2nd	Abigail Binay	UNA	2	Majority
Malabon	Lone	Josephine Lacson-Noel	NPC	2	Majority
Mandaluyong	Lone	Neptali Gonzales II	Liberal	2	Majority
Manila	1st	Benjamin Asilo	Liberal	2	Majority
Manila	2nd	Carlo Lopez	Liberal	1	Majority
Manila	3rd	Zenaida Angping	NPC	2	Majority
Manila	4th	Trisha Bonoan-David	NUP	2	Majority
Manila	5th	Amado Bagatsing	KABAKA	2	Majority
Manila	6th	Rosenda Ann Ocampo	Liberal	2	Majority
Marikina	1st	Marcelino Teodoro	Liberal	2	Majority
Marikina	2nd	Miro Quimbo	Liberal	1	Majority
Marinduque	Lone	Lord Allan Velasco	NUP	1	Majority
Masbate	1st	Narciso Bravo Jr.	NUP	3	Majority
Masbate	2nd	Antonio Kho	Lakas	2	Majority
Masbate	3rd	Scott Davies Lanete	NPC	1	Majority
Misamis Occidental	1st	Jorge Almonte	Liberal	1	Majority
Misamis Occidental	2nd	Loreto Ocampos	Liberal	1	Majority
Misamis Oriental	1st	Peter Unabia	Liberal	1	Majority
Misamis Oriental	2nd	Yevgeny Emano	Nacionalista	2	Majority
Mountain Province	Lone	Maximo Dalog	Liberal	1	Majority
Muntinlupa	Lone	Rodolfo Biazon	Liberal	1	Majority
Navotas	Lone	Toby Tiangco	UNA (Note: Affiliated with Partido Navoteño at election.)	1	Independent
Negros Occidental	1st	Jules Ledesma	NPC	2	Majority
Negros Occidental	2nd	Alfredo Marañon III	NUP	3	Majority
Negros Occidental	3rd	Albee Benitez	Liberal	1	Majority
Negros Occidental	4th	Jeffrey Ferrer	UNeGA	2	Majority
Negros Occidental	5th	Iggy Arroyo (Note: Iggy Arroyo died on January 26, 2012.)	Lakas	3	Minority
Negros Occidental	5th	Alejandro Mirasol (Note: Alejandro Mirasol was elected on June 2, 2012, to succeed Iggy Arroyo. He took office on June 4, 2012.)	Liberal	1	Majority
Negros Occidental	6th	Mercedes Alvarez	NPC	1	Majority
Negros Oriental	1st	Jocelyn Sy-Limkaichong	Liberal	2	Majority
Negros Oriental	2nd	George Arnaiz	NPC	2	Majority
Negros Oriental	3rd	Pryde Henry Teves	NPC	2	Majority
Northern Samar	1st	Raul Daza	Liberal	1	Majority
Northern Samar	2nd	Emil Ong	NUP	2	Majority
Nueva Ecija	1st	Josefina Joson	NPC	1	Majority
Nueva Ecija	2nd	Joseph Gilbert Violago	Liberal	2	Majority
Nueva Ecija	3rd	Czarina Umali	Liberal	2	Majority
Nueva Ecija	4th	Rodolfo Antonino	NUP	3	Majority
Nueva Vizcaya	Lone	Carlos Padilla	Nacionalista	2	Minority
Occidental Mindoro	Lone	Girlie Villarosa	Lakas	3	Majority
Oriental Mindoro	1st	Rodolfo Valencia	Liberal	3	Majority
Oriental Mindoro	2nd	Reynaldo Umali	Liberal	1	Majority
Palawan	1st	Antonio Alvarez	NUP	3	Majority
Palawan	2nd	Victorino Dennis Socrates	NUP	1	Majority
Pampanga	1st	Carmelo Lazatin Sr.	Lakas	2	Minority
Pampanga	2nd	Gloria Macapagal Arroyo	Lakas	1	Minority
Pampanga	3rd	Aurelio Gonzales Jr.	NPC	2	Majority
Pampanga	4th	Anna York Bondoc	Nacionalista	3	Majority
Pangasinan	1st	Jesus Celeste	NPC	1	Majority
Pangasinan	2nd	Leopoldo Bataoil	NPC	1	Majority
Pangasinan	3rd	Maria Rachel Arenas	Liberal	2	Majority
Pangasinan	4th	Gina de Venecia	NPC	1	Majority
Pangasinan	5th	Carmen Cojuangco	NPC	1	Majority
Pangasinan	6th	Marlyn Primicias-Agabas	NPC	1	Majority
Parañaque	1st	Edwin Olivarez	Liberal	1	Majority
Parañaque	2nd	Roilo Golez	Liberal	3	Majority
Pasay	Lone	Emi Rubiano	Liberal	1	Majority
Pasig	Lone	Roman Romulo	Liberal	2	Majority
Quezon	1st	Mark Enverga	NPC	2	Majority
Quezon	2nd	Irvin Alcala	Liberal	1	Majority
Quezon	3rd	Danilo Suarez	Lakas	3	Minority
Quezon	4th	Erin Tañada	Liberal	3	Majority
Quezon City	1st	Vincent Crisologo	UNA	3	Majority
Quezon City	2nd	Winston Castelo	Liberal	1	Majority
Quezon City	3rd	Jorge Banal Jr.	Liberal	1	Majority
Quezon City	4th	Feliciano Belmonte Jr.	Liberal	1	Majority
Quirino	Lone	Dakila Cua	Liberal	1	Majority
Rizal	1st	Joel Duavit	NPC	1	Majority
Rizal	2nd	Isidro Rodriguez Jr.	NPC	1	Majority
Romblon	Lone	Eleandro Jesus Madrona	Nacionalista	2	Majority
Samar	1st	Mel Senen Sarmiento	Liberal	1	Majority
Samar	2nd	Milagrosa Tan	NPC	1	Majority
San Jose del Monte	Lone	Arthur Robes	Liberal	2	Majority
San Juan	Lone	JV Ejercito	UNA	1	Majority
Sarangani	Lone	Manny Pacquiao	UNA (Note: Affiliated with the People's Champ Movement at election.)	1	Majority
Siquijor	Lone	Orlando Fua	Lakas	2	Minority
Sorsogon	1st	Salvador Escudero (Note: Salvador Escudero died on August 13, 2012.)	Liberal	2	Majority
Sorsogon	2nd	Deogracias Ramos Jr.	Liberal	1	Majority
South Cotabato	1st	Pedro Acharon Jr.	NPC	1	Majority
South Cotabato	2nd	Daisy Avance Fuentes	NPC	1	Majority
Southern Leyte	Lone	Roger Mercado	NUP	3	Majority
Sultan Kudarat	1st	Raden Sakaluran	Independent	1	Majority
Sultan Kudarat	2nd	Arnulfo Go	NUP	2	Majority
Sulu	1st	Tupay Loong	NUP	1	Majority
Sulu	2nd	Nur-Ana Sahidulla	NPC	1	Majority
Surigao del Norte	1st	Francisco Matugas	Liberal	2	Majority
Surigao del Norte	2nd	Guillermo Romarate Jr.	Liberal	2	Majority
Surigao del Sur	1st	Philip Pichay	Lakas	2	Minority
Surigao del Sur	2nd	Florencio Garay	Liberal	2	Majority
Taguig–Pateros	1st	Arnel Cerafica	Liberal	1	Majority
Taguig	2nd	Sigfrido Tiñga	Liberal	1	Majority
Tarlac	1st	Henry Cojuangco	NPC	1	Majority
Tarlac	2nd	Susan Yap	NPC	1	Majority
Tarlac	3rd	Jeci Lapus	NUP	2	Majority
Tawi-Tawi	Lone	Nur Jaafar	NPC	3	Majority
Valenzuela	1st	Rex Gatchalian	NPC	2	Majority
Valenzuela	2nd	Magi Gunigundo	Lakas	2	Majority
Zambales	1st	Mitos Magsaysay	UNA	3	Majority
Zambales	2nd	Antonio Diaz (Note: Antonio Diaz died on August 3, 2011.)	LM	3	Majority
Zambales	2nd	Hermogenes Omar Ebdane III (Note: Hermogenes Omar Ebdane III was elected on February 4, 2012, to succeed Antonio Diaz. He took office on February 6, 2012.)	SZP (Note: Affiliated with Lapiang Manggagawa at election.)	1	Majority
Zamboanga City	1st	Beng Climaco	Liberal	2	Majority
Zamboanga City	2nd	Erbie Fabian	Nacionalista	3	Majority
Zamboanga del Norte	1st	Bullet Jalosjos	Nacionalista	1	Majority
Zamboanga del Norte	2nd	Rosendo Labadlabad	Liberal	2	Majority
Zamboanga del Norte	3rd	Cesar Jalosjos	Nacionalista	3	Majority
Zamboanga del Sur	1st	Victor Yu	NPC	2	Majority
Zamboanga del Sur	2nd	Aurora E. Cerilles	NPC	1	Majority
Zamboanga Sibugay	1st	Jonathan Yambao	Nacionalista	1	Majority
Zamboanga Sibugay	2nd	Jon-jon Jalosjos	Nacionalista	1	Majority
Party-list		Reena Concepcion Obillo	1 Ang Pamilya	1	Minority
Party-list		Salvador Cabaluna III	1-CARE	1	Majority
Party-list		Michael Angelo Rivera	1-CARE	1	Majority
Party-list		Homero Mercado (Note: Homero Mercado resigned on May 29, 2012.)	1-UTAK	1	Majority
Party-list		Zenaida Maranan (Note: Zenaida Maranan took office on October 9, 2012, to succeed Homer Mercado.)	1-UTAK	0	Majority
Party-list		Mariano Piamonte Jr.	A Teacher	2	Majority
Party-list		Julieta Cortuna	A Teacher	1	Majority
Party-list		Solaiman Pangandaman (Note: Solaiman Pangandaman resigned on July 13, 2011.)	AA-Kasosyo	1	Minority
Party-list		Nasser Pangandaman (Note: Nasser Pangandaman took office on July 22, 2011, to succeed Solaiman Pangandaman.)	AA-Kasosyo	0	Minority
Party-list		Sharon Garin	AAMBIS-Owa	1	Majority
Party-list		Maximo Rodriguez Jr.	Abamin	1	Majority
Party-list		Robert Raymond Estrella	Abono	2	Majority
Party-list		Francisco Ortega III	Abono	1	Majority
Party-list		Catalina Leonen-Pizarro	ABS	1	Majority
Party-list		Antonio Tinio	ACT Teachers	1	Majority
Party-list		Nicanor Briones	AGAP	2	Majority
Party-list		Patricio Antonio	Agbiag	1	Majority
Party-list		Angelo Palmones	AGHAM	1	Majority
Party-list		Mikey Arroyo	AGP	3	Minority
Party-list		Christopher Co	AKB	1	
Party-list		Rodel Batocabe	AKB	1	
Party-list		Alfredo Garbin Jr.	AKB	1	
Party-list		Walden Bello	Akbayan	1	Majority
Party-list		Kaka Bag-ao	Akbayan	1	Majority
Party-list		Rodante Marcoleta	Alagad	3	Majority
Party-list		Wes Gatchalian	Alay Buhay	1	Majority
Party-list		Catalina Bagasina	ALE	1	Minority
Party-list		Acmad Tomawis	ALIF	3	Majority
Party-list		Bem Noel	An Waray	3	Majority
Party-list		Neil Benedict Montejo	An Waray	1	Majority
Party-list		Pastor Alcover Jr.	ANAD	1	Minority
Party-list		Rafael V. Mariano	Anakpawis	1	Majority
Party-list		Teodorico Haresco Jr.	Ang Kasangga	1	Majority
Party-list		Ponciano Payuyo	APEC	1	Majority
Party-list		Daryl Grace Abayon	AT	1	Majority
Party-list		Isidro Lico	Ating Koop	1	Majority
Party-list		Eulogio Magsaysay	AVE	1	Majority
Party-list		Teodoro Casiño	Bayan Muna	3	Majority
Party-list		Neri Colmenares	Bayan Muna	1	Majority
Party-list		Bernadette Herrera	BH	1	Majority
Party-list		Irwin Tieng	Buhay	2	Majority
Party-list		Mike Velarde Jr.	Buhay	1	Majority
Party-list		Agapito Guanlao	Butil	1	Majority
Party-list		Cinchona Cruz-Gonzales	CIBAC	2	Majority
Party-list		Sherwin Tugna	CIBAC	1	Majority
Party-list		Cresente Paez	Coop-NATCCO	1	Majority
Party-list		Jose Ping-ay	Coop-NATCCO	2	Majority
Party-list		Emmeline Aglipay-Villar	DIWA	1	Majority
Party-list		Luzviminda Ilagan	Gabriela	2	Majority
Party-list		Emmi de Jesus	Gabriela	1	Majority
Party-list		Raymond Palatino	Kabataan	2	Majority
Party-list		Ranulfo Canonigo	Kakusa	1	Majority
Party-list		Abigail Faye Ferriol	Kalinga	1	Majority
Party-list		Arnel Ty	LPGMA	1	Majority
Party-list		Mark Aeron Sambar	PBA	1	Majority
Party-list		Godofredo Arquiza	Senior Citizens	1	Majority
Party-list		David Kho (Note: David Kho resigned on December 31, 2011, but was denied by the Commission on Elections.)	Senior Citizens	1	Majority
Party-list		Raymond Mendoza	TUCP	1	Majority
Party-list		Carol Jane Lopez	YACAP	2	Majority

== Changes ==
These are the changes in membership after the proclamation of winners:

=== Senate ===
A vacant seat can only be filled up on a special election held on the day of the next regular election.

Term ending	Party	Former senator	Left office	Cause	Party	New senator	Took office
2013	Liberal	Benigno Aquino III	June 29, 2010	Elected president	To be filled at the next Senate election.		
2013	Independent	Migz Zubiri	August 3, 2011	Resignation	PDP–Laban	Koko Pimentel	August 15, 2011

=== House of Representatives ===
- For representatives elected via legislative districts, a special election will be called to determine the successor unless the vacancy occurred a year before the next regular election.
- For sectoral representatives, the next person on the list will take office.

Seat	Party	Former representative	Left office	Cause	Special election	Party	New representative	Took office
Cagayan–2nd	Lakas–Kampi	Florencio Vargas	July 22, 2010	Death	March 12, 2011	Lakas–Kampi	Baby Aline Vargas-Alfonso	March 16, 2011
Ilocos Sur–1st	Lakas–Kampi	Ronald Singson	March 7, 2011	Resignation	May 28, 2011	Biled	Ryan Singson	May 30, 2011
Party-list	AA-Kasosyo	Solaiman Pangandaman	July 13, 2011	Resignation	None	AA-Kasosyo	Nasser Pangandaman	July 25, 2011
Zambales–2nd	LM	Antonio M. Diaz	August 3, 2011	Death	February 4, 2012	LM	Omar Ebdane	February 13, 2012
Party-list	Senior Citizens	David Kho	December 31, 2011	Resignation	None	Denied by the Commission on Elections.		
Negros Occidental–5th	Lakas–Kampi	Iggy Arroyo	January 26, 2012	Death	June 2, 2012	Liberal	Alejandro Mirasol	June 4, 2012
Party-list	1-UTAK	Homero Mercado	May 29, 2012	Resignation	None	1-UTAK	Zenaida de Castro	October 9, 2012
Dinagat Islands	Lakas	Ruben Ecleo, Jr.	May 31, 2012	Dropped from the rolls	None			
Sorsogon–1st	Liberal	Salvador Escudero	August 13, 2012	Death	None			
Cavite–1st	Liberal	Joseph Emilio Abaya	October 18, 2012	Sworn in as DOTC secretary	None			
Bohol–2nd	NPC	Erico B. Aumentado	December 25, 2012	Death	None			
Leyte–4th	Liberal	Lucy Torres-Gomez	March 19, 2013	Ordered removed by the Supreme Court	None			
Camiguin	Lakas	Pedro Romualdo	April 24, 2013	Death	None			

== Vacancies ==
These are the vacant seats in Congress:

- Senate (1):
  - The seat of Benigno Aquino III who gave it up after being elected president in 2010. It will remain vacant the term expires, as special elections for vacated Senate seats can only be scheduled on the next regular election.
- House of Representatives (5):
  - The seat for 2nd district of Bohol after Erico B. Aumentado died. No special election was held.
  - The seat for 1st district of Cavite after Joseph Emilio Abaya was sworn in Secretary of Transportation and Communications. No special election was held.
  - The seat for lone district of Dinagat Islands after Ruben Ecleo was removed from the rolls. No special election was held.
  - The seat for 1st district of Sorsogon after Salvador Escudero died. No special election was held.
  - The seat for lone district of Camiguin after Pedro Romualdo died. No special election was held.
  - One seat of the Coalition of Associations of Senior Citizens in the Philippines, Inc. after David Kho resigned. The Commission on Elections forbade the party from calling up the 4th person from the list after the 3rd person from the list, who was ejected from the party, protested, and that Kho revealed it was a part of a term-sharing agreement, in which the commission has prohibited.
