= Aumentado =

Aumentado is a surname. Notable people with the surname include:

- Erico Aumentado (1940–2012), Filipino journalist, lawyer, and politician
- Erico Aristotle Aumentado (born 1977), Filipino businessman and politician, son of Erico
