= 2012 Zambales's 2nd congressional district special election =

2012 special election at Zambales's 2nd congressional district
- February 4, 2012

Zambales's 2nd congressional district
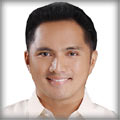

Candidate	Jun Omar Ebdane	Cheryl Delloso-Montalla	Rica Victoria Diaz-Arambulo
Party	LM	Liberal	Nacionalista
Popular vote	62,867	56,945	17,291
Percentage	44.13	39.97	12.14
Representative before election
Antonio Diaz
LM
Representative-elect
Jun Omar Ebdane
LM

A special election (known elsewhere as "by-elections") for Zambales's 2nd congressional district seat in the House of Representatives of the Philippines was held on February 4, 2012. The special election was called after incumbent representative Antonio Diaz died on August 3, 2011. Jun Omar Ebdane, son of Zambales governor Hermogenes Ebdane, won in the special election, beating Cheryl Deloso-Montalla, Diaz's opponent in the 2010 general election, Rica Victoria Diaz-Arambulo, Diaz's daughter, and two other independent candidates. Ebdane served out the remainder of Diaz's unfinished term during the 15th Congress until June 30, 2013.

This was the closest special election in the 21st century in the Philippines.

== Electoral system ==
The House of Representatives is elected via parallel voting system, with 80% of seats elected from congressional districts, and 20% from the party-list system. Each district sends one representative to the House of Representatives. An election to the seat is via first-past-the-post, in which the candidate with the most votes, whether or not one has a majority, wins the seat.

Based on Republic Act (RA) No. 6645, in order for a special election to take place, the seat must be vacated, the relevant chamber notifies the Commission on Elections (COMELEC) the existence of a vacancy, then the COMELEC schedules the special election. There is a dispute in the procedure as a subsequent law, RA No. 7166, supposedly amended the procedure, bypassing the need for official communication from the relevant chamber of the vacancy. The COMELEC has always waited on official communication from the relevant chamber before scheduling a special election.

Meanwhile, according to RA No. 8295, should only one candidate file to run in the special election, the COMELEC will declare that candidate as the winner and will no longer hold the election.

== Background ==
A member of the Magsaysay political family has served as member of the House of Representatives from Zambales since 1946 when Ramon Magsaysay was elected. Antonio Diaz, a nephew of Ramon Magsaysay, was first elected as representative in Zambales' lone district in 1969, serving until 1972 when Congress was dissolved, elected in 1984 in the Regular Batasang Pambansa, won three consecutive terms starting in 1992 for the 2nd District's seat, and another three consecutive terms starting in 2004. Diaz died on August 3, 2011, after being afflicted with pneumonia.

With the seat's vacancy, the Zambales Provincial Board passed a resolution asking the House of Representatives and the Commission on Elections to call for a special election. The absence of a representative meant that the monetary incentives normally used by Diaz for scholarships was no longer given. By September, the resolution filed by the provincial board was at its second reading in the House of Representatives, and that the board passed another resolution asking Speaker Feliciano Belmonte, Jr. to appoint a liaison officer to the district coming from the province. Vice Governor Ramon Lacbain said that the board is expecting the special election to be held at October. By October, typhoons Pedring and Quiel ravaged the province; with no representative in Congress, the residents had no one to approach for help. The Commission on Elections released a statement on November 8 that expecting the special election to be held soon.

On December, the commission announced that the special election would be held on February 4. The election period would start on December 21, 2011, and end on February 14, 2012, the filing of certificates of candidacy was from January 16 to January 18, 2012, and the campaign period was from January 19 to February 2, 2012.

Names floated prior to the filing of certificates of candidacies include Rica Diaz, daughter of Diaz, Cheryl Deloso, daughter of former governor Amor Deloso, Jun Omar Ebdane, son of current governor Hermogenes Ebdane and incumbent provincial administrator, and board members Wilfredo Pangan and Alfred Mendoza.

== Candidates ==
1. Cheryl Deloso-Montalla (Liberal)
2. Rica Victoria Diaz-Arambulo (Nacionalista)
3. Jun Omar Ebdane (Lapiang Manggagawa), provincial administrator of Zambales
4. Alfred Mendoza (independent), former Zambales Provincial Board member from the 2nd district
5. Wilfredo Paul Pangan (independent), former Zambales Provincial Board member from the 2nd district

== Campaign ==
President Benigno Aquino III authorized the military and the police to implement election laws, such as a province-wide gun ban, during the election period. Jun Omar Ebdane resigned as provincial administrator on January 17 in order to run for the vacant seat. Ebdane was leading in election surveys, with 37% of the vote, followed closely by Deloso-Montalla and Diaz-Arambulo. Meanwhile, Diaz-Arambulo has succeeded in allowing her father's scholarships to continue while the seat was vacant, working with Belmonte, who was officer-in-charge of the vacant seat.

The commission issued a warning on the Ebdane and Deloso-Montalla campaigns, saying that the posters used were too large than the legally-specified size. Ebdane's supporters took down huge billboards of him in Iba, while a few of Deloso-Montalla's posters were also removed. This comes as President Aquino declared February 4 as a special non-working holiday in the province to allow the electorate to vote. The commission expected a voter turnout of around 70%, while Diaz-Arambulo has complained of vote buying.

On the eve of the election, a shootout between Zambales police and armed men took place at Botolan. It started when an informant called the police saying a group of armed men were harassing voters in barangay Mambog; a special reaction team of Botolan police went to the scene, but one of the gunmen named Cesar Mado opened fire to the police. The police returned fire, causing the death of Madu, a former policeman, and 10 more were injured. Governor Ebdane said that he will not interfere in the investigation, although a Philippine Star source stated that Madu was a former security officer of the Delosos.

== Results ==
2012 Zambales's 2nd congressional district special election
Candidate	Party	Votes	%	+/–
Jun Omar Ebdane	Lapiang Manggagawa	62,867	44.13	−4.88
Cheryl Deloso-Montalla	Liberal Party	56,945	39.97	−5.68
Rica Victoria Diaz-Arambulo	Nacionalista Party	17,291	12.14	N/A
Wilfredo Paul Pangan	Independent	3,858	2.71	N/A
Alfred Mendoza	Independent	1,512	1.06	N/A
Total		142,473	100.00	–
Registered voters/turnout			70.95	−13.57
Majority		5,922	4.16	+0.81
Lapiang Manggagawa hold				

The Zambales board of canvassers started counting the votes on election night, but suspended its proceedings at around 10:00 pm to allow the election returns to arrive. The session resumed on morning the next day. The board finished its tally by 10:00 am but the documentation took more than hour to be finished; the board proclaimed Ebdane as the winner by 11:15 am. Ebdane won in seven municipalities, while Deloso-Montalla won Santa Cruz and San Narciso, and Diaz-Arambulo won narrowly in San Antonio. The Parish Pastoral Council for Responsible Voting, while noting the low turnout was due to voters residing in other areas of the country not returning to the district to vote, was dismayed by the rampant vote-buying.

== Aftermath ==
Deloso-Montalla defeated Ebdane in the 2013 general election. She then defended the seat in 2016 and 2019. With Cheryl term-limited, former governor Amor Deloso ran for the district's seat, while Cheryl ran for governor. Both lost, with Cheryl losing to Jun Omar's father and incumbent Hermogenes Ebdane, while Amor lost to Ebdane ally and Botolan mayor Doris Maniquiz.

== 2010 election result ==
2010 Philippine House of Representatives election at Zambales's 2nd district
Candidate	Party	Votes	%
Antonio Diaz	Lapiang Manggagawa	76,928	49.00
Cheryl Deloso-Montalla	Liberal Party	71,672	45.65
Alfred Mendoza	Lakas Kampi CMD	8,391	5.34
Total		156,991	100.00
Valid votes		156,991	92.50
Invalid/blank votes		12,725	7.50
Total votes		169,716	100.00
Majority		5,256	3.35
Lapiang Manggagawa hold			

== See also ==
- 1911 Zambales's congressional district special election
- 1914 Zambales's congressional district special election
