= 2019 Bohol local elections =

Philippine election

2019 Bohol gubernatorial election
- May 13, 2019
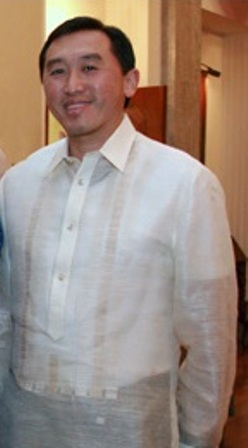

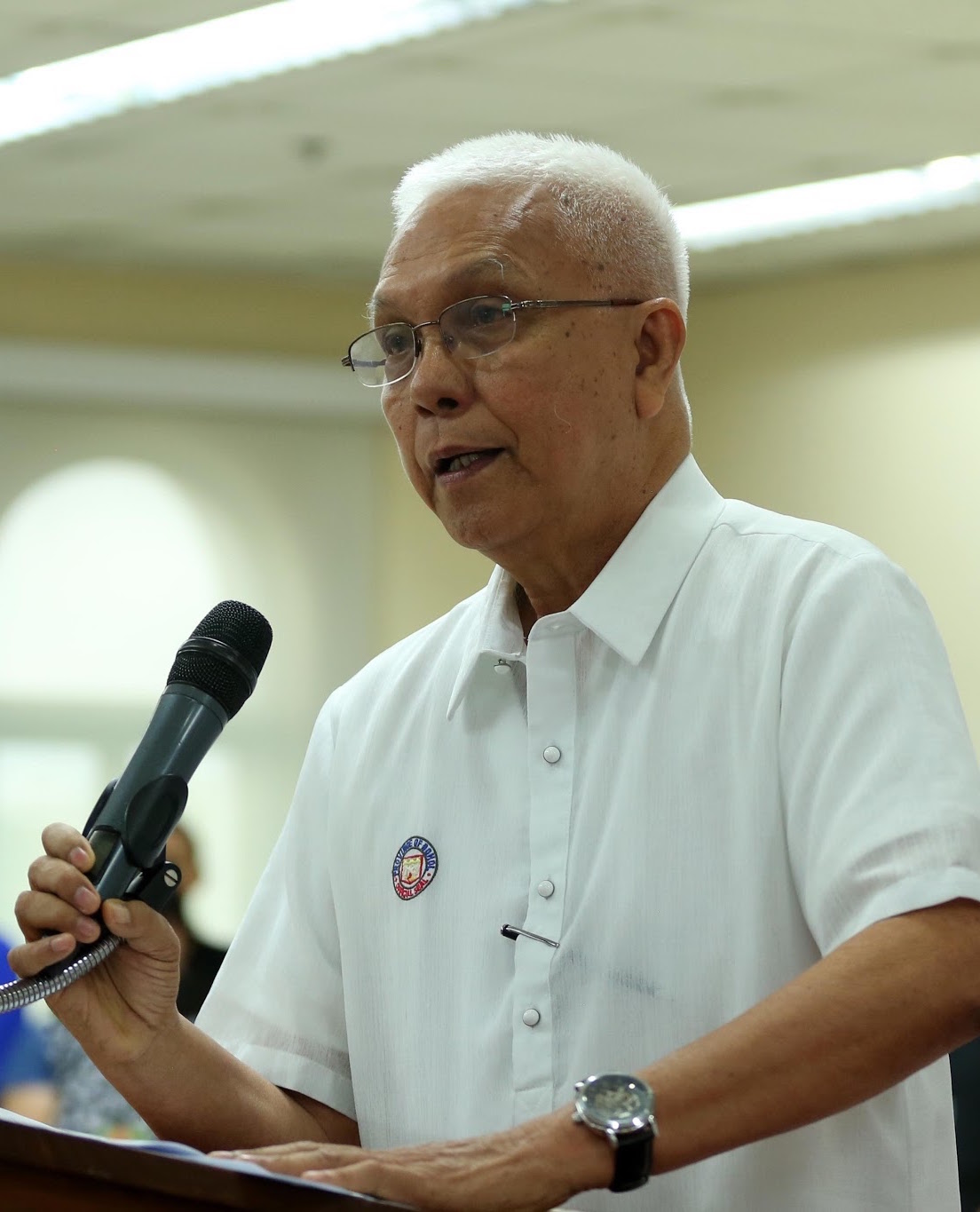

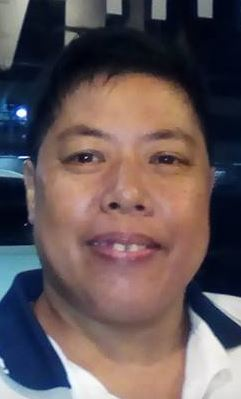

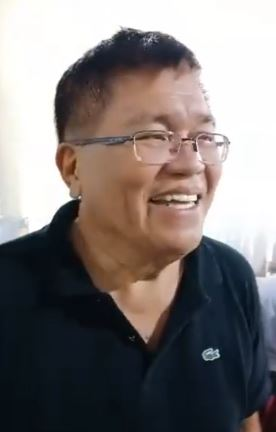

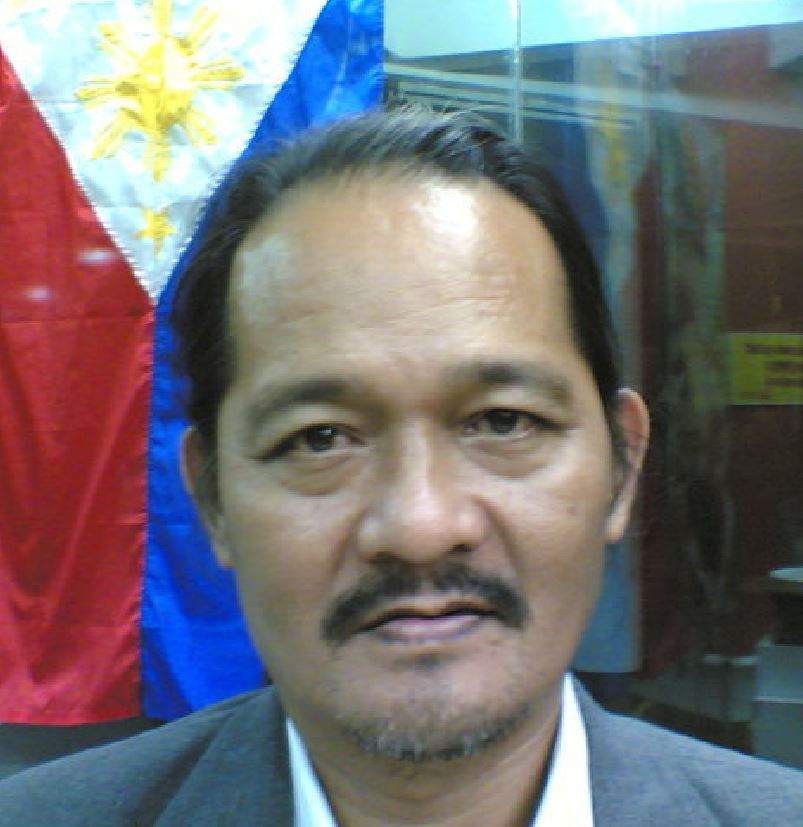
Nominee	Arthur Yap	Leoncio Evasco Jr.	Concepcion Flores
Party	PDP–Laban	NPC	Independent
Running mate	Rene Relampagos	Tomas Abapo Jr.
Popular vote	326,895	324,734	3,672
Percentage	49.65%	49.32%	0.56%
Nominee	Hercules Castillo	Roberto "Amay Bisaya" Reyes
Party	KKK	Independent
Popular vote	3,108	2,608
Percentage	0.47%	0.40%
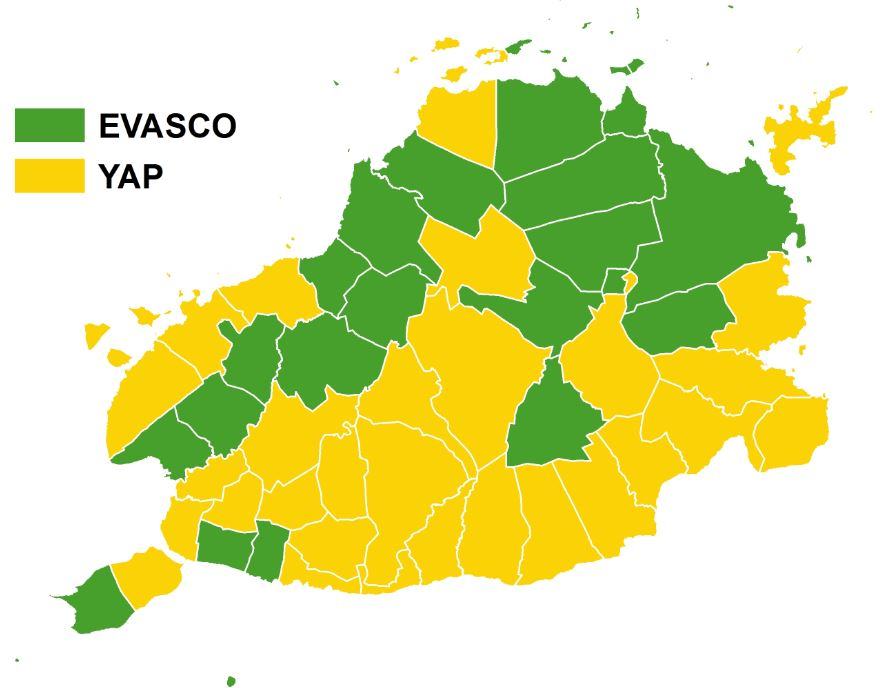
- Map showing the official results taken from city and municipal certificates of canvass.
Governor before election
Edgar Chatto
Liberal
Elected Governor
Arthur Yap
PDP–Laban

Bohol local elections was held last May 13, 2019 as part of the 2019 Philippine general election. Registered voters elected leaders for local positions: a city or town mayor, vice mayor and town councilors, as well as three to four members of the Sangguniang Panlalawigan, the vice-governor, governor and three representatives for the three districts of Bohol.

There is a 12.51% increase to the number of registered voters for the whole province by the end of COMELEC's nationwide registration deadline last September 28, 2018. This is equivalent to 99,914 new registered voters from 798,768 last 2016 election to a total of 898,682 for this election, becoming the 19th vote-rich province of the country.

At the end of the filing of certificates of candidacy last October 17, 2018, 46 hopefuls have filed their certificates of candidacy (COC) for 15 provincial elective positions. Based on the official list of provincial Commission on Elections, 5 aspirants ran for governor, 2 for vice-governors, 31 for provincial board members, and 8 for congressmen in three districts.

On May 16, 2019, Arthur C. Yap was proclaimed as the new governor of the province by the provincial board of canvassers edging a narrow margin from former cabinet secretary Leoncio Evasco.

== Provincial Election ==
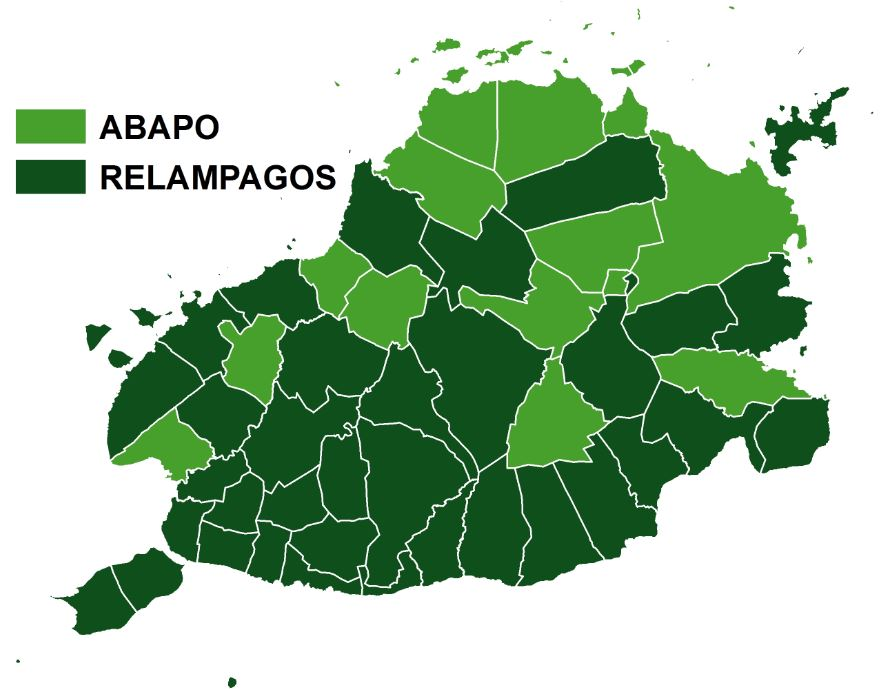
Vice-Gubernatorial Election results; refers to results from Bohol's city and municipalities.

=== Governor ===
Edgar Chatto is the incumbent but term-limited. He decided to regain his former post as representative of 1st District under Padayaon Bohol banner and was reinstated. Incumbent 3rd district congressman Arthur C. Yap is the official nominee of the ruling coalition. His major contender is the former Maribojoc mayor and Cabinet Secretary Leoncio Evasco Jr.

Bohol gubernatorial election
Party	Candidate	Votes	%
PDP–Laban	Arthur Yap	326,895	49.65%
NPC	Leoncio Evasco Jr.	324,734	49.32%
Independent	Concepcion Flores	3,672	0.56%
KKK	Hercules Castillo	3,108	0.47%
Independent	Roberto Reyes	2,608	0.40%
Total votes		658,409	100.00%
PDP–Laban gain from NPC			

=== Vice-Governor ===
Dionisio D. Balite is the incumbent but chose to run for representative of the 3rd district.

Bohol vice-gubernatorial election
Party	Candidate	Votes	%
NUP	Rene Relampagos	330,904	54.35%
NPC	Tomas Abapo Jr.	277,933	45.65%
Total votes		608,837	100.00%
NUP gain from NPC			

=== Sangguniang Panlalawigan ===
Party	Popular vote		Seats	
Party	Total	%	Total	%
NPC	635,669	39.87%	4	31%
PDP–Laban	240,305	15.07%	2	15%
NUP	230,584	14.46%	2	15%
Liberal	212,700	13.34%	2	15%
PFP	92,057	5.77%	0	0%
Nacionalista	18,587	1.17%	0	0%
Independent	164,340	10.31%	0	0%
Total	1,594,242	100%	10	77%

==== 1st District ====
- Electorate (2019): 291,593

Parties are as stated in their certificates of candidacy.

Bohol 1st District Sangguniang Panlalawigan election
Party	Candidate	Votes	%
Liberal	Aldner Damalerio	75,785	14.90%
Liberal	Ricky Masamayor	71,530	14.06%
NPC	Lucille Lagunay	65,497	12.87%
Liberal	Isabelito Tongco	65,385	12.85%
NPC	Dalia Melda Tirol-Magno	65,330	12.84%
NPC	Donald Sevilla	51,403	10.10%
PFP	Joahna Cabalit-Initay	49,022	9.64%
Nacionalista	Fabio Ontong Jr.	18,587	3.65%
Independent	Jose Nicanor Tocmo	17,731	3.49%
PFP	Ricfel Rebusa	14,138	2.78%
Independent	Isabelo Somontan	9,516	1.87%
Independent	Jose Mesina	4,812	0.95%
Total votes		508,736	100.00%

==== 2nd District ====
- Electorate (2019): 281,949

Parties are as stated in their certificates of candidacy.

Bohol 2nd District Sangguniang Panlalawigan election
Party	Candidate	Votes	%
NUP	Frans Gelaine Garcia	93,666	20.16%
NPC	Vierna Mae Boniel - Maglasang	75,215	16.19%
NUP	Restituto Auxtero	73,467	15.81%
NPC	Isidore Besas	69,718	15.01%
NUP	Giehrjem Puracan	63,451	13.66%
NPC	Gloria Gementiza	58,507	12.59%
Independent	Ammon Dennis Tirol	19,273	4.15%
Independent	Santos Abella	11,256	2.42%
Total votes		464,553	100.00%

==== 3rd District ====
- Electorate (2019): 304,044

Parties are as stated in their certificates of candidacy.

Bohol 3rd District Sangguniang Panlalawigan election
Party	Candidate	Votes	%
NPC	Dionisio Victor Balite	108,397	17.46%
PDP–Laban	Jane Jade Bautista	96,741	15.58%
NPC	Elipido Jala	65,269	10.51%
PDP–Laban	Elpidio Bonita	57,394	9.24%
Independent	Godofreda Tirol	44,150	7.11%
PDP–Laban	Crispina Ayag-Vergara	44,069	7.10%
PDP–Laban	Guillermo Espejo	42,101	6.78%
NPC	Mc Aldous Castañares	42,046	6.77%
Independent	Dominic Villafuerte	40,524	6.53%
NPC	Edwin Vallejos	34,287	5.52%
PFP	Nathaniel Binlod	28,897	4.65%
Independent	Noel Bongolto	17,078	2.75%
Total votes		620,953	100.00%

== Congressional Election Candidates ==
=== 1st District, Congressman ===
- City: Tagbilaran City
- Municipality: Alburquerque, Antequera, Baclayon, Balilihan, Calape, Catigbian, Corella, Cortes, Dauis, Loon, Maribojoc, Panglao, Sikatuna, Tubigon
- Population (2010): 415,420

Last termer Rene Relampagos is the incumbent. Incumbent governor Edgar Chatto is the ruling party's official nominee.

Philippine House of Representatives election at Bohol's 1st district
Party	Candidate	Votes	%
Liberal	Edgar Chatto	143,039	69.01%
NPC	Dan Neri Lim^{1}	64,242	30.99%
Total votes		207,281	100.00%
Liberal gain from NPC			

^1 Substituted his son Dan Ismael Lim (NPC)

.

=== 2nd District, Congressman ===
- City: none
- Municipality: Bien Unido, Buenavista, Clarin, Dagohoy, Danao, Getafe, Inabanga, Pres. Carlos P. Garcia, Sagbayan, San Isidro, San Miguel, Talibon, Trinidad, Ubay
- Population (2010): 415,878

Erico Aristotle Aumentado is the incumbent.

Philippine House of Representatives election at Bohol's 2nd district
Party	Candidate	Votes	%
NPC	Erico Aristotle Aumentado	148,541	71.08%
NUP	Agapito Avenido	60,424	28.92%
Total votes		208,965	100.00%
NPC gain from NUP			

=== 3rd District, Congressman ===
- City: none
- Municipality: Alicia, Anda, Batuan, Bilar, Candijay, Carmen, Dimiao, Duero, Garcia Hernandez, Guindulman, Jagna, Lila, Loay, Loboc, Mabini, Pilar, Sevilla, Sierra Bullones, Valencia
- Population (2010): 423,830

Last termer Arthur Yap is the incumbent and term-limited. Instead, he ran for governor and won. Judge Carlos Fernando was the ruling party's official nominee. Former neophyte board member Kristine Alexie Besas-Tutor became the first congresswoman ever elected in Bohol's 3rd District and the second congresswoman elected in the province after Venice Borja-Agana.

Philippine House of Representatives election at Bohol's 3rd district
Party	Candidate	Votes	%
Nacionalista	Kristine Alexie Besas-Tutor	74,991	33.21%
PFP	Conchita Toribio-delos Reyes	65,954	29.21%
PMP	Dionisio Balite	42,877	18.99%
NUP	Carlos Fernando	41,958	18.58%
Total votes		225,780	100.00%
Nacionalista gain from PFP			

== City and Municipal Election ==
All municipalities of Bohol and Tagbilaran City elected mayor, vice-mayor and councilors this election. The mayor and vice mayor with the highest number of votes win the seat; they are voted separately, therefore, they may be of different parties when elected. Below is the list of Mayoral and vice-Mayoral candidates of each city and municipalities in three districts.

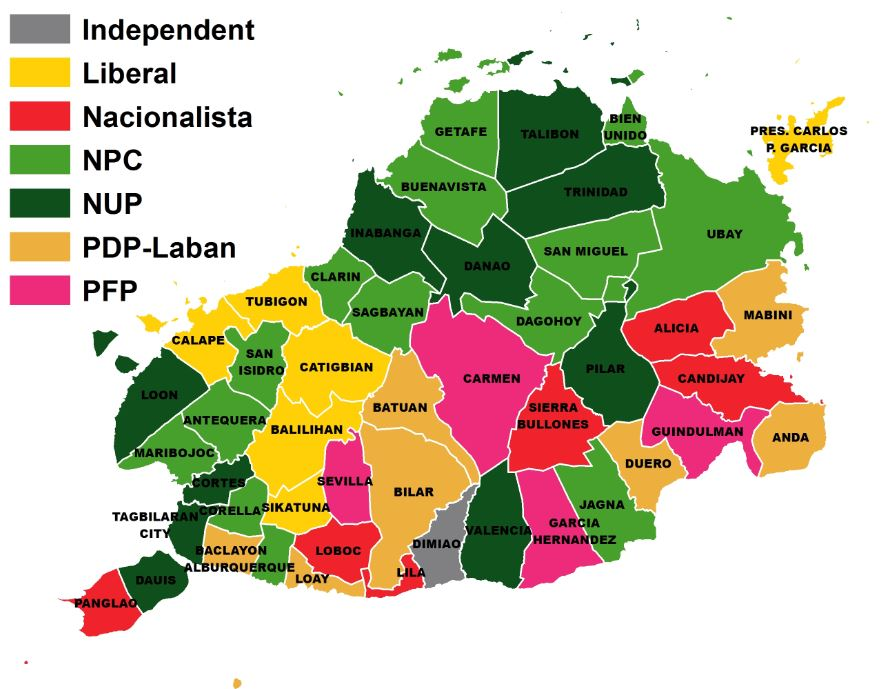
Election results map that refers to results from Bohol's city and municipalities.

=== First District ===
Parties are as stated in their certificates of candidacy.

==== Tagbilaran City ====
- Electorate (2019): 59,949

John Geesnell Yap and Jose Antonio Veloso are the incumbent mayor and vice-mayor.

Tagbilaran City Mayoral Election
Party	Candidate	Votes	%
NUP	John Geesnell Yap II	43,924	88.39%
NPC	Sharleen Lim^{2}	5,770	11.61%
Total votes		49,694	100.00%
NUP gain from NPC			

Tagbilaran City Vice Mayoral Election
Party	Candidate	Votes	%
Liberal	Jose Antonio Veloso	34,318	74.65%
NPC	Arlene Karaan^{3}	11,652	25.35%
Total votes		45,970	100.00%
NUP gain from NPC			

^2 Substituted Lino Karaan (NPC)
^3 Replaced Ma. Ann Balabag (NPC).

==== Alburquerque ====
- Electorate (2019): 7,393

Elpren Charles Tungol and Cayetano Doria Jr. are the incumbents.

Alburquerque Mayoral Election
Party	Candidate	Votes	%
NPC	Don Ritchie Buates	2,408	40.34%
NUP	Elpren Charles Tungol	1,886	31.60%
PFP	Cirilo Jalad	1,485	24.88%
KKK	Eugenio Salibay	190	3.18%
Total votes		5,969	100.00%
NPC gain from NUP			

Alburquerque Vice Mayoral Election
Party	Candidate	Votes	%
NUP	Cayetano Doria Jr.	2,375	41.13%
NPC	Jet Jose Ugduracion	1,714	29.68%
PFP	Adriana Barbon-Milo	1,685	29.18%
Total votes		5,774	100.00%
NUP gain from NPC			

==== Antequera ====
- Electorate (2019): 9,725

Incumbents Jose Mario Pahang and Simon Leo Jadulco just exchanged on the positions they ran with.

Antequera Mayoral Election
Party	Candidate	Votes	%
NPC	Lilioso Nunag	4,295	54.25%
Liberal	Simon Leo Jadulco	3,622	45.75%
Total votes		7,917	100.00%
NPC gain from Liberal			

Antequera Vice Mayoral Election
Party	Candidate	Votes	%
Liberal	Jose Mario Pahang	4,482	56.35%
NPC	Samuel Rebosura	3,472	43.65%
Total votes		7,954	100.00%
Liberal gain from NPC			

==== Baclayon ====
- Electorate (2019): 13,774

Benecio Uy and Romulo Balangkig are the incumbents.

Baclayon Mayoral Election
Party	Candidate	Votes	%
PDP–Laban	Benecio Uy	5,760	50.94%
Nacionalista	Alvin Uy	5,547	49.06%
Total votes		11,307	100.00%
PDP–Laban gain from Nacionalista			

Baclayon Vice Mayoral Election
Party	Candidate	Votes	%
NPC	Romulo Balangkig	6,127	56.21%
PDP–Laban	Pompeyo Saturinas	4,773	43.79%
Total votes		10,900	100.00%
NPC gain from PDP–Laban			

==== Balilihan ====
- Electorate (2019): 13,480

Incumbent Pureza Veloso-Chatto and Adonis Roy Olalo are the incumbents.

Balilihan Mayoral Election
Party	Candidate	Votes	%
Liberal	Maria Pureza Veloso-Chatto	5,622	49.95%
Nacionalista	Joemar Unabia	5,562	49.42%
Independent	Mark Leo Monton	71	0.63%
Total votes		11,255	100.00%
Liberal gain from Nacionalista			

Balilihan Vice Mayoral Election
Party	Candidate	Votes	%
Nacionalista	Adonis Roy Olalo	5,638	50.66%
Liberal	Marianne Domivee Madrio-Chatto	5,491	49.34%
Total votes		11,129	100.00%
Nacionalista gain from Liberal			

==== Calape ====
- Electorate (2019): 22,474

Brothers Nelson Yu and Sulpicio Yu Jr. are the incumbents.

Calape Mayoral Election
Party	Candidate	Votes	%
Liberal	Nelson Yu	14,878	93.86%
Independent	Felix Rengel	973	6.14%
Total votes		15,851	100.00%
Liberal gain from Independent			

Calape Vice Mayoral Election
Party	Candidate	Votes	%
Liberal	Sulpicio Yu Jr.	14,369	89.47%
NPC	Delia Resusta-Dumalag	1,691	10.53%
Total votes		16,060	100.00%
Liberal gain from NPC			

==== Catigbian ====
- Electorate (2019): 15,603

Incumbent mayor Virgilio Lurot did not run for reelection, paving a way for former mayor Roberto Salinas to regain his post. Meanwhile, vice-mayor Necita Napiñas-Digaum vied for reelection.

Catigbian Mayoral Election
Party	Candidate	Votes	%
Liberal	Elizabeth Estampa-Mandin	6,693	52.45%
NPC	Roberto Salinas	6,067	47.55%
Total votes		12,760	100.00%
Liberal gain from NPC			

Catigbian Vice Mayoral Election
Party	Candidate	Votes	%
Liberal	Esteban Angilan	8,000	65.16%
NPC	Necita Napiñas-Digaum	4,277	34.84%
Total votes		12,277	100.00%
Liberal gain from NPC			

==== Corella ====
Incumbent Jose Nicanor Tocmo is the incumbent mayor but term-limited. He ran for Provincial board member instead. Incumbent vice-mayor Ma. Asuncion Banal-Daquio vied for reelection unopposed.

- Electorate (2019): 5,725

Corella Mayoral Election
Party	Candidate	Votes	%
NPC	Hilario Tocmo	2,689	58.33%
Liberal	Vito Rapal	1,921	41.67%
Total votes		4,610	100.00%
NPC gain from Liberal			

Corella Vice Mayoral Election
Party	Candidate	Votes	%
NPC	Maria Asuncion Banal-Daquio	3,428	100.00%
Total votes		3,428	100.00%

==== Cortes ====
- Electorate (2019): 11,689

Lynn Iven Paña-Lim and Leo Pabutoy are the incumbents.

Cortes Mayoral Election
Party	Candidate	Votes	%
NUP	Lynn Iven Paña-Lim	5,698	64.79%
NPC	Roberto Tabanera	2,980	33.88%
KKK	Jaime Bagaipo	117	1.33%
Total votes		8,795	100.00%
NUP gain from NPC			

Cortes Vice Mayoral Election
Party	Candidate	Votes	%
NUP	Leo Pabutoy	6,059	100.00%
Total votes		6,059	100.00%

==== Dauis ====
- Electorate (2019): 29,490

Marietta Tocmo-Sumaylo and Luciano Bongalos are the incumbent mayor and vice-mayor, all ran for reelection and won.

Dauis Mayoral Election
Party	Candidate	Votes	%
NUP	Marietta Tocmo-Sumaylo	19,512	84.94%
NPC	Eillen Cimafranca-Manuel	3,460	15.06%
Total votes		22,972	100.00%
NUP gain from NPC			

Dauis Vice Mayoral Election
Party	Candidate	Votes	%
NUP	Luciano Bongalos	16,902	77.41%
NPC	Ephraim Bomediano	4,933	22.59%
Total votes		21,835	100.00%
NUP gain from NPC			

==== Loon ====
- Electorate (2019): 27,676

Elvi Peter Relampagos and Lloyd Peter Lopez are the incumbents and were reelected.

Loon Mayoral Election
Party	Candidate	Votes	%
NUP	Elvi Peter Relampagos	18,418	86.59%
PFP	Fortunato Garay	2,852	13.41%
Total votes		21,270	100.00%
NUP gain from PFP			

Loon Vice Mayoral Election
Party	Candidate	Votes	%
Liberal	Lloyd Peter Lopez	15,464	69.75%
NPC	Damaso Pasilbas	5,297	23.89%
PFP	Wilfredo Caresosa	1,409	6.36%
Total votes		22,170	100.00%
Liberal gain from NPC			

==== Maribojoc ====
- Electorate (2019): 14,194

Gumersindo Arocha and Jose Veloso are the incumbents.

Maribojoc Mayoral Election
Party	Candidate	Votes	%
NPC	Romulo Manuta	6,409	55.92%
NUP	Gumersindo Arocha	5,052	44.08%
Total votes		11,461	100.00%
NPC gain from NUP			

Maribojoc Vice Mayoral Election
Party	Candidate	Votes	%
NPC	Emilio Castilla	7,541	66.11%
NUP	Jose Veloso	3,865	33.89%
Total votes		11,406	100.00%
NPC gain from NUP			

==== Panglao ====
- Electorate (2019): 24,223

Leonila Paredes-Montero and Pedro Fuertes are the incumbents.

Panglao Mayoral Election
Party	Candidate	Votes	%
Nacionalista	Leonila Paredes-Montero	11,392	57.75%
NUP	Venzencio Arcamo	8,042	40.77%
PDP–Laban	Ruben Arbilon	292	1.48%
Total votes		19,726	100.00%
Nacionalista gain from NUP			

Panglao Vice Mayoral Election
Party	Candidate	Votes	%
Nacionalista	Briccio Velasco	9,791	52.57%
PDP–Laban	Pedro Fuertes	8,834	47.43%
Total votes		18,625	100.00%
Nacionalista gain from PDP–Laban			

==== Sikatuna ====
- Electorate (2019): 5,123

Incumbents Jose Ellorimo Jr. and Julian Manigo are term-limited. The ruling party nominated new candidates.

Sikatuna Mayoral Election
Party	Candidate	Votes	%
Liberal	Justiniana Llanos-Ellorimo	2,521	59.67%
NPC	Capistrano Balili	1,704	40.33%
Total votes		4,225	100.00%
Liberal gain from NPC			

Sikatuna Vice Mayoral Election
Party	Candidate	Votes	%
Liberal	Olimpio Calimpusan	2,753	66.47%
NPC	Joel Ocho	1,389	33.53%
Total votes		4,142	100.00%
Liberal gain from NPC			

==== Tubigon ====
- Electorate (2019): 31,075

William Richard Jao is the incumbent mayor. However incumbent vice-mayor Virgilio Fortich is term limited, have already served for 3 consecutive terms.

Tubigon Mayoral Election
Party	Candidate	Votes	%
Liberal	William Richard Jao	13,992	55.69%
NPC	Marlon Amila	10,823	43.07%
Independent	Roberto Lopez Jr.	312	1.24%
Total votes		25,127	100.00%
Liberal gain from NPC			

Tubigon Vice Mayoral Election
Party	Candidate	Votes	%
Liberal	Renato Villaber	12,122	50.35%
NPC	Susan Concha-Lopez	11,952	49.65%
Total votes		24,074	100.00%
Liberal gain from NPC			

=== Second District ===
Parties are as stated in their certificates of candidacy.

==== Bien Unido ====
- Electorate (2019): 18,170

Elected vice-mayor Rene Borenaga replaced mayor Gisela Bendong-Boniel after the latter's tragic death. Borenaga ran for full-term as mayor and won. Incumbent vice-mayor Ramon Arcenal also got his full-term.

Bien Unido Mayoral Election
Party	Candidate	Votes	%
NPC	Rene Borenaga	6,626	48.48%
NUP	Joselyn Pepito-Villarias	3,634	26.59%
PFP	Francisco Paquito Avenido	3,407	24.93%
Total votes		13,667	100.00%
NPC gain from NUP			

Bien Unido Vice Mayoral Election
Party	Candidate	Votes	%
NPC	Ramon Arcenal	5,583	44.16%
PFP	Leonaria Avenido-Atillo	4,850	38.36%
KKK	Jesus Esma Jr.	2,210	17.48%
Total votes		12,643	100.00%
NPC gain from PFP			

==== Buenavista ====
- Electorate (2019): 19,907

Mayor Ronald Lowell Tirol died while in office. His successor incumbent vice-mayor Dave Duallo ran for full term as mayor and won. Ma. Christine Cabarrubias-Torregosa ran for vice-mayor unopposed.

Buenavista Mayoral Election
Party	Candidate	Votes	%
NPC	Dave Duallo	8,056	51.89%
NUP	Rico Cabarrubias	7,468	48.11%
Total votes			100.00%
NPC gain from NUP			

Buenavista Vice Mayoral Election
Party	Candidate	Votes	%
NUP	Ma. Christine Cabarrubias-Torregosa	10,343	100.00%
Total votes		10,343	100.00%

==== Clarin ====
- Electorate (2019): 15,338

Allen Ray Piezas is the incumbent but term limited. He decided to run for vice-mayor instead and won. Meanwhile, incumbent vice-mayor Velden Aparicio is term-limited.

Clarin Mayoral Election
Party	Candidate	Votes	%
NPC	Eugeniano Ibarra	7,693	60.58%
NUP	Corsine Cepada-Salera	5,006	39.42%
Total votes		12,699	100.00%
NPC gain from NUP			

Clarin Vice Mayoral Election
Party	Candidate	Votes	%
Independent	Allen Ray Piezas	6,253	50.09%
NPC	Fernando Camacho Jr.	6,231	49.91%
Total votes		12,484	100.00%
NUP gain from NPC			

==== Dagohoy ====
- Electorate (2019): 12,754

Sofronio Apat and Ma. Shirley Abulag-Amodia are the incumbents and won.

Dagohoy Mayoral Election
Party	Candidate	Votes	%
NPC	Sofronio Apat	6,024	60.97%
NUP	Troubador Autentico	3,857	39.03%
Total votes		9,881	100.00%
NPC gain from NUP			

Dagohoy Vice Mayoral Election
Party	Candidate	Votes	%
NPC	Ma. Shirley Abulag-Amodia	6,412	67.25%
NUP	Alejandro Paña	3,123	32.75%
Total votes		9,535	100.00%
NPC gain from NUP			

==== Danao ====
- Electorate (2019): 13,547

Natividad Gonzaga is the incumbent. Former mayor and current incumbent vice-mayor Jose Cepedoza ran again for town's chief executive and won.

Danao Mayoral Election
Party	Candidate	Votes	%
NUP	Jose Cepedoza	6,788	64.51%
NPC	Natividad Redulla-Gonzaga	3,734	35.49%
Total votes		10,522	100.00%
NUP gain from NPC			

Danao Vice Mayoral Election
Party	Candidate	Votes	%
NUP	Albert Vitor	6,525	62.80%
NPC	Rey Bantilan	3,865	37.20%
Total votes		10,390	100.00%
NUP gain from NPC			

==== Getafe ====
- Electorate (2019): 20,739

Casey Shaun Camacho and Eduardo Torremocha are the incumbents and were reelected.

Getafe Mayoral Election
Party	Candidate	Votes	%
NPC	Casey Shaun Camacho	8,756	53.93%
NUP	Romeo Cabading^{6}	7,479	46.07%
Total votes		16,235	100.00%
NPC gain from NUP			

Getafe Vice Mayoral Election
Party	Candidate	Votes	%
NPC	Eduardo Torremocha	7,731	51.67%
NUP	Dennis Torrenueva^{7}	7,230	48.33%
Total votes		14,961	100.00%
NPC gain from NUP			

^6 Substituted Rodolfo dela Torre (NUP).
^7 Substituted Danilo Enghog (NUP).

==== Inabanga ====
- Electorate (2019): 26,345

Josephine Socorro Ching-Jumamoy and Rodrigo Jumamoy are the incumbents and won.

Inabanga Mayoral Election
Party	Candidate	Votes	%
NUP	Josephine Socorro Ching-Jumamoy	15,872	67.86%
NPC	Concepcion Cabatingan-Muneses	7,341	31.39%
Independent	Erlando Suarez	177	0.76%
Total votes		23,390	100.00%
NUP gain from NPC			

Inabanga Vice Mayoral Election
Party	Candidate	Votes	%
NUP	Rodrigo Jumamoy	14,917	71.21%
NPC	Zenon Acaba Jr.	6,031	28.79%
Total votes		20,948	100.00%
NUP gain from NPC			

==== Pres. Carlos P. Garcia ====
- Electorate (2019): 16,473

Fernando Estavilla and Renato Sente are the incumbents. Estavilla was reelected but not Sente.

Pres. Carlos P. Garcia Mayoral Election
Party	Candidate	Votes	%
Liberal	Fernando Estavilla	7,905	69.48%
Independent	Edilberto Escaño	3,472	30.52%
Total votes		11,377	100.00%
Liberal gain from Independent			

Pres. Carlos P. Garcia Vice Mayoral Election
Party	Candidate	Votes	%
NUP	Adriano Abad	5,376	48.54%
Liberal	Renato Sente	5,131	46.33%
Independent	Obligado Casiano Jr.	568	5.13%
Total votes		11,075	100.00%
NUP gain from Liberal			

==== Sagbayan ====
- Electorate (2019): 15,999

Ricardo Suarez is the incumbent but term-limited. The ruling party nominated new candidates.

Sagbayan Mayoral Election
Party	Candidate	Votes	%
NPC	Restituto Suarez III	8,127	65.16%
NUP	Jimmy Torrefranca	4,345	34.84%
Total votes		12,472	100.00%
NPC gain from NUP			

Sagbayan Vice Mayoral Election
Party	Candidate	Votes	%
NPC	Asuncion Bautista-Ybañez	7,215	61.22%
NUP	Victor Lauron	3,644	30.92%
Independent	Ambrosio Soquillo Jr.	926	7.86%
Total votes		11,785	100.00%
NPC gain from NUP			

==== San Isidro ====
- Electorate (2019): 7,152

Incumbent mayor Jacinto Naraga is term-limited. Meanwhile, incumbent vice-mayor Filemon Mantabute ran for reelection and won.

San Isidro Mayoral Election
Party	Candidate	Votes	%
NPC	Diosdado Gementiza Jr.	3,534	63.14%
NUP	Elsa Naraga-Mante	2,046	36.56%
Independent	Rolando Talaboc	17	0.30%
Total votes		5,597	100.00%
NPC gain from NUP			

San Isidro Vice Mayoral Election
Party	Candidate	Votes	%
NPC	Filemon Mantabote	3,599	66.91%
NUP	Apolinar Gumanid Jr.	1,780	33.09%
Total votes		5,379	100.00%
NPC gain from NUP			

==== San Miguel ====
- Electorate (2019): 15,952

Incumbent mayor Nunila Mendez-Pinat is not seeking for reelection. On the other hand, incumbent vice-mayor Faustino Bulaga ran for reelection and won.

San Miguel Mayoral Election
Party	Candidate	Votes	%
NPC	Virgilio Mendez	10,301	89.65%
DPP	Bernardo Avenido Jr.	1,189	10.35%
Total votes		11,490	100.00%
NPC gain from DPP			

San Miguel Vice Mayoral Election
Party	Candidate	Votes	%
NPC	Faustino Bulaga	10,407	91.55%
Independent	Emilio Nuez	961	8.45%
Total votes		11,368	100.00%
NPC gain from Independent			

==== Talibon ====
- Electorate (2019): 33,211

Incumbent Restituto Auxtero seek for election as Sangguniang Panlalawigan member. Incumbent vice-mayor Cleto Garcia ran for mayor of the town. Janette Aurestila-Garcia became the first female chief executive of the town.

Talibon Mayoral Election
Party	Candidate	Votes	%
NUP	Janette Aurestila-Garcia	15,004	51.33%
Independent	Epifanio Quimson	7,231	24.74%
NPC	Cleto Garcia	6,997	23.94%
Total votes		29,232	100.00%
NUP gain from Independent			

Talibon Vice Mayoral Election
Party	Candidate	Votes	%
NUP	Dave Evangelista	14,753	52.49%
NPC	Ma. Junette Evalaroza-Loma	13,351	47.51%
Total votes		28,104	100.00%
NUP gain from NPC			

==== Trinidad ====
- Electorate (2019): 19,017

Incumbents Judith del Rosario-Cajes and Manuel Garcia ran for reelection and won.

Trinidad Mayoral Election
Party	Candidate	Votes	%
NUP	Judith del Rosario-Cajes	9,800	55.21%
NPC	Juanilo Orioque	7,952	44.79%
Total votes		17,752	100.00%
NUP gain from NPC			

Trinidad Vice Mayoral Election
Party	Candidate	Votes	%
NUP	Manuel Garcia	10,156	60.55%
NPC	Pablo Otara	6,618	39.45%
Total votes		16,774	100.00%
NUP gain from NPC			

==== Ubay ====
- Electorate (2019): 47,345

Incumbents Constantino Reyes and Nelson Uy seek for reelection. Reyes was reelected but not Uy.

Ubay Mayoral Election
Party	Candidate	Votes	%
NPC	Constantino Reyes	22,330	63.72%
NUP	Galicano Atup	10,761	30.71%
Liberal	Indalicio Reyes	1,101	3.14%
Independent	Danilo Mendez	851	2.43%
Total votes			100.00%
NPC gain from NUP			

Ubay Vice Mayoral Election
Party	Candidate	Votes	%
NPC	Victor Bonghanoy	16,645	50.36%
NUP	Nelson Uy	16,407	49.64%
Total votes		33,052	100.00%
NPC gain from NUP			

=== Third District ===
Parties are as stated in their certificates of candidacy.

==== Alicia ====
- Electorate (2019): 15,807

Incumbents Marnilou Salas-Ayuban and Victoriano Torres III just exchanged positions they ran with and won.

Alicia Mayoral Election
Party	Candidate	Votes	%
Nacionalista	Victoriano Torres III	4,199	34.36%
Lakas	Pedro Miasco	2,979	24.38%
Independent	Basilo Balahay Jr.	2,817	23.05%
PFP	Frasan Corre	2,107	17.24%
NPC	Jonathan Puracan	119	0.97%
Total votes		12,221	100.00%
Nacionalista gain from Lakas			

Alicia Vice Mayoral Election
Party	Candidate	Votes	%
Nacionalista	Marnilou Salas-Ayuban	8,183	71.21%
NUP	Leonardo Namoco	3,105	27.02%
NPC	Candido Gavas Jr.	204	1.78%
Total votes			100.00%
Nacionalista gain from NUP			

==== Anda ====
- Electorate (2019): 13,313

Incumbent Angelina Blanco-Simacio and Nilo Bersabal vied for reelection. Bersabal was reelected.

Anda Mayoral Election
Party	Candidate	Votes	%
PDP–Laban	Metodio Amper	5,480	51.07%
NPC	Angelina Blanco-Simacio	5,251	48.93%
Total votes		10,731	100.00%
PDP–Laban gain from NPC			

Anda Vice Mayoral Election
Party	Candidate	Votes	%
NPC	Nilo Bersabal	5,338	51.11%
PDP–Laban	Rey Amper	5,106	48.89%
Total votes		10,444	100.00%
NPC gain from PDP–Laban			

==== Batuan ====
- Electorate (2019): 9,556

Incumbents Antonino Jumawid and Precious Joy Dumagan-Baguio ran for reelection and won.

Batuan Mayoral Election
Party	Candidate	Votes	%
PDP–Laban	Antonino Jumawid	4,499	58.86%
NPC	Delfin Hingpit	2,906	38.02%
Independent	Nerio Dolotina	239	3.13%
Total votes		7,644	100.00%
PDP–Laban gain from NPC			

Batuan Vice Mayoral Election
Party	Candidate	Votes	%
PFP	Precious Joy Dumagan-Baguio	3,801	50.86%
PDP–Laban	Joseph Avito Dano	3,673	49.14%
Total votes		7,474	100.00%
PFP gain from PDP–Laban			

==== Bilar ====
- Electorate (2019): 12,845

Norman Palacio is the incumbent but term limited. He decided to run as vice-mayor instead. Meanwhile, incumbent vice-mayor Arnold Calamba is term-limited.

Bilar Mayoral Election
Party	Candidate	Votes	%
PDP–Laban	Manuel Jayectin	5,573	53.52%
Nacionalista	Danilo Cal	4,799	46.09%
DPP	Henry Manuel Uy	41	0.39%
Total votes		10,413	100.00%
PDP–Laban gain from Nacionalista			

Bilar Vice Mayoral Election
Party	Candidate	Votes	%
Nacionalista	Norman Palacio	5,515	53.96%
PDP–Laban	Rodrigo Hinghing	4,706	46.04%
Total votes		10,221	100.00%
Nacionalista gain from PDP–Laban			

==== Candijay ====
- Electorate (2019): 21,512

Christopher Tutor is the incumbent and won. Unfortunately, former vice-mayor Jesse Sales died while in office.

Candijay Mayoral Election
Party	Candidate	Votes	%
Nacionalista	Christopher Tutor	13,839	85.80%
PDP–Laban	Ann Piquero-Dy	2,290	14.20%
Total votes		16,129	100.00%
Nacionalista gain from PDP–Laban			

Candijay Vice Mayoral Election
Party	Candidate	Votes	%
Nacionalista	Jesusa Baylosis-Mapute	9,040	58.89%
PFP	Raul Piquero	58.89%	14.20%
Independent	Gerardo Piloton	463	3.02%
Total votes		15,350	100.00%
Nacionalista gain from PFP			

==== Carmen ====
- Electorate (2019): 33,270

Incumbents Ricardo Francisco Toribio and Romeo Bigay Jr. are seek for reelection on their respective posts and won.

Carmen Mayoral Election
Party	Candidate	Votes	%
PFP	Ricardo Francisco Toribio	15,566	60.48%
PDP–Laban	Pedro Budiongan Jr.	10,173	39.52%
Total votes		25,739	100.00%
PFP gain from PDP–Laban			

Carmen Vice Mayoral Election
Party	Candidate	Votes	%
PDP–Laban	Romeo Bigay Jr.	13,151	52.81%
PFP	Eliezer Cagol Jr. ^{4}	11,752	47.19%
Total votes		24,903	100.00%
PDP–Laban gain from PFP			

^4 Substituted Victor Tesio (PFP).

==== Dimiao ====
- Electorate (2019): 11,106

Danilo Guivencan is the incumbent but lost. Incumbent vice-mayor Aniceta Calihat-Ucang didn't run for reelection.

Dimiao Mayoral Election
Party	Candidate	Votes	%
Independent	Randolph Ang	4,418	50.67%
PFP	Danilo Guivencan	4,091	46.92%
Independent	Teodulo Halasan	211	2.42%
Total votes		8,720	100.00%
Independent gain from PFP			

Dimiao Vice Mayoral Election
Party	Candidate	Votes	%
PDP–Laban	Gilberto Lagua	3,863	47.18%
Independent	Nicodemus Tago	3,770	46.05%
Independent	Russel Yecyec	554	6.77%
Total votes		8,187	100.00%
PDP–Laban gain from Independent			

==== Duero ====
- Electorate (2019): 13,695

Incumbent mayor Conrada Castino-Amparo vied against vice-mayor Emma Fe Peligro-Bajade for mayorship of the town. Amparo won and reelected.

Duero Mayoral Election
Party	Candidate	Votes	%
PDP–Laban	Conrada Castino-Amparo	5,867	55.60%
NPC	Emma Fe Peligro-Bajade	4,686	44.40%
Total votes		10,553	100.00%
PDP–Laban gain from NPC			

Duero Vice Mayoral Election
Party	Candidate	Votes	%
NPC	Gillian Ranga-Achacoso	4,414	41.83%
PDP–Laban	Felomino Palaca Jr.	3,671	34.79%
PFP	Jefferson Torralba	2,468	23.39%
Total votes		10,553	100.00%
NPC gain from PDP–Laban			

==== Garcia Hernandez ====
- Electorate (2019): 16,374

Incumbents mayor Tita Baja-Gallentes and vice-mayor Lito Dajalos were at one-on-one battle for town chief executive. Gallentes was reelected.

Garcia Hernandez Mayoral Election
Party	Candidate	Votes	%
PFP	Tita Baja-Gallentes	7,759	62.20%
PDP–Laban	Lito Dajalos	4,716	37.80%
Total votes		12,475	100.00%
PFP gain from PDP–Laban			

Garcia Hernandez Vice Mayoral Election
Party	Candidate	Votes	%
PDP–Laban	Miguelito Galendez	6,364	51.96%
PFP	Honorio Jaminal	5,885	48.04%
Total votes		12,249	100.00%
PDP–Laban gain from PFP			

==== Guindulman ====
- Electorate (2019): 22,878

Albino Balo is the incumbent mayor. Incumbent vice-mayor Ma.Fe Añana-Piezas seek to regain her old position as mayor and was elected.

Guindulman Mayoral Election
Party	Candidate	Votes	%
PFP	Ma.Fe Añana-Piezas	9,628	54.34%
PDP–Laban	Albino Balo	8,089	45.66%
Total votes		17,717	100.00%
PFP gain from PDP–Laban			

Guindulman Vice Mayoral Election
Party	Candidate	Votes	%
PFP	Martin Lagura Jr.	10,013	57.52%
PDP–Laban	Nelson Janiola	7,394	42.48%
Total votes		17,407	100.00%
PFP gain from PDP–Laban			

==== Jagna ====
- Electorate (2019): 22,666

Incumbents mayor Fortunato Abrenilla and vice-mayor Bonifacio Virtudes Jr. just exchanged positions they are ran to. However, Abrenilla died while in office. His brother, Theodore Abrenilla was named as a replacement candidate and won.

Jagna Mayoral Election
Party	Candidate	Votes	%
NPC	Joseph Rañola	7,650	41.85%
PDP–Laban	Bonifacio Virtudes Jr.	7,243	39.62%
PFP	Raymund Tan	2,650	14.50%
KKK	Servando Acas	614	3.36%
Independent	Susan Cadorna-Tan	123	0.67%
Total votes		18,280	100.00%
NPC gain from PDP–Laban			

Jagna Vice Mayoral Election
Party	Candidate	Votes	%
PDP–Laban	Theodore Abrenilla^{8}	6,534	36.50%
NPC	Teofisto Pagar Jr.	6,079	33.96%
Independent	Rodrigo Lloren	5,290	29.55%
Total votes		17,903	100.00%
PDP–Laban gain from NPC			

^8 Substituted his brother Fortunato (PDP-Laban) who died while in office.

==== Lila ====
- Electorate (2019): 7,571

Incumbent mayor Regina Cahiles-Salazar and vice-mayor Arturo Piollo II just exchanged positions and won.

Lila Mayoral Election
Party	Candidate	Votes	%
Nacionalista	Arturo Piollo II	3,344	55.43%
Lakas	Eugene Cahiles	2,689	44.57%
Total votes		6,033	100.00%
Nacionalista gain from Lakas			

Lila Vice Mayoral Election
Party	Candidate	Votes	%
Lakas	Regina Cahiles-Salazar	3,511	59.08%
NUP	Frederick Raut	2,432	40.92%
Total votes		5,943	100.00%
Lakas gain from NUP			

==== Loay ====
- Electorate (2019): 13,073

Incumbent mayor Rochelle Brigitte Imboy-Abutazil moved down to run for vice-mayor while his mother and former mayor Rosemarie Lim-Imboy ran on her place. Both failed on their candidancies, ending 12-year dominance of Imboys since 2007.

Loay Mayoral Election
Party	Candidate	Votes	%
PDP–Laban	Hilario Ayuban	5,732	53.90%
NPC	Rosemarie Lim-Imboy	4,888	45.97%
Independent	Gabriel Espiritu	14	0.13%
Total votes		10,634	100.00%
PDP–Laban gain from NPC			

Loay Vice Mayoral Election
Party	Candidate	Votes	%
PDP–Laban	Rodrigo Cubarol Jr.	5,430	52.02%
NPC	Rochelle Brigitte Imboy-Abutazil	5,008	47.98%
Total votes		10,438	100.00%
PDP–Laban gain from NPC			

==== Loboc ====
- Electorate (2019): 12,938

Helen Calipusan-Alaba is the incumbent but didn't seek third and final term. Former mayor Leon Calipusan is the ruling party's official nominee and was elected. Meanwhile, incumbent vice-mayor Pablito Sumampong vied for reelection and won.

Loboc Mayoral Election
Party	Candidate	Votes	%
Nacionalista	Leon Calipusan	5,498	51.28%
PDP–Laban	Enrique Baguio	5,224	48.72%
Total votes		10,722	100.00%
Nacionalista gain from PDP–Laban			

Loboc Vice Mayoral Election
Party	Candidate	Votes	%
Nacionalista	Pablio Sumampong	5,371	51.25%
PDP–Laban	Erwin Baquial	5,108	48.75%
Total votes		10,479	100.00%
Nacionalista gain from PDP–Laban			

==== Mabini ====
- Electorate (2019): 18,738

This was a one-on-one battle between incumbent mayor Juanito Jayoma and vice-mayor Jesha Cuyacot-Toque for the top post of the town. Jayoma was reelected.

Mabini Mayoral Election
Party	Candidate	Votes	%
PDP–Laban	Juanito Jayoma	8,358	57.20%
Nacionalista	Jesha Cuyacot-Toque	6,253	42.80%
Total votes		14,611	100.00%
PDP–Laban gain from Nacionalista			

Mabini Vice Mayoral Election
Party	Candidate	Votes	%
PDP–Laban	Renato Tutor^{5}	7,434	53.48%
Nacionalista	Esther Anchuelo	6,466	46.52%
Total votes		13,900	100.00%
PDP–Laban gain from Nacionalista			

^5 Substituted Romeo Jayoma (PFP).

==== Pilar ====
- Electorate (2019): 18,454

Incumbents Necitas Tabaranza-Cubrado and Eugenio Datahan II seek for reelection and won.

Pilar Mayoral Election
Party	Candidate	Votes	%
NUP	Necitas Tabaranza-Cubrado	7,197	51.24%
LDP	Wilson Pajo	6,849	48.76%
Total votes		14,046	100.00%
NUP gain from LDP			

Pilar Vice Mayoral Election
Party	Candidate	Votes	%
NUP	Eugenio Datahan II	8,570	63.20%
LDP	Eugenio Galleza	4,990	36.80%
Total votes		13,560	100.00%
NUP gain from LDP			

==== Sevilla ====
- Electorate (2019): 8,026

Incumbents Juliet Bucag-Dano and Richard Bucag both ran for reelection and won.

Sevilla Mayoral Election
Party	Candidate	Votes	%
PFP	Juliet Bucag-Dano	3,630	55.31%
PDP–Laban	Ernesita Bungabong-Digal	2,933	44.69%
Total votes		6,563	100.00%
PFP gain from PDP–Laban			

Sevilla Vice Mayoral Election
Party	Candidate	Votes	%
PFP	Richard Bucag	3,343	51.53%
PDP–Laban	Marcelo Item	3,144	48.47%
Total votes		6,487	100.00%
PFP gain from PDP–Laban			

==== Sierra Bullones ====
- Electorate (2019): 15,053

Incumbent mayor Simplicio Maestrado and vice-mayor Rainfredo Buslon vied against each other for town's top executive post. Maestrado was reelected.

Sierra Bullones Mayoral Election
Party	Candidate	Votes	%
Nacionalista	Simplicio Maestrado	8,310	64.64%
PDP–Laban	Rainfredo Buslon	4,545	35.36%
Total votes		12,855	100.00%
Nacionalista gain from PDP–Laban			

Sierra Bullones Vice Mayoral Election
Party	Candidate	Votes	%
PDP–Laban	Rey Yamaro	6,290	51.10%
Nacionalista	Edgar Galve	6,019	48.90%
Total votes		12,309	100.00%
PDP–Laban gain from Nacionalista			

==== Valencia ====
- Electorate (2019): 17,169

Incumbent mayor Maria Katrina Lim seek for reelection unopposed. Her opponent, Jesus Balistoy Jr. withdrew his candidacy last November 29, 2018.

Valencia Mayoral Election
Party	Candidate	Votes	%
NUP	Maria Katrina Lim	11,375	100.00%
Total votes		11,375	100.00%

Valencia Vice Mayoral Election
Party	Candidate	Votes	%
NUP	Calixto Garcia	9,581	78.67%
NPC	Arturo Adecer	2,598	21.33%
Total votes		12,179	100.00%
NUP gain from NPC			
