= List of senators elected in the 2010 Philippine Senate election =

The 2010 Senate election in the Philippines occurred on May 10, 2010, to elect one-half of the Senate. The senators elected in 2010, together with those elected in 2007, comprise the Senate's delegation in the 15th Congress.

The canvassing of votes for senator was done in record time, attributed partly to the use precinct count optical scanner voting machines; the voting machines were used in a national election for the time, and proclamation for the first nine winners was done five days after Election Day, while the latter three's was done three days later. all incumbents that ran successfully defended their seats, with four former senators and two new senators being elected.

== Manner of election ==
Voting for senators is via nationwide, at-large basis via plurality-at-large voting system. A voter has twelve votes: the voter can vote less than twelve but not more than it. Then votes are tallied nationwide and the twelve candidates with the highest number of votes are elected to the Senate. The Commission on Elections administers elections for the Senate, with the Senate Electoral Tribunal deciding election disputes after a Senator has taken office.

== Senators elected in 2010 ==
- Key: Boldface: incumbent, italicized: neophyte senator

Rank	Image	Senator	Party	Voted at*	Date proclaimed	Religion	Prior congressional and elective executive positions	Born
1st		**Bong Revilla**	Lakas	Imus, Cavite	May 15, 2010	Roman Catholicism	Senator (2004–2010), Governor of Cavite (1998–2001), Vice Governor of Cavite (1992–1998)	1966
2nd		**Jinggoy Estrada**	PMP	San Juan	May 15, 2010	Roman Catholicism	Senator (2004–2010), Mayor of San Juan (1992–2001), Vice Mayor of San Juan (1988–1992)	1963
3rd		**Miriam Defensor Santiago**	PRP	Quezon City	May 15, 2010	Roman Catholicism	Senator (1995–2001, 2004–2010)	1945
4th		Franklin Drilon	Liberal	Iloilo City	May 15, 2010	Roman Catholicism	Senator (1995–2007; Senate President, 2000, 2001–2004)	1945
5th		**Juan Ponce Enrile**	PMP	Aparri Cagayan	May 15, 2010	Roman Catholicism	Senator (1987–1992, 1995–2001, 2004–2010; Senate President, 2008–2010), member of the House of Representatives from Cagayan's 1st district (1992–1995), Member of the Batasang Pambansa from Region II (1978–1984), and from Cagayan's at-large district (1984–1986)	1924
6th		**Pia Cayetano**	Nacionalista	Taguig	May 15, 2010	Evangelical Christianity	Senator (2004–2010)	1966
7th		Bongbong Marcos	Nacionalista	Batac, Ilocos Norte	May 15, 2010	Roman Catholicism	Member of the House of Representatives from Ilocos Norte's 2nd district (1992–1995, 2007–2010), Governor of Ilocos Norte (1983–1986, 1998–2007)	1957
8th		Ralph Recto	Liberal	Lipa, Batangas	May 15, 2010	Roman Catholicism	Senator (2001–2007), member of the House of Representatives from Batangas' 4th district (1992–2001)	1964
9th		Tito Sotto	NPC	Quezon City	May 15, 2010	Roman Catholicism	Senator (1992–2004), Vice Mayor of Quezon City (1988–1992)	1948
10th		Serge Osmeña	Independent	Makati	May 18, 2010	Roman Catholicism	Senator (1995–2007)	1943
11th		**Lito Lapid**	Lakas	Porac, Pampanga	May 18, 2010	Roman Catholicism	Senator (2004–2010), Governor of Pampanga (1995–2004), Vice Governor of Pampanga (1992–1995)	1955
12th		TG Guingona	Liberal	Malaybalay, Bukidnon	May 18, 2010	Roman Catholicism	Member of the House of Representatives from Bukidnon's 2nd district (2004–2010)	1959

*Senators are elected on a nationwide, at-large basis.

== See also ==
- List of representatives elected in the Philippine House of Representatives elections, 2010
