= Rene Relampagos =

Filipino politician

Rene L. Relampagos
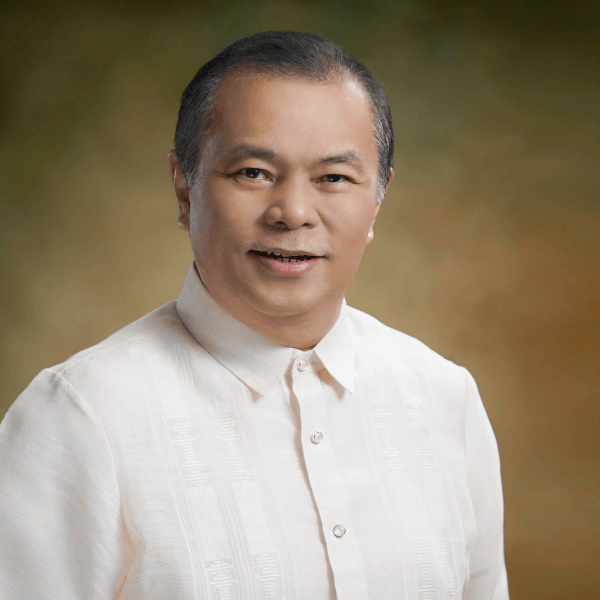
- Official portrait, 2019

Member of the Philippine House of Representatives from Bohol's First District
- In office June 30, 2010 – June 30, 2019
- Preceded by: Edgar Chatto
- Succeeded by: Edgar Chatto

23rd Governor of Bohol
- In office June 30, 1995 – June 30, 2001
- Vice Governor: Edgar Chatto
- Preceded by: David Tirol
- Succeeded by: Erico Aumentado

Vice Governor of Bohol
- In office June 30, 2019 – June 30, 2022
- Governor: Arthur Yap
- Preceded by: Dionisio Balite Sr.
- Succeeded by: Dionisio Victor Balite
- In office June 30, 1992 – June 30, 1995
- Governor: David Tirol
- Preceded by: Erico Aumentado
- Succeeded by: Edgar Chatto

Member of the Bohol Provincial Board
- In office June 30, 1989 – June 30, 1992

Technical Consultant for Youth and Sports Development, Bohol
- In office 1988–1989

Personal details
- Born: December 28, 1963 (age 62) Tagbilaran, Bohol, Philippines
- Party: NUP (2016-present)
- Other political affiliations: Liberal (2009-2016); LDP (until 2009)
- Spouse: Imelda Adiong

Rene Lopez Relampagos (born December 28, 1963) is a Filipino politician. He is a former vice-governor of the Province of Bohol after having been elected in the local elections as part of the 2019 Philippine General Election and ending his term on June 30, 2022. He has also served three terms as a member of the House of Representatives of the Philippines representing the 1st congressional district of the Province of Bohol.

== Biography and career ==
Rene Lopez Relampagos was born on December 28, 1963, in Tagbilaran City, Bohol, Philippines. He is the son of the former Loon, Bohol mayor Juan "Aning" M. Relampagos and Esperanza "Nene" Lopez Relampagos.

== Political career ==
He started his political career as Technical Consultant for Youth and Sports Development of the Bohol Provincial Government from 1988 to 1989. He then became board member of the Province of Bohol from 1989 to 1992. In 1992, he was elected as Vice Governor of the Provincial Government of Bohol and served until 1995. He served as Governor of the province of Bohol from 1995 to 2001. In the local elections as part of the 2010 Philippine General Election, he ran and won as a member of the House of Representatives as representative of the first district of Bohol. He continued to win his re-election bids for 2013 and 2016 respectively, allowing him to serve a full three terms as the 1st District Representative of the Province of Bohol. During the 2019 Philippine General Election, he ran for the position of Vice-Governor of Bohol and won after securing 317,318 votes against his opponent's 277,933 votes.

== Committee membership ==
- Chairman, Committee on Human Rights
- Vice Chairman, Committee on Information and Communications Technology
- Member, Committee on Accounts
- Member, Committee on Transportation
- Member, Committee on Tourism
- Member, Committee on Higher and Technical Education
- Member, Congressional Oversight Committee on Biofuels

== Awards ==
- Top Province in Assessment Efficiency – Region VII (1988)
- Regional Silver Award, Most Outstanding Province in Local Budget Administration (1997 and 1998)
- Website of the Year (Government Category, Philippine Webby Awards) – 1999
- Galing Pook Award and Cash Prize: Cultural Renaissance Program (Galing Pook Foundation, AIM, Ford Foundation) – 2000
- Galing Pook Award: Bohol Investment Promotion Program (Galing Pook Foundation, AIM, Ford Foundation) – 2000
- Outstanding Library of the Philippines (The National Library) – 2000
- Guhit Award for Cultural Heritage (for the Diocese of Tagbilaran and the Province of Bohol given by Design and Architecture Magazine) – 2000
- Best Performing Peace and Order Council – Region VII (DILG) – 2000
- Best Performing LGU-Province Category (PADAC) Anti-Illegal Drugs Campaign – Region VII (DILG)-2000
- Cash Award for Attaining the Program Benchmarks for CY2001 Ahead of Schedule under the LGU Performance Program (LPP) on Health (DOH/USAID) – 2000
- Most Outstanding Province: Philippine Plan of Action and Nutrition – Region VII (CSC) – 2000
- Province with the Highest Number of Participating Municipalities Nationwide in its Real Property Data Computerization Program under MDP III (BLDGF-DOF) – 2000
- Most Outstanding Travel Mart Exhibitor – Visayas Travel Mart (DOT and Cebu Chamber of Commerce and Industry) – 2000
- Presidential Awardee, Cleanest and Greenest Province – 1999
- Outstanding Province in Real Property Tax Collection – Region VII (BLGF-DOF) – 1999
- Outstanding Provincial Disaster and Coordinating Council – Region VII (DILG) – 1999

== See also ==
- Members of the 15th Congress of the Philippines
- Members of the 16th Congress of the Philippines
- Members of the 17th Congress of the Philippines
- 2019 Bohol local elections
- 2022 Bohol local elections
