= Ruben Torres (Filipino politician) =

Philippine politician

Member of the House of Representatives from Zambales's 2nd district
- In office June 30, 2001 – June 30, 2004
- Preceded by: Antonio Diaz
- Succeeded by: Antonio Diaz

29th Executive Secretary of the Philippines
- In office May 20, 1995 – January 8, 1998
- President: Fidel V. Ramos
- Preceded by: Teofisto Guingona Jr.
- Succeeded by: Alexander Aguirre

Secretary of Labor and Employment
- In office January 20, 1990 – February 11, 1992
- President: Corazon Aquino
- Preceded by: Dionisio C. dela Serna
- Succeeded by: Nieves Confesor

Undersecretary of Labor and Employment
- In office 1989 – January 20, 1990

Personal details
- Born: September 10, 1941 (age 85) Botolan, Zambales, Philippine Commonwealth
- Party: PMP (2007)
- Other political affiliations: Lakas (2001–2007); Independent (1977–2001); PKP-1930 (1965–1977)
- Spouse: Amaryllis Tiglao (m. 1968)
- Children: 4
- Education: University of the Philippines Diliman (BA, LL.B)
- Profession: Politician

Ruben Deloso Torres (born September 10, 1941) is a Filipino politician and former communist leader. He went by the nom de guerre "Kadre" while he was a member of the Partido Komunista ng Pilipinas (PKP) from the 1960s to the 1970s.

== Life ==
=== Education ===
Torres went to high school in Marikina, Rizal, and was a student activist at the University of the Philippines Diliman (UPD) in the 1950s and the early 1960s.

=== Marcos government; Partido Komunista ng Pilipinas member ===
Torres was recruited to the Partido Komunista ng Pilipinas (PKP) by Francisco "Dodong" Nemenzo in the mid-1960s. In 1966, he was hired as a government official under the Marcos administration, a position he held simultaneous to being a Central Committee member of the PKP. On March 16, 1968, Torres married UPD psychology student Amaryllis "Amar" Tiglao, who at the time was unaware of his communist affiliation; it was only when they traveled to Russia in the early 1970s to study at the University of Moscow that she found out about his PKP membership upon their chance meeting with communist William J. Pomeroy and his Filipino wife Celia.

In 1972, when Nemenzo expressed his opposition to the PKP's support for Marcos's martial law declaration and in response created a splinter faction called the Marxist–Leninist Group (MLG), Torres was tasked by the PKP to eliminate the MLG's recruited members. According to historian Joseph Scalice, this purge of MLG members by the PKP killed more communist party members than was done by the Marcos government itself in the imposition of martial law.

After the establishment of the Institute of Labor and Manpower Studies (ILMS) under the Department of Labor in the mid-1970s, Torres was assigned by Marcos as its officer-in-charge, and by 1977 he allegedly left the PKP upon surrendering to Fidel V. Ramos.

=== Post-EDSA Revolution ===
Under President Corazon Aquino, he served as an undersecretary in the Department of Labor and Employment from 1989 to 1990. Afterwards he was promoted to full secretary, serving from 1990 to 1992. Under the next president, Fidel V. Ramos, he worked as executive secretary (colloquially known as the Little President) from 1995 to 1998. During this time, he co-hosted the television program Showbiz at Politika with Lani Mercado on RPN (now RPTV), and was instrumental in brokering a peace accord with the Muslim rebels in Mindanao. Torres ran for a Senate seat in the 1992 and 1998, under the banner of Lakas–CMD and Laban ng Makabayang Masang Pilipino, respectively, but lost.

He later served as Congressman of the 2nd District of Zambales from 2001 to 2004 in the House of Representatives. He served as president of the Trade Union Congress of the Philippines from 2015 to 2016 and is currently a columnist at The Manila Times.

== Biography ==
Torres was portrayed by Cesar Montano in the 1997 biographical action film Kadre: Ang Buhay ni Ka Ruben.
