= Land Reform Commission =

Government agency in Sri Lanka

The Land Reform Commission (LRC) is a government agency in Sri Lanka established in 1972 under the Land Reform Law No. 1 of 1972. The LRC was set up by the United Front government led by Prime Minister Sirimavo Bandaranaike to manage the land taken over by the government under the Land Reform Law in 1972 and 1975. As of 2021, the LRC owned 1,7 million acres of land.

== Land acquisitions ==
Following the formation of the LRC in late 1972, land in excess of the stipulated ceiling of 50 acres of cultivated land and 25 acres of paddy land was registered by owners. Of this 563,411 acres of land was acquired by the LRC within the first two years as part of the first phase. In the second phase of acquisition in 1975, under the Land Reform (Amendment) Law of 1975, allowed for the takeover of plantations owned by foreign companies, leading to a significant nationalisation of the plantation sector. LRC took over 417,957 acres; bringing the total acquired land by the LRC to 1,000,000 acres or 22% of the land under agriculture, making the LRC the single largest landowner in the country. LRC formed a Compensations Board to negotiated compensation for payment in cash or in reform bonds.

== Land distribution ==
Plantation estates were transferred to the State Plantation Corporation, People's Estate Development Board and the Up-Country Cooperative Estate under the State Agricultural Corporations Act of 1972; while some lands were given to Electoral Cooperatives and Land Reform Cooperatives. 12% of the land was distributed to landless by the LRC by the 1980s. A major program in land reform was Cooperative Settlements, which numbered around 165 across 48,000 acres, employing 17,000.

=== Land grants ===
Successive governments have utilized the LRC to provide land grants to the landless under the titles

- Swarnabhoomi land deeds
- Jayabhoomi land deeds
- Isurubhoomi land deeds
- Himikama land deeds

== See also ==
- Public Service Commission (Sri Lanka)
- Criminal Justice Commission (Sri Lanka)
- Official Languages Commission (Sri Lanka)
