= Antonio Diaz (Filipino politician) =

Antonio Magsaysay Diaz
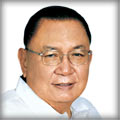

Member of the Philippine House of Representatives from Zambales's 2nd congressional district
- In office June 30, 2004 – August 3, 2011
- Preceded by: Ruben D. Torres
- Succeeded by: Hermogenes Omar C. Ebdane III
- In office June 30, 1992 – June 30, 2001
- Preceded by: Pacita T. Gonzalez
- Succeeded by: Ruben D. Torres

Member of the Batasang Pambansa from Zambales
- In office June 30, 1984 – March 25, 1986

Member of the Philippine House of Representatives from Zambales's at-large congressional district
- In office December 30, 1969 – September 23, 1972
- Preceded by: Ramon B. Magsaysay Jr.
- Succeeded by: Post Dissolved

Vice Governor of Zambales
- In office December 30, 1967 – December 30, 1969
- Governor: Vicente Magsaysay
- Preceded by: Quirico Abrajano
- Succeeded by: Tiburcio Edaño Jr.

Personal details
- Born: Antonio Magsaysay Diaz; September 6, 1927 Olongapo, Zambales, Philippine Islands
- Died: August 3, 2011 (aged 83) Quezon City, Philippines
- Party: Labor (2009–2011)
- Other political affiliations: Liberal (2004–2007); LAMMP (1998–2004); Lakas–CMD (1992–1998, 2007–2009); KBL (1984–1992); Nacionalista (1969–1984)
- Occupation: Politician
- Nickname: Tonias

Antonio Magsaysay Diaz (September 6, 1927 – August 3, 2011) was a politician and lawyer. He was elected to the House of Representatives of the Philippines representing Zambales for three separate tenures – 1969 to 1972, 1992 to 2001, and 2004 until his death on August 3, 2011.

== Early life ==
Diaz, a nephew of the late-president Ramon Magsaysay, member of the Magsaysay political clan of Zambales, was variously the vice governor and representative of the province since the 1960s.

Diaz obtained a law degree from the Ateneo de Manila University in 1954.

According to a statement from the family, Diaz gave the bulk of his pork barrel funds to his scholarship program which included the provision of tuition money and stipends to some 500,000 high school and college students not only in his district but in the entire province. In the last 10 years, Diaz allocated approximately P500 million for this program alone. Records from Diaz's office showed that public school students in the district receive at least P1,000 each a year while those in private schools get at least P4,000 each.

He made his career in government service, starting out as deputy customs commissioner (1963–1964), head of the legal department of the Land Reform Commission (1964–1965), and was subsequently elected vice governor of Zambales (1967–1969), before winning the first of many congressional terms in 1969. He was also a member of the Batasang Pambansa in 1984. Diaz's mother, Mercedes, is a sister of the late President Ramon Magsaysay.

== Personal life ==
He was married to Felmida V. Diaz with four children: Ramon Victor, Roderick Albert, Roberto Carlos and Rica Victoria, daughters-in-law Carla, Yveth, and Anna, son-in-law Ronald Arambulo and grandchildren Regina Isabel, Marianna Antonia, Bianca Alberta, Ricardo, Paquito, Rafael, Sabrina Victoria and Sidney Louise.

== Education ==
- Elementary: Castillejos Elementary School (1934–1940)
- High School: Letran College (1940–1950)
- College: Ateneo de Manila University; Associate in Arts, graduated magna cum laude (1952) and Bachelor of Laws (1954)

== Career history ==
- Professor of political science of Far Eastern University (1955–1957)
- Head executive assistant; Head, legal department of Land Reform Commission (1956–1958)
- Vice president of Federation of Free Farmers (1956–1957)
- Barangay captain of Santa Maria, Castillejos, Zambales (1958–1961)
- Chief executive assistant Department of Finance (1961–1963)
- Deputy commissioner, Bureau of Customs (1963–1964)
- Legal consultant, Benguet Consolidated Mining Corporation (1964–1966)
- Chairperson, PNB Provident Fund of Philippine National Bank (1966–1970)
- Provincial vice governor of Zambales (1967–1969)
- Director of Philippine National Railways (1967–1969)
- Representative, lone district, Zambales House of Representatives (1969–1972)
- Director and senior vice president, Philtrust Company (1978–1984)
- Representative of Batasang Pambansa (1984–1986)
- Deputy minister, Department of Tourism (1985–1986)
- Partner, Albano, Garcia, Diaz Law Office (1987–1992)
- Representative, 2nd district, Zambales House of Representatives (1992–2001; 2004–2010)

== Death ==
He died on August 3, 2011 (Wednesday) cause of multiple organ failure secondary to sepsis and pneumonia at St. Luke's Medical Center in Quezon City. He was 83. Teodoro Camat, who heads Diaz's office in Zambales’ 2nd congressional district, said the lawmaker died at 6:20 am. Camat said Diaz's body will be taken to the Iba Cathedral here on Saturday after necrological services at the House of Representatives. The body will then be transferred for the wake in his hometown at San Marcelino, Zambales.
