= 2011 Ilocos Sur's 1st congressional district special election =

2011 special election at Ilocos Sur's 1st congressional district
- May 28, 2011
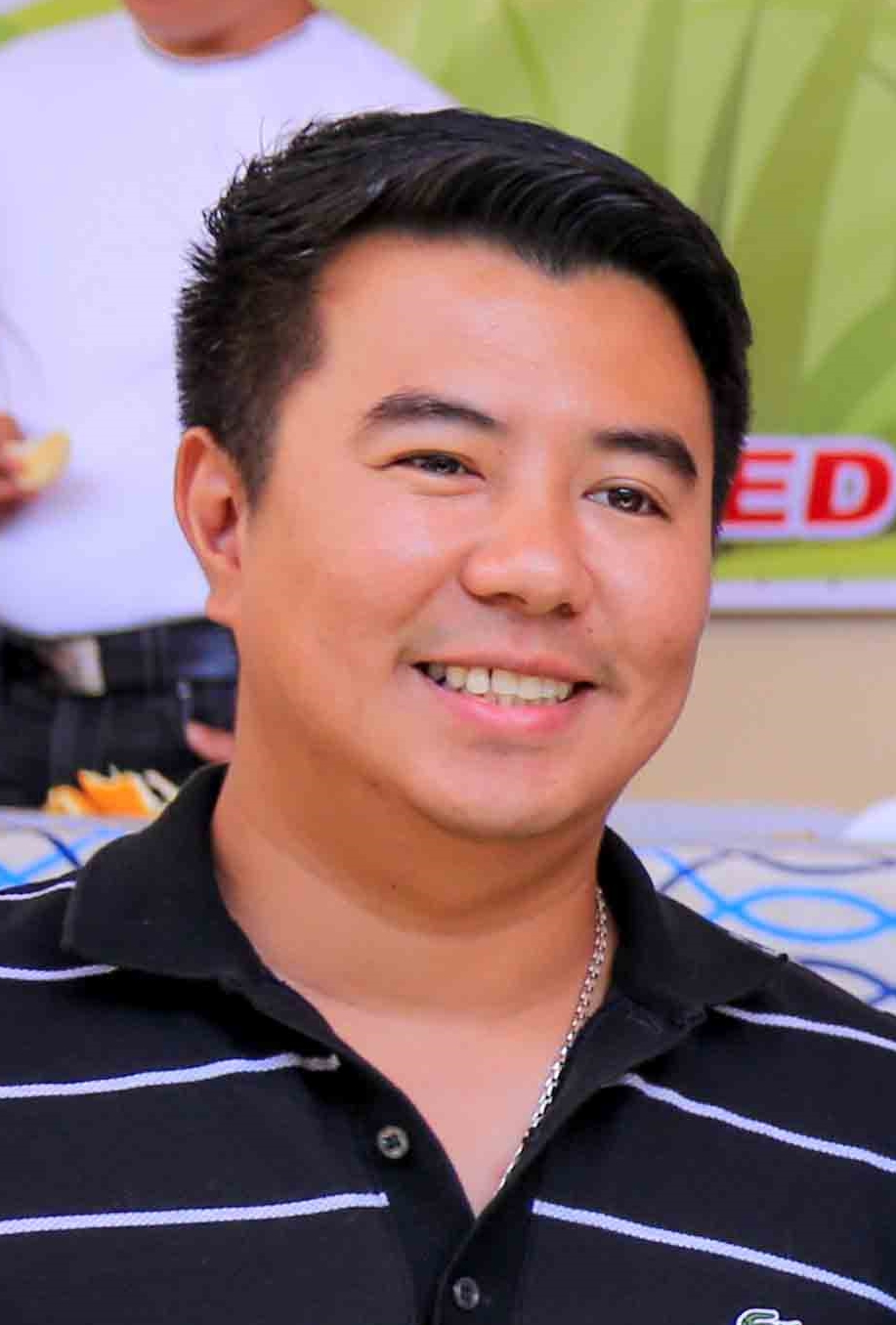

Candidate	Ryan Luis Singson	Trandy Baterina
Party	Biled	Liberal
Popular vote	71,995	30,445
Percentage	70.28	29.72
Representative before election
Ronald Singson
Lakas–Kampi
Representative-elect
Ryan Luis Singson
Biled

A special election for Ilocos Sur's 1st district seat in the House of Representatives of the Philippines was held on May 28, 2011, to fill the district's vacant seat for the remainder of the 15th Congress. The special election was called after incumbent representative Ronald Singson resigned on March 7, 2011, after being convicted of drug possession by the Wan Chai District Court in Hong Kong. Vigan vice mayor Ryan Luis Singson, the former representative's brother, won the election and served the remainder of his brother's term, which ended on June 30, 2013.

== Electoral system ==
The House of Representatives is elected via parallel voting system, with 80% of seats elected from congressional districts, and 20% from the party-list system. Each district sends one representative to the House of Representatives. An election to the seat is via first-past-the-post, in which the candidate with the most votes, whether or not one has a majority, wins the seat.

Based on Republic Act (RA) No. 6645, in order for a special election to take place, the seat must be vacated, the relevant chamber notifies the Commission on Elections (COMELEC) the existence of a vacancy, then the COMELEC schedules the special election. There is a dispute in the procedure as a subsequent law, RA No. 7166, supposedly amended the procedure, bypassing the need for official communication from the relevant chamber of the vacancy. The COMELEC has always waited on official communication from the relevant chamber before scheduling a special election.

Meanwhile, according to RA No. 8295, should only one candidate file to run in the special election, the COMELEC will declare that candidate as the winner and will no longer hold the election.

== Background ==
Incumbent representative Ronald Singson of Lakas Kampi CMD won the general election on May 10, 2010. His term began on June 30, but he was arrested in Hong Kong on July 11, a few days before the 15th Congress convened, for trafficking of illegal drugs. Singson was convicted on a lesser charge of drug possession on February 25, 2011, and resigned the next month, which was accepted by the Speaker Feliciano Belmonte, Jr.

The Commission on Elections set the election on May 28, 2011, Saturday. The period for the filing of certificates of candidacy was from May 9 to 13, and the campaign period would be from May 14 to 26. Unlike the general election, the special election will be conducted manually.

Initial speculation on the candidates centered on incumbent governor and Ronald's father Chavit Singson and his political opponent Efren Rafanan of the Pwersa ng Masang Pilipino (PMP) as the elder Singson defeated Rafanan in the 2010 gubernatorial election. President Benigno Aquino III's Liberal Party screened potential candidates as Trandy Baterina, the younger Singson's congressional opponent in 2010 was no longer interested in running. Meanwhile, Singson's local party Biled selected Vigan vice mayor Ryan Singson, Chavit's son and Ronald's brother as their candidate. On mid-May, Baterina filed his certificate of candidacy as the Liberal Party's candidate, accompanied by his father Ben, and Rafanan.

=== District profile ===
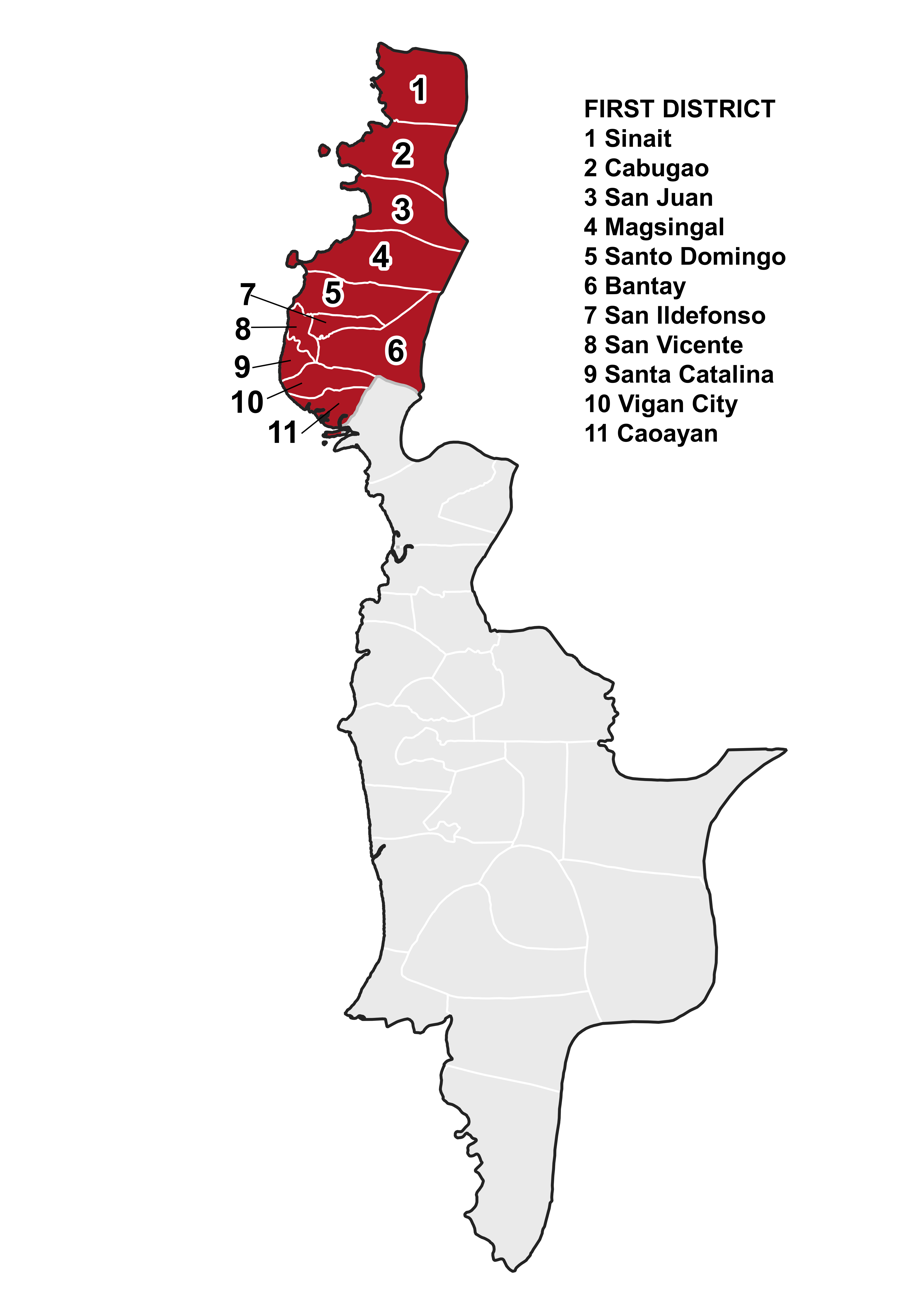
Ilocos Sur's 1st congressional district

Ilocos Sur's 1st congressional district includes northern Ilocos Sur, or all of the province north of Santa and the Lagben River.

== Candidates ==
1. Trandy Baterina (Liberal), businessman
2. Ryan Luis Singson (Biled), vice mayor of Vigan

== Campaign ==
The Liberal Party was split in the election: the Liberals endorsed Baterina, but their Ilocos Sur chair, Francisco Ranches Jr., personally backed Singson; he added that Baterina would be running as an independent candidate as the party nomination was not submitted to the commission on time. Rafanan, Baterina's campaign manager, countered that they got the party nomination and submitted it to the commission on time. At the eve of the election, both candidates' campaigns claim they have the endorsement of the Liberal Party.

== Results ==
2011 Ilocos Sur's 1st congressional district special election
Candidate	Party	Votes	%
Ryan Luis Singson	Biled Party	71,995	70.28
Trandy Baterina	Liberal Party	30,445	29.72
Total		102,440	100.00
Valid votes		102,440	99.96
Invalid/blank votes		42	0.04
Total votes		102,482	100.00
Registered voters/turnout		161,975	63.27
Majority		41,550	40.56
Biled Party gain from Lakas Kampi CMD			

The Parish Pastoral Council for Responsible Voting (PPCRV) reported that the election was peaceful but there were reports of rampant vote-buying and barangay officials were entering the polling precincts. The PPCRV reported that the reason for the peacefulness was that the people already knew who will win, while refusing to name which campaign was buying votes. Chairman Sixto Brillantes, whose commission targeted an election turnout between 55 and 60%, was worried on the turnout, but noted that the election was honest and orderly. Initial figures pointed to a turnout of between 55 and 65%; the low turnout was blamed on the number of disputed posts (1), as opposed in a general election where families voted together. Another reason was that voters had not been given "incentives" to vote, such as free gasoline.

Meanwhile, the National Citizen's Movement for Free Elections (NAMFREL) reported inclement weather as a reason behind low voter turnout. NAMFREL also noted rampant vote buying, citing observations from its volunteers in Vigan that barangay representatives, supposedly non-partisan, were handing cash in exchange for votes, with ₱3,000 (equivalent to ₱3,986 in 2021) being given to barangay captains, ₱2,000 (equivalent to ₱2,657 in 2021) to barangay councilors (kagawad), and ₱250 (equivalent to ₱332.13 in 2021) to heads of families, calling such as money-politics and condemning it. After the conduct of the special polls, NAMFREL also released a parallel count with Singson in the lead.

NAMFREL tally
Party	Candidate	Total votes	Vigan City	Cabugao	Magsingal	San Juan	Sta. Catalina	Sto. Domingo	Sinait	Bantay	Caoayan	San Vicente	San Ildefonso
Biled	Ryan Luis Singson	69,982	13,742	8,328	6,805	6,272	2,831	6,297	7,176	7,303	6,253	2,783	2,192
Liberal	Trandy Baterina	30,287	3,286	4,323	2,095	3,752	1,849	4,431	3,632	2,954	2,063	1,243	659
% of election returns tallied		98.96%	100%	100%	100%	100%	100%	100%	95.08%	100%	94.74%	95.83%	100%

The Ilocos Sur Provincial Board of Canvassers proclaimed Singson as the winner on May 29. Singson credited his party's machinery and his party mates for the victory; the position of vice mayor of Vigan will be taken over by Lourdes Baquiran, the councilor with the most votes in the 2010 city council election, with the vacancy on the council to be filled by someone from their party. The turnout was described as "good" by the city election officer, noting that only 60% of the voters generally cast their votes in special elections.

Representative-elect Singson was sworn into office on May 30 at the House of Representatives with his family and Sarangani Representative Manny Pacquiao with him at the rostrum. Singson said that they have no national political affiliation yet.

== Aftermath ==
Ronald Singson returned to the Philippines on January 14, 2012. He ran in the 2013 elections and faced Baterina anew; the latter petitioned the Commission on Elections to disqualify Singson due to his conviction. Ronald won the congressional race, while Ryan Luis the governorship. Term limited in 2016, Deogracias Victor Savellano won the open seat. Savellano, who was Ryan Luis's father-in-law, went up against Ronald in 2022. The Singson brothers became estranged, with Ryan Luis set to face his father Chavit for the Ilocos Sur vice-gubernatorial race in 2022, but withdrew. Savellano then lost to Ronald in the congressional race. Ronald Singson defended the seat in 2025.

== 2010 election result ==
2010 Philippine House of Representative election at Ilocos Sur's 1st district
Candidate	Party	Votes	%
Ronald Singson	Lakas–Kampi–CMD	91,875	72.27
Trandy Baterina	Liberal Party	35,254	27.73
Total		127,129	100.00
Valid votes		127,129	90.94
Invalid/blank votes		12,660	9.06
Total votes		139,789	100.00
Majority		56,621	44.54
Lakas–Kampi–CMD hold			

== See also ==
- 1913 Ilocos Sur's 1st legislative district special election
