= Erico Aumentado =

Filipino politician from Bohol

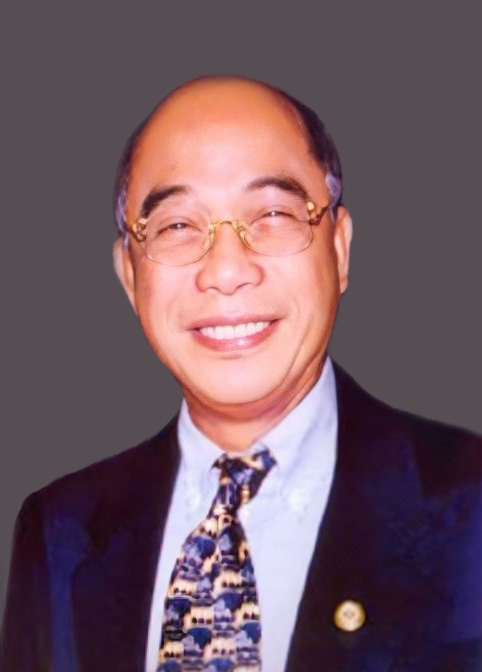

Member of the Philippine House of Representatives from Bohol's 2nd congressional district
- In office June 30, 2010 – December 25, 2012
- Preceded by: Roberto Cajes
- Succeeded by: Erico Aristotle Aumentado
- In office June 30, 1992 – June 30, 2001
- Preceded by: David B. Tirol
- Succeeded by: Roberto Cajes

24th Governor of Bohol
- In office June 30, 2001 – June 30, 2010
- Vice Governor: Julius Caesar Herrera
- Preceded by: Rene L. Relampagos
- Succeeded by: Edgardo Chatto

Vice Governor of Bohol
- In office 1988–1992
- Governor: Constancio Chatto Torralba
- Preceded by: Leopoldo Blanco Jr. (OIC)
- Succeeded by: Rene L. Relampagos

Member of the Bohol Provincial Board
- In office 1967–1986

Personal details
- Born: Erico Boyles Aumentado; May 18, 1940 Ubay, Bohol, Philippines
- Died: December 25, 2012 (aged 72) Taguig, Philippines
- Resting place: Victoria Memorial Park; Tagbilaran, Bohol
- Party: NPC (2012)
- Other political affiliations: Independent (2010-2012); Lakas–CMD (1991-2010); Nacionalista (1967-1980)
- Spouse: Peregrina Adlaon Cabagnot - Aumentado
- Children: Razel Aumentado - Villamor; Rica Reina Aumentado; Rizalea Aumentado - Dolores; Erico Aumentado Jr. Rainelda Aumentado - Ramo; Erico Angelo Aumentado, III; Charina Aumentado - Jones; Erico Aristotle Aumentado, IV
- Occupation: Politician
- Profession: Lawyer, Journalist

Erico Boyles Aumentado (May 18, 1940 – December 25, 2012) was a former governor, vice governor, and senior provincial board member of Bohol, and congressman and deputy speaker of the Philippine House of Representatives. He is the first governor of Bohol who served for three consecutive terms (2001-2010).

== Early life and education ==
Erico B. Aumentado was born in Fatima, Ubay, Bohol on May 18, 1940.

He finished his elementary education at Ubay Central Elementary School and finished his high school at Holy Child Academy in Ubay, Bohol both as class valedictorian.

Granted with full scholarship, he completed his Pre-law A.B. at the Rafael Palma College (now University of Bohol) and graduated magna cum laude, the highest honor during that time in 1960. He earned his Bachelor of Laws at the same school and finished Cum Laude. He passed the Philippine Bar Examination in 1964. He also became a faculty member of RPC College of Law, and lectures on Constitutional Law and Human Rights.

During his life as a student, he was elected as Chairman of the Student Council Association of the Philippines National Convention in 1961. He served as the vice president of College Editors’ Guild of the Philippines (CEGP) and chairman of CEGP - Visayas Region from 1961-63. He received the Mitra Medal Award been an outstanding student journalist and editor-in-chief of The Collegian (now The Varsitarian) from 1958-1961, the official student publication of the Rafael Palma College.

While studying, he also worked as a staff member of the Bohol Chronicle in 1959 and later promoted as a columnist under his regular column named, “Between Extremes”. He was then hired as the provincial correspondent of the nation's leading newspapers, The Manila Times and of the People's Journal.

== Political career ==
It was the former president Carlos P. Garcia inspired Aumentado to enter into politics in 1967. At age 27, he became the youngest provincial board member when he was elected in 1967. In 1988, he was elected as vice governor of Bohol. In 1992, he was elected as representative of Bohol's 2nd District and served for three consecutive terms until 2001. Aumentado became a Deputy Speaker in the House of Representatives at 11th Congress from 2000 to 2001. He also held the chairmanship of Ethics and Privileges Committee and a consistent member for the minority of the committees such as Agriculture and Food; Appropriations; Basic Education and Culture; Constitutional Amendments; Good Government and Public Accountability; Local Government; Public Works and Highways; Suffrage and Electoral Reforms; Tourism; Transportation; and Ways and Means.

He was the governor of Bohol for three consecutive terms (2001-2010), chairman of both the Regional Development Council and the Regional Tourism Council of Central Visayas, and National President of the League of Provinces of the Philippines (LPP) and the Union of Local Authorities of the Philippines (ULAP), the umbrella organization of the 1.5M local officials of the Philippines. He is the 1st Boholano ever elected to these positions.

After his stint as governor, he was elected in the 2010 elections for representative of the Congress in 2010 until his death in 2012. He was succeeded by his son 7 months after his death.

== Passed Bills ==
- Limited Portability Scheme (RA 7699)
- Philippine Health Insurance Corporation Act of 1995 (RA 7875)
- Agricultural Tariffication Act of 1998 (RA 8555)
- GSIS Act of 1997 (RA 8291)
- Agricultural and Fisheries Modernization Act of 1998 (RA 8178)
- Home Guaranty Corporation Act of 2000 (RA 8763)
- Fair Election Act (RA 9006)

== Awards and recognition ==
- Outstanding Student Leader Rafael Palma College (now University of Bohol), 1959 – 1961.
- Pres. Garcia Gold Medal Award in Oratory given by Pres. Carlos P. Garcia, 1961.
- Cabangbang Gold Medal (Best Debater) Award, RPC vs. Southwestern University, 1961.
- Silver Medal Award, RPC Battle of Champions Oratorical Contest, 1962.
- Mitra Gold Medal Award, Editorial Writing, News Writing & Feature Writing, given by Sen. Ramon Mitra Jr., 1963.
- Don Tirso Uytengsu Award (First Prize) in General Reporting given by the Federation of Provincial Press Clubs of the Philippines (FPPCP), 1966.
- Outstanding Lawyer, awarded by the Citizen’s Legal Aid Society of the Philippines (CLASP), 1974.
- Outstanding Alumnus Award for Civil Affairs, University of Bohol, 1976.
- Columnist of the Year Award, given by the Bohol Association of Writers and Radio Announcers (AWRA),1988–1989.
- Plaque of Recognition for his invaluable service and dedication to the ideals and objectives of the Integrated Bar of the Philippines (IBP), given by the IBP – Bohol Chapter, 1993.
- Top 15 Legislators, Philippine House of Representatives, 1994.
- Most Outstanding Congressman given by the University of the Philippines - Local Government Center, Department of the Interior and Local Government and by the Local Administrator Development Program, 1993-1994.
- Ten Outstanding Congressmen, Philippine House of Representatives 1995.
- Top Ten Performing Members in the 10th Congress, Philippine House of Representatives, by the Philippine News Agency, 1997.
- Top Ten Outstanding Congressional Achiever, 11th Congress, Philippine House of Representatives, 2000.
- Most Outstanding Boholano Achiever chosen by the Bohol Association in Metro Manila, Inc., 2000
- Plaque of Recognition for his meritorious achievement and monumental accomplishments as the Province of Bohol’s Representative of the Second District and as Deputy Speaker of the Philippine House of Representatives’ 11th Congress, 2001.
- Konrad Adenauer Medal of Excellence (KAME), given by Konrad-Adenauer-Stiftung (KAS) Philippines and administered by the Local Government Development Foundation (LOGODEF), 2006.
- Tourism Award, Rotary Club of Manila, 2007-2008.

Political offices
Preceded by Leopoldo Blanco Jr. (OIC)	Vice Governor, Province of Bohol; 1988–1992	Succeeded by Rene Relampagos
Preceded by Rene Relampagos	Governor, Province of Bohol; 2001–2010	Succeeded by Edgar Chatto
House of Representatives of the Philippines
Preceded by David B. Tirol	Representative, 2nd District of Bohol; 1992–2001	Succeeded by Roberto Cajes
Preceded by Roberto Cajes	Representative, 2nd District of Bohol; 2010–2012	Succeeded by Erico Aristotle Aumentado
