= List of senators elected in the 2007 Philippine Senate election =

The 2007 Senate election in the Philippines occurred on May 14, 2007 to elect one-half of the Senate. The senators elected in 2007, together with those elected in 2004, comprise the Senate's delegation in the 14th Congress.

== Manner of election ==
Voting for senators is via nationwide, at-large basis via plurality-at-large voting system. A voter has twelve votes: the voter can vote less than twelve but not more than it. Then votes are tallied nationwide and the twelve candidates with the highest number of votes are elected to the Senate. The Commission on Elections administers elections for the Senate, with the Senate Electoral Tribunal deciding election disputes after a Senator has taken office.

== Senators elected in 2007 ==
- Key: Boldface: incumbent, italicized: neophyte senator

Rank	Image	Senator	Party	Coalition	Voted at*	Date proclaimed	Religion	Prior congressional and elective executive positions	Born
1st		Loren Legarda	NPC	Genuine Opposition	Malabon	June 3, 2007	Roman Catholicism	Senator (1998–2004)	1960
2nd		Francis Escudero	NPC	Genuine Opposition	Sorsogon City, Sorsogon	June 6, 2007	Roman Catholicism	Member of the House of Representatives from Sorsogon's 1st district (1998–2007)	1969
3rd		**Panfilo Lacson**	UNO	Genuine Opposition	Imus, Cavite	June 3, 2007	Roman Catholicism	Senator (2001–2007)	1948
4th		**Manny Villar**	Nacionalista	Genuine Opposition	Las Piñas	June 3, 2007	Roman Catholicism	Senator (2001–2007), member of the House of Representatives from Las Piñas' district (1992–2001; Speaker, 1998–2000)	1949
5th		**Kiko Pangilinan**	Liberal	None	Quezon City	June 3, 2007	Evangelical Christianity	Senator (2001–2007)	1963
6th		Benigno Aquino III	Liberal	Genuine Opposition	Tarlac City, Tarlac	June 6, 2007	Roman Catholicism	Member of the House of Representatives from Tarlac's 2nd district (1998–2007)	1960
7th		**Edgardo Angara**	LDP	TEAM Unity	Baler, Aurora	June 6, 2007	Roman Catholicism	Senator (1987–1998, 2001–2007; Senate President, 1993–1995)	1934
8th		**Joker Arroyo**	KAMPI	TEAM Unity	Makati	June 6, 2007	Roman Catholicism	Senator (2001–2007), member of the House of Representatives from Makati's 1st district (1992–2001)	1927
9th		Alan Peter Cayetano	Nacionalista	Genuine Opposition	Taguig	June 6, 2007	Evangelical Christianity	Member of the House of Representatives from Taguig and Pateros's district (1998–2007)	1970
10th		Gregorio Honasan	Independent	None	Marikina	June 6, 2007	Roman Catholicism	Senator (1995–2004)	1948
11th		Antonio Trillanes	UNO	Genuine Opposition	Caloocan	June 15, 2007	Roman Catholicism		1971
12th		Koko Pimentel	PDP–Laban	Genuine Opposition	Cagayan de Oro	August 11, 2011	Roman Catholicism		1964

*Senators are elected on a nationwide, at-large basis.

^{a} ^{b} Pimentel was declared the winner after the Senate Electoral Tribunal ruled in favor of his electoral protest against Zubiri, who had resigned in August 3, 2011.

== Changes ==
These are the changes in membership after the proclamation of winners:

Party	Former representative	Left office	Cause	Special election	Party	New representative	Took office
Liberal	Benigno Aquino III	June 30, 2010	Left office after election as president	None	To be filled at the 2013 election.		
Independent	Juan Miguel Zubiri	August 3, 2011	Resignation	None	PDP–Laban	Koko Pimentel	August 15, 2011
