= Dagohoy =

The name Dagohoy may refer to:

- Dagohoy, Bohol, a town in Bohol, Philippines
- Dagohoy rebellion, the longest revolt or rebellion in Philippine history (1744-1829)
- Francisco Dagohoy, real name Francisco Sendrijas, the individual who led the Dagohoy Revolt
