= List of sister cities in the Philippines =

This is a list of Philippine twin towns, sister cities and other international relationships. In most cases, the association, especially when formalized by local government, is known as "town twinning" or "sister cities", and while most of the places included are cities, it also includes municipalities, provinces and a region.

The list is arranged by regions and then by provinces and then cities and municipalities. See also the lists of twin towns and sister cities.

== Regions ==
=== M ===
- Metro Manila

Shanghai, China

== Provinces ==
=== A ===
- Albay

Lanzhou, China

=== B ===
- Benguet

Kōchi Prefecture, Japan

- Bohol

Jiangxi, China

=== C ===
- Cebu

Hainan, China
Saint Petersburg, Russia, since 2010; Renewed in June 2024

=== I ===
- Ilocos Norte

Shandong, China

- Ilocos Sur
- Isabela

=== L ===
- Laguna

Fujian, China

- Leyte

Hubei, China

=== N ===
- Nueva Ecija

Anhui, China

=== P ===
- Pangasinan

=== R ===
- Rizal

New Taipei, Taiwan

=== Z ===
- Zambales

Maui County, Hawaii, United States

== Cities ==
=== A ===
- Angeles City

Las Vegas, Nevada, United States

=== B ===
- Bacolod

Andong, South Korea, since 2008
Keelung, Taiwan
Long Beach, California, United States
Singaraja, Indonesia, since 2008

- Baguio

Bacarra, Ilocos Norte, Philippines, since 2012
(Peru) Cusco, Perú
Dalaguete, Cebu, Philippines, since 2012
Hangzhou, Zhejiang, China
Hanyū, Saitama, Japan
Honolulu, Hawaii, United States, since 1995
Kislovodsk, Stavropol Krai, Russia
Libon, Albay, Philippines, since 2012
Pudtol, Apayao, Philippines, since 2012
San Antonio, Texas, United States, since 2022
Taebaek, South Korea
Vallejo, California, United States
Vaughan, Ontario, Canada
Wakkanai, Hokkaido, Japan

=== C ===
- Cagayan de Oro

Gwangyang, South Korea, since October 29, 2012
Harbin, Heilongjiang, China
Norfolk, Virginia, United States
Tainan City, Taiwan, since September 9, 2005

- Calamba

Guri, South Korea
Litoměřice, Czech Republic
Walnut, California, United States
Wilhelmsfeld, Baden-Württemberg, Germany

- Cavite City

San Diego, California, United States
Tainan City, Taiwan, since August 16, 1980

- Cebu City

Chula Vista, California, United States
Honolulu, Hawaii, United States, since 1990
Sabrosa, Portugal (Note: But not according Portuguese reference)
Seattle, Washington, United States
Xiamen, China
Yeosu, South Korea
Guadalajara, Mexico
(Russia) Vladivostok, Russian Federation, Since September 2022
(Russia) Moscow, Russian Federation, August 2024-2027

- Cotabato City

Quezon City, Philippines
Bandung, Indonesia

=== D ===
- Dagupan

Iwata, Shizuoka, Japan
Milpitas, California, United States

- Dapitan

Litoměřice, Czech Republic

- Davao City

Guangxi Zhuang Autonomous Region, China
Bacoor, Cavite, Philippines
Bitung, Indonesia
Quezon City, Philippines
Tacoma, Washington, United States

- Dipolog

Yancheng District, Kaohsiung City, Taiwan (2018)

- Dumaguete

Yeongdong County, South Korea
Alameda, California, United States

=== I ===
- Iloilo City

Dededo, Guam, since 1994
Qingdao, Shandong, China, since 2003
Quezon City, Philippines, since 1994
Stockton, California, United States, since 1956
Yulin, Guangxi, China, since 2011
Bilbao, Spain

=== L ===
- La Carlota

Carson, California, United States

- Laoag

Honolulu, Hawaii, United States, since 1969
Laibin, China

- Lapu-Lapu

Sanya, China

- Las Piñas
- Legazpi

Chōshi, Chiba, Japan
Hengyang, China
(United States) Beaumont, Texas, USA

- Lipa

Fremont, California, United States
Fushun, China

=== M ===
- Makati, Malabon, Manila, Mandaluyong, Marikina, and Muntinlupa
- Malolos

Bayambang, Philippines
Hagåtña, Guam

- Mandaue

Bacău, Romania
Zibo, Shandong, China

=== N ===
- Naga

Shishi City, Fujian, China

=== O ===
- Olongapo

National City, California, United States

- Ozamiz

Jersey City, New Jersey, United States, since December 13, 1995

=== P ===
- Pagadian

Cooma, New South Wales, Australia

- Parañaque, Pasig, and Pasay
- Puerto Princesa

Beihai, China
Maui County, Hawaii, United States, since 1999 as a Friendship City
Wuxi, China
Quezon City, Philippines

=== Q ===
- Quezon City

=== R ===
- Roxas City

Quezon City, Philippines
San Bernardino, California, United States
Guam, United States
Balıkesir, Turkey

=== S ===
- San Juan
- Santo Tomas City

Pinamalayan, Philippines

- Silay

Amagi, Kagoshima, Japan

- Sorsogon City

Ceuta, Spain
Legazpi, Philippines
Iloilo City, Philippines
Pasay, Philippines
Sterling Heights, Michigan, United States
Zamboanga City, Philippines

=== T ===
- Tacloban

Fukuyama, Hiroshima, Japan

- Tagaytay

Rohnert Park, California, United States
Tainan City, Taiwan, since August 16, 1980

- Tagbilaran

Iligan, Philippines, since June 2011
Makati, Philippines, since July 2009
Puerto Princesa, Philippines, since February 2017
Zumarraga, Gipuzkoa, Spain, since 1993

- Trece Mártires

Tainan City, Taiwan, since August 16, 1980

- Tuguegarao

San Juan City, Philippines

=== U ===
- Urdaneta

Ordizia, Spain

=== V ===
- Valenzuela
- Vigan

Honolulu, Hawaii, United States, since 2003

=== Z ===
- Zamboanga City

Zaragoza, Spain
Sandakan, Sabah, Malaysia

== Municipalities ==
=== A ===
- Alimodian, Iloilo

Santa Rosa, Laguna Philippines

- Alicia, Isabela

Quezon City, Philippines

=== B ===
- Bacarra, Ilocos Norte

Maui County, Hawaii, United States, since 1970

- Badoc, Ilocos Norte

Maui County, Hawaii, United States, since 2010

- Balatan, Camarines Sur

Makati, Philippines

- Banaybanay, Davao Oriental

Quezon City, Philippines

- Bangued, Abra

Vigan, Ilocos Sur, Philippines

- Bauang, La Union

Lakewood, Washington, United States

- Baybay, Leyte

Union City, California, United States

- Bayombong, Nueva Vizcaya

Gonohe, Aomori, Japan

- Bolinao, Pangasinan

Mobile, Alabama, United States

=== C ===
- Cabugao, Ilocos Sur

Hawaii County, Hawaii, United States, since 2017
Maui County, Hawaii, United States, since 2005

- Camiling, Tarlac

Juneau, Alaska, United States

=== D ===
- Danao, Bohol

La Trinidad, Benguet, Philippines

=== F ===
- Famy, Laguna

Makati, Philippines

=== G ===
- General Trias

Tozawa, Yamagata, Japan

=== I ===
- Infanta, Quezon

Makati, Philippines

- Itogon, Benguet

Makati, Philippines

=== K ===
- Kalibo, Aklan

Juneau, Alaska, United States

- Kawit, Cavite

Sakegawa, Yamagata, Japan

=== L ===
- La Trinidad, Benguet

Danao, Bohol, Philippines
Hitachiōta, Ibaraki, Japan
Quezon City, Philippines
Miyako, Iwate, Japan

=== N ===
- Naguilian, La Union

Suisun City, California, United States

=== P ===
- Palo, Leyte

Palo Alto, California, United States

- Pura, Tarlac

Quezon City, Philippines

- Pinamalayan, Oriental Mindoro

Santo Tomas City, Philippines

- Sadanga, Mountain Province

Quezon City, Philippines

- San Juan, Ilocos Sur

Maui County, Hawaii, United States, since 1991 as a Friendship City

- San Nicolas, Ilocos Norte

Maui County, Hawaii, United States, since 2006

- Santa, Ilocos Sur

Maui County, Hawaii, United States, since 1991 as a Friendship City

- Sariaya, Quezon

Santa Clarita, California, United States

- Sarrat, Ilocos Norte

Maui County, Hawaii, United States, since 2006

=== T ===
- Tanza, Cavite

Geumsan-gun, South Korea

== See also ==
- Lists of twin towns and sister cities
- List of twin towns and sister cities in Asia
- List of sister cities in Metro Manila
