= List of sister cities in Metro Manila =

This is a list of the twin towns, sister cities and other international relationships of Metro Manila, composed of cities with which the National Capital Region of the Philippines, Metro Manila and its local government units are twinned geographically and politically, with the goal of fostering human contact and cultural interchange.

== Region ==
The following cities have been declared twin towns and sister cities of the capital region.

=== M ===
- Metro Manila

Shanghai, China, since 1983

== Cities ==
The following cities have been declared twin towns and sister cities of the capital city and surrounding local government units in Metro Manila.

=== C ===
- Caloocan

(Philippines) Calamba, Laguna
Malabon, Philippines
(Philippines) San Jose Del Monte, Bulacan
Incheon, South Korea

=== L ===
Las Piñas
Sochi, Russia
Ufa, Russia

=== M ===
- Makati

Balatan, Camarines Sur, Philippines
Cluj-Napoca, Romania
Famy, Laguna, Philippines
Infanta, Quezon, Philippines
Itogon, Benguet, Philippines
Los Angeles, California, United States, since 1992
Vladivostok, Primorsky Krai, Russia

- Malabon

Jung District, Daejeon, South Korea

- Mandaluyong

Legazpi, Albay, Philippines
Silay, Negros Occidental, Philippines
Tagum, Davao del Norte, Philippines
Alaminos, Laguna, Philippines

- Manila

Acapulco, Mexico, since 1969
Beijing, China, since 2005
(Timor-Leste) Dili, East Timor
Guangzhou, China
Haifa, Israel
Honolulu, Hawaii, United States, since 1980
Maui County, Hawaii, United States, as a Friendship city since 1994
Moscow, Russia
Montreal, Quebec, Canada, since 2005
Nantan, Kyoto, Japan
Sacramento, California, United States
Saipan, Northern Mariana Islands
San Francisco, California, United States
Taipei, Taiwan
Takatsuki, Osaka, Japan
Warsaw, Poland
Winnipeg, Manitoba, Canada, since 1979
Yokohama, Japan

- Marikina

Alaminos, Pangasinan, Philippines
Bacolod City, Philippines, since 1997
Brampton, Ontario, Canada, as a Friendship city since 2005
Davao City, Philippines, since 2018
Iloilo City, Philippines
Pendleton, Oregon, United States, since 1971
Sakai, Ibaraki, Japan, since 2017
Yeongdo District, Busan, South Korea, as a Friendship city since 2012

- Muntinlupa

Liuzhou, China
Piteşti, Romania
Staffanstorp, Sweden
Takasaki, Gunma, Japan
Carson, California, United States

=== P ===
- Parañaque

Haeundae, South Korea, since 2015
Carson, California, United States, since 2018

- Pasay

Jecheon, South Korea
Tainan City, Taiwan, since September 10, 1980
Union City, California, United States

- Pasig

Marugame, Kagawa, Japan
South San Francisco, California, United States

=== Q ===
- Quezon City

Alicia, Isabela, Philippines
Banaybanay, Davao Oriental, Philippines
Chiba City, Chiba, Japan
Cotabato City, Philippines
Davao City, Philippines
General Santos, Philippines
Iloilo City, Philippines
Kenosha, Wisconsin, United States
La Trinidad, Benguet, Philippines
Maui County, Hawaii, United States, since 1970
Naga, Camarines Sur, Philippines
New Westminster, British Columbia, Canada
Puerto Princesa, Philippines
Pura, Tarlac, Philippines
Sadanga, Mountain Province, Philippines
Salt Lake City, Utah, United States
Shenyang, China
Taipei, Taiwan
Wao, Lanao del Sur, Philippines

=== S ===
- San Juan

Maui County, Hawaii, United States, since 1991 as a Friendship City
Santa Barbara, California, United States
(Philippines) Tuguegarao City, Cagayan Province

=== T ===
- Taguig

(Philippines) Bacolod, Negros Occidental
(Philippines) Bago, Negros Occidental
Ballymoney, United Kingdom
(Philippines) Bangued, Abra
(Philippines) Bay, Laguna
Blacktown, Australia
Bluefields, Nicaragua
(Philippines) Boston, Davao Oriental
(Philippines) Buhi, Camarines Sur
(Philippines) Cabusao, Camarines Sur
(Philippines) Catarman, Camiguin
Carson, California, United States
(Philippines) Conner, Apayao
Corpus Christi, Texas, United States
(Philippines) Dumangas, Iloilo
Entebbe, Uganda
Gaoyou, China
(Philippines) Garcia Hernandez, Bohol
Goyang, South Korea
(Philippines) Gumaca, Quezon
Hangzhou, China
(Philippines) Hernani, Eastern Samar
(Philippines) Himamaylan, Negros Occidental
(Philippines) Iloilo City, Iloilo
(Philippines) Juban, Sorsogon
(Philippines) Lamut, Ifugao
(Philippines) Maasin, Iloilo
(Philippines) Maitum, Sarangani
(Philippines) Magdiwang, Romblon
(Philippines) Nabua, Camarines Sur
(Philippines) Ormoc, Leyte
(Philippines) Oton, Iloilo
(Philippines) Pateros, Metro Manila
(Philippines) Polangui, Albay
(Philippines) Poro, Cebu
(Philippines) San Francisco, Cebu
San Francisco, Zulia, Venezuela
(Philippines) Sipocot, Camarines Sur
(Philippines) Tabaco, Albay
Tainan, Taiwan
(Philippines) Tagbilaran, Bohol
(Philippines) Talakag, Bukidnon
(Philippines) Tinambac, Camarines Sur
(Philippines) Tingloy, Batangas
(Philippines) Valencia, Bukidnon
(Philippines) Vigan, Ilocos Sur

=== V ===
- Valenzuela

Bucheon, South Korea, since June 25, 2008
Bustos, Bulacan, Philippines
Kauai, Hawaii, United States

== Municipality ==
=== P ===
- Pateros

Pateros, Washington, United States, since 2013

[top]

== See also ==
- Lists of twin towns and sister cities
- List of twin towns and sister cities in Asia
- List of sister cities in the Philippines
