= Danao, Bohol =

Municipality in Bohol, Philippines

Danao
- Municipality
- Municipality of Danao
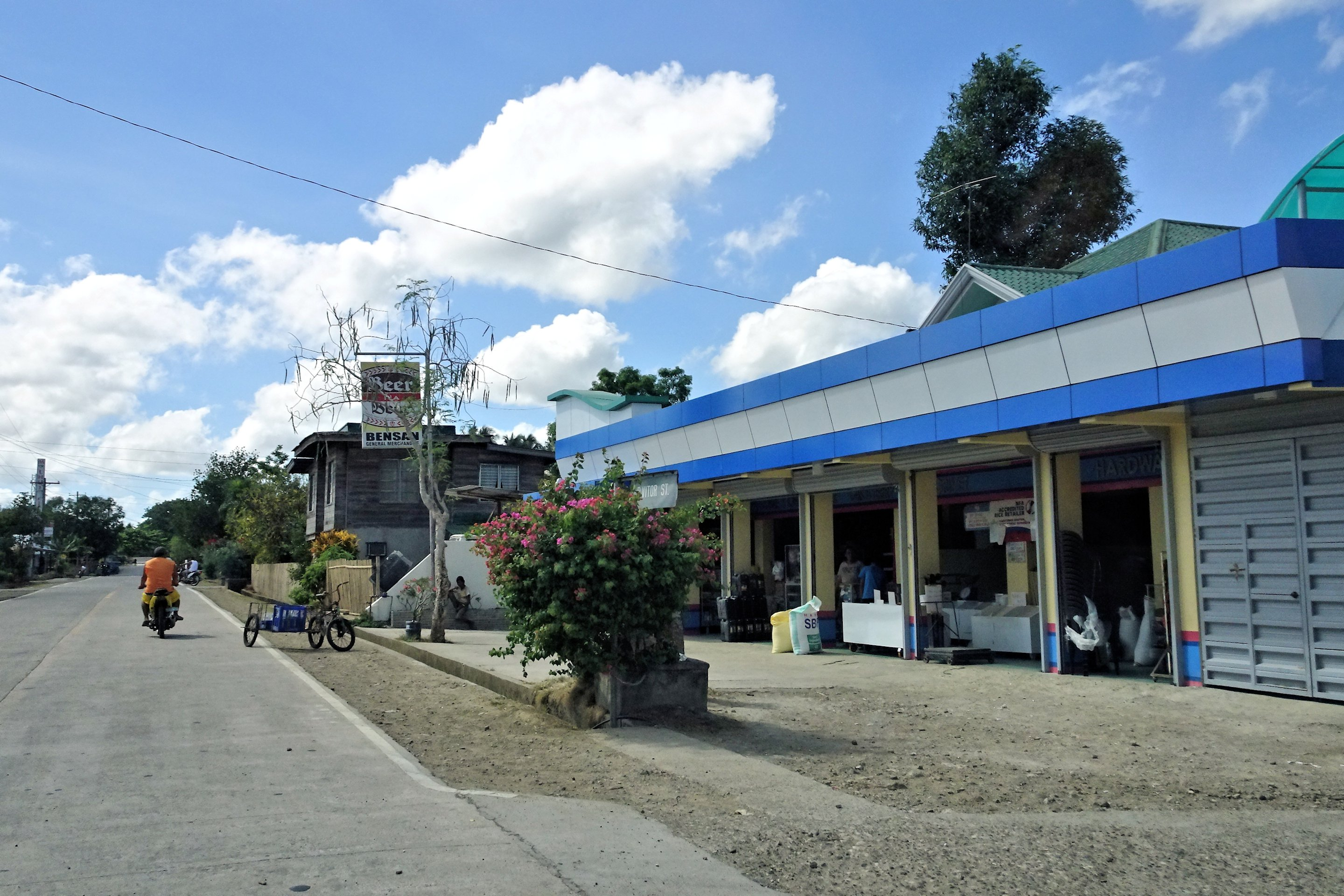
- Danao, Bohol

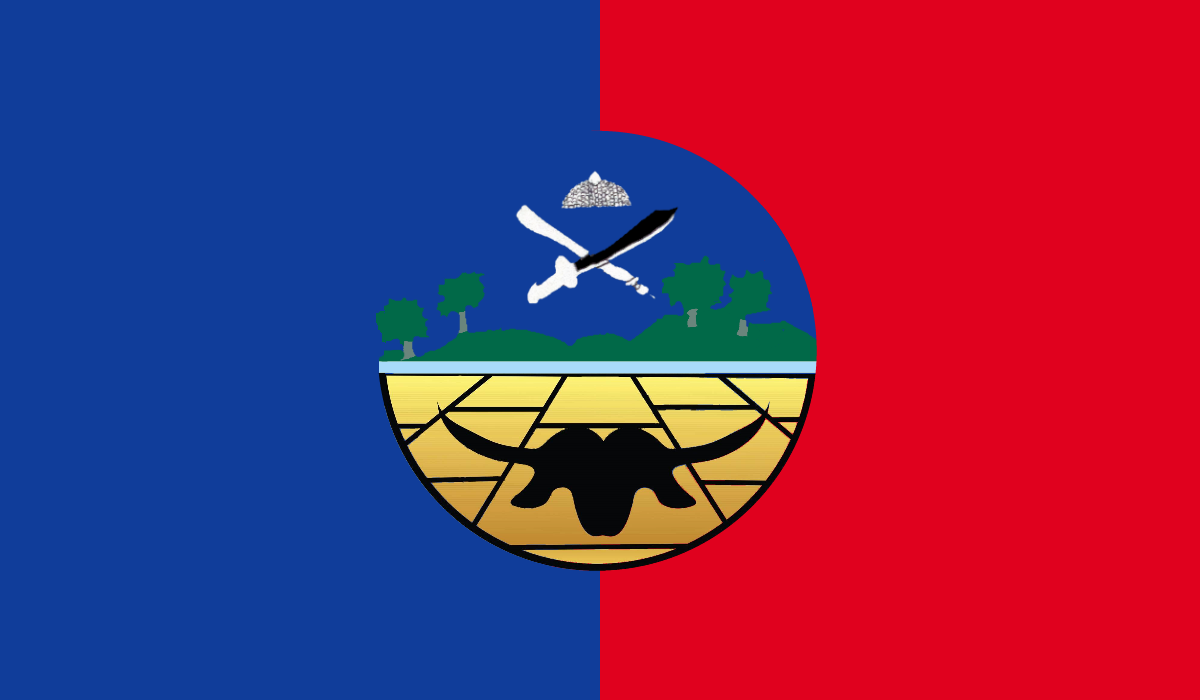
- Flag

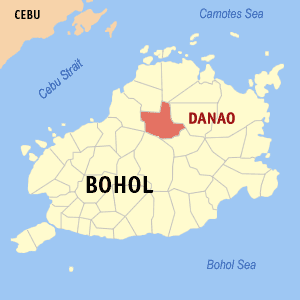
- Map of Bohol with Danao highlighted
- Interactive map of Danao
- Location within the Philippines
- Coordinates: 10°01′N 124°16′E
- Country: Philippines
- Region: Central Visayas
- Province: Bohol
- District: 2nd district
- Founded: 16 March 1961
- Barangays: 17 (see Barangays)

Government
  - Type: Sangguniang Bayan
  - Mayor: Maria Celeste Cepedoza-Lerion
  - Vice Mayor: Jose Gonzaga Cepedoza
  - Representative: Ma. Vanessa Cadorna-Aumentado
  - Municipal Council: Members: Kairus Orapa Suter; Alberto Melencion Torregoza; Benjamin Socorin Bonio; Paul Vincent Orapa Cepedoza; Albert Bautista Vitor; Evelyn Villamor Lim; Crisanto Orapa Trazo; Aurelio Supas Torregoza; NB COMELEC
  - Electorate: 14,409 voters (2025)

Area
  - Total: 162.76 km^{2} (62.84 sq mi)
- Elevation: 143 m (469 ft)
- Highest elevation: 424 m (1,391 ft)
- Lowest elevation: 57 m (187 ft)

Population (2024 census)
  - Total: 20,299
  - Density: 124.72/km^{2} (323.02/sq mi)
  - Households: 4,446

Economy
  - Income class: 3rd municipal income class
  - Poverty incidence: 26.53% (2023)
  - Revenue: ₱ 187.6 million (2024)
  - Assets: ₱ 526.3 million (2024)
  - Expenditure: ₱ 102.7 million (2024)
  - Liabilities: ₱ 171.9 million (2024)

Service provider
  - Electricity: Bohol 2 Electric Cooperative (BOHECO 2)
- Time zone: UTC+8 (PST)
- ZIP code: 6344
- PSGC: 071218000
- IDD : area code: +63 (0)38
- Native languages: Boholano dialect Cebuano; Tagalog

Danao, officially the Municipality of Danao (Cebuano: Munisipalidad sa Danao; Tagalog: Bayan ng Danao), is a municipality in the province of Bohol, Philippines. According to the 2024 census, it has a population of 20,299 people.

Danao celebrates its fiesta on December 30, to honor the town patron the Holy Family.

== Etymology ==
According to the Diccionario Español-Bisaya (1866), danao means charca, lago, laguna, pantano, estanque grande, avenida, campañas, etc. (lake, lagoon, freshet, large reservoir, arable land, field, etc.). Except that of a lake, all definitions of danao describe the municipality of Danao, with freshet being the most likely meaning. A freshet is either a sudden rise or overflow of a stream or river, or freshwater stream emptying into the sea.

== History ==
In the beginning, Danao is part of Inabanga, when the latter became a town in 1724. In 1744, Francisco Dagohoy (Sendrijas) established the First Bohol Republic at Caylagan Cave (now Francisco Dagohoy Cave) in barangay Magtangtang, located northwest of the present-day Poblacion. Magtangtang became the seat of government and headquarters of the independent Bohol that lasted for more than 85 years.

In 1830, Talibon became an independent pueblo from Inabanga, and Danao was annexed to it. During the first US sponsored Census, Danao is listed as one of the barrios of Talibon with a recorded population of 585 in 1903.

In 1953, the town of Victoria (now Dagohoy, Bohol) was established and 5 barangays namely Cantubod, Danao, Hibale, Santa Fe, and Santo Niño were carved out from Talibon through Executive Order No. 634 by President Elpidio Quirino to form a new municipality together with other 13 barangays in Carmen, Sierra Bullones, Trinidad, and Ubay. However, after only less than 3 years of existence, Victoria was reorganized and became the new municipality of Dagohoy. The 5 barangays were reverted to Talibon through Executive Order No. 184 by President Ramon Magsaysay and upon the recommendation of the Provincial Board of Bohol.

Finally, on March 14, 1961, Danao became an independent municipality through Executive Order No. 422 by President Carlos P. Garcia. Sixteen (16) barangays from municipalities of Talibon, Inabanga, and Carmen with the seat of government at barangay Danao were organized into a new town. The list of barangays are shown below:

Original Names of Barangays of Danao, Bohol
From Talibon		From Inabanga	From Carmen
Cantubod	Remedios	Bongbong (Carbon)	Anunciado (Villa Anunciado)
Concepcion	San Carlos	Cabatoan (Cabatuan)	Anunciado (Villa Anunciado)
Dagohoy	San Miguel	Nahud	Anunciado (Villa Anunciado)
Danao (Poblacion)	Santa Fe	San Roque (Magtangtang and Tabok)	Anunciado (Villa Anunciado)
Hibale	Santo Niño	Taming	Anunciado (Villa Anunciado)

== Geography ==
The Isumod river flowing near the town center of Danao may suddenly overflow and inundate a large portion of the town. The river joins the Wahig river and empties into the sea. Danao is 123 kilometers (76 mi) from Tagbilaran.

=== Barangays ===
Danao is politically subdivided into 17 barangays. Each barangay consists of puroks and some have sitios.

PSGC	Barangay	Population			±% p.a.	
		2024		2010		
071218001	Cabatuan	7.0%	1,428	1,353	▴	0.38%
071218002	Cantubod	5.2%	1,047	1,061	▾	−0.09%
071218003	Carbon	1.9%	384	513	▾	−1.99%
071218004	Concepcion	8.0%	1,623	1,566	▴	0.25%
071218005	Dagohoy	3.2%	659	685	▾	−0.27%
071218006	Hibale	4.2%	843	856	▾	−0.11%
071218007	Magtangtang	6.2%	1,256	1,422	▾	−0.86%
071218008	Nahud	4.8%	966	855	▴	0.85%
071218009	Poblacion	16.9%	3,434	3,296	▴	0.29%
071218010	Remedios	6.3%	1,288	1,220	▴	0.38%
071218011	San Carlos	5.8%	1,170	1,236	▾	−0.38%
071218012	San Miguel	2.8%	559	499	▴	0.79%
071218013	Santa Fe	2.8%	567	526	▴	0.52%
071218014	Santo Niño	3.5%	719	748	▾	−0.27%
071218015	Tabok	4.7%	946	1,060	▾	−0.79%
071218016	Taming	4.6%	932	863	▴	0.54%
071218017	Villa Anunciado	0.6%	112	150	▾	−2.01%
	Total		20,299	17,952	▴	0.86%

=== Climate ===
Climate data for Dagohoy, Bohol
Month	Jan	Feb	Mar	Apr	May	Jun	Jul	Aug	Sep	Oct	Nov	Dec	Year
Mean daily maximum °C (°F)	27 (81)	28 (82)	29 (84)	30 (86)	31 (88)	30 (86)	29 (84)	30 (86)	30 (86)	29 (84)	28 (82)	28 (82)	29 (84)
Mean daily minimum °C (°F)	23 (73)	22 (72)	22 (72)	23 (73)	24 (75)	24 (75)	24 (75)	23 (73)	23 (73)	23 (73)	23 (73)	23 (73)	23 (73)
Average precipitation mm (inches)	98 (3.9)	82 (3.2)	96 (3.8)	71 (2.8)	104 (4.1)	129 (5.1)	101 (4.0)	94 (3.7)	99 (3.9)	135 (5.3)	174 (6.9)	143 (5.6)	1,326 (52.3)
Average rainy days	18.0	14.1	17.1	16.8	23.7	25.7	25.8	23.3	24.2	25.9	24.0	20.6	259.2
Source: Meteoblue (modeled/calculated data, not measured locally)

== Demographics ==
Population census of Danao
Year	Pop.	±% p.a.
1970	7,362	—
1975	8,447	+2.80%
1980	10,298	+4.04%
1990	12,671	+2.10%
1995	14,042	+1.94%
2000	17,265	+4.53%
2007	17,716	+0.36%
2010	17,952	+0.48%
2015	17,890	−0.07%
2020	20,245	+2.64%
2024	20,299	+0.06%
Source: Philippine Statistics Authority

== Economy ==
Poverty incidence of Danao (%)

Source: Philippine Statistics Authority

== Tourism ==
- Bohol Sea of Clouds: A picturesque ocean-like view of clouds on top of Laguna Hills at barangay Concepcion which about 5 kilometers from the town proper. This majestic occurrence is much observable from 4 to 6 o'clock in the morning which happens throughout the year whenever the weather is fine. It requires visitors to have a 10-minute walk to reach the top of the hill.
- Dagohoy Historical Marker: A historical marker on Dagohoy's grave in the mountains installed in his honor. The Dagohoy Marker located in barangay Magtangtang, was installed by the Philippine Historical Commission to honor the heroic deeds of Dagohoy. Magtangtang was Francisco Dagohoy's headquarters or hideout during the revolt. Hundreds of Dagohoy's followers preferred death inside the cave than surrender. Their skeletons still remain in the site.
- Eco, Extreme, and Educational Adventure Tour (EAT) Danao offers a great new experience of Bohol. One can soar across one of Bohol's most attractive gorges like a bird; raft or canoe on a river; explore caves; practice mountain climbing, both on a wall, and on real cliffs; and explore some of the wildest spots of the island. This 144-hectare property is located in Magtangtang which is about 10 kilometers from the town proper, and managed by the local government unit.
- Francisco Dagohoy Cave: Formerly known as Caylagan cave, the site served as the headquarter of the independent Bohol Republic established by the great Boholano hero, Francisco Dagohoy in 1744. Dagohoy rebellion is the longest revolt in the Philippines which lasted 85 years from 1744 to 1829. The cave is said to be the passageway to other few more caves in the province. However, such passageways were merely inaccessible due to previous earthquakes that badly hit the area.
- Kamira Cave: Similar to Caylagan cave, the site is located in barangay Magtangtang. It is a 477-meter long cave and will take 45 minutes to explore. Characterized by the presence of narrow passages; stalactites and stalagmites; bats, and freshwater crabs, the place is a marvel and allow visitors to experience wonders of nature. The icy cold water that flows through the cave also provides a chilly feeling.

== Education ==
Elementary and primary schools
  - Cabatuan Elementary School
  - Cantubod Elementary School
  - Carbon Primary School
  - Concepcion Elementary School
  - Dagohoy Elementary School
  - Danao Central Elementary School
  - Hibale Elementary School
  - Magtangtang Elementary School
  - Nahud Elementary School
  - Remedios Primary School
  - San Carlos Elementary School
  - San Miguel Primary School
  - Santa Fe Primary School
  - Santo Niño Primary School
  - Tabok Elementary School
  - Taming Elementary School
  - Villa Anunciado Primary School
Secondary schools
  - Cantubod National High School
  - Danao National High School
  - Francisco Dagohoy Memorial High School
  - Taming National High School

== Galleries ==
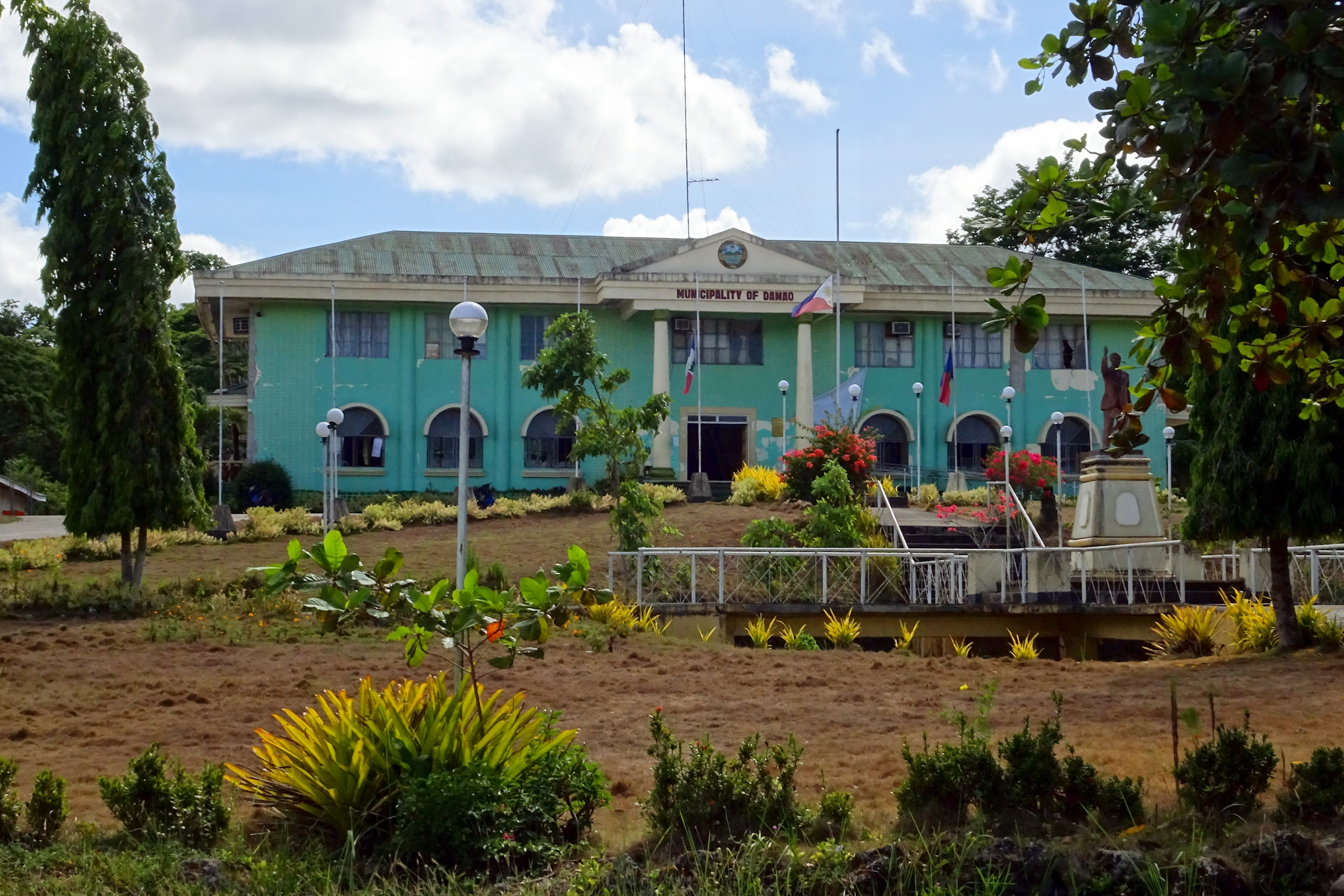
Municipal hall

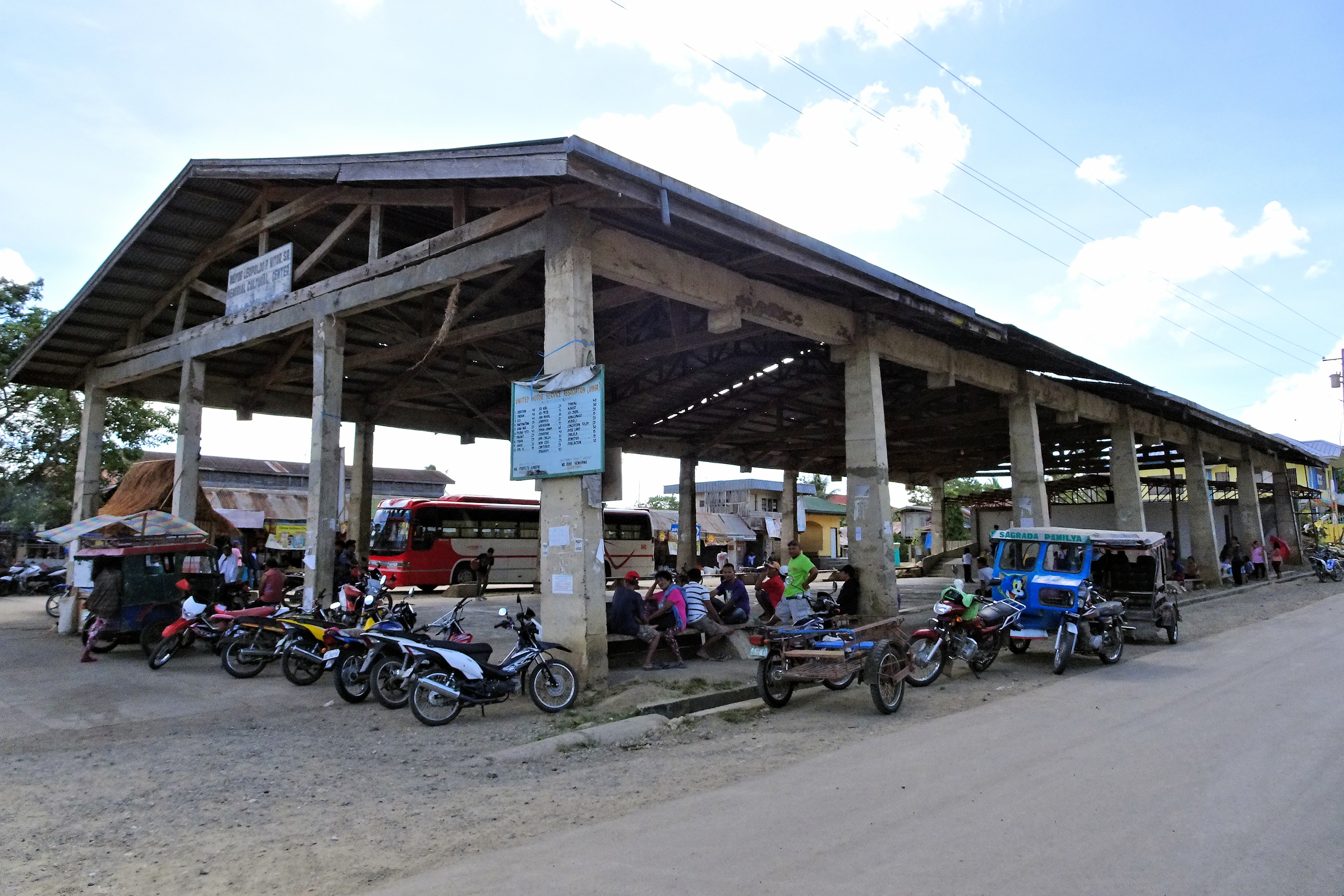
Bus terminal

== Danao Hymn ==
A hymn was composed in the early 2000s to honor the municipality of Danao. It is sung last in the tricolored hymn. These are the lyrics in Visayan dialect:

Gihalaran ka ug gi-amoma

Lungsod nga hinigugma

Katahom mo ug kamadanihon

Kinaiyahan nga madasigon

Ang maanindot mong mga kasapaan

Kabungturan ug mga kaumahan

Tubig sa suba nga matin-aw

Nagtimaan sa kahusay ug kalinaw

Ang mga langob ug ang kawasan

Walay sama ang iyang katahuman

Mga bahandi sa kalikopan

Sa katawhan padayon nga giampingan

O lungsod nga mauswagon

Ikaw ang dalan sa mga kalamposan

Tingusbawan, damgo'g kadaugan

Kanimo lamang ihalad ang tanan

Niining dughan, mutya kang masilaw

Yutang natawhan...

Pinangga kong Danao...

== Sources ==
- de la Encarnacion, Juan Félis (1866). Diccionario Español-Bisaya (in Spanish) (segunda ed.). Binondo.
- "E.A.T. Danao". EatDanao.com. 21 October 2006. Archived from the original on 2 April 2015.
