= Tamblot =

Boholano medium and revolter

Personal life
- Flourished: 1621–1622
- Known for: Igniting native resistance against Spanish occupation in Bohol
- Occupation: Priest (babaylan)

Religious life
- Religion: Indigenous Boholano belief systems

Tamblot (fl. 1621–1622) was the name given to a babaylan (a Visayan term for mediums and religious leaders in the Philippines' pre-colonial and early colonial periods) who incited a series of uprisings against Spanish colonial rule in the island of Bohol. Indigenous religions and beliefs played a huge part behind the revolts' inception as Roman Catholicism spread throughout the Philippine archipelago, a process which many of its inhabitants rejected in favor of their local customs. A few uprisings in the early colonial era such as this one were thus motivated in part by resistance against the presence of Christianity.

Tamblot successfully convinced parts of the Boholano population to revolt against the Spanish Empire, who held full dominion over the island, by informing the residents about a diwata—a localized term for a deity or god—who pledged to aid them in expelling Spain out of Bohol. Persuaded, people in most of the island's villages began to revolt and wreak havoc, gaining the attention of the nearby province of Cebu and its alcalde-mayor by the name of Don Juan Alcarazo. Some colonial sources explain that the diwata also promised to grant the Boholanos a joyous future in exchange for their servitude to and construction of a shrine dedicated to the deity in question, apart from their departure from Spain's religion and authority.

Alcarazo subsequently assembled his troops consisting of Spanish and Philippine soldiers then traveled to Bohol, leading the others through the thick, mountainous forests inland in pursuit of the rebels. The enemy forces eventually met, and a downpour of rain befell the battle scene. Tamblot and the other Boholanos interpreted the rainfall as the act of their diwata, who they believed was sabotaging Alcarazo's troops and their weapons. However, his soldiers managed to push them back and cause them to retreat. Afterwards, the alcalde-mayor eventually quashed the revolt, killing and capturing many of its insurgents. Despite the victory, Alcarazo would have to put down more acts of civil unrest in the Pintados Islands (Note: A former name for islands in the Visayas. These include Cebu, Bohol, Leyte, and Samar, among others.) before peace in the region could be restored.

== Biography ==
Little is known about Tamblot's personal life other than their position as a babaylan to a regional deity in Bohol. The term babaylan was most often used in the Visayan Islands and described a tradition, common throughout the Philippines, of religious practitioners who led ritual sacrifices and ceremonies, acted as mediums between humans and the supernatural world, and served as folk healers who diagnosed illnesses through séances. In Visayan communities, babaylan could be either "male or female," with a majority of them being women, although few were also "male transvestites" called asog who assumed female or feminine roles and were often described as "more like a woman than a man."

== The revolt ==
According to Spanish accounts of Fr. Juan Medina (History of the Augustinian Order in the Filipinas Islands, 1630) Tamblot gained followers when he and his priests showed 'miracles' around the surrounding villages. He would pierce bamboos poles with a small knife from which rice and wine would flow out of magically. Another account by Fr. Murillo Velarde (Historia de Phelipinas, 1749) stated that Tamblot promised his disciples that weapons would bounce off their skin, bejuco vines would provide distilled wine, tree leaves would turn into saranga (fish) for food and banana leaves into linen for clothing. He promised them that once a shrine was created in the seclusion of the hills, that he and his followers would be able to lead a life full of bounty thanks to the miracles the diwata would provide. They would also be free from tax and church duties required of them by the Spanish authorities.

Map of Cebu and Bohol, with relevant settlements marked. (Note: Some place names labeled here have been changed—Inabangan is now named Inabanga, Malabago is now Cortes, and Malabohoc is now Maribojoc.) At the time, the province of Bohol was under the jurisdiction of Cebu, with the seat of power located in Cebu City (Santisimo Nombre de Jesus).

He quickly gained followers many in turn went to other villages performing the same miracles and preaching his message as his priests. He preached that with his magic, the native gods ie diwatas would protect them from the Spanish weapons and they would be able to vanquish them from the island. He instructed his followers to gather much goods and rice in order to set up a bastion in the foothills expecting an impending attack. Four villages around the towns of Loboc and Baclayon defected to his movement. All in all, Tamblot supposedly built a shrine for the diwata surrounded by hundreds of huts of his followers deep in the mountains. His message spread far and wide around the Visayas region including Pintado and Leyte that roused the alarm of local priests in the city of Santísimo Nombre de Jesús (now Cebu City). The priests encouraged the alcalde-mayor of Cebu, Juan Alcarazo, to take action against the Boholanos in order to stifle the spread of their movement. Alcarazo hesitated to act as he did not have permission from his superior the governor-general, Alonzo Fajardo. In three accounts, Alcarazo supposedly had sent messages to the rebels for them to lay down their arms which the Boholanos flatly refused.

The priests were finally able to persuade him to act early to stamp out a full scale revolt that might spread throughout other islands. He assembled a small contingent of 50 Spanish and 1000 native troops, mostly Sialo warriors armed with swords and shields as well as Spanish firearms. An account by Aduarte added that the contingent consisted of Cebuanos as well as Kapampangan warriors with a Spanish priest, the total force numbering more than a 1000. Upon landing in Bohol using four caracoas, they started marching on New Year's Day of 1622 seeking out the mountain stronghold of Tamblot's followers. The journey took five days through steep terrain and swamps but finally reached their base.

On the sixth day, conflict started with the rebels killing a native ally in a skirmish. The next day after that, an estimated 1500 strong force ambushed the Spanish vanguard defended by a 16 Spanish troops and 300 native allies. Spanish and Cebuano soldiers fired volleys of musket shot on the Boholanos killing many. Tamblot's men was forced to retreat to a bamboo thicket. The Spanish troops pursued them but were bogged down by a sudden heavy rainfall. As heavy rain started to pour it briefly slowed down their rate of their fire giving a momentary time lapse for Tamblot's men to counter. Tamblot and his priests encouraged their followers to attack head on stating that the rain was a miracle from the diwatas. Fortunately for the Spanish forces, the shields of the Cebuanos were able to keep the guns dry enough from the rain continuing massive damage against the Boholano counterattack. The continued volley of fire mowed down charging Boholano zealots enough to rout them. Most were sent fleeing further into the mountains.

The Spanish troops then seized upon the stronghold, with a manned stone redoubt from where the natives hurled stones and clods of earth/mud. During the battle, Alcarazo was supposedly hit and knocked out momentarily with a rock thrown by the enemy. He recovered thanks to the protection of his helmet and quickly rallied his troops. The troops raised their shields as they were pelted by stones, and eventually were able to gain access to the redoubt. Slaughter of the defenders ensued. The base was pillaged; booty of food, gold, silver and bells were collected. For four more days the Spanish troops pursued the many who fled, either killing them or finding them dead of hunger.

The Spanish colonial troops dispersed or killed the remaining of Tamblot's followers. Some of the leaders were hanged and the rest were given amnesty. Some of those they captured were sentenced to enslavement of 10 years. The troops returned to Loboc. Alcarazo left a contingent of native troops and within weeks arrived back at Cebu victorious. Six months later, another group of rebels reformed and set another base on the peak of another mountain. Alcarazo again returned to Bohol with more troops. After a vicious uphill campaign, wherein the attacking force was harassed by defenders as they slowly raced up the steep mountain stronghold incurring much losses, the Spanish forces were able to reach top. After a fierce battle, the defenders were overpowered again by musket fire. The natives were either routed and fled, or killed, putting a stop to the revolt.

Alcarazo was given commendation. Part of the war booty he collected was awarded to him by the governor for his swift actions in Bohol.

== Impact ==
The flag of Bohol features a device that is charged in the center and flanked on both sides by two bolos, one of which representing the Tamblot uprisings

Tamblot's insurrections directly influenced another island northeast of Bohol, Leyte, to begin a revolt against Spanish vassalage as well. A local datu named Bankaw—who welcomed the arrival of Miguel Lopez de Legazpi in the Philippines as ruler of the Limasawa polity and was baptized as a Christian during their encounter—decided to renounce the Christian faith shortly after the events in Bohol. Now in his old age, Bankaw was assisted by another babaylan Pagali in sparking sedition among Leyte's population "until [it] was plunged into a chaos of armed resistance," wishing to return to the island of Leyte's indigenous beliefs. Like the Tamblot uprisings, this revolt also involved the construction of a shrine to a local deity and was also put down by the same Don Juan Alcarazo, the alcalde-mayor of Cebu.

The Tamblot uprising was one of two significant revolts that occurred in Bohol during the Spanish Era. The other one was the Dagohoy Rebellion, considered as the longest rebellion in Philippine history. This rebellion was led by Francisco Dagohoy, also known as Francisco Sendrijas, from 1744 to 1829.

Tamblot is immortalized in the flag of the Province of Bohol. The center of the aforementioned flag is charged with the main element of Bohol's provincial seal, with two bolo knives or swords flanking the symbol. These bolos represent the two notable resistance movements against the Spanish Empire that occurred in Bohol. One of the bolos in question symbolizes the revolts that Tamblot helped stir up.

== Bibliography ==
=== References ===
- Agoncillo, Teodoro (1990). History of the Filipino People (8th ed.). Quezon City: R.P. Garcia Publishing Company. p. 104. ISBN 971-1024-15-2.
- Blair, Emma; Robertson, James Alexander, eds. (1906a). The Philippine Islands, 1493-1898. Vol. 24. Cleveland: Arthur H. Clark Company. pp. 116–119.
- Blair, Emma; Robertson, James Alexander, eds. (1906b). The Philippine Islands, 1493-1898. Vol. 38. Cleveland: Arthur H. Clark Company. pp. 87–94, 241.
- Brewer, Carolyn (1999). "Baylan, Asog, Transvestism, and Sodomy: Gender, Sexuality and the Sacred in Early Colonial Philippines". Intersections: Gender, History and Culture in the Asian Context (2). Archived from the original on 12 February 2020.
- Scott, William Henry (1994). Barangay: Sixteenth-Century Philippine Culture and Society. Quezon City: Ateneo University Press. pp. 77, 84. ISBN 978-971-550-135-4.
- "The Bohol Flag and Seal". The Provincial Government of Bohol. n.d. Archived from the original on 8 December 2009.
- Zafra, Nicolas (1956). Readings in Philippine History (New ed.). Quezon City: University of the Philippines. pp. 241–242.
- Zaide, Gregorio (1949). Philippine Political and Cultural History: The Philippines Since Pre-Spanish Times. Vol. 1. Manila: R.P. Garcia Publishing Company. pp. 348–349.
