= Dagohoy rebellion =

1829 rebellion on Bohol, Philippines

- Part of the Philippine revolts against Spain
- A map of Bohol, Philippines
Date	January 24, 1744 – August 31, 1829
Location	Bohol, Captaincy General of the Philippines
Result	Spanish victory

Belligerents
Spain	Boholano people

Commanders and leaders
Gasper de la Torre (starting in 1744); Mariano Ricafort Palacin (ending in 1829); Jose Lazaro Cairo; Manuel Sanz; Celedonio Villahermosa; Ignacio Manuel Cabrera	Francisco Dagohoy; Ignacio Arañez; Pedro Baguio; Bernardo Sanote; Mandog; Maximino Dagohoy (Sendrijas)

Strength
2,200 soldiers	3,000–20,000 followers (in 1744)

Casualties and losses
546 killed (mainly ambushed)	19,420 surrendered 395 died in battle 98 exiled

The Dagohoy rebellion, also known as the Dagohoy revolution and the Dagohoy revolt, is considered as the longest rebellion in Philippine history. Led by Francisco Dagohoy, or Francisco Sendrijas, the rebellion took place on the island of Bohol from 1744 to 1829, lasting for roughly 85 years.

It was one of two significant revolts that occurred in Bohol during the Spanish era. The other one was the Tamblot uprising in 1621 led by Tamblot, a babaylan or native priest from Bohol which was basically a religious conflict.

== Rebellion ==
The Dagohoy rebellion was one of two significant revolts that occurred in Bohol during the Spanish era. The other was the Tamblot uprising in 1621 led by Tamblot, a babaylan or native priest from Bohol which was basically a religious conflict.

Unlike the Tamblot revolt, the Dagohoy rebellion was not a religious conflict. Rather, it was like most of the early revolts which were ignited by forced labor (polo y servicios), bandala, excessive tax collection and payment of tributes. On top of these injustices of the Jesuit priests, what triggered Dagohoy most was the refusal of the Jesuit priest to give a Christian burial to his brother who died in a duel. This caused Dagohoy to call upon his fellow Boholanos to raise arms against the colonial government. The rebellion outlasted several Spanish governors-general and several missions.

In 1744, Gaspar Morales, the Jesuit curate of Inabanga, ordered Francisco's brother, Sagarino, who was a constable, to capture an apostate fugitive. Sagarino pursued the fugitive, but the latter resisted and killed him. Morales refused to give Sagarino a Christian burial because he had died in a duel, a practice banned by the Church. (Note: Constantino claimed that Dagohoy's brother Sagarino was a renegade who had abandoned the Christian religion and that Father Morales ordered a native constable to arrest Sagarino. Sagarino resisted arrest and killed the constable before he himself died.)

Infuriated, Francisco instigated the people to rise in arms. The signal of the uprising was the killing of Giuseppe Lamberti, Italian Jesuit curate of Jagna, on January 24, 1744. The rebellion rolled over the whole island like a typhoon; Morales was killed by Dagohoy afterward. Bishop of Cebu, Miguel Lino de Espeleta, who exercised ecclesiastical authority over Bohol, tried in vain to mollify the rebellious Boholanos.

=== Bohol revolutionary government ===
Dagohoy defeated the Spanish forces sent against him. He established an independent government in the mountains of Bohol on December 20, 1745, and had 3,000 followers, which subsequently increased to 20,000. His followers remained unsubdued in their mountains stronghold and, even after Dagohoy's death, continued to defy Spanish power.

One reason for his success is his reliance on collective farming practices. After the death of Spanish landlords, the farmers wanted to begin farming again. Many farmers wanted to institute land reform but the Revolutionary Cabinet decided that they should work in umahang communal or communal farms. Farmers would be the owners of the farms they would work in and have a say in its affairs. More than 15 dozen farms were collectivized in Bohol. This helped the revolution to have the least amount of food shortages no matter the turbulent weather and made the Bohol of today an agricultural powerhouse.

A cave in Danao was the headquarters of Dagohoy. Many passages within Dagohoy's cave led underwater to dry land, and it is said that every time Spaniards searched the cave, Dagohoy could swim underwater through this passage to hide in the breathing space.

== The End of the Rebellion ==
Twenty Spanish governors-general, from Gasper de la Torre (1739–1745) to Juan Antonio Martínez (1822–1825), tried to quell the rebellion and failed. In 1825, Mariano Ricafort Palacin (1825–1830) became governor-general of the Philippines. Upon his order, alcalde-mayor Jose Lazaro Cairo, at the head of 2,200 Filipino-Spanish troops and several batteries, invaded Bohol on May 7, 1827. The Boholanos resisted fiercely. Cairo won several engagements but failed to crush the rebellion. Dagohoy's death eventually caused the rebellion to fizzle out. No major repercussions followed and most of the rebels were pardoned.

== Results ==
=== Catagdaan Cave Incident (1826) ===
Nicolas Enrile, the civil governor of Cebu, exposed and criticized the abuses of the military during their expedition to pacify the rebellion in Bohol, as testified by the Augustinian Recollect friars who were Padre Miguel de Jesus of Panglao and Padre Julian Bermejo of Boljoon who witnessed the atrocities.

In the year 1826, the most harrowing event was at the Catagdaan Cave (currently in Pilar, Bohol). The expedition was led by Ignacio Manuel Cabrera and an adjutant named Mariano Fernandez who was able to corner the remnant of the rebels in the mountains. These people–predominantly women and children–seek refuge inside the deep cavern of Catagdaan, led by Mandog, along with all their precious belongings. Instead of negotiating a surrender, the military commander ordered an execution by suffocation, and for three days the soldiers piled massive amounts of combustible at the cave's primary mouth and set them ablaze, pumping thick, toxic smoke into the cavern. The natives knew of a hidden exit and it was incredibly narrow at the far end of the cave and they rushed toward it to escape being suffocated, yet a desperate warrior named Tupas attempted to squeeze through the tight crevice; however he was stuck firmly in the opening, and the crowd behind could not dislodge him.

After the fifth day since they suffocated the cave, they enter and plunder the site, they found 500 to 600 corpses of men, women, and children piled on top of one another who died from asphyxiation, with Tupas still stuck in the narrow passage. They stripped the dead of their precious belongings like gold, silver jewelry, fine clothing, six bantines (gong), and they also confiscated five small artillery pieces and the ammunition these natives possessed. Mandog and a few survivors who had managed to evade such gruesome event used the story to rally remaining factions, igniting a wave of furious retaliatory attacks that burned the churches and rectories of Catigbian and Dimiao, and they would have burn Balilihan, but spared due to the reinforcement from the neighboring towns of Baclayon, Tagbilaran, and Dauis.

=== Mass Executions in the Mountains of Inabanga ===
The Government in Manila deployed veteran troops under Captain Manuel Sanz to hunt down the remaining guerrilla defense. Enrile reported a staggering act of war crimes committed by Provincial Captain Celedonio Villahermosa, a native colonial officer from Dalaguete, Cebu. He captured several mountain dwellers who had voluntarily laid down their weapons and surrendered to them. However, Villahermosa decided to execute these people—under the orders of Commander Sanz—in a pretext that he lacked the food rations necessary to feed them. One by one, hundreds of these surrendered prisoners were beheaded in the mountains of Inabanga.

=== Forced Marches and Deportations (1831) ===
Due to fear of another uprising, Captain Manuel Sanz demanded that the chiefs of neighboring provinces hunt down any Boholano emigrants or refugees who had fled the island and forcibly return them to Bohol. While traveling back through the coastal towns of Cebu, Enrile personally witnessed in his own eyes a deeply distressing scene, he encountered captured Boholanos tied together like a livestocked, being marched under military guard.

Even during a march, Enrile himself saw a captive pregnant women who went into labor. The military guards refused to untie the line or delay the transport; they merely forced the column to halt in the middle of the dirt road just long enough for the woman to give birth in the dust. The moment the labor was over, without a time to rest or even clean herself or her newborn, the guards forced her to stand. She was made to strap her crying, vulnerable infant to her back using tattered rags and immediately resume the marching under the scorching sun to keep pace with the rest of the bound captives.

=== Demographic and Economic Collapse ===
The alcalde-mayor of Cebu, Nicolas Enrile, provided a data demonstrating a staggering loss of life and mass exodus from the islands over a span of about 15 to 20 years. In 1830, Captain Sanz reported that 21,454 souls had been cathecized and five new towns were formed, however, by the year 1847, the number of registered taxpayers plummeted to 2,490, which—even multiplied by 5 individuals per taxpayers—yields only 12,452 souls at present.

Enrile also stated that the military occupation of Bohol wrecked the economy of the island, that it even cannot sustain itself. Before 1826, the coastal towns traded their products for the mountain dwellers unhusked rice, corn, cacao, and wax; and this trade is what kept the coastal towns under reduccion prosperous. The campaigns completely eradicated this trade network by exterminating and displacing the locals in the mountains.

According to Enrile, tax and operational cost extracted by the military was way far beyond what the island of Bohol could produce by one-fifth (20%), making economic the island impoverished.

Economic Metric	Estimated Value
Total Value of Exports (mostly cattle to Cebu)	$32,000
Total Taxes and Military Burdens	$40,000
Net Deficit	-$8,000

The cost of military conquest and maintenance of the naval stations for 20 years cost approximately $150,000, and the heaviest burden fell on the local communities who were forced to cover $100,000 of these expenses from their communal funds—these money that should have been used on public works and infrastructure.

Expenditure Category	Amount
Initial Resettlement Cash	$11,000
Veteran Troop Pay & Allowance	$30,000 (minimum)
Resettlement Subsidies	$9,000
Compulsory Town Contributions	$100,000
Total	$150,000

=== Severe Labor Drain and Food Insecurity ===
Many of the most capable workforce of the island was conscripted by the Spanish military command. One of the example was the town of Baclayon being forced to surrender 5 barangayanen (ships), 120 men, and 120 sacks of rice just to supply a naval station. By pulling the youth away from agriculture, the island could no longer feed itself, and forcing them to import large quantities of corn from Negros and southern Cebu for six months out of the year.

== Legacy ==
Flag of Bohol

The Dagohoy rebellion features in the Bohol provincial flag as one of the two Sundang or native swords with handle and hand-guards on top. These two sundang, which are reclining respectively towards the left and right, depict the Dagohoy and Tamblot revolts, symbolizing that "a true Boholano will rise and fight if supervening factors embroil them into something beyond reason or tolerance."

The town of Dagohoy, Bohol is named in his honor. It was Vice President Carlos P. Garcia who proposed the name "Dagohoy" in honor of Francisco Sendrijas alias Dagohoy. The name Dagohoy is a concatenation of the Visayan phrase Dagon sa huyuhoy or "talisman of the breeze" in English.

The Dagohoy Memorial National High School in Dagohoy, Bohol is also named in his honor and memory.

== Related Literature ==
- Agoncillo, Teodoro A. History of the Filipino People. GAROTECH Publishing, 1990 (8th Edition).
- Arcila, Jose S. Rizal and the Emergence of the Philippine Nation. 2001 revised edition.
- Constantino, Renato. The Philippines: A Past Revisited. Tala Publishing Series, 1975.
- Corpuz, Onofre D. The Roots of the Filipino Nation. 1989.
- Scott, William Henry. Barangay: Sixteenth-Century Philippine Culture and Society. AdMU: 1994.
- Zaide, Gregorio F. Great Filipinos in History: An Epic of Filipino Greatness in War and Peace. Verde Bookstore, 1970.
- Zaide, Gregorio. Dagohoy: Champion of Philippine Freedom. Manila: Enriquez, Alduan and Co., 1941.
