= Francisco Dagohoy =

Filipino freedom fighter

- Born: Francisco Sendrijas c. 1724; Inabanga, Bohol, Captaincy General of the Philippines, Spanish Empire
- Died: c. 1800 (aged 75–76); Talibon, Bohol, Captaincy General of the Philippines, Spanish Empire
- Organization: Boholano insurgents

Francisco Dagohoy (born Francisco Sendrijas; c. 1724) was a Filipino revolutionary who holds the distinction of having initiated the longest revolt in Philippine history, the Dagohoy rebellion. This rebellion against the Spanish colonial government took place on the island of Bohol from 1744 to 1829, roughly 85 years.

Dagohoy, was born in 1724, and that he was a native of Barangay Cambitoon, Inabanga, Bohol. He was also cabeza de barangay, or one of the barangay captains of the town.

His name derives from an amulet ("dagon" in Cebuano) he wore, which people believed gave him the charm of a gentle wind or "hoyohoy" (or huyuhoy) and the power to jump or fly-over from hill to hill or across rivers like a gentle flowing wind. He was believed to have clear vision inside dark caves and be invisible whenever and wherever he wanted. The name Dagohoy is a concatenation of the Visayan phrase dagon sa huyuhoy or "talisman of the breeze" in English. His brother is named Sagarino Dagohoy. Sagarino was refused a proper burial by a Jesuit priest, who was then killed by Francisco.

== Fight against Spain ==
The Dagohoy rebellion was one of two significant revolts that occurred in Bohol during the Spanish Era. The other was the Tamblot uprising in 1621 led by Tamblot, a babaylan or native priest from Bohol which was basically a religious conflict.

Unlike the Tamblot revolt, the Dagohoy rebellion was not a religious conflict. Rather, it was like most of the early revolts which were ignited by forced labor (polo y servicios), bandala, excessive tax collection and payment of tributes. On top of these injustices of the Jesuit priests, what triggered Dagohoy most was the refusal of the Jesuit priest to give a Christian burial to his brother who died in a duel. This caused Dagohoy to call upon his fellow Boholanos to raise arms against the colonial government. The rebellion outlasted several Spanish governors-general and several missions.

In 1744, Gaspar Morales, the Jesuit curate of Inabanga, ordered Francisco's brother, Sagarino, who was a constable, to capture an apostate fugitive. Sagarino pursued the fugitive, but the latter resisted and killed him. Morales refused to give Sagarino a Christian burial because he had died in a duel, a practice banned by the Church. (Note: Constantino claimed that Dagohoy's brother Sagarino was a renegade who had abandoned the Christian religion and that Father Morales ordered a native constable to arrest Sagarino. Sagarino resisted arrest and killed the constable before he himself died.)

Infuriated, Francisco instigated the people to rise in arms. The signal of the uprising was the killing of Giuseppe Lamberti, Italian Jesuit curate of Jagna, in January 1745. The rebellion rolled over the whole island like a typhoon; Morales was killed by Dagohoy afterward. Bishop of Cebu, Miguel Lino de Espeleta, who exercised ecclesiastical authority over Bohol, tried in vain to mollify the rebellious Boholanos.

=== Bohol revolutionary government ===
Dagohoy continually defeated the Spanish forces sent against him. He established an independent government in the mountains of Bohol on December 20, 1745, and had 3,000 followers, which subsequently increased to 20,000. His followers remained unsubdued in their mountains stronghold and, even after Dagohoy's death, continued to defy Spanish power.

One reason for his success is his reliance on collective farming practices. After the death of Spanish landlords, the farmers wanted to begin farming again. Many farmers wanted to institute land reform but the Revolutionary Cabinet decided that they should work in umahang communal or communal farms. Farmers would be the owners of the farms they would work in and have a say in its affairs. More than 15 dozen farms were collectivized in Bohol. This helped the revolution to have the least amount of food shortages no matter the turbulent weather and made the Bohol of today an agricultural powerhouse.

A cave in Danao was the headquarters of Dagohoy. Many passages within Dagohoy's cave led underwater to dry land, and it is said that every time Spaniards searched the cave, Dagohoy could swim underwater through this passage to hide in the breathing space.

The Jesuit missionaries were recalled to Spain at the end of the 18th Century and replaced with the Augustinian Recollect order who met with Dagohoy and attempted to appease him and get him to leave his stronghold, but he responded that it had become of the home of the people living there and they wanted only to live a free life.

Twenty Spanish governors-general, from Gasper de la Torre (1739–1745) to Juan Antonio Martínez (1822–1825), tried to quell the rebellion and failed. In 1825, Mariano Ricafort Palacin (1825–1830) became governor-general of the Philippines. Upon his order, alcalde-mayor Jose Lazaro Cairo, at the head of 2,200 Filipino-Spanish troops and several batteries, invaded Bohol on May 7, 1827. The Boholanos resisted fiercely. Cairo won several engagements but failed to crush the rebellion.

== Death ==
Francisco Dagohoy probably died before 1829. He did not die because of his staunch opposition of the Spaniards, but rather, peacefully from old age and sickness.

== Legacy ==
Dagohoy features in the Bohol provincial flag as one of the two bolos or native swords with handle and hand-guards on top. These two bolos, which are reclining respectively towards the left and right, depict the Dagohoy and Tamblot revolts.

Dagohoy is acknowledged in Philippine history as the initiator of the longest insurrection on record. His revolt lasted 85 years (1744–1829).

A film based on his life starring Mario Montenegro as Dagohoy and directed by Gregorio Fernandez was released in 1953.

The town of Dagohoy, Bohol is named in his honor. It was the former President Carlos P. Garcia (then Vice President), a Boholano, who proposed the name.

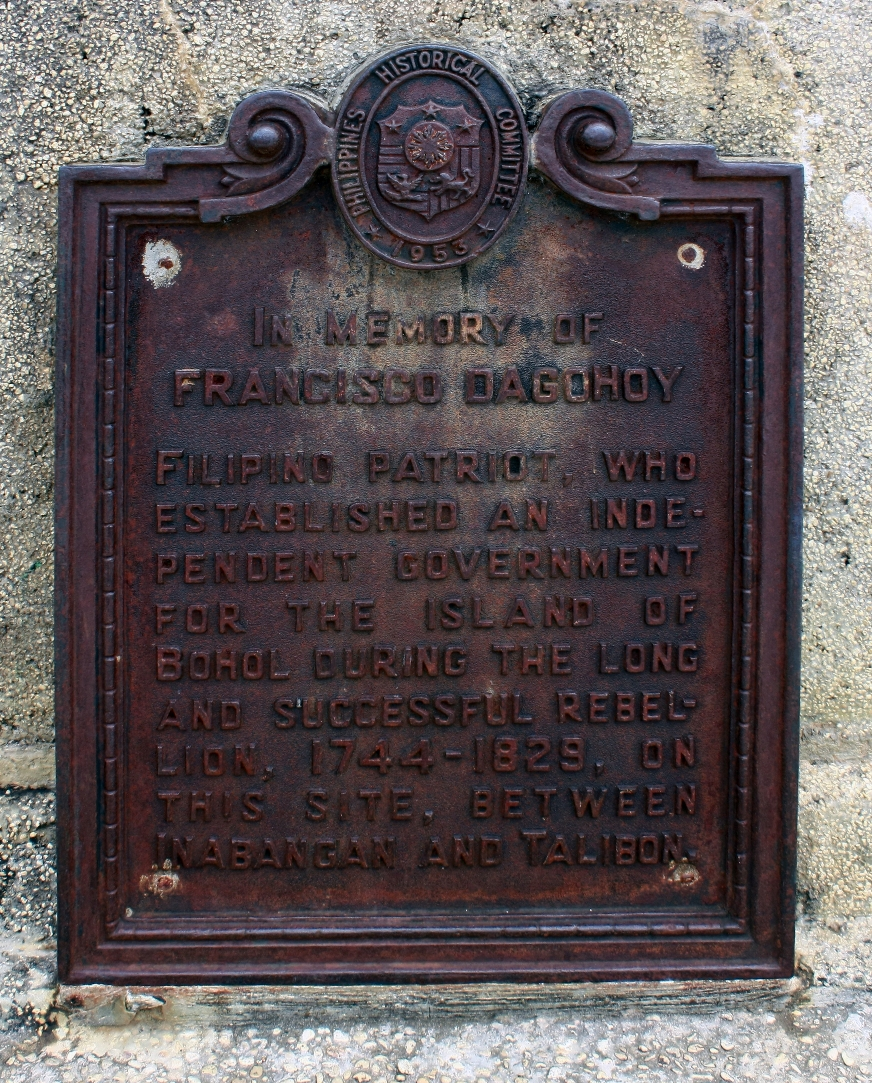
National historical marker installed in 1955 in Danao, Bohol

A historical marker on Dagohoy's grave in the mountains of Danao, Bohol has been placed in his honor. The Dagohoy Marker in Magtangtang, Danao,92 km (57 mi) from Tagbilaran was placed by the Philippine Historical Committee to honor the heroic deeds of Dagohoy. Magtangtang was Dagohoy's headquarters or hideout during the revolt. Hundreds of Dagohoy's followers preferred death inside the cave than surrender. Their skeletons still remain in the site.

The Dagohoy Memorial National High School in Dagohoy, Bohol and Francisco Dagohoy Memorial High School in Magtangtang, Danao, Bohol are named in his honor.

Ships from the Philippine Navy and Bureau of Fisheries and Aquatic Resources was named after him.

== Sources ==
- Tirol, Jes (4 June 2006). "Abatan River Cruise: A travel through history". Bohol Chronicle. Archived from the original on March 9, 2008.
- Bohol-Philippines.com (16 January 2008). "Francisco Dagohoy: A Slice of History and Myth". Archived from the original on January 16, 2008.
- Hellingman, Jeroen (4 April 2002). "A Short History of Bohol (Part I)". IJsselstein. Archived from the original on June 1, 2002.
- Hellingman, Jeroen (5 October 2003). "Bohol, Cave Country". IJsselstein. Archived from the original on May 26, 2004.
- Constantino, Renato; Constantino, Letizia R. (1975). The Philippines: A Past Revisited. Tala Publishing Series. ISBN 9789718958001.
- Zaide, Gregorio F. (1957). Philippine Political and Cultural History. Vol. I. Philippine Education Company. ASIN B008Q24O10.
