= Battle of Lonoy =

- Part of Philippine–American War
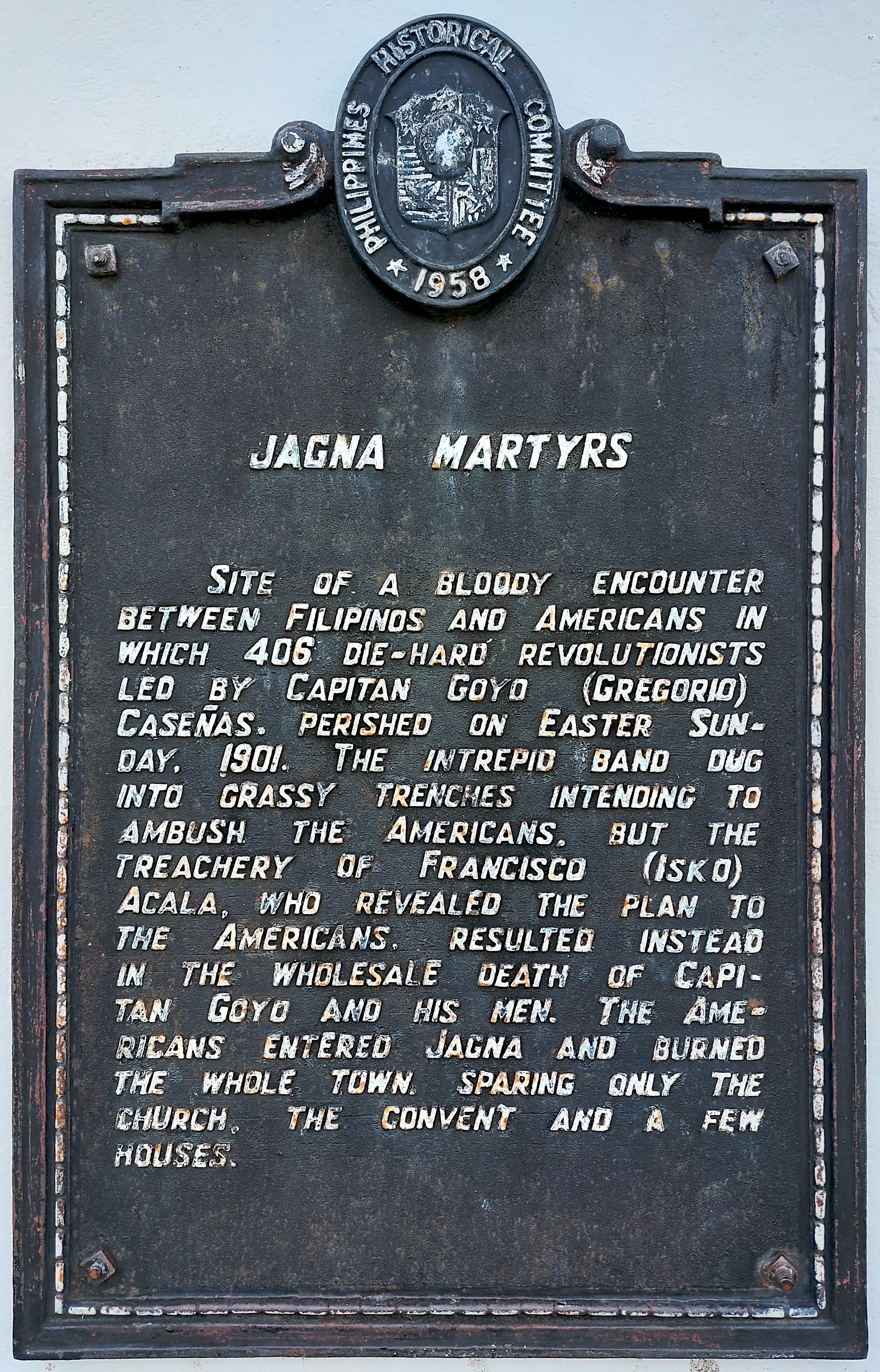
- 1958 Philippines Historical Committee commemorating the battle and subsequent burning of Jagna town proper
Date	5 March 1901
Location	Lonoy, Jagna, Bohol, Philippines
Result	American victory

Belligerents
First Philippine Republic	United States

Commanders and leaders
Captain Gregorio Casenas †	Not Defined

Strength
413 Bohol natives	Unknown

Casualties and losses
Over 406 killed	3 killed, 10 wounded

The Battle of Lonoy, also known as the Lonoy Massacre, was a surprise attack in 1901 during the Philippine–American War when over 400 Filipino revolutionaries were killed by United States Armed Forces. It was fought in Lonoy, Jagna, Bohol on Bohol island.

Filipino forces laid an ambush along a narrow path. They were poorly armed, with daggers, machetes, and spears and few firearms. The American force learned of the ambush from a pro-American local, Captain Francisco Acala, the last Spanish Mayor of Jagna. He led the Americans to the rear of the Filipinos. In a surprise attack, the Filipinos found themselves trapped in their own trenches. All but seven were killed, a total 406, including the commander, Captain Gregorio "Guyo" Casenas. Americans casualties were three killed and ten wounded, which came toward the end when the Filipinos launched a counter-attack.

On April 24, 2011, Captain Casenas and his men were honored by the municipality of Jagna with a statue at the municipal's plaza.
