= Jagna =

Municipality in Bohol, Philippines

- Municipality
- Municipality of Jagna
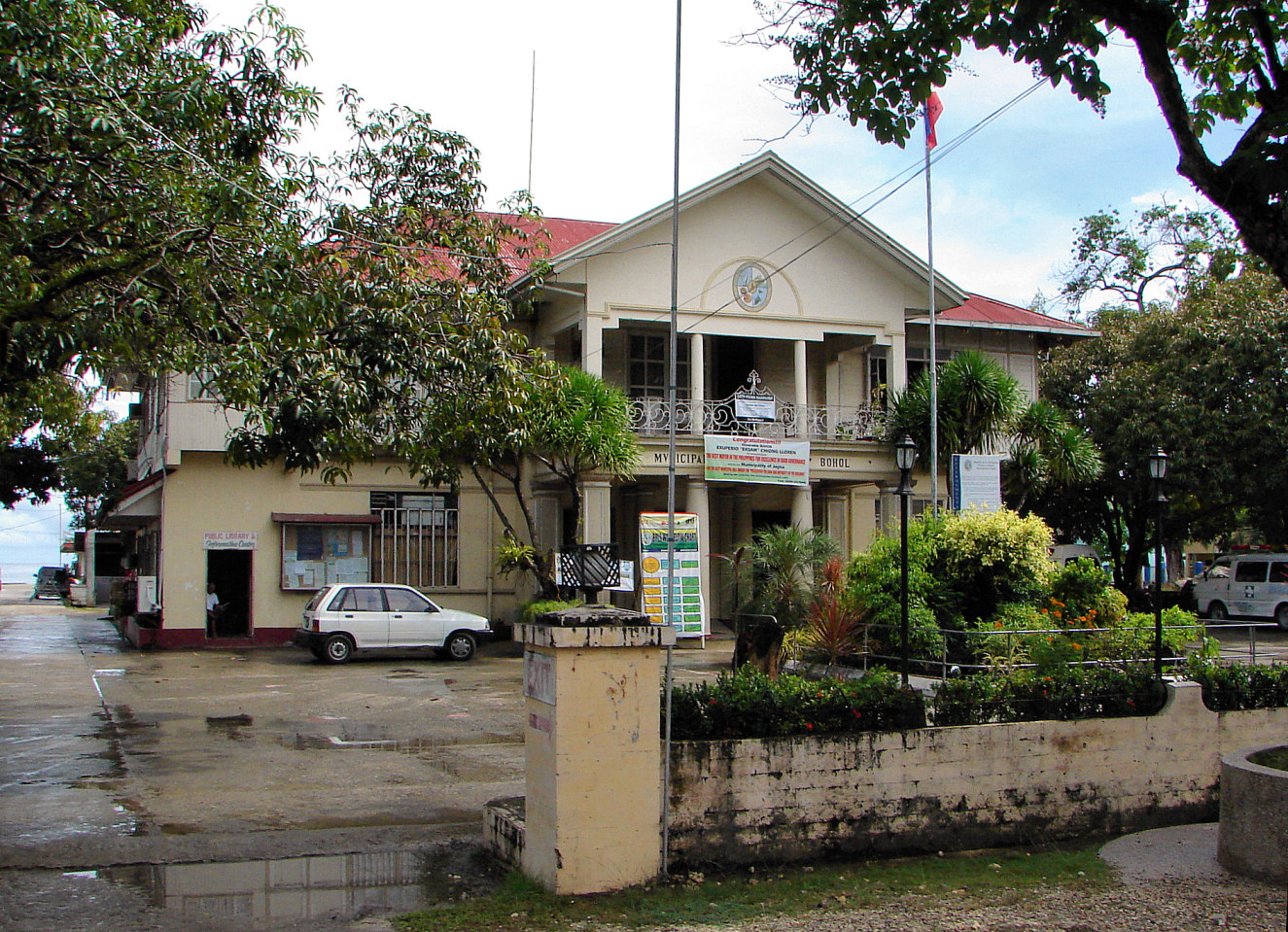
- Jagna Town Hall

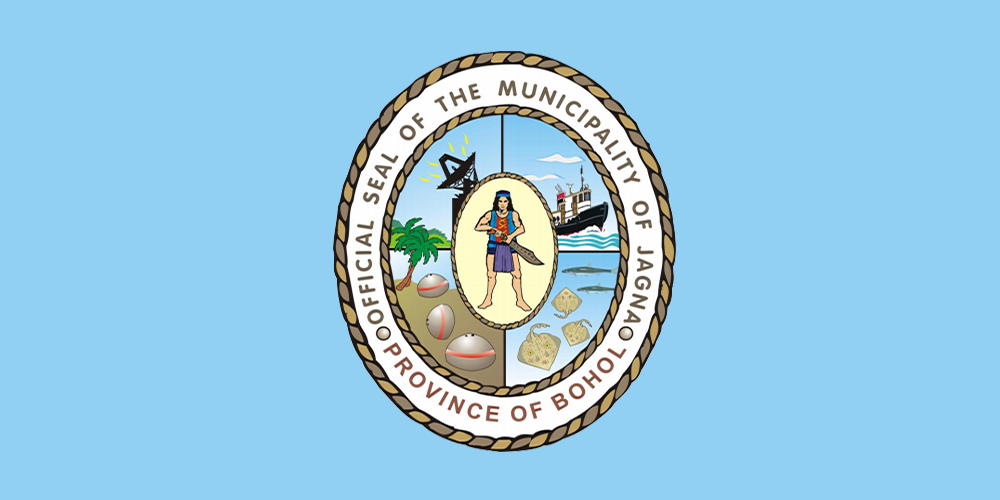
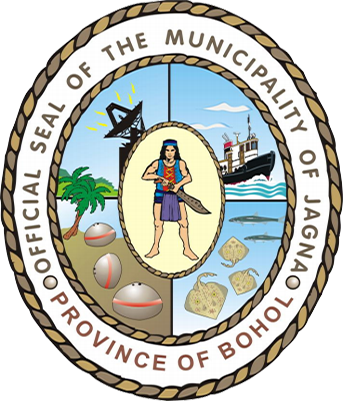
- Flag Seal

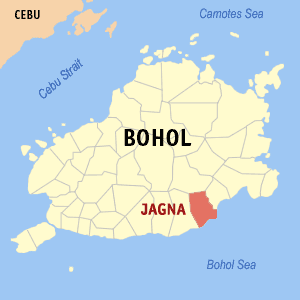
- Map of Bohol with Jagna highlighted
- Interactive map of Jagna
- Location within the Philippines
- Coordinates: 9°39′N 124°22′E
- Country: Philippines
- Region: Central Visayas
- Province: Bohol
- District: 3rd district
- Founded: 29 September 1631
- Barangays: 33 (see Barangays)

Government
  - Type: Sangguniang Bayan
  - Mayor: Mark Louie R. Monungolh
  - Vice Mayor: Derrick C. Virtudazo
  - Representative: Kristine Alexie B. Tutor
  - Municipal Council: Members: Bonifacio J. Virtudes, Jr.; Jema Pagulon-Virtudes; Rodrigo B. Lloren; Anthony R. Aniscal; Gevelo B. Aceron; Emmanuel Jude S. Bernido; Yvonne G. Acera; Alfeo S. Tadena, Jr.; NB COMELEC
  - Electorate: 24,536 voters (2025)

Area
  - Total: 168.49 km^{2} (65.05 sq mi)
- Elevation: 106 m (348 ft)
- Highest elevation: 641 m (2,103 ft)
- Lowest elevation: 0 m (0 ft)

Population (2024 census)
  - Total: 36,674
  - Density: 217.66/km^{2} (563.74/sq mi)
  - Households: 8,381

Economy
  - Income class: 2nd municipal income class
  - Poverty incidence: 24.91% (2023)
  - Revenue: ₱ 212.4 million (2024)
  - Assets: ₱ 739.9 million (2024)
  - Expenditure: ₱ 126.8 million (2024)
  - Liabilities: ₱ 212.8 million (2024)

Service provider
  - Electricity: Bohol 2 Electric Cooperative (BOHECO 2)
- Time zone: UTC+8 (PST)
- ZIP code: 6308
- PSGC: 071225000
- IDD : area code: +63 (0)38
- Native languages: Boholano dialect Cebuano; Tagalog

Jagna, officially the Municipality of Jagna (Cebuano: Munisipalidad sa Jagna; Tagalog: Bayan ng Jagna), is a municipality in the province of Bohol, Philippines. According to the 2024 census, it has a population of 36,674 people.

The town celebrates St. Michael's festival on September 29. Highlights are cultural activities such as parades and street dancing. The month of May is also of interest, especially to returning Jagna-born Filipinos from across the islands and abroad. Celebrations of barangay fiestas occur almost every day.

== History ==
On January 24, 1744, an Italian Jesuit curate in-charge of the town parish was killed by a native insurgent known to be Francisco Dagohoy. This event signaled the beginning of the Dagohoy Rebellion – the longest uprising in Philippine history.

The Lonoy Massacre in 1901 was a bloody American surprise attack launched on Filipino insurgents – the latter being led by Captain Gregorio Caseñas (Note: who now features at the centre of the municipal seal) – which killed over 400, in the Philippine–American War. It was fought in the mountain village of Lonoy, north of the town proper.

A major earthquake devastated the town in 1990. The local residents were evacuated to the nearby hills for a few days, as local authorities warned of a possible tsunami that might hit the coastal area. However, such event did not happen. Some damage occurred to the church bell tower by the earthquake but has been completely repaired.

Jagna has a new market; the last one burned down in 1998 and a temporary market was set up in the grass field across the church. The new market is in operation – built on the site of the previous one that burned down. A recreational plaza is on the grass field that was once the temporary market area.

== Geography ==
Jagna is located on the southern coast of Bohol. It is one of the commercial trading centers of the province with daily market and port operations. Of interest to visitors is the town church built during the Spanish era, with its ceiling frescoes and baroque architecture. A waterfall and a spring reservoir can be found on the highlands, accessible by road travel north. A marine sanctuary zone has been set up by the local government just off the shore. A double reef is protected inside the sanctuary zone and marked off by buoys to restrict access from fishers.

Like Tagbilaran, Jagna is a port town. Ferries travel daily to and from other islands. Routes to Mindanao are available via Cagayan de Oro and Butuan. The island of Camiguin is visible from Jagna and a ferry operates from Jagna to the port of Balbagon in peak seasons. Jagna is 68 kilometres (42 mi) from Tagbilaran.

=== Barangays ===
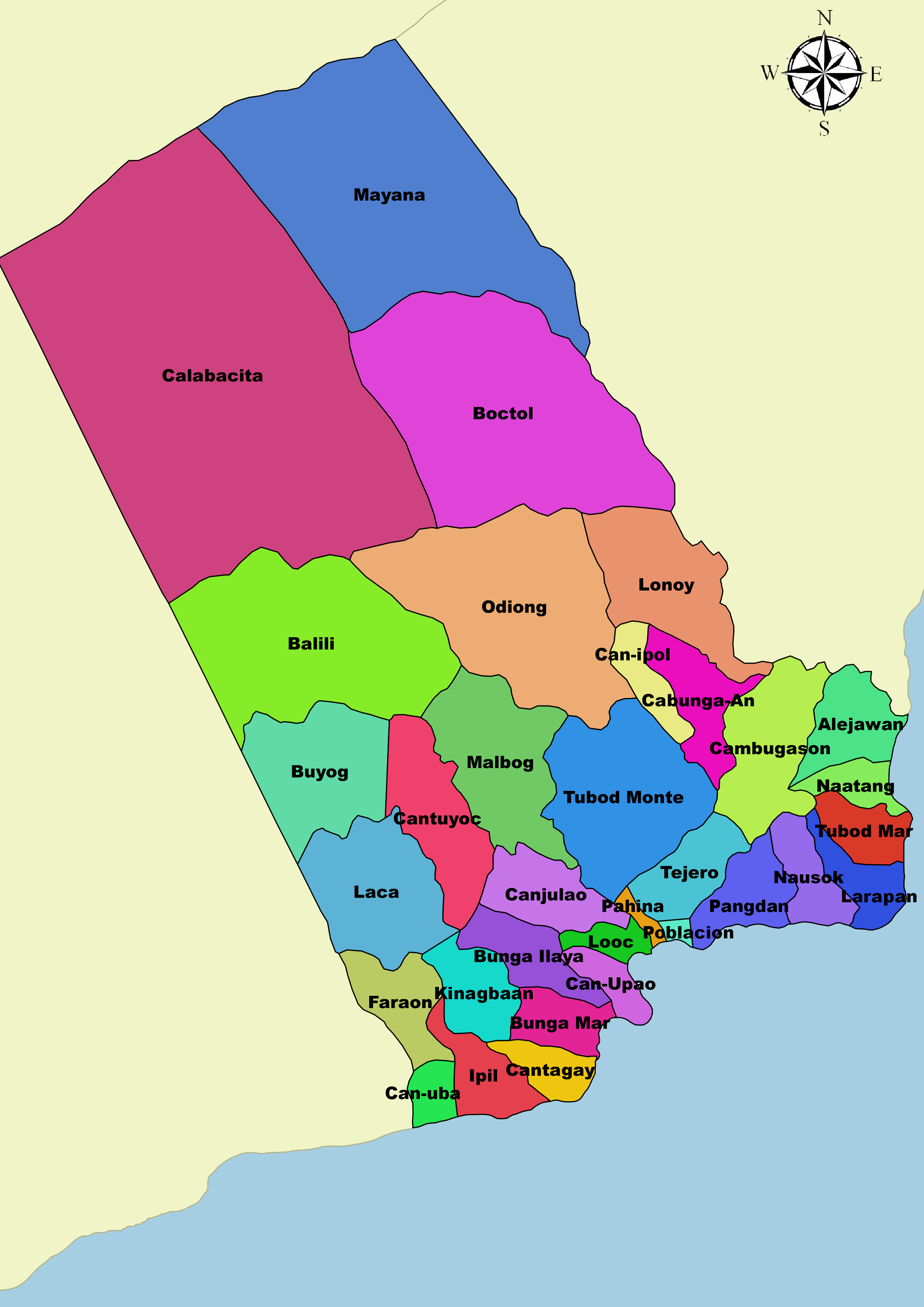
Map of Jagna showing its barangays

Jagna is politically subdivided into 33 barangays. Each barangay consists of puroks and some have sitios.

PSGC	Barangay	Population			±% p.a.	
		2024		2010		
071225001	Alejawan	2.2%	817	843	▾	−0.22%
071225002	Balili	3.4%	1,233	1,263	▾	−0.17%
071225003	Boctol	3.0%	1,103	1,023	▴	0.52%
071225005	Bunga Ilaya	2.7%	994	816	▴	1.38%
071225006	Bunga Mar	4.0%	1,459	1,385	▴	0.36%
071225004	Buyog	0.9%	344	386	▾	−0.80%
071225007	Cabunga‑an	3.7%	1,344	1,179	▴	0.91%
071225008	Calabacita	3.9%	1,419	1,362	▴	0.29%
071225009	Cambugason	2.9%	1,071	993	▴	0.53%
071225010	Can‑ipol	1.4%	505	511	▾	−0.08%
071225014	Can‑uba	1.0%	378	343	▴	0.68%
071225015	Can‑upao	5.6%	2,067	2,037	▴	0.10%
071225011	Canjulao	7.8%	2,870	2,752	▴	0.29%
071225012	Cantagay	2.5%	915	834	▴	0.65%
071225013	Cantuyoc	2.3%	830	884	▾	−0.44%
071225016	Faraon	1.6%	581	547	▴	0.42%
071225017	Ipil	0.9%	321	319	▴	0.04%
071225018	Kinagbaan	1.3%	466	436	▴	0.46%
071225019	Laca	0.7%	257	316	▾	−1.43%
071225020	Larapan	2.1%	778	764	▴	0.13%
071225021	Lonoy	3.5%	1,286	1,259	▴	0.15%
071225022	Looc	2.0%	740	865	▾	−1.08%
071225023	Malbog	2.9%	1,078	1,031	▴	0.31%
071225024	Mayana	6.1%	2,235	1,482	▴	2.89%
071225025	Naatang	1.6%	583	580	▴	0.04%
071225026	Nausok	1.0%	349	348	▴	0.02%
071225027	Odiong	2.7%	979	1,023	▾	−0.30%
071225028	Pagina	3.5%	1,297	1,405	▾	−0.55%
071225029	Pangdan	3.2%	1,177	1,197	▾	−0.12%
071225030	Poblacion (Pondol)	2.4%	885	1,020	▾	−0.98%
071225031	Tejero	3.9%	1,440	1,412	▴	0.14%
071225032	Tubod Mar	1.5%	538	516	▴	0.29%
071225033	Tubod Monte	4.2%	1,553	1,435	▴	0.55%
	Total		36,674	32,566	▴	0.83%

=== Climate ===
Climate data for Jagna, Bohol
Month	Jan	Feb	Mar	Apr	May	Jun	Jul	Aug	Sep	Oct	Nov	Dec	Year
Mean daily maximum °C (°F)	28 (82)	29 (84)	30 (86)	31 (88)	31 (88)	30 (86)	30 (86)	30 (86)	30 (86)	29 (84)	29 (84)	29 (84)	30 (85)
Mean daily minimum °C (°F)	23 (73)	22 (72)	23 (73)	23 (73)	24 (75)	25 (77)	24 (75)	24 (75)	24 (75)	24 (75)	23 (73)	23 (73)	24 (74)
Average precipitation mm (inches)	102 (4.0)	85 (3.3)	91 (3.6)	75 (3.0)	110 (4.3)	141 (5.6)	121 (4.8)	107 (4.2)	111 (4.4)	144 (5.7)	169 (6.7)	139 (5.5)	1,395 (55.1)
Average rainy days	18.6	14.8	16.5	16.7	23.9	26.4	25.6	24.1	24.4	26.3	23.7	20.5	261.5
Source: Meteoblue

== Government ==
The municipality is governed by the Local Government Unit (LGU) of Jagna, which is headed by the Municipal Mayor.

- Cruz Abrenilla (1882–1884)
- Severo Salas (1886–1898)
- Quintin Abrenilla (1902–1906)
- Agustin Abrenilla (1906–1912)
- Catalino Caseñas (1912–1916)
- Agustin Abrenilla (1916–1922)
- Juan Virtudes (1922–1931)
- Simplicio Cagampang (1931–1940)
- Ubaldo Yap (1941–1946)
- Antonio Galope (1946–1955)
- Teodoro B. Galagar (1955–1965)
- Agripino Jamisola (1965–August 1967)
- Glicerio Madrazo (November–December 1967)
- Alexander C. Villacastin (1968–1971)
- Hitty Domingo Bagaipo (1972–1980)
- Alexander C. Villacastin (1980–1986)
- Cesar M. Cagulada (1986–1988)
- Alexander C. Villacastin (1988–1995)
- Marciana O. Tsurumi (1995–2001)
- Exuperio C. Lloren (2001–2010)
- Fortunato R. Abrenilla (2010–2018)
- Bonifacio J. Virtudes Jr. (2018–2019)
- Joseph A. Rañola (2019–2025)

== Demographics ==
Population census of Jagna
Year	Pop.	±% p.a.
1903	4,331	—
1918	6,643	+2.89%
1939	12,384	+3.01%
1948	15,804	+2.75%
1960	12,177	−2.15%
1970	14,338	+1.65%
1975	15,903	+2.10%
1980	16,769	+1.07%
1990	21,135	+2.34%
1995	23,927	+2.35%
2000	26,826	+2.48%
2007	27,852	+0.52%
2010	32,566	+5.86%
2015	33,892	+0.76%
2020	35,832	+1.18%
2024	36,674	+0.56%
Source: Philippine Statistics Authority

== Economy ==
Poverty incidence of Jagna (%)

Source: Philippine Statistics Authority

== Education ==
Jagna as a key center for learning, the municipality boasts a cluster of respected educational institutions. It hosts many notable educational institutions in the southern part of Bohol including:

- Bohol Institute of Technology
- Calabacita National High School
- Central Visayan Institute Foundation
- Colegio de la Medalla Milagrosa
- Faraon National High School
- Jagna High School
- Lonoy Heroes Memorial High School
- San Miguel Academy
- Tubod Monte Integrated School

== Gallery ==
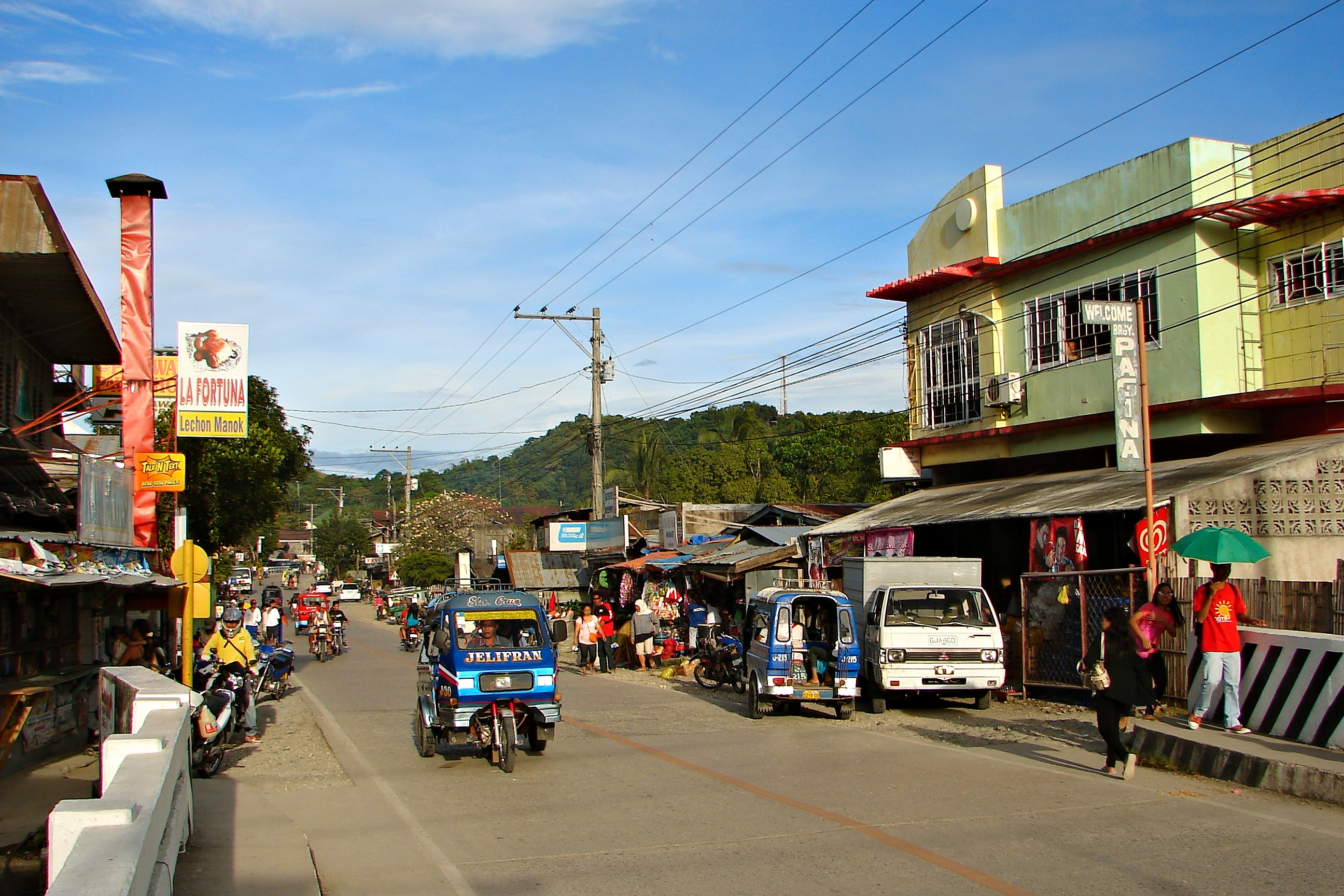
Pagina, Jagna

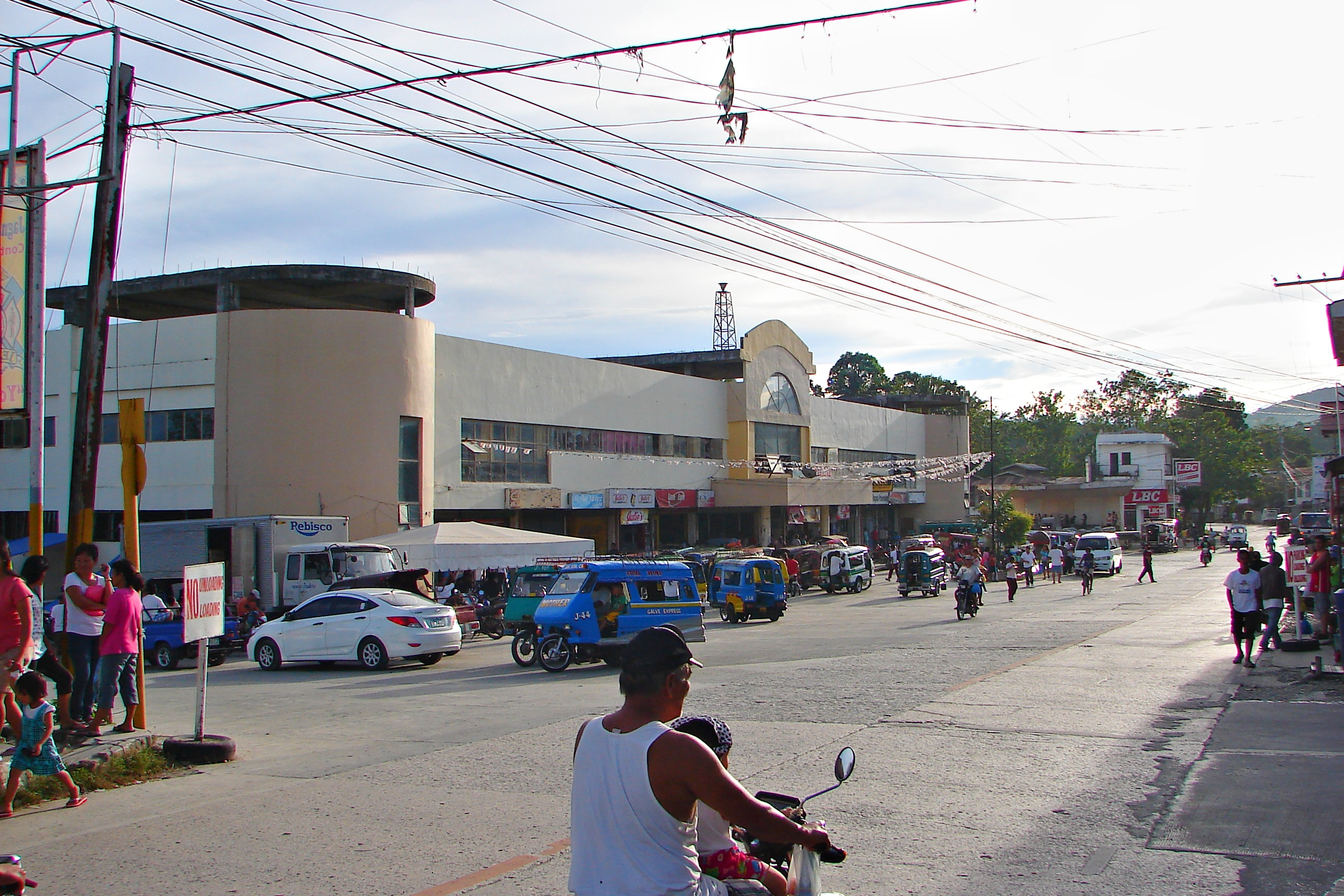
Public market of Jagna

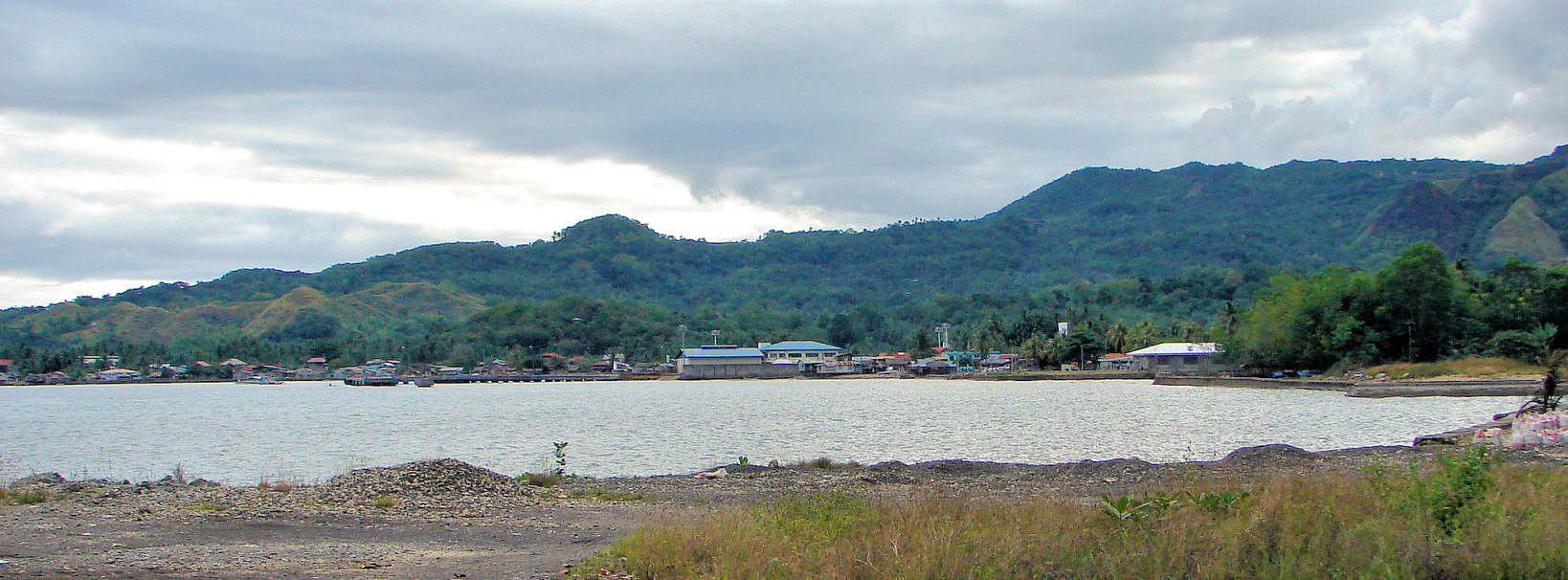
Jagna Bay

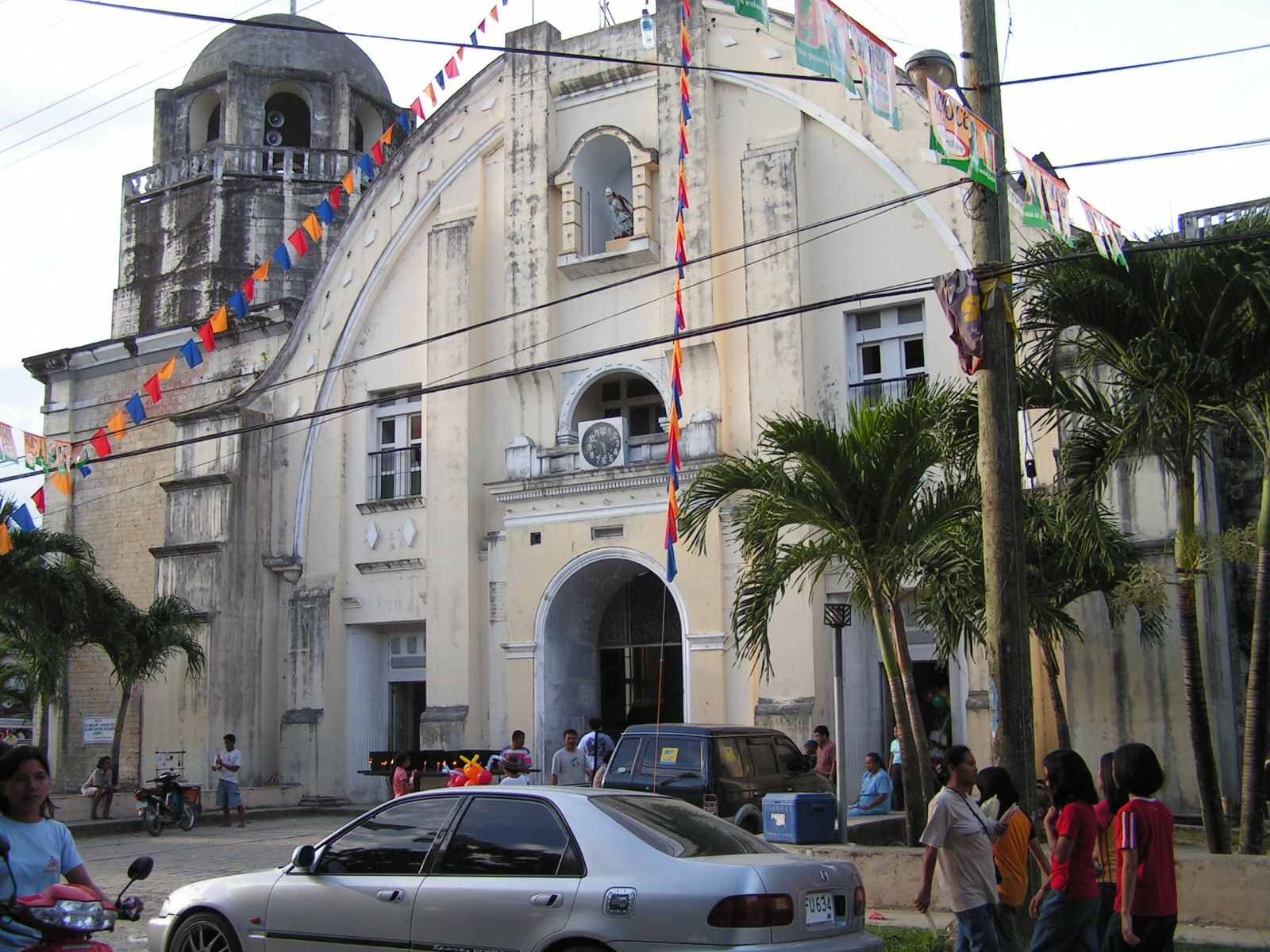
St. Michael the Archangel Parish, Jagna
