= Tamblot uprising =

The Tamblot uprising of 1621, also known as the Tamblot revolution or Tamblot revolt, was led by Tamblot, a babaylan or native priest from the island of Bohol in the Philippines.
