= List of twin towns and sister cities in Asia =

This is a list of places in the continent of Asia which have standing links to local communities in other countries. In most cases, the association, especially when formalised by local government, is known as "town twinning" (usually in Europe) or "sister cities" (usually in the rest of the world), and while most of the places included are towns, the list also includes villages, cities, districts, and counties with similar links.

== Afghanistan ==
Asadabad

- Union City, United States

Ghazni

- Hayward, United States
- Nishapur, Iran

Herat

- Council Bluffs, United States
- Nishapur, Iran

Jalalabad

- San Diego, United States

Kabul

- Ankara, Turkey
- Kazan, Russia

Kandahar

- Council Bluffs, United States

Mazar-i-Sharif

- Dushanbe, Tajikistan
- Mashhad, Iran

== Bahrain ==
Manama

- Ankara, Turkey
- Karachi, Pakistan

== Brunei ==
Bandar Seri Begawan

- Nanjing, China

== Cambodia ==
Phnom Penh

- Bangkok, Thailand
- Beijing, China
- Busan, South Korea
- Chongqing, China
- Hanoi, Vietnam
- Hefei, China
- Ho Chi Minh City, Vietnam
- Incheon, South Korea
- Kitakyushu, Japan
- Kunming, China
- Long Beach, United States
- Lowell, United States
- Shanghai, China
- Shenzhen, China

Sihanoukville

- Maardu, Estonia
- Nanning, China
- Seattle, United States

== Kazakhstan ==
Aktobe

- Karamay, China
- Orenburg, Russia

Almaty

- Alexandria, Egypt
- Bishkek, Kyrgyzstan
- Daegu, South Korea
- Ho Chi Minh City, Vietnam
- Istanbul, Turkey
- Jeddah, Saudi Arabia
- Malatya, Turkey
- Modena, Italy
- Moscow, Russia
- Nusantara, Indonesia
- Rennes, France
- Riga, Latvia
- Rosario, Argentina
- Saint Petersburg, Russia
- San José, Costa Rica
- Tashkent, Uzbekistan
- Tel Aviv, Israel
- Tucson, United States
- Ürümqi, China
- Vilnius, Lithuania

Astana

- Amman, Jordan
- Ankara, Turkey
- Ashgabat, Turkmenistan
- Bangkok, Thailand
- Beijing, China
- Bishkek, Kyrgyzstan
- Damascus, Syria
- Gdańsk, Poland
- Hanoi, Vietnam
- Islamabad, Pakistan
- Kazan, Russia
- Kyiv, Ukraine
- Moscow, Russia
- Nice, France
- Oulu, Finland
- Putrajaya, Malaysia
- Riga, Latvia
- Saint Petersburg, Russia
- Seoul, South Korea
- Tashkent, Uzbekistan
- (Georgia (country)) Tbilisi, Georgia
- Ufa, Russia
- Ulaanbaatar, Mongolia
- Uşak, Turkey
- Vilnius, Lithuania
- Warsaw, Poland

Karaganda

- Cluj-Napoca, Romania
- Songpa (Seoul), South Korea

Kokshetau

- Waukesha, United States

Kostanay

- Kirklees, England, United Kingdom

Kyzylorda

- Arvada, United States
- Bolu, Turkey
- Bursa, Turkey

Oral

- Kostroma, Russia
- Manisa, Turkey
- Orenburg, Russia
- Ostrava, Czech Republic

Oskemen

- Babruysk, Belarus
- Barnaul, Russia
- Tacheng, China

Petropavl

- Omsk, Russia

Shymkent

- Acharnes, Greece
- Baiyin, China
- Khujand, Tajikistan
- Pattaya, Thailand
- Stevenage, England, United Kingdom
- Vanadzor, Armenia

== Kuwait ==
Ahmadi

- Ho Chi Minh City, Vietnam

Kuwait City

- Ankara, Turkey
- Florence, Italy
- Gaziantep, Turkey
- Guangzhou, China
- Mexico City, Mexico
- Rosario, Argentina
- Sarajevo, Bosnia and Herzegovina
- Tunis, Tunisia

== Kyrgyzstan ==
Bishkek

- Almaty, Kazakhstan
- Ankara, Turkey
- Ashgabat, Turkmenistan
- Astana, Kazakhstan
- Colorado Springs, United States
- Doha, Qatar
- Gumi, South Korea
- İzmir, Turkey
- Kyiv, Ukraine
- Lianyungang, China
- Qazvin, Iran
- Samsun, Turkey
- Shenzhen, China
- Tashkent, Uzbekistan
- Tehran, Iran
- Tianjin, China
- Trabzon, Turkey
- Ufa, Russia
- Ulaanbaatar, Mongolia
- Ürümqi, China
- Wuhan, China
- Yinchuan, China

Özgön

- Bolu, Turkey
- Yıldırım, Turkey

== Laos ==
Champasak

- Da Nang, Vietnam
- Ho Chi Minh City, Vietnam
- Nanning, China

Luang Prabang

- Chengdu, China

Vientiane

- Beijing, China
- Elgin, United States
- Ho Chi Minh City, Vietnam
- Kunming, China

== Lebanon ==
Baalbek

- Bergama, Turkey
- Isfahan, Iran
- Qom, Iran
- Yogyakarta, Indonesia

Beirut

- Aleppo, Syria
- Dubai, United Arab Emirates
- Istanbul, Turkey
- Karachi, Pakistan
- Los Angeles, United States
- Rio de Janeiro, Brazil
- Yerevan, Armenia

Sidon

- Gaza City, Palestine

== Maldives ==
Malé

- Colombo, Sri Lanka
- Suzhou, China

== Mongolia ==
Darkhan

- Dimitrovgrad, Bulgaria
- Irving, United States
- Kaposvár, Hungary
- Ulan-Ude, Russia
- Zeitz, Germany

Erdenet

- Edremit, Turkey
- Fairbanks, United States
- Székesfehérvár, Hungary
- Ulan-Ude, Russia

Kharkhorin

- Bolu, Turkey

Ölgii

- Giresun, Turkey

Ulaanbaatar

- Ankara, Turkey
- Astana, Kazakhstan
- Bangkok, Thailand
- Beijing, China
- Bishkek, Kyrgyzstan
- Bonn, Germany
- Chongqing, China
- Denver, United States
- Elista, Russia
- Gaziantep, Turkey
- Havana, Cuba
- Hohhot, China
- Incheon, South Korea
- Irkutsk, Russia
- Moscow, Russia
- Novosibirsk, Russia
- Seoul, South Korea
- Taipei, Taiwan
- Ulan-Ude, Russia

== Myanmar ==
Mandalay

- Kunming, China

Yangon

- Busan, South Korea
- Fukuoka, Japan
- Haikou, China
- Ho Chi Minh City, Vietnam
- Kathmandu, Nepal
- Kunming, China
- Nanning, China
- Quezon City, Philippines
- Yangzhou, China

== Nepal ==
Banepa

- Shigatse, China

Bharatpur

- Golmud, China

Gorkha

- Rushmoor, England, United Kingdom

Indrawati

- Jersey City, United States

Janakpur

- Ayodhya, India

Kathmandu

- Boulder, United States
- Chengdu, China
- Eugene, United States
- Fredericksburg, United States
- Lhasa, China
- Matsumoto, Japan
- Pyongyang, North Korea
- Rochester, United States
- Varanasi, India
- Xi'an, China
- Yangon, Myanmar

Lalitpur

- Broomfield, United States
- Ulan-Ude, Russia

Pokhara

- Barnet, England, United Kingdom
- Guangzhou, China
- Ithaca, United States
- Kunming, China
- Nyingchi, China
- Princes' Islands, Turkey

Siddharthanagar

- Baoji, China

Tukuche

- Nanto, Japan

== North Korea ==
Chongjin

- Changchun, China

Haeju

- Ulan-Ude, Russia

Hamhung

- Shanghai, China

Kaesong

- Cusco, Peru

Nampo

- Saint Petersburg, Russia
- Weihai, China

Pyongsong

- Pernik, Bulgaria

Pyongyang

- Baghdad, Iraq
- Chiang Mai, Thailand
- Dubai, United Arab Emirates
- Jakarta, Indonesia
- Kathmandu, Nepal
- Moscow, Russia
- Tianjin, China

Sariwon

- Lahore, Pakistan

Wonsan

- Puebla, Mexico
- Vladivostok, Russia

== Oman ==
Muscat

- Cairo, Egypt
- Casablanca, Morocco
- Tunis, Tunisia

== Qatar ==
Doha

- Ankara, Turkey
- (The Gambia) Banjul, Gambia
- Beijing, China
- Beit Sahour, Palestine
- Bishkek, Kyrgyzstan
- Charleston, United States
- Libertador (Caracas), Venezuela
- Marbella, Spain
- Mogadishu, Somalia
- Nicosia, Cyprus
- Port Louis, Mauritius
- Quito, Ecuador
- San Salvador, El Salvador
- Sarajevo, Bosnia and Herzegovina
- Sofia, Bulgaria
- (Georgia (country)) Tbilisi, Georgia
- Tirana, Albania
- Tunis, Tunisia

Al Wakrah

- Djougou, Benin

== Saudi Arabia ==
Jeddah

- Almaty, Kazakhstan
- Baku, Azerbaijan
- Istanbul, Turkey
- Jakarta, Indonesia
- Karachi, Pakistan
- Kuching, Malaysia
- Marbella, Spain
- Oran, Algeria
- Plovdiv, Bulgaria
- Taipei, Taiwan

== Sri Lanka ==
Colombo

- Malé, Maldives
- Saint Petersburg, Russia
- Shanghai, China

Galle

- Velsen, Netherlands

Hambantota

- Guangzhou, China

Jaffna

- Kingston upon Thames, England, United Kingdom
- Sterling Heights, United States

Moratuwa

- Suita, Japan

Nuwara Eliya

- Uji, Japan
- Vidnoye, Russia
- Yongzhou, China

Polonnaruwa

- Kunming, China

== Syria ==
Aleppo

- Beirut, Lebanon
- Gaziantep, Turkey
- Kilis, Turkey
- Osmangazi, Turkey

Damascus

- Ankara, Turkey
- Astana, Kazakhstan
- Bucharest, Romania
- Buenos Aires, Argentina
- Córdoba, Spain
- Dubai, United Arab Emirates
- Istanbul, Turkey
- Toledo, Spain
- Yerevan, Armenia

Homs

- Belo Horizonte, Brazil
- Kayseri, Turkey
- Yazd, Iran

Latakia

- Afyonkarahisar, Turkey
- Yalta, Ukraine

Safita

- Marrickville (Inner West), Australia

Tartus

- Kütahya, Turkey
- Piraeus, Greece
- Tortosa, Spain

== Tajikistan ==
Dushanbe

- Ankara, Turkey
- Ashgabat, Turkmenistan
- Boulder, United States
- Hainan, China
- Klagenfurt, Austria
- Lahore, Pakistan
- Lusaka, Zambia
- Mazar-i-Sharif, Afghanistan
- Minsk, Belarus
- Monastir, Tunisia
- Qingdao, China
- Reutlingen, Germany
- Saint Petersburg, Russia
- Sanaa, Yemen
- Shiraz, Iran
- Tehran, Iran
- Ürümqi, China
- Xiamen, China

Istaravshan

- Krasnoyarsk, Russia

Khujand

- Ağstafa, Azerbaijan
- Lincoln, United States
- Nishapur, Iran
- Samarkand, Uzbekistan
- Orenburg, Russia
- Shymkent, Kazakhstan
- Tabriz, Iran
- Vladimir, Russia

Kulob

- Hamadan, Iran
- Konya, Turkey
- Nishapur, Iran

== Timor-Leste ==
Dili

- Coimbra, Portugal
- Darwin, Australia

== Turkmenistan ==
Arkadag

- Kazan, Russia
- (Georgia (country)) Telavi, Georgia

Ashgabat

- Aktau, Kazakhstan
- Albuquerque, United States
- Ankara, Turkey
- Astana, Kazakhstan
- Athens, Greece
- Bamako, Mali
- Bishkek, Kyrgyzstan
- Dushanbe, Tajikistan
- Kyiv, Ukraine
- Lanzhou, China
- Tashkent, Uzbekistan

Mary

- Istanbul, Turkey
- Oryol, Russia
- Samarkand, Uzbekistan
- Xi'an, China

Türkmenabat

- İzmir, Turkey

Türkmenbaşy

- Astrakhan, Russia

== United Arab Emirates ==
Abu Dhabi

- Bethlehem, Palestine
- Brisbane, Australia
- Cairo, Egypt
- Houston, United States
- Madrid, Spain
- Minsk, Belarus

Dubai

- Amman, Jordan
- Beirut, Lebanon
- Busan, South Korea
- Cape Town, South Africa
- Casablanca, Morocco
- Damascus, Syria
- Detroit, United States
- Frankfurt am Main, Germany
- Gaza City, Palestine
- Gold Coast, Australia
- Guangzhou, China
- Istanbul, Turkey
- Kuala Lumpur, Malaysia
- Moscow, Russia
- Pyongyang, North Korea
- San Juan, Puerto Rico
- San Salvador, El Salvador
- Shanghai, China

Sharjah

- Granada, Spain

== Uzbekistan ==
Bukhara

- Bonn, Germany
- Córdoba, Spain
- Hamadan, Iran
- İzmir, Turkey
- Lahore, Pakistan
- Malatya, Turkey
- Nishapur, Iran
- Orekhovo-Zuyevo, Russia
- Rueil-Malmaison, France
- Santa Fe, United States
- Słupsk, Poland
- Vladimir, Russia
- Yıldırım, Turkey

Samarkand

- Agra, India
- Balkh, Afghanistan
- Banda Aceh, Indonesia
- Cusco, Peru
- Isfahan, Iran
- Jūrmala, Latvia
- Kairouan, Tunisia
- Khujand, Tajikistan
- Krasnoyarsk, Russia
- Lahore, Pakistan
- Liège, Belgium
- Mary, Turkmenistan
- Merv, Turkmenistan
- Mexico City, Mexico
- New Delhi, India
- Nishapur, Iran
- Plovdiv, Bulgaria
- Rio de Janeiro, Brazil
- Samara, Russia
- Xi'an, China

Tashkent

- Almaty, Kazakhstan
- Ankara, Turkey
- Ashgabat, Turkmenistan
- Astana, Kazakhstan
- Berlin, Germany
- Bishkek, Kyrgyzstan
- Cairo, Egypt
- Dnipro, Ukraine
- Karachi, Pakistan
- Kyiv, Ukraine
- Moscow, Russia
- Riga, Latvia
- Seattle, United States
- Seoul, South Korea
- Shanghai, China
- Sverdlovsk, Ukraine

== Yemen ==
Aden

- Shanghai, China

Sanaa

- Ankara, Turkey
- Cairo, Egypt
- Dushanbe, Tajikistan
- Tehran, Iran
