= Dagohoy, Bohol =

Municipality in Bohol, Philippines

Dagohoy
- Municipality
- Municipality of Dagohoy
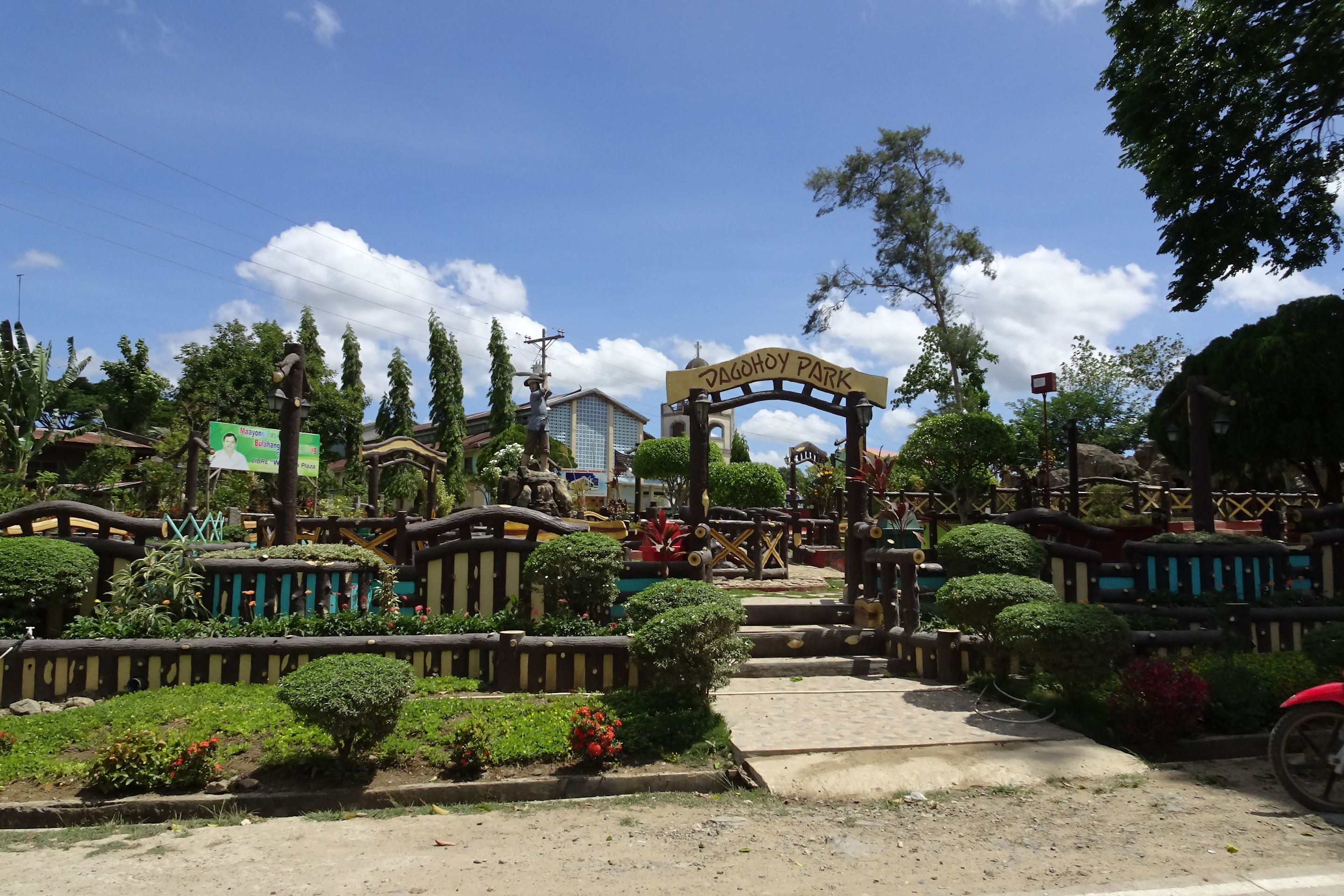
- Dagohoy, Bohol

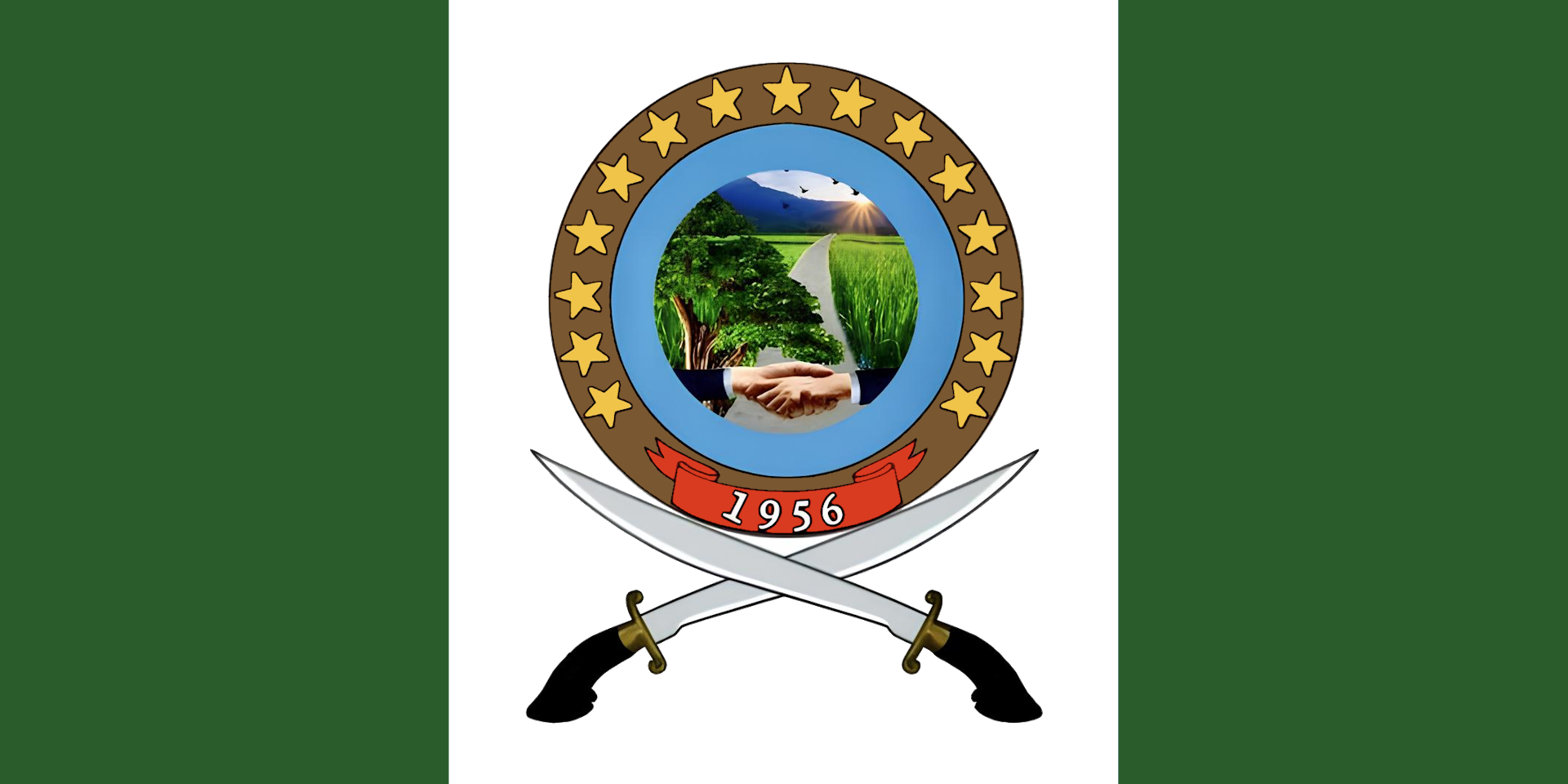
- Flag

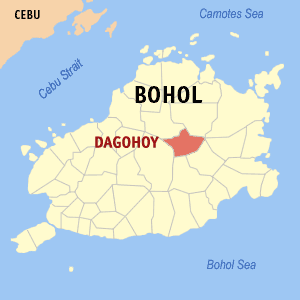
- Map of Bohol with Dagohoy highlighted
- Interactive map of Dagohoy
- Location within the Philippines
- Coordinates: 9°55′N 124°17′E
- Country: Philippines
- Region: Central Visayas
- Province: Bohol
- District: 2nd district
- Founded: 21 June 1956
- Named for: Francisco Dagohoy
- Barangays: 15 (see Barangays)

Government
  - Type: Sangguniang Bayan
  - Mayor: Softronio C. Apat
  - Vice Mayor: Vicente T. Lanoy, Jr.
  - Representative: Vanvan Aumentado
  - Municipal Council: Members: Niño Cesar J. Lagapa; Lloyd L. Evardo; Andres D. Ampoloquio; Allan A. Sasan; Ron Loi M. Apat; Lucio C. Bonio; Ruben L. Logroño; Fritcel Angeli A. Frajele; NB https://ph.rappler.com/elections/2025/local-race/bohol/dagohoy
  - Electorate: 14,027 voters (2025)

Area
  - Total: 77.59 km^{2} (29.96 sq mi)
- Elevation: 151 m (495 ft)
- Highest elevation: 424 m (1,391 ft)
- Lowest elevation: 80 m (260 ft)

Population (2024 census)
  - Total: 20,068
  - Density: 258.6/km^{2} (669.9/sq mi)
  - Households: 4,547

Economy
  - Income class: 4th municipal income class
  - Poverty incidence: 22.15% (2023)
  - Revenue: ₱ 126.6 million (2024)
  - Assets: ₱ 496.5 million (2024)
  - Expenditure: ₱ 76.4 million (2024)
  - Liabilities: ₱ 224.5 million (2024)

Service provider
  - Electricity: Bohol 2 Electric Cooperative (BOHECO 2)
- Time zone: UTC+8 (PST)
- ZIP code: 6322
- PSGC: 071217000
- IDD : area code: +63 (0)38
- Native languages: Boholano dialect Cebuano; Tagalog

Dagohoy, officially the Municipality of Dagohoy (Cebuano: Munisipalidad sa Dagohoy; Tagalog: Bayan ng Dagohoy), is a municipality in the province of Bohol, Philippines. According to the 2024 census, it has a population of 20,068 people.

The town is named after Boholano revolutionary Francisco Dagohoy.

Dagohoy is 73 kilometres (45 mi) from Tagbilaran.

Dagohoy celebrates its fiesta on 10 February, to honor the town patron Our Lady of Lourdes.

== History ==
On 21 June 1956, the municipality of Dagohoy was created through Executive Order No. 184 issued by President Ramon Magsaysay, becoming the 41st town in the province. Former Colonia agricultural colony superintendent Camilo Calceta was appointed first mayor of the town at the age of 84 years. The barrios constituting the new municipality were:

- from the municipality of Carmen
  - Colonia
  - San Vicente
  - Can-oling
  - La Esperanza
  - Villa Aurora
- from the municipality of Ubay
  - Babag
- from the municipality of Sierra Bullones
  - Caluasan
  - San Miguel
  - Candelaria
- from the municipality of Trinidad
  - Mahayag
  - Malitbog
  - Cagawasan
  - Santo Rosario

== Geography ==
=== Barangays ===
Dagohoy is politically subdivided into 15 barangays. Each barangay consists of puroks and some have sitios.

PSGC	Barangay	Population			±% p.a.	
		2024		2010		
071217001	Babag	6.4%	1,278	1,388	▾	−0.57%
071217005	Cagawasan	4.7%	948	1,044	▾	−0.67%
071217006	Cagawitan	3.3%	665	612	▴	0.58%
071217007	Caluasan	9.4%	1,892	1,816	▴	0.29%
071217002	Can‑oling	3.8%	772	985	▾	−1.68%
071217003	Candelaria	5.3%	1,057	1,006	▴	0.34%
071217004	Estaca	2.7%	537	538	▾	−0.01%
071217008	La Esperanza	5.0%	997	1,085	▾	−0.59%
071217009	Mahayag	5.1%	1,016	987	▴	0.20%
071217010	Malitbog	8.1%	1,633	1,509	▴	0.55%
071217011	Poblacion	13.4%	2,692	2,646	▴	0.12%
071217012	San Miguel	13.7%	2,754	2,819	▾	−0.16%
071217013	San Vicente	6.9%	1,386	1,374	▴	0.06%
071217014	Santa Cruz	4.4%	891	850	▴	0.33%
071217015	Villa Aurora	2.3%	456	443	▴	0.20%
	Total		20,068	18,868	▴	0.43%

=== Climate ===
Climate data for Dagohoy, Bohol
Month	Jan	Feb	Mar	Apr	May	Jun	Jul	Aug	Sep	Oct	Nov	Dec	Year
Mean daily maximum °C (°F)	27 (81)	28 (82)	29 (84)	30 (86)	31 (88)	30 (86)	29 (84)	30 (86)	30 (86)	29 (84)	28 (82)	28 (82)	29 (84)
Mean daily minimum °C (°F)	22 (72)	22 (72)	22 (72)	23 (73)	24 (75)	24 (75)	23 (73)	23 (73)	23 (73)	23 (73)	23 (73)	23 (73)	23 (73)
Average precipitation mm (inches)	98 (3.9)	82 (3.2)	96 (3.8)	71 (2.8)	104 (4.1)	129 (5.1)	101 (4.0)	94 (3.7)	99 (3.9)	135 (5.3)	174 (6.9)	143 (5.6)	1,326 (52.3)
Average rainy days	18.0	14.1	17.1	16.8	23.7	25.7	25.8	23.3	24.2	25.9	24.0	20.6	259.2
Source: Meteoblue

== Demographics ==
Population census of Dagohoy

Year	Pop.	±% p.a.
1960	6,699	—
1970	7,291	+0.85%
1975	8,578	+3.31%
1980	9,451	+1.96%

Year	Pop.	±% p.a.
1990	13,121	+3.34%
1995	13,943	+1.15%
2000	16,845	+4.14%
2007	18,311	+1.16%

Year	Pop.	±% p.a.
2010	18,868	+1.10%
2015	19,158	+0.29%
2020	19,874	+0.78%
2024	20,068	+0.23%

Source: Philippine Statistics Authority

== Economy ==
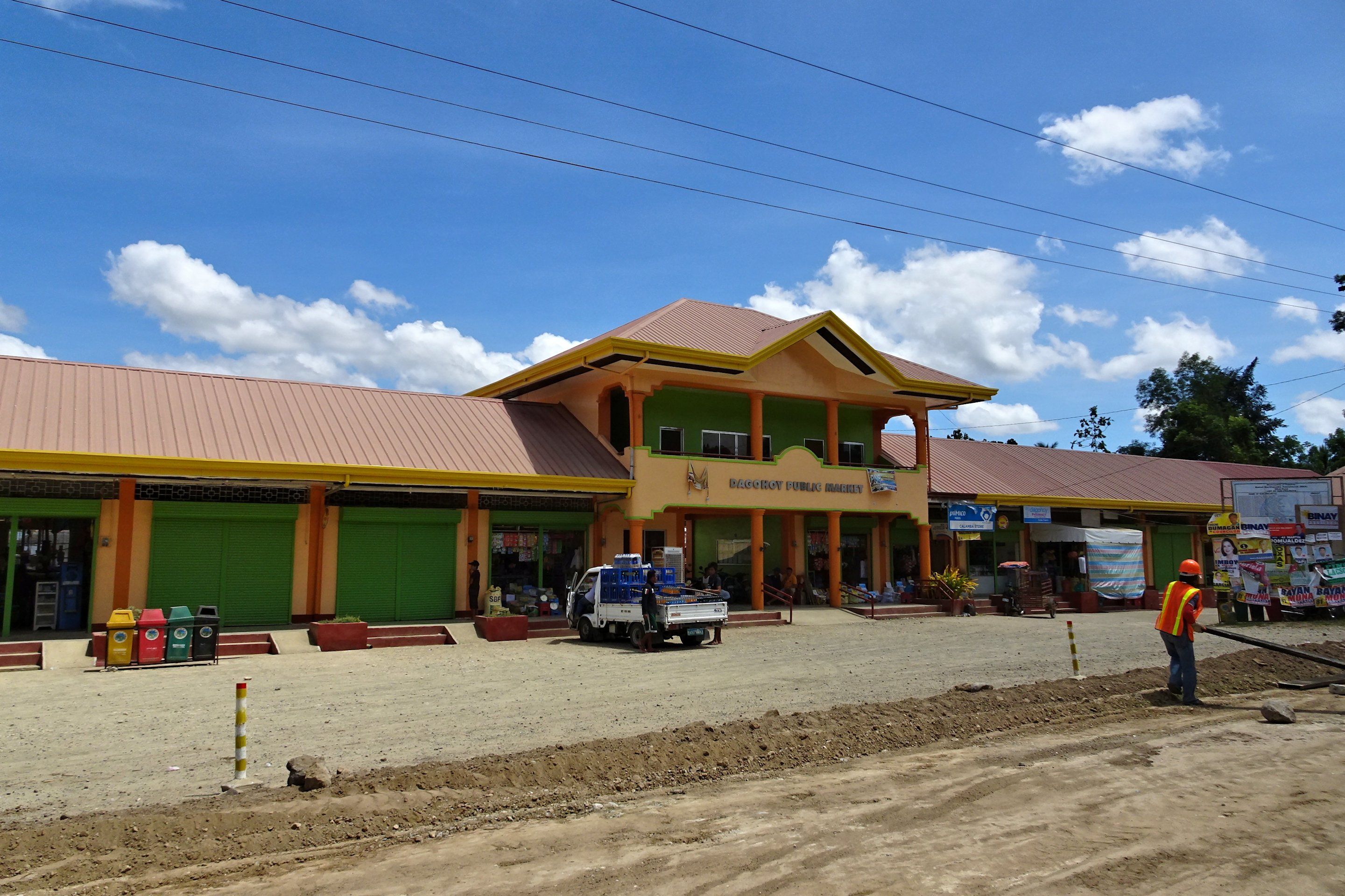
Dagohoy public market

Poverty incidence of Dagohoy (%)

Source: Philippine Statistics Authority

== Sources ==
- Bohol Chronicle (11 Feb 1958). "A new town is born, ailing ex-superintendent named mayor". Archived from the original on 6 Aug 2022.
