= Legislative districts of Bukidnon =

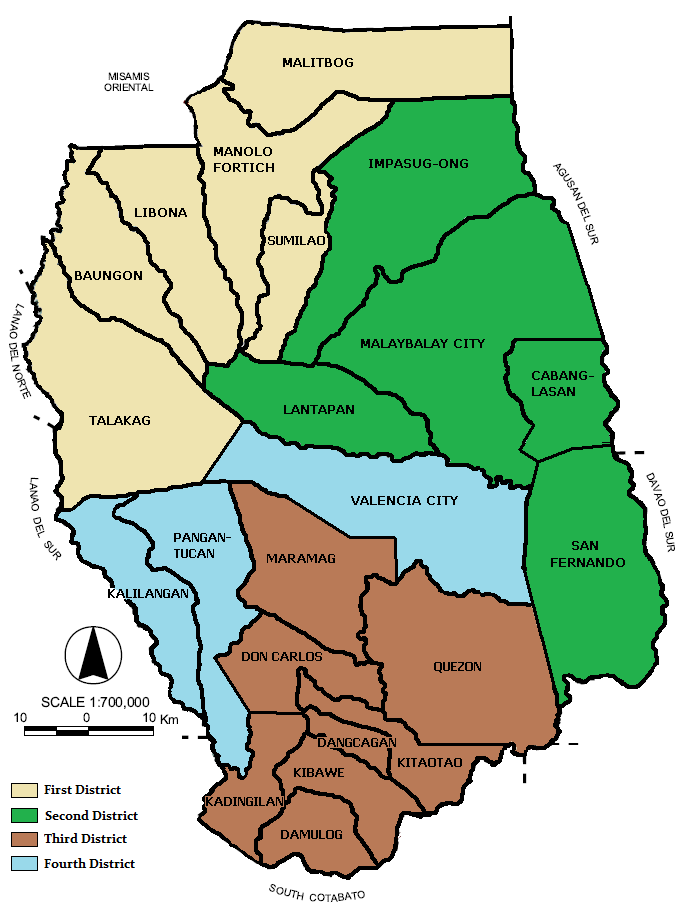
Map showing the current legislative districts of Bukidnon.

The legislative districts of Bukidnon are the representations of the province of Bukidnon in the various national legislatures of the Philippines. The province is currently represented in the lower house of the Congress of the Philippines through its first, second, third, and fourth congressional districts.

== History ==
Prior to gaining separate representation, areas now under the jurisdiction of Bukidnon were represented under the Department of Mindanao and Sulu (1917–1935).

The voters of Bukidnon were finally given the right to elect their own representative through popular vote beginning in 1935 by virtue of Article VI, Section 1 of the 1935 Constitution.

During the Second World War, the Province of Bukidnon sent two delegates to the National Assembly of the Japanese-sponsored Second Philippine Republic: one was the provincial governor (an ex officio member), while the other was elected through a provincial assembly of KALIBAPI members during the Japanese occupation of the Philippines. Upon the restoration of the Philippine Commonwealth in 1945 the province retained its pre-war lone congressional district.

Bukidnon was represented in the Interim Batasang Pambansa as part of Region X from 1978 to 1984, and returned two representatives, elected at-large, to the Regular Batasang Pambansa in 1984.

Under the new Constitution which was proclaimed on February 11, 1987, the province was reapportioned into three congressional districts; each district elected its member to the restored House of Representatives starting that same year.

The approval of Republic Act No. 10184 on September 28, 2012, increased Bukidnon's representation by reapportioning the province into four congressional districts: the municipalities of Kalilangan and Pangantucan were segregated from the first district and the city of Valencia from the second district to form the new fourth district. The reconfigured districts elected their respective representatives beginning in the 2013 elections.

== Current Districts ==
Bukidnon's current congressional delegation is composed of four members since 2013.

Political parties

Lakas–CMD (1)
PFP (1)
Nacionalista (1)
NUP (1)

Legislative districts and representatives of Bukidnon
District	Current Representative		Party	Constituent LGUs	Population (2020)	Area	Map
District	Image	Name	Party	Constituent LGUs	Population (2020)	Area	Map
1st		Jose Manuel Alba (since 2022) Manolo Fortich	NUP	List: Baungon; Libona; Malitbog; Manolo Fortich; Sumilao; Talakag	332,575	2,681.51 km^{2}	
2nd		Jonathan Keith Flores (since 2019) Malaybalay	Lakas–CMD	List: Cabanglasan; Impasugong; Lantapan; Malaybalay; San Fernando	409,880	3,297.07 km^{2}	
3rd		Audrey Zubiri (since 2025) Maramag	PFP	List: Damulog; Dangcagan; Don Carlos; Kadingilan; Kibawe; Kitaotao; Maramag; Quezon	482,016	3,219.57 km^{2}	
4th		Laarni Roque (since 2022) Valencia	Nacionalista	List: Kalilangan; Pangantucan; Valencia	316,837	1,300.44 km^{2}	

== Historical Districts ==
=== Lone District (defunct) ===
Period	Representative
1st National Assembly; 1935–1938	Manuel Fortich (Note: Appointed by the Governor-General to the 1st Commonwealth Congress) (Note: Died on 12 October 1946.)
2nd National Assembly; 1938–1941	Manuel Fortich
1st Commonwealth Congress; 1945	Manuel Fortich
1st Congress; 1946–1949	Manuel Fortich
1st Congress; 1946–1949	Remedios Ozamiz Fortich (Note: Assumed office after winning special election held on March 11, 1947.)
2nd Congress; 1949–1953	Cesar M. Fortich (Note: Appointed Secretary of Agriculture in 1960; seat remained vacant until the end of the 4th Congress.)
3rd Congress; 1953–1957	Cesar M. Fortich
4th Congress; 1957–1961	Cesar M. Fortich
4th Congress; 1957–1961	vacant
5th Congress; 1961–1965	Cesar M. Fortich
6th Congress; 1965–1969	Benjamin N. Tabios
7th Congress; 1969–1972	Cesar M. Fortich

=== 1943-1944 ===
Period	Representatives
National Assembly; 1943–1944	Pedro Carrillo
National Assembly; 1943–1944	Antonio Rubin (ex officio)

=== 1984-1986 ===
Period	Representatives
Regular Batasang Pambansa; 1984–1986	Lorenzo S. Dinlayan
Regular Batasang Pambansa; 1984–1986	Jose Ma. R. Zubiri, Jr.

== See also ==
- Legislative district of Mindanao and Sulu
