= 2022 Philippine House of Representatives elections in Northern Mindanao =

- May 9, 2022
- All 14 Northern Mindanao seats in the House of Representatives
Party	Seats	+/–
PDP–Laban	4	0
Nacionalista	3	0
BPP	2	0
Lakas	2	+1
PADAYN	2	+2
CDP	1	0
This lists parties that won seats. See the complete results below.

The 2022 Philippine House of Representatives elections in Northern Mindanao were held on May 9, 2022.

== Summary ==
Congressional district	Incumbent	Incumbent's party	Winner	Winner's party	Winning margin
Bukidnon–1st	Maria Lourdes Acosta-Alba	BPP	Jose Manuel Alba	BPP	18.76%
Bukidnon–2nd	Jonathan Keith Flores	Nacionalista	Jonathan Keith Flores	Nacionalista	25.42%
Bukidnon–3rd	Manuel Zubiri	BPP	Jose Maria Zubiri Jr.	BPP	16.08%
Bukidnon–4th	Rogelio Neil Roque	PRP	Laarni Roque	Nacionalista	34.20%
Cagayan de Oro–1st	Rolando Uy	NUP	Lordan Suan	Padayon Pilipino	9.34%
Cagayan de Oro–2nd	Rufus Rodriguez	CDP	Rufus Rodriguez	CDP	69.16%
Camiguin	Xavier Jesus Romualdo	PDP–Laban	Jurdin Jesus Romualdo	PDP–Laban	30.48%
Iligan	Frederick Siao	Nacionalista	Celso Regencia	PDP–Laban	3.54%
Lanao del Norte–1st	Mohamad Khalid Dimaporo	PDP–Laban	Mohamad Khalid Dimaporo	PDP–Laban	75.74%
Lanao del Norte–2nd	Abdullah Dimaporo	NPC	Aminah Dimaporo	Lakas	82.28%
Misamis Occidental–1st	Diego Ty	NUP	Jason Almonte	PDP–Laban	17.11%
Misamis Occidental–2nd	Henry Oaminal	Nacionalista	Ando Oaminal	Nacionalista	52.69%
Misamis Oriental–1st	Christian Unabia	Lakas	Christian Unabia	Lakas	4.02%
Misamis Oriental–2nd	Juliette Uy	NUP	Yevgeny Emano	Padayon Pilipino	13.23%

== Bukidnon ==
=== 1st district ===
Incumbent Maria Lourdes Acosta-Alba of Bukidnon Paglaum was term-limited.

Bukidnon Paglaum nominated Acosta-Alba's husband, Jose Manuel Alba, who won the election against former Presidential Adviser for Environmental Protection Nereus Acosta (Independent) and Jun Eligan (Workers' and Peasants' Party).

Candidate	Party	Votes	%
Jose Manuel Alba	Bukidnon Paglaum	90,190	58.98
Nereus Acosta	Independent	61,508	40.22
Jun Eligan	Workers' and Peasants' Party	1,229	0.80
Total		152,927	100.00
Total votes		180,164	–
Registered voters/turnout		205,494	87.67
BPP hold			
Source: Commission on Elections

=== 2nd district ===
Incumbent Jonathan Keith Flores of the Nacionalista Party ran for a second term. He was previously affiliated with PDP–Laban.

Flores won re-election against former Bukidnon indigenous people's mandatory representative Richard Macas (Bukidnon Paglaum).

Candidate	Party	Votes	%
Jonathan Keith Flores (incumbent)	Nacionalista Party	118,031	62.71
Richard Macas	Bukidnon Paglaum	70,192	37.29
Total		188,223	100.00
Total votes		217,793	–
Registered voters/turnout		247,814	87.89
Nacionalista hold			
Source: Commission on Elections

=== 3rd district ===
Incumbent Manuel Zubiri of Bukidnon Paglaum ran for governor of Bukidnon.

Bukidnon Paglaum nominated Zubiri's father, Bukidnon governor Jose Maria Zubiri Jr., who won the election against provincial board member Arlyn Ayon (People's Reform Party) and three other candidates.

Candidate	Party	Votes	%
Jose Maria Zubiri Jr.	Bukidnon Paglaum	128,887	57.50
Arlyn Ayon	People's Reform Party	92,857	41.42
George Paña	Independent	1,024	0.46
Rey Cabaraban	Workers' and Peasants' Party	766	0.34
Alberto Ramilo	Partido Federal ng Pilipinas	632	0.28
Total		224,166	100.00
Total votes		254,258	–
Registered voters/turnout		301,841	84.24
BPP hold			
Source: Commission on Elections

=== 4th district ===
Term-limited incumbent Rogelio Neil Roque of the Nacionalista Party ran for governor of Bukidnon.

Roque endorsed his wife, Laarni Roque, who won the election against Babba Garcia (Bukidnon Paglaum).

Candidate	Party	Votes	%
Laarni Roque	Nacionalista Party	95,837	67.10
Babba Garcia	Bukidnon Paglaum	46,997	32.90
Total		142,834	100.00
Total votes		165,775	–
Registered voters/turnout		189,689	87.39
Nacionalista gain from PRP			
Source: Commission on Elections

== Cagayan de Oro ==
=== 1st district ===
Term-limited incumbent Rolando Uy of the National Unity Party (NUP) ran for mayor of Cagayan de Oro. He was previously affiliated with PDP–Laban.

The NUP nominated Uy's son, Cagayan de Oro vice mayor Joaquin Uy, who was defeated by city councilor Lordan Suan of Padayon Pilipino. Tito Mora (Bagumbayan–VNP) also ran for representative.

Candidate	Party	Votes	%
Lordan Suan	Padayon Pilipino	76,832	54.10
Joaquin Uy	National Unity Party	63,567	44.76
Tito Mora	Bagumbayan–VNP	1,607	1.13
Total		142,006	100.00
Total votes		151,492	–
Registered voters/turnout		177,163	85.51
Padayon Pilipino gain from NUP			
Source: Commission on Elections

=== 2nd district ===
Incumbent Rufus Rodriguez of the Centrist Democratic Party ran for a second term.

Rodriguez won re-election against Irene Floro (People's Reform Party).

Candidate	Party	Votes	%
Rufus Rodriguez (incumbent)	Centrist Democratic Party	128,134	84.58
Irene Floro	People's Reform Party	23,365	15.42
Total		151,499	100.00
Total votes		165,781	–
Registered voters/turnout		195,130	84.96
CDP hold			
Source: Commission on Elections

== Camiguin ==
Term-limited incumbent Xavier Jesus Romualdo of PDP–Laban ran for governor of Camiguin.

PDP–Laban nominated Romualdo's father, Camiguin governor Jurdin Jesus Romualdo, who won the election against two other candidates.

Candidate	Party	Votes	%
Jurdin Jesus Romualdo	PDP–Laban	33,079	61.78
Homer Mabale	Independent	16,757	31.30
Momot Ebcas	Independent	3,703	6.92
Total		53,539	100.00
Total votes		55,153	–
Registered voters/turnout		64,090	86.06
PDP–Laban hold			
Source: Commission on Elections

== Iligan ==
Incumbent Frederick Siao of the Nacionalista Party retired to run for mayor of Iligan.

Siao endorsed former representative Vicente Belmonte Jr. of the National Unity Party, who was defeated by Iligan mayor Celso Regencia of PDP–Laban.

Candidate	Party	Votes	%
Celso Regencia	PDP–Laban	75,426	51.77
Vicente Belmonte Jr.	National Unity Party	70,272	48.23
Total		145,698	100.00
Total votes		154,734	–
Registered voters/turnout		185,452	83.44
PDP–Laban gain from Nacionalista			
Source: Commission on Elections

== Lanao del Norte ==
=== 1st district ===
Incumbent Mohamad Khalid Dimaporo of PDP–Laban ran for a third term.

Dimaporo won re-election against Joe Abbas (Partido Federal ng Pilipinas).

Candidate	Party	Votes	%
Mohamad Khalid Dimaporo (incumbent)	PDP–Laban	108,498	87.87
Joe Abbas	Partido Federal ng Pilipinas	14,977	12.13
Total		123,475	100.00
Total votes		144,783	–
Registered voters/turnout		180,628	80.16
PDP–Laban hold			
Source: Commission on Elections

=== 2nd district ===
Incumbent Abdullah Dimaporo of the Nationalist People's Coalition (NPC) was term-limited.

The NPC nominated Dimaporo's daughter, Aminah Dimaporo, who won the election against Jose Patalinghug Jr. (Partido Federal ng Pilipinas).

Candidate	Party	Votes	%
Aminah Dimaporo	Lakas–CMD	138,910	91.14
Jose Patalinghug Jr.	Partido Federal ng Pilipinas	13,501	8.86
Total		152,411	100.00
Total votes		174,959	–
Registered voters/turnout		210,936	82.94
Lakas gain from NPC			
Source: Commission on Elections

== Misamis Occidental ==
=== 1st district ===
Incumbent Diego Ty of the National Unity Party ran for a second term.

Ty was defeated by former Oroquieta mayor Jason Almonte of PDP–Laban. Reynold Yap (Partido Federal ng Pilipinas) also ran for representative.

Candidate	Party	Votes	%
Jason Almonte	PDP–Laban	93,732	58.33
Diego Ty (incumbent)	National Unity Party	66,241	41.22
Reynold Yap	Partido Federal ng Pilipinas	710	0.44
Total		160,683	100.00
Total votes		169,444	–
Registered voters/turnout		202,347	83.74
PDP–Laban gain from NUP			
Source: Commission on Elections

=== 2nd district ===
Term-limited incumbent Henry Oaminal of the Nacionalista Party ran for governor of Misamis Occidental.

The Nacionalista Party nominated Oaminal's son, Ozamiz mayor Ando Oaminal, who won the election against Tangub mayor Jenny Tan (Laban ng Demokratikong Pilipino) and Rondy Conol-Jimenez (Partido Federal ng Pilipinas).

Candidate	Party	Votes	%
Ando Oaminal	Nacionalista Party	143,250	76.11
Jenny Tan	Laban ng Demokratikong Pilipino	44,077	23.42
Rondy Conol-Jimenez	Partido Federal ng Pilipinas	879	0.47
Total		188,206	100.00
Total votes		200,627	–
Registered voters/turnout		232,485	86.30
Nacionalista hold			
Source: Commission on Elections

== Misamis Oriental ==
=== 1st district ===
Incumbent Christian Unabia of Lakas–CMD ran for a second term.

Unabia won re-election against Karen Lagbas (National Unity Party) and provincial board member Jerry Khu (Katipunan ng Nagkakaisang Pilipino).

Candidate	Party	Votes	%
Christian Unabia (incumbent)	Lakas–CMD	114,936	51.04
Karen Lagbas	National Unity Party	105,875	47.02
Jerry Khu	Katipunan ng Nagkakaisang Pilipino	4,370	1.94
Total		225,181	100.00
Total votes		252,300	–
Registered voters/turnout		289,032	87.29
Lakas hold			
Source: Commission on Elections

=== 2nd district ===
Term-limited incumbent Juliette Uy of the National Unity Party (NUP) ran for governor of Misamis Oriental.

The NUP nominated Uy's husband, former Misamis Oriental vice governor Julio Uy, who was defeated by Misamis Oriental governor Yevgeny Emano of Padayon Pilipino. Mylene Mehila (Independent) also ran for representative.

Candidate	Party	Votes	%
Yevgeny Emano	Padayon Pilipino	166,374	56.31
Julio Uy	National Unity Party	127,292	43.08
Mylene Mehila	Independent	1,794	0.61
Total		295,460	100.00
Total votes		332,881	–
Registered voters/turnout		378,384	87.97
Padayon Pilipino gain from NUP			
Source: Commission on Elections
