= 2025 Philippine House of Representatives elections in Northern Mindanao =

- May 12, 2025
- All 14 Northern Mindanao seats in the House of Representatives
Party	Seats	+/–
Lakas	7	+5
Nacionalista	3	0
PFP	2	+2
NUP	1	+1
CDP	1	0
This lists parties that won seats. See the complete results below.

The 2025 Philippine House of Representatives elections in Northern Mindanao were held on May 12, 2025, as part of the 2025 Philippine general election.

== Summary ==
Congressional district	Incumbent	Incumbent's party	Winner	Winner's party	Winning margin
Bukidnon–1st	Jose Manuel Alba	Lakas	Jose Manuel Alba	Lakas	15.42%
Bukidnon–2nd	Jonathan Keith Flores	Lakas	Jonathan Keith Flores	Lakas	66.94%
Bukidnon–3rd	Jose Maria Zubiri Jr.	PFP	Audrey Zubiri	PFP	88.48%
Bukidnon–4th	Laarni Roque	Nacionalista	Laarni Roque	Nacionalista	7.31%
Cagayan de Oro–1st	Lordan Suan	Lakas	Lordan Suan	Lakas	1.98%
Cagayan de Oro–2nd	Rufus Rodriguez	CDP	Rufus Rodriguez	CDP	89.08%
Camiguin	Jurdin Jesus Romualdo	Lakas	Jurdin Jesus Romualdo	Lakas	33.82%
Iligan	Celso Regencia	Lakas	Celso Regencia	Lakas	10.50%
Lanao del Norte–1st	Mohamad Khalid Dimaporo	Lakas	Imelda Dimaporo	PFP	73.16%
Lanao del Norte–2nd	Aminah Dimaporo	Lakas	Aminah Dimaporo	Lakas	78.20%
Misamis Occidental–1st	Jason Almonte	Nacionalista	Jason Almonte	Nacionalista	62.16%
Misamis Occidental–2nd	Ando Oaminal	Lakas	Ando Oaminal	Lakas	86.70%
Misamis Oriental–1st	Christian Unabia	Lakas	Karen Lagbas	NUP	10.98%
Misamis Oriental–2nd	Yevgeny Emano	Nacionalista	Yevgeny Emano	Nacionalista	80.80%

== Bukidnon ==
=== 1st district ===
Incumbent Jose Manuel Alba of Lakas–CMD ran for a second term. He was previously affiliated with Bukidnon Paglaum.

Alba won re-election against Jose Earl Navarro (Partido Federal ng Pilipinas) and former Presidential Adviser for Environmental Protection Nereus Acosta (Independent).

Candidate	Party	Votes	%
Jose Manuel Alba (incumbent)	Lakas–CMD	101,011	55.25
Jose Earl Navarro	Partido Federal ng Pilipinas	72,819	39.83
Nereus Acosta	Independent	8,988	4.92
Total		182,818	100.00
Valid votes		182,818	93.30
Invalid/blank votes		13,137	6.70
Total votes		195,955	100.00
Registered voters/turnout		217,275	90.19
Lakas hold			
Source: Commission on Elections

=== 2nd district ===
Incumbent Jonathan Keith Flores of Lakas–CMD ran for a third term. He was previously affiliated with the Nacionalista Party.

Flores won re-election against Bernardo Mendoza (Independent).

Candidate	Party	Votes	%
Jonathan Keith Flores (incumbent)	Lakas–CMD	158,115	83.47
Bernardo Mendoza	Independent	31,313	16.53
Total		189,428	100.00
Valid votes		189,428	83.41
Invalid/blank votes		37,674	16.59
Total votes		227,102	100.00
Registered voters/turnout		267,163	85.01
Lakas hold			
Source: Commission on Elections

=== 3rd district ===
Incumbent Jose Maria Zubiri Jr. of the Partido Federal ng Pilipinas (PFP) retired. He was previously affiliated with Bukidnon Paglaum.

The PFP nominated Zubiri's daughter-in-law, Audrey Zubiri, who won the election against two other candidates.

Candidate	Party	Votes	%
Audrey Zubiri	Partido Federal ng Pilipinas	225,970	93.88
Jay Areja	Aksyon Demokratiko	12,987	5.40
Jomer Valledor III	Independent	1,755	0.73
Total		240,712	100.00
Valid votes		240,712	90.77
Invalid/blank votes		24,464	9.23
Total votes		265,176	100.00
Registered voters/turnout		311,057	85.25
PFP hold			
Source: Commission on Elections

=== 4th district ===
Incumbent Laarni Roque of the Nacionalista Party ran for a second term..

Roque won re-election against two other candidates.

Candidate	Party	Votes	%
Laarni Roque (incumbent)	Nacionalista Party	76,663	52.23
Dan Dangallo	Independent	65,940	44.92
Jenson Pamisa	Independent	4,190	2.85
Total		146,793	100.00
Valid votes		146,793	84.61
Invalid/blank votes		26,706	15.39
Total votes		173,499	100.00
Registered voters/turnout		200,241	86.65
Nacionalista hold			
Source: Commission on Elections

== Cagayan de Oro ==
=== 1st district ===
Incumbent Lordan Suan of Lakas–CMD ran for a second term. He was previously affiliated with Padayon Pilipino.

Suan won re-election against Barangay Carmen chairman Kikang Uy.

Candidate	Party	Votes	%
Lordan Suan (incumbent)	Lakas–CMD	88,526	50.99
Kikang Uy	Aksyon Demokratiko	85,099	49.01
Total		173,625	100.00
Valid votes		173,625	94.08
Invalid/blank votes		10,930	5.92
Total votes		184,555	100.00
Registered voters/turnout		211,679	87.19
Lakas hold			
Source: Commission on Elections

=== 2nd district ===
Incumbent Rufus Rodriguez of the Centrist Democratic Party ran for a third term.

Rodriguez won re-election against Bebs Morales (Independent).

Candidate	Party	Votes	%
Rufus Rodriguez (incumbent)	Centrist Democratic Party	127,646	94.54
Bebs Morales	Independent	7,369	5.46
Total		135,015	100.00
Valid votes		135,015	81.02
Invalid/blank votes		31,625	18.98
Total votes		166,640	100.00
Registered voters/turnout		203,016	82.08
CDP hold			
Source: Commission on Elections

== Camiguin ==
Incumbent Jurdin Jesus Romualdo of Lakas–CMD ran for a second term. He was previously affiliated with PDP–Laban.

Romualdo won re-election against Paul Rodriguez (Independent).

Candidate	Party	Votes	%
Jurdin Jesus Romualdo (incumbent)	Lakas–CMD	39,864	66.91
Paul Rodriguez	Independent	19,717	33.09
Total		59,581	100.00
Valid votes		59,581	98.82
Invalid/blank votes		713	1.18
Total votes		60,294	100.00
Registered voters/turnout		66,557	90.59
Lakas hold			
Source: Commission on Elections

== Iligan ==
Incumbent Celso Regencia of Lakas–CMD ran for a second term. He was previously affiliated with PDP–Laban with 51.77% of the vote.

Regencia won re-election against Oscar Badelles (Nacionalista Party), former Police Regional Office Bangsamoro Autonomous Region director Graciano Mijares (National Unity Party), Emmanuel Salibay (Independent) and former Iligan police director Seigred Espina (Independent).

Candidate	Party	Votes	%
Celso Regencia (incumbent)	Lakas–CMD	74,818	49.34
Oscar Badelles	Nacionalista Party	58,895	38.84
Graciano Mijares	National Unity Party	11,447	7.55
Emmanuel Salibay	Independent	5,747	3.79
Seigred Espina	Independent	745	0.49
Total		151,652	100.00
Valid votes		151,652	94.12
Invalid/blank votes		9,481	5.88
Total votes		161,133	100.00
Registered voters/turnout		189,050	85.23
Lakas hold			
Source: Commission on Elections

== Lanao del Norte ==
=== 1st district ===
Term-limited incumbent Mohamad Khalid Dimaporo of Lakas–CMD ran for governor of Lanao del Norte. He was previously affiliated with PDP–Laban.

Dimaporo endorsed his mother, Lanao del Norte governor Imelda Dimaporo (Partido Federal ng Pilipinas), who won the election against Joe Abbas (United Nationalist Alliance).

Candidate	Party	Votes	%
Imelda Dimaporo	Partido Federal ng Pilipinas	111,639	86.58
Joe Abbas	United Nationalist Alliance	17,311	13.42
Total		128,950	100.00
Valid votes		128,950	88.60
Invalid/blank votes		16,593	11.40
Total votes		145,543	100.00
Registered voters/turnout		177,487	82.00
PFP hold			
Source: Commission on Elections

=== 2nd district ===
Incumbent Aminah Dimaporo of Lakas–CMD ran for a second term.

Dimaporo won re-election against Nagamura Moner (United Nationalist Alliance).

Candidate	Party	Votes	%
Aminah Dimaporo (incumbent)	Lakas–CMD	142,181	89.10
Nagamura Moner	United Nationalist Alliance	17,387	10.90
Total		159,568	100.00
Valid votes		159,568	89.31
Invalid/blank votes		19,107	10.69
Total votes		178,675	100.00
Registered voters/turnout		206,724	86.43
Lakas hold			
Source: Commission on Elections

== Misamis Occidental ==
=== 1st district ===
Incumbent Jason Almonte of the Nacionalista Party ran for a second term. He was previously affiliated with PDP–Laban.

Almonte won re-election against former Sapang Dalaga mayor Roy Yap (National Unity Party).

Candidate	Party	Votes	%
Jason Almonte (incumbent)	Nacionalista Party	122,329	81.08
Roy Yap	National Unity Party	28,542	18.92
Total		150,871	100.00
Valid votes		150,871	91.81
Invalid/blank votes		13,463	8.19
Total votes		164,334	100.00
Registered voters/turnout		200,224	82.08
Nacionalista hold			
Source: Commission on Elections

=== 2nd district ===
Incumbent Ando Oaminal of Lakas–CMD ran for a second term. He was previously affiliated with the Nacionalista Party.

Oaminal won re-election against former Don Victoriano mayor Rudy Luna (National Unity Party).

Candidate	Party	Votes	%
Ando Oaminal (incumbent)	Lakas–CMD	176,532	93.35
Rudy Luna	National Unity Party	12,584	6.65
Total		189,116	100.00
Valid votes		189,116	94.07
Invalid/blank votes		11,931	5.93
Total votes		201,047	100.00
Registered voters/turnout		237,177	84.77
Lakas hold			
Source: Commission on Elections

== Misamis Oriental ==
=== 1st district ===
Incumbent Christian Unabia of Lakas–CMD ran for a third term.

Unabia was defeated by Karen Lagbas of the National Unity Party.

Candidate	Party	Votes	%
Karen Lagbas	National Unity Party	140,549	55.49
Christian Unabia (incumbent)	Lakas–CMD	112,758	44.51
Total		253,307	100.00
Valid votes		253,307	95.17
Invalid/blank votes		12,846	4.83
Total votes		266,153	100.00
Registered voters/turnout		300,911	88.45
NUP gain from Lakas			
Source: Commission on Elections

=== 2nd district ===
Incumbent Yevgeny Emano of the Nacionalista Party ran for a second term. He was previously affiliated with Padayon Pilipino.

Emano won re-election against Manuel Po (Independent).

Candidate	Party	Votes	%
Yevgeny Emano (incumbent)	Nacionalista Party	241,177	90.40
Manuel Po	Independent	25,608	9.60
Total		266,785	100.00
Valid votes		266,785	78.19
Invalid/blank votes		74,408	21.81
Total votes		341,193	100.00
Registered voters/turnout		390,691	87.33
Nacionalista hold			
Source: Commission on Elections
