= Baungon =

Municipality in Bukidnon, Philippines

- Municipality
- Municipality of Baungon
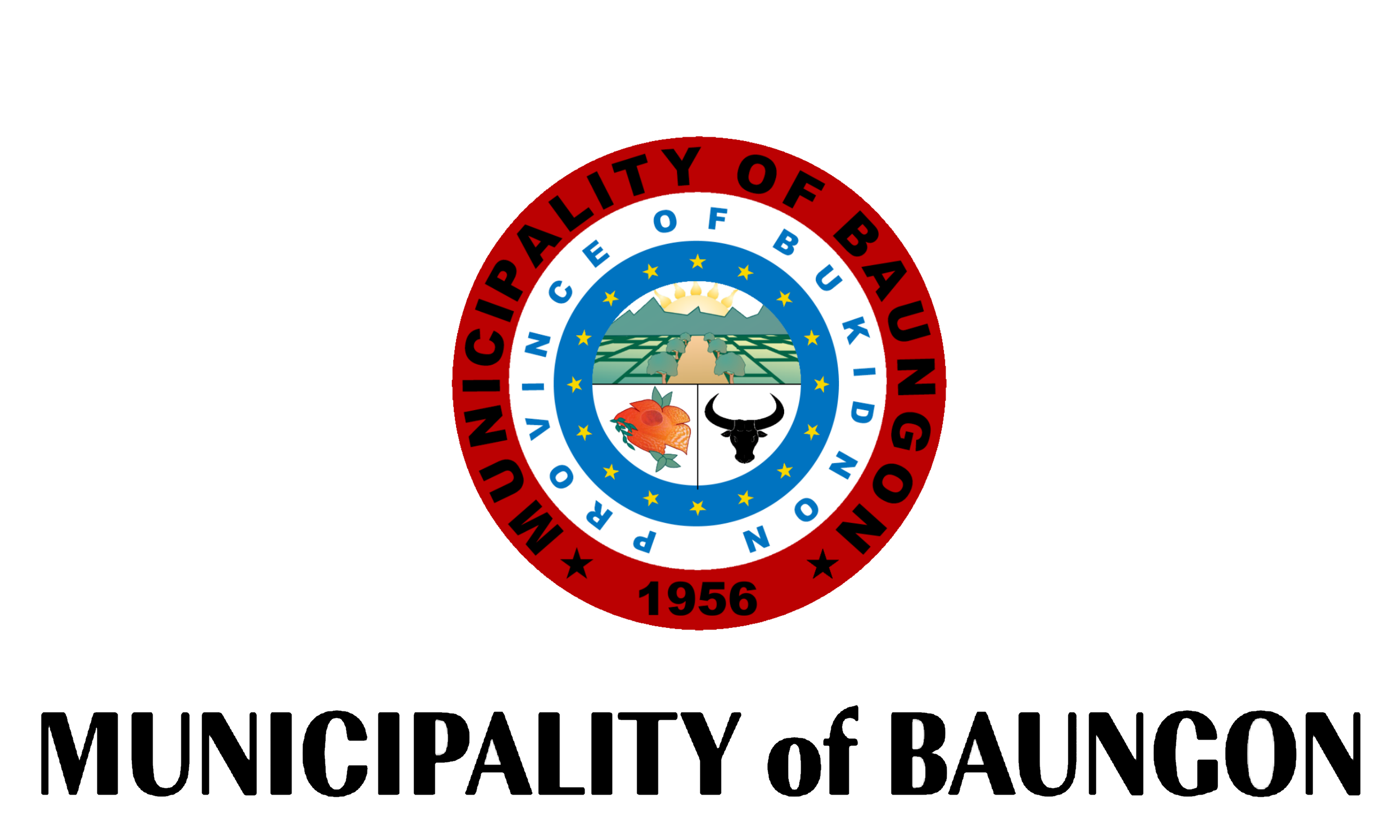
- Flag Seal

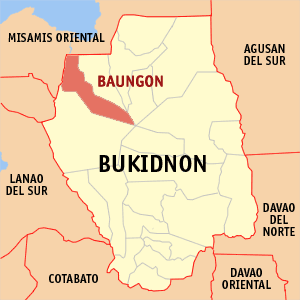
- Map of Bukidnon with Baungon highlighted
- Interactive map of Baungon
- Location within the Philippines
- Coordinates: 8°18′46″N 124°41′14″E
- Country: Philippines
- Region: Northern Mindanao
- Province: Bukidnon
- District: 1st district
- Barangays: 16 (see Barangays)

Government
  - Type: Sangguniang Bayan
  - Mayor: Rogelio D. Jaraula
  - Vice Mayor: Joseph Bajuyo
  - Representative: Joeman Alba
  - Municipal Council: Members: Pedro Alvarez; Jedyl Jamaca; Goldie Mae Q. Ravidas; Mary Joy Verzo; Albert Montenegro; Paolo Beja; Gelbes Vergara; Russel Vergara
  - Electorate: 28,419 voters (2025)

Area
  - Total: 328.34 km^{2} (126.77 sq mi)
- Elevation: 416 m (1,365 ft)
- Highest elevation: 723 m (2,372 ft)
- Lowest elevation: 156 m (512 ft)

Population (2024 census)
  - Total: 39,151
  - Density: 119.24/km^{2} (308.83/sq mi)
  - Households: 8,927

Economy
  - Income class: 1st municipal income class
  - Poverty incidence: 28.26% (2023)
  - Revenue: ₱ 252.1 million (2024)
  - Assets: ₱ 754.1 million (2024)
  - Expenditure: ₱ 238.3 million (2024)
  - Liabilities: ₱ 190.1 million (2024)

Service provider
  - Electricity: Bukidnon 2 Electric Cooperative (BUSECO)
- Time zone: UTC+8 (PST)
- ZIP code: 8707
- PSGC: 1001301000
- IDD : area code: +63 (0)88
- Native languages: Binukid; Cebuano; Ata Manobo; Tagalog
- Website: www.baungonbuk.gov.ph

Baungon, officially the Municipality of Baungon (Bukid and Higaonon: Banuwa ta Baungon; Cebuano: Lungsod sa Baungon; Tagalog: Bayan ng Baungon), is a municipality in the province of Bukidnon, Philippines. According to the 2024 census, it has a population of 39,151 people.

== History ==
Baungon was converted from a municipal district to a municipality through Executive Order No. 272 signed by President Carlos P. Garcia on October 4, 1957; the conversion took effect on July 1, 1956.

=== Tribal History ===
1757 - Apo Amay Mandapagun arrived from Lambaguhon, Kagayha-an (Cagayan de Oro City today) and resided in Buenavista. Apo Amay Mandapagun’s brothers and sisters came along with him, they were: Apo Inay Quirenaw, Apo Amay Man-utok, Apo Amay Malughod and Apo Inay Linda Dialangan.

Apo Amay Mandapagun is the father of Apo Amay Dapagun. Apo Amay Dapagun is the father of Apo Amay Matulis. Apo Amay Matulis' children are:

1. Apo Amay Tolis
2. Apo Amay Tomas Lilangan
3. Apo Amay Mandintuhan
4. Apo Amay Ilumon
5. Apo Inay Botis
6. Apo Inay Miayana
7. Apo Inay Musal
8. Apo Amay Sungkayaw
9. Apo Inay Laum
10. Apo Amay Mateo Hukmayan

1902 - Old Imbatug was founded.

1918 - an epidemic swept many lives in Old Imbatug

Due to this epidemic, the residents decided to cross back Cagayan river, some hid in the mountains. Those who decided to stay chose Apo Amay Manlibanda as their leader. He called a meeting and proposed that they leave old Imbatug and transfer to Brgy. Imbatug which eventually became the Poblacion.

On their way to Brgy. Imbatug, they stopped at a stream "Pandaug" (Pandahug today) and performed Panlitub - a ritual to drive away the evil spirits symbolizing the epidemic. "Daug" is Victory thus, Pandaug is named to commemorate their victory over the sickness. The land adjacent to the river they named "Mando". "Mando" is “TO COMMAND" from the Latin word, "Mandatum". This symbolized their command over the evil spirits to leave them in peace.

In those days, there were two Mando: Upper and Lower. Apo Amay Mansumina Lilo lived in lower Mando, the part across the mando river near the cemetery now. Upper Mando was the place under the direction of Apo Amay Simbo. The chapel standing now in Mando was constructed by Apo Amay Simbo.

May 6, 1920 - New Poblacion, Imbatug at present is founded

Apo Amay Tomas Lilangan became the first Datu that ruled the New Poblacion. His offspring are:

1. Maria Lilangan (Apo Inay Bawe was married first to Amay Malaque of Talakag, but Apo Amay Tomas was not happy with the marriage “GI-BAWE SIYA” thus, she came to be known as Apo Inay Bawe. The second husband of Apo Inay Bawe was Marcos Layawan.)
2. Rosita Lilangan Malinawon (Apo Inay Damit)
3. Juliana Lilangan Oblad (Apo Inay Ombad)
4. Cepriano Lilangan (Apo Amay Simbo)

Apo Amay Tomas Lilangan adopted:

1. Apo Amay Melicio
2. Apo Amay Fortun

Apo Amay Tomas Lilangan married a second wife with the children:

1. Apo Amay Sotero
2. Apo Amay Anselmo

1940's the Jesuits came to do Missionary work in Baungon. Apo Amay Simbo (CEPRIANO I) built a Chapel in Mando. It was said that in a dream, Apo Amay Simbo saw an old woman emerged out of the river (Mando). This old woman identified herself as Fatima instructed Apo Amay Simbo to construct a Chapel and to prepare his family to receive baptism from the Catholic missionaries that would come. The next day, the missionaries arrived and Apo Amay Simbo had his children baptized to Christian faith.

Many members of the tribe converted to Christianity. Soon, the Jesuit missionaries would start a Parish in Baungon. Since he had three wives, the Jesuits advised him to select only one in conformity with the Christian tradition of monogamy. He chose the second, Apo Inay Apay Laque. Apo Inay Apay had four children from Apo Amay Simbo. These are:

1. Rufino Laque Lilangan who married Natividad Pabillaran
2. Felomina Laque Lilangan married Timoteo Bacarro
3. Leonora (Odeng) Laque Lilangan married Castor Cadete
4. Petronila Laque Lilangan married Alfonso Jaranilla

Rufino Laque Lilangan and Natividad Pabillaran children are:

1. Norma Pabillaran Lilangan
2. Dulcenia Pabillaran Lilangan married Olympio Rapirap
3. Agustin Pabillaran Lilangan married Belen Cabenta and upon the Death of the first wife married Charito Tenestrante
4. Roqueza Pabillaran Lilangan married Julius Sumile, Sr.
5. Mercy Pabillaran Lilangan married Cocoy Rapirap
6. Clotilda Pabillaran Lilangan married Eleuterio Mesiona
7. Emerita Pabillaran Lilangan

Felomina Laque Lilangan and Timoteo Bacarro children are:

1. Evina who married Apolinario Bacarro
2. Irving Lilangan Bacarro married Victoria Balinas
3. Vilma Lilangan Bacarro who married Nemesio Sinayran
4. Nyoyen Lilangan Bacarro married Navarro
5. Arceli Lilangan Bacarro
6. Henedina Lilangan Bacarro married Rudolfo Amoguis
7. Phoebe Lilangan Bacarro married Rolly Libanta
8. Concepcion Lilangan Bacarro married Juny Buna
9. Glory Lilangan Bacarro who married Embate
10. Godie Lilangan Bacarro
11. The twin Reymar and Ramir
12. Mardy Lilangan Bacarro who married Erwel Asuncion

Leonora (Odeng) Laque Lilangan and Castor Cadete Sr. children are:

1. Pedro (Boy) Lilangan Cadete married to Linda Pastolero
2. Manuel (Nonoy) Lilangan Cadete married Elena Magbanua
3. Violeta (Tita) Lilangan Cadete married Roger Saludades
4. Ma. Fe (Chari) Lilangan Cadete married Johnny Juanito
5. Mansueto (Botoy) Lilangan Cadete
6. Castor Lilangan Cadete Jr. married Jing Garcia
7. Mary Cheryl (Pinky) Lilangan Cadete married to Fernando Alday

Petronila Laque Lilangan and Alfonso Jaranilla children are:

1. Wildon Lilangan Jaranilla married Girlie Gamay
2. Leticia Lilangan Jaranilla married Villanueva
3. Teresita Lilangan Jaranilla married Anecito Capin
4. Rosemarie Lilangan Jaranilla married Raul Molinas
5. Adjutor Lilangan Jaranilla married Myrna Aranggo
6. Jimmy Lilangan Jaranilla married Minda
7. Milagros Lilangan Jaranilla married Dante Mabaylan
8. Joseph Lilangan Jaranilla
9. Rafael Lilangan Jaranilla married Merlene Dacan
10. Michael Lilangan Jaranilla
11. Roger Lilangan Jaranilla
12. Andrew Lilangan Jaranilla
13. Lucia Lilangan Jaranilla

Apo Inay Juliana (Inay Ombad) married Pedro Oblad. Their children are:

1. Abello
2. Francisco
3. Carmen
4. Teodoro
5. Pedro
6. Florida

The children of Apo Inay Rosita Lilangan who married a Malinawon are:

1. Joaquin
2. Anong
3. Kaki

(Important Note: Apo Amay Simbo also adopted the son of his sister Apo Inay Bawe. Adopted was his niece, Patricio Layawan, which later on kept the maiden name of his mother, thus he became known as Patricio Lilangan.)

Patricio Lilangan married Esperanza Nagac. Their children are:

1. Erma Nagac Lilangan married Hermetanio Lunaan
2. Erwina Nagac Lilangan married Watson
3. Ray Lilangan married Teresita Son
4. Paz Nagac Lilangan married Felicisimo Lozano Rosaciña
5. Alta Rita Nagac Lilangan married Rodolfo Lido Waban, Sr
6. Gemma Nagac Lilangan married Robert Corbin
7. Perla Nagac Lilangan married Apolinar Mangcawan Rara
8. Necthom Nagac Lilangan married Profetieza Tulop
9. Cepriano Nagac Lilangan II married Estelita Ypil Batulan Lilangan
10. Teresita Nagac Lilangan married Rogelio Sabio Lago

The inter-marriage from the tribe of Talakag can be presented this way:

Apo Amay Kalinaw Sampalay, a prominent family of Talakag was the father of:

1. Apo Amay Lantungan
2. Apo Amay Man Aransel (who became the first husband of Apo Inay Bawe), and
3. Apo Amay Salicobay.

Apo Amay Man Aransel Sampalay and Apo Inay Maria (Inay Bawe) had a son with the name of Juanito Sampalay. Juanito Sampalay was the father of Apo Inay Remedios (Mending) Sampalay who later on married Meling Catubo.

The second husband of Apo Inay Maria (Inay Bawe) was Marcos Layawan. Marcos Layawan had a first wife with 2 children:

1. Eusebio Layawan
2. A sister who married Juan Caler

Marcos Layawan and Apo Inay Bawe had two offspring:

1. Patricio Layawan (later on Lilangan). Patricio was adopted by Apo Amay Simbo.
2. Bernabe Layawan.

On the other hand, Apo Amay Salicobay married Carmen Bisang and they bore a son with the name Simeon Salicobay. Simeon married Martina Man-inotao and their children are:

1. Violeta Iway
2. Felomina Pacana
3. Anastacia Salicobay
4. Sonny Boy Salicobay

Derivatives of Imbatug (Town Proper)

Imba - Why Tuga - Gifted, Given Tugà - to flow in steady stream

Imbatug - Why are we gifted with flowing stream?

We are gifted with a gift of Faith

COMMUNING WITH THE SPIRITS

Even before Christianity arrived in Baungon, the elders already commune with the Spirit World. When sickness visited them, they would consult the spirits of the earth, the air, the balete tree, the forests, the river and all elements that have to do with nature. For example, Mansumina Lilo and Apo Simbo are called when children of the tribe suffer from ailments. They would consult their spear (bangkaw) and let it identify the spirits hurt by the child who is ill. They called this process “Bala-on” (Stopping the spirits from doing further damage). This is done by stretching both arms between the spear. It is said that if they identify the spirit who is giving suffering to the child, the spear can be arm stretched from tip to tip. If the fingers will not reach the two tips of the spear then the spirits are not yet identified. When the spirits are identified, for instance, the spirit of balete tree allows itself be identified as the cause of ailment, only then will they look for herbal medicines appropriate for those hounded by the spirits and cure will come to the ailing child.

ANIMISM THE OLD WAY OF HIGAONONS

Animism ruled the land before the coming of the Christian Missionaries. Strange to say but they ascribe everything that is going on around them to the spirits that surround the people. When a child drowns, they say he/she was pulled by the spirits of the water. Spirits lurks in places not visited often by people. In fact, they say these spirits did not want to be disturbed that’s why they inflict misery to those who will disturb them.

CHRISTIANIZATION BY THE JESUITS

The first missionaries to arrive in Baungon were the Jesuits (Society of Jesus). They helped a lot in the formation of the different Barrios and Barangays. They would travel to these Barrios riding on the back of horses and by these means converted the locals to Christianity. Much has been done by the Jesuits for it was through their efforts that the formation of barrios and the Christianization of Baungon came about. They should be mentioned with the history of Baungon. The Jesuits who had been assigned to the parish were:

1. 1958-1965 Fr Gregory Horgan
2. 1965-66 Fr Thomas Connolly
3. 1966-74 Fr Eduard Van Groenendael
4. 1974-75 Fr Jose Dacanay
5. 1975-77 Fr Teodoro Urrutia
6. 1977-1980 Fr Joseph Bittner
7. 1980-85 Fr Romeo Serrato
8. 1985-86 Fr Buddy Wee

But we need to take note that before the parish was even founded, the parish of Talakag helped in the missions. Frs. Neri, Dulalas, Martinez and Cebrero were invited to help in the sacramental work of Imbatug. Imbatug was declared a Parish on May 15, 1959. After the Jesuits, 12 filipino secular priests served the parish namely:

- 1986-89 Fr Gonzalo Pimentel
- 1989-92 Fr Danilo Paciente
- 1992-95 Fr Rodulfo Porras
- 1995-2000 Fr Flordelito Nazareno
- 2000-01 Fr Cosme Almedilla (The 3rd Bishop of the Diocese of Butuan as Most Rev. Bishop Cosme Almedilla D.D.)
- 2001-07 Fr Diomedes Brigoli
- 2007-12 Fr Efren Estaniel
- 2011-12 Fr Oscar Gorgonio
- 2012-17 Fr Charlo Maglunsod
- 2017-21 Fr Joel Tuquib

(On April 12, 2021, Fr. Joel Tuquib suddenly died due to the heart attack in Malaybalay, Bukidnon. He was 50 years old at that time. From April 2021 - May 2021 Fr Janrey Zabala served as Parish Administrator.)

- 2021-22 Fr Neil Joy Molion
- 2022-present Fr Richard Carreon

From among the local residents, we have produced 3 women religious: Srs. Wilma Olango, MCJ; Ruth Linaac, RVM; Adie Vallecera, RVM and another three religious missionaries among the men; they are: Fr. Sirenio Jaranilla, O.Carm; Fr. Ransom Rapirap, OCD; and Fr. Ritche Catubo of the Military Diocese.

(Historical Notes by Fr. Sirenio Jaranilla. Additional Historical Account by Datu Pantao [Feliciano Mayake] and Sonny Boy Salicobay.)

(Nota Bene: This historical narrative is focused on CEPRIANO LILANGAN I family tree being the FOUNDER of Imbatug and the Father of the First Mayor of Imbatug, Baungon, Bukidnon, PATRICIO L. LILANGAN)

FOR MORE INFORMATION ABOUT THE GROWTH OF CHRISTIANITY IN BAUNGON, PLEASE CLICK ON THE LINK BELOW:

MISSIONARY DEVELOPMENT OF BAUNGON

——-+++——-

== Geography ==
Baungon is located in the northern part of Bukidnon, about 132 kilometres (82 mi) north of Malaybalay City via Cagayan de Oro, which is about 30 kilometres (19 mi) from Imbatug, the town's poblacion. It is bounded on the north-east by the Libona, at the south by the Lantapan, and on the west by Talakag. It has a land area of 328.34 square kilometres based on the cadastral survey made by the DENR.

=== Climate ===
Typical of the province environmental condition, Baungon belongs to the third type of climate which is relatively dry from March to April and wet from May to December. In 1997, the heaviest rainfall was recorded in January with 497.8 millimetres (19.60 in). April has the lowest amount of rainfall with 24.3 millimetres (0.96 in). The average temperature is 25 °C (77 °F) and the average humidity is 82.2%.

Climate data for Baungon, Bukidnon
Month	Jan	Feb	Mar	Apr	May	Jun	Jul	Aug	Sep	Oct	Nov	Dec	Year
Mean daily maximum °C (°F)	26 (79)	27 (81)	28 (82)	29 (84)	28 (82)	28 (82)	28 (82)	28 (82)	28 (82)	28 (82)	27 (81)	27 (81)	28 (82)
Mean daily minimum °C (°F)	22 (72)	22 (72)	22 (72)	23 (73)	24 (75)	24 (75)	23 (73)	23 (73)	23 (73)	23 (73)	23 (73)	23 (73)	23 (73)
Average precipitation mm (inches)	271 (10.7)	217 (8.5)	193 (7.6)	178 (7.0)	344 (13.5)	423 (16.7)	362 (14.3)	358 (14.1)	329 (13.0)	320 (12.6)	322 (12.7)	260 (10.2)	3,577 (140.9)
Average rainy days	23.2	19.5	22.0	22.8	29.6	28.9	30.3	29.8	28.1	28.8	26.1	24.1	313.2
Source: Meteoblue

=== Topography ===
The bigger part of Baungon is located over plateau, the terrain of which is generally flat with slowly rising mountains and some canyons with a highest slope of 30%. In some parts, however, the terrain is strongly sloping to severely eroded. It has three (3) large rivers, namely; Bobonawan in the north, Tumalaong at the south, and Kalawaig at the west. These rivers and its tributaries serve as natural drainage system.

Near the airport, one can find Kabula River, a favorite site for water rafting.

=== Flora ===
Baungon is home to two of the world's rarest flowers: Rafflesia and Amorphophallus paeoniifolius. The Rafflesia that grows in Baungon was identified by one botanist, Ulysses Ferreras, as Rafflesia schadenbergiana, which was thought to be extinct. Such Rafflesia was last seen by the German Alex Schandenberg on Mount Apo in the year 1881, but found again in Bukidnon after 126 years. This Rafflesia is called by locals as "Kolon Busaw" and grows well in its soil.

=== Barangays ===
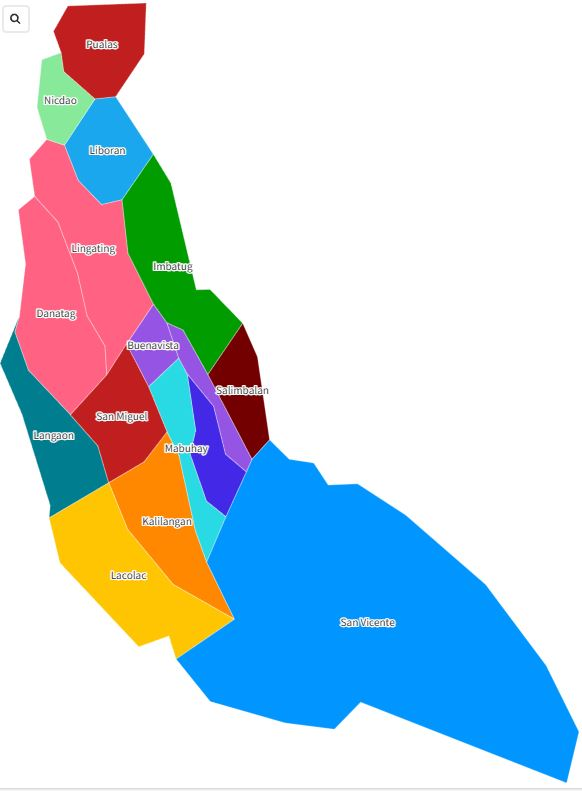
A barangay map of Baungon, Bukidnon

Baungon is politically subdivided into 16 barangays. Each barangay consists of puroks while some have sitios.

PSGC	Barangay	Population			±% p.a.	
		2024		2010		
101301001	Balintad	1.4%	539	660	▾	−1.39%
101301002	Buenavista	2.3%	916	1,072	▾	−1.08%
101301003	Danatag	6.5%	2,561	2,585	▾	−0.06%
101301004	Kalilangan	1.7%	680	883	▾	−1.78%
101301005	Lacolac	1.6%	608	685	▾	−0.82%
101301006	Langaon	2.8%	1,087	1,044	▴	0.28%
101301007	Liboran	8.6%	3,358	3,094	▴	0.57%
101301008	Lingating	10.7%	4,175	4,726	▾	−0.85%
101301009	Mabuhay	3.9%	1,529	1,628	▾	−0.43%
101301010	Mabunga	3.2%	1,272	1,162	▴	0.63%
101301011	Nicdao	5.5%	2,159	1,938	▴	0.75%
101301012	Imbatug (Poblacion)	16.3%	6,363	5,231	▴	1.36%
101301013	Pualas	6.4%	2,524	2,065	▴	1.39%
101301014	Salimbalan	8.1%	3,189	2,915	▴	0.62%
101301015	San Vicente	6.0%	2,344	2,143	▴	0.62%
101301016	San Miguel	2.6%	1,032	1,037	▾	−0.03%
	Total		39,151	32,868	▴	1.21%

== Demographics ==
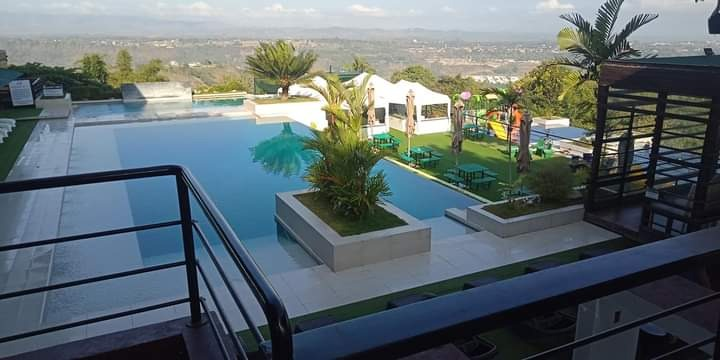
Ultra Winds Mountain Resort located in Barangay Pualas is accessible in Cagayan de Oro via Convention Center Access Road

Population census of Baungon
Year	Pop.	±% p.a.
1918	727	—
1939	2,345	+5.74%
1948	3,927	+5.90%
1960	7,617	+5.68%
1970	11,251	+3.97%
1975	14,974	+5.90%
1980	18,320	+4.11%
1990	19,774	+0.77%
1995	22,617	+2.55%
2000	26,695	+3.62%
2007	29,757	+1.51%
2010	32,868	+3.68%
2015	34,336	+0.84%
2020	37,111	+1.65%
2024	39,151	+1.29%
Source: Philippine Statistics Authority

In the 2024 census, the population of Baungon was 39,151 people, with a density of 120 inhabitants per square kilometre or 310 inhabitants per square mile.

== Economy ==
Poverty incidence of Baungon (%)

Source: Philippine Statistics Authority

The town's economy is primarily agricultural. The main agricultural products of Baungon are corn, casava, banana, camote, fruits and vegetables, bamboo crafts, and abaca products. Mill products consist of the following: corn grits, rice, and casava starch.
