= Misamis Oriental Provincial Board =

Legislative body of the province of Misamis Oriental, Philippines

Misamis Oriental Provincial Board Hunta Probinsyal sa Sidlakang Misamis Hunta Probinsyal ta Misamis Oriental Sangguniang Panlalawigan ng Misamis Oriental

Type
- Type: Unicameral
- Term limits: 3 terms (9 years)

Leadership
- Presiding Officer: Jeremy Pelaez, Lakas-CMD since June 30, 2019

Structure
- Seats: 14 board members 1 ex officio presiding officer
- Political groups: Lakas (5) Padayon (3) NUP (1) Nacionalista (1) TBD (1) Nonpartisan (3)
- Length of term: 3 years
- Authority: Local Government Code of the Philippines

Elections
- Voting system: Multiple non-transferable vote (regular members); Indirect election (ex officio members); Acclamation (sectoral member)
- Last election: May 12, 2025
- Next election: May 15, 2028

Meeting place
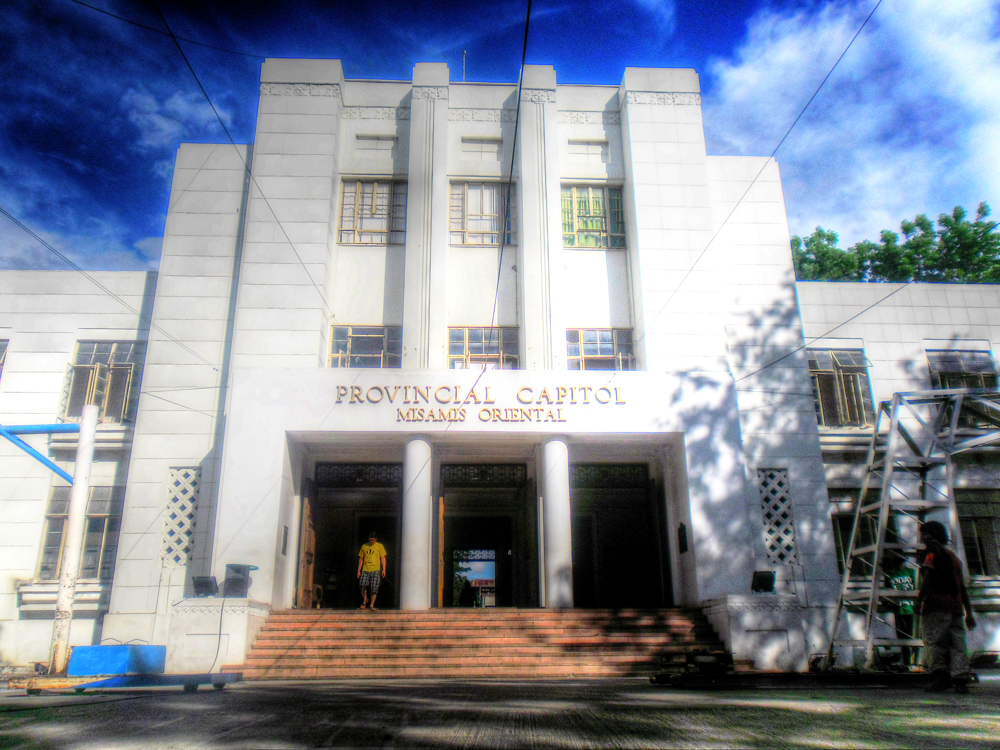
- Misamis Oriental Provincial Capitol, Cagayan de Oro

The Misamis Oriental Provincial Board is the Sangguniang Panlalawigan (provincial legislature) of the Philippine province of Misamis Oriental.

The members are elected via plurality-at-large voting: the province is divided into two districts, each having five seats. A voter votes up to five names, with the top five candidates per district being elected. The vice governor is the ex officio presiding officer, and only votes to break ties. The vice governor is elected via the plurality voting system province-wide.

The districts used in appropriation of members is coextensive with the legislative districts of Misamis Oriental.

Aside from the regular members, the board also includes the provincial federation presidents of the Liga ng mga Barangay (ABC, from its old name "Association of Barangay Captains"), the Sangguniang Kabataan (SK, youth councils) and the Philippine Councilors League (PCL). Misamis Oriental's provincial board also has a reserved seat for its indigenous people (IPMR).

== Apportionment ==
Elections	Seats per district		Ex officio seats	Reserved seats	Total seats
Elections	1st	2nd	Ex officio seats	Reserved seats	Total seats
2010–present	5	5	3	1	14

== List of members ==
=== Current members ===
These are the members after the 2025 local elections and 2023 barangay and SK elections:

- Vice Governor: Jeremy Jonahmar G. Pelaez (Lakas)

Seat	Board member	Party	Start of term	End of term
1st district	Marlon C. Kho	Lakas	June 30, 2022	June 30, 2028
1st district	Rommel C. Maslog	Lakas	June 30, 2025	June 30, 2028
1st district	Rey B. Buhisan	Lakas	June 30, 2022	June 30, 2028
1st district	Jabi I. Bernaldez	Lakas	June 30, 2022	June 30, 2028
1st district	Roy E. Aniscal	Lakas	June 30, 2025	June 30, 2028
2nd district	Syremae N. Emano	Padayon	June 30, 2019	June 30, 2028
2nd district	Dexter B. Yasay	Padayon	June 30, 2019	June 30, 2028
2nd district	Nancy S. Madjos	Padayon	June 30, 2019	June 30, 2028
2nd district	Princess N. Emano	NUP	June 30, 2022	June 30, 2028
2nd district	Bliss Francis J. Acain	Nacionalista	June 30, 2022	June 30, 2028
ABC	Leonard Winstanley	Nonpartisan	July 30, 2018	January 1, 2023
PCL	TBD			June 30, 2028
SK	Mary Kate Temple	Nonpartisan	June 8, 2018	January 1, 2023
IPMR	Alan Mandokita	Nonpartisan	January 14, 2020	January 14, 2023

=== Vice governor ===
Election year	Name	Party	Ref.
2016	Jose Mari G. Pelaez	UNA	
2019	Jeremy Jonahmar G. Pelaez	UNA	
2022	Jeremy Jonahmar G. Pelaez	PADAYN	
2025	Jeremy Jonahmar G. Pelaez	Lakas	

=== 1st district ===
- Population (2024):

Election year	Member (party)	Member (party)	Member (party)	Member (party)	Member (party)	Ref.
2016	Wayne T. Militante (Liberal)	Virgelia F. Dumadag (Liberal)	Fredrick Y. Khu (Liberal)	Vincent K. Pelaez (Liberal)	Jeremy Jonahmar G. Pelaez (Padayon)	
2019	Wayne T. Militante (Padayon)	Virgelia F. Dumadag (PDP–Laban)	Fredrick Y. Khu (PDP–Laban)	Vincent K. Pelaez (PDP–Laban)	Jerry V. Khu (Liberal)	
2022	Wayne T. Militante (Padayon)	Marlon C. Kho (Lakas)	Fredrick Y. Khu (Lakas)	Rey B. Buhisan (Lakas)	Jabi I. Bernaldez (NUP)	
2025	Rommel C. Maslog (Lakas)	Marlon C. Kho (Lakas)	Rommel C. Maslog (Lakas)	Rey B. Buhisan (Lakas)	Jabi I. Bernaldez (Lakas)	

=== 2nd district ===
- Population (2024):

Election year	Member (party)	Member (party)	Member (party)	Member (party)	Member (party)	Ref.
2016	Mercy Grace J. Acain (Padayon)	Mario K. Emano (Padayon)	Nancy S. Madjos (Padayon)	Gerardo P. Sabal, III (Padayon)	Boris Olivier H. Actub (NUP)	
2019	Syremae N. Emano (Padayon)	Dexter B. Yasay (Padayon)	Nancy S. Madjos (Padayon)	Gerardo P. Sabal, III (Padayon)	Jessa Josephine B. Mugot (NUP)	
2022	Syremae N. Emano (Padayon)	Dexter B. Yasay (Padayon)	Princess N. Emano (NUP)	Gerardo P. Sabal, III (Padayon)	Bliss Francis J. Acain (NUP)	
2025	Syremae N. Emano (Padayon)	Dexter B. Yasay (Padayon)	Princess N. Emano (NUP)	Nancy S. Madjos (Padayon)	Bliss Francis J. Acain (Natcionalista)	
