= Lordan Suan =

Filipino lawyer and politician (born 1983)

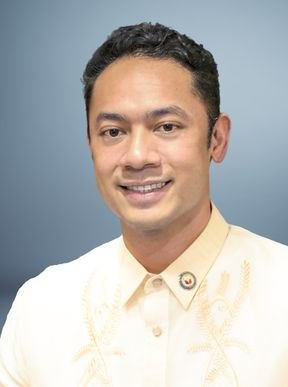
- Official portrait, 2025

Member of Philippine House of Representatives from Cagayan de Oro's 1st district
- Incumbent
- Assumed office June 30, 2022
- Preceded by: Rolando Uy

Member of the Cagayan de Oro City Council from the 1st district
- In office June 30, 2016 – June 30, 2022

Personal details
- Born: July 22, 1983 (age 43) Cagayan de Oro, Philippines
- Party: PFP (2026–present); PADAYN (local party; 2018–present)
- Other political affiliations: Lakas (2023–2026) Nacionalista (2018–2023); UNA (2015–2018)

Lordan Gualberto Suan is a Filipino lawyer and politician serving as the representative for Cagayan de Oro's first district since 2022. He is affiliated with the Partido Federal ng Pilipinas (PFP) and the local party Padayon Pilipino (PADAYN).

== Early life and education ==
Suan was born on July 22, 1983 in Cagayan de Oro, Misamis Oriental. He completed his Juris Doctor degree at Xavier University – Ateneo de Cagayan. Before entering politics, he worked as a lawyer, providing legal services focused on the needs of individuals and local communities.

== Political career ==
=== Cagayan de Oro City Council ===
Suan entered public office in 2016 when he was elected to the Cagayan de Oro City Council. During his time as a councilor, he worked on programs related to education, infrastructure, and social services, with an emphasis on scholarships and youth support.

=== House of Representatives ===
In 2022, Suan was elected to the House of Representatives, representing Cagayan de Oro's first district. In the 19th Congress, he served as vice chairperson of the Committee on Social Services and the Committee on Micro, Small, and Medium Enterprise Development.

Suan has participated in legislative efforts on issues such as disaster preparedness, food security, education, healthcare, and environmental protection. Among the measures he authored is House Bill No. 9457, the "Anti-Education Extortion Act", which seeks to stop public schools from denying enrollment or withholding student records due to unpaid fees.

In 2024, Suan hosted the Bagong Pilipinas Serbisyo Fair in Cagayan de Oro City, facilitating the delivery of various government services to constituents.

=== Legislative work ===
In June 2024, Suan was awarded the "Outstanding Public Servant" Laurel Trophy by RP-Mission and Development Foundation Inc., in recognition of his public service during the Independence Day 2024 celebration.

== Electoral history ==
Electoral history of Lordan Suan
Year	Office	Party		Votes received				Result
Year	Office	Local	National	Total	%	P.	Swing	Result
2016	Councilor (Cagayan de Oro–1st)	—N/a	UNA	49,430	—N/a	2nd	—N/a	Won
2019	Councilor (Cagayan de Oro–1st)	PADAYN	Nacionalista	54,505	—N/a	7th	—N/a	Won
2022	Representative (Cagayan de Oro–1st)	PADAYN	Nacionalista	76,832	54.10%	1st	—N/a	Won
2025	Representative (Cagayan de Oro–1st)	PADAYN	Lakas	88,526	50.99%	1st	—N/a	Won
