= Cagayan de Oro's 1st congressional district =

Congressional district in the Philippines

- Constituency for the House of Representatives of the Philippines
- Map
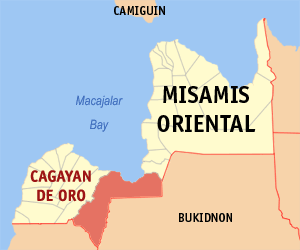
- Location of Cagayan de Oro within Misamis Oriental
- City: Cagayan de Oro
- Region: Northern Mindanao
- Population: 383,945 (2020)
- Electorate: 177,163 (2022)
- Major settlements: 25 barangays: Barangays; Baikingon; Balulang; Bayabas; Bayanga; Besigan; Bonbon; Bulua; Calaanan; Canitoan; Carmen; Dansolihon; Iponan; Kauswagan; Lumbia; Mambuaya; Pagalungan; Pagatpat; Patag; Pigsag-an; San Simon; Taglimao; Tagpangi; Tignapoloan; Tuburan; Tumpagon
- Area: 377.81 km^{2} (145.87 sq mi)

Current constituency
- Created: 2007
- Representative: Lordan Suan
- Political party: PFP; PADAYN
- Congressional bloc: Majority

Cagayan de Oro's 1st congressional district is one of the two congressional districts of the Philippines in Cagayan de Oro. It has been represented in the House of Representatives since 2007. It was created by the 2007 reapportionment that divided the city into two congressional districts and which took effect in the same year. The district is composed of all barangays located west of the Cagayan River and includes the city's southern barangays bordering the mountains of Talakag and Iligan. It is currently represented in the 20th Congress by Lordan Suan of the Partido Federal ng Pilipinas (PFP) and Padayon Pilipino (PADAYN).

== Representation history ==
#	Image	Member	Term of office		Congress	Party	Electoral history	Constituent LGUs
#	Image	Member	Start	End	Congress	Party	Electoral history	Constituent LGUs
=== Cagayan de Oro's 1st district for the House of Representatives of the Philippines ===
District created February 22, 2007 from Cagayan de Oro's at-large district.
1		Rolando Uy	June 30, 2007	June 30, 2010	14th	Nacionalista	Elected in 2007.	2007–present Baikingon, Balulang, Bayabas, Bayanga, Besigan, Bonbon, Bulua, Calaanan, Canitoan, Carmen, Dansolihon, Iponan, Kauswagan, Lumbia, Mambuaya, Pagalungan, Pagatpat, Patag, Pigsag-an, San Simon, Taglimao, Tagpangi, Tignapoloan, Tuburan, Tumpagon
2		Jose Benjamin Benaldo	June 30, 2010	June 30, 2013	15th	Nacionalista	Elected in 2010.	2007–present Baikingon, Balulang, Bayabas, Bayanga, Besigan, Bonbon, Bulua, Calaanan, Canitoan, Carmen, Dansolihon, Iponan, Kauswagan, Lumbia, Mambuaya, Pagalungan, Pagatpat, Patag, Pigsag-an, San Simon, Taglimao, Tagpangi, Tignapoloan, Tuburan, Tumpagon
(1)		Rolando Uy	June 30, 2013	June 30, 2022	16th	Liberal	Elected in 2013.	2007–present Baikingon, Balulang, Bayabas, Bayanga, Besigan, Bonbon, Bulua, Calaanan, Canitoan, Carmen, Dansolihon, Iponan, Kauswagan, Lumbia, Mambuaya, Pagalungan, Pagatpat, Patag, Pigsag-an, San Simon, Taglimao, Tagpangi, Tignapoloan, Tuburan, Tumpagon
(1)		Rolando Uy	June 30, 2013	June 30, 2022	17th	PDP–Laban	Re-elected in 2016.	2007–present Baikingon, Balulang, Bayabas, Bayanga, Besigan, Bonbon, Bulua, Calaanan, Canitoan, Carmen, Dansolihon, Iponan, Kauswagan, Lumbia, Mambuaya, Pagalungan, Pagatpat, Patag, Pigsag-an, San Simon, Taglimao, Tagpangi, Tignapoloan, Tuburan, Tumpagon
(1)		Rolando Uy	June 30, 2013	June 30, 2022	18th	NUP	Re-elected in 2019.	2007–present Baikingon, Balulang, Bayabas, Bayanga, Besigan, Bonbon, Bulua, Calaanan, Canitoan, Carmen, Dansolihon, Iponan, Kauswagan, Lumbia, Mambuaya, Pagalungan, Pagatpat, Patag, Pigsag-an, San Simon, Taglimao, Tagpangi, Tignapoloan, Tuburan, Tumpagon
3		Lordan Suan	June 30, 2022	Incumbent	19th	Nacionalista (PADAYN)	Elected in 2022.	2007–present Baikingon, Balulang, Bayabas, Bayanga, Besigan, Bonbon, Bulua, Calaanan, Canitoan, Carmen, Dansolihon, Iponan, Kauswagan, Lumbia, Mambuaya, Pagalungan, Pagatpat, Patag, Pigsag-an, San Simon, Taglimao, Tagpangi, Tignapoloan, Tuburan, Tumpagon
3		Lordan Suan	June 30, 2022	Incumbent	19th	Lakas (PADAYN)	Elected in 2022.	2007–present Baikingon, Balulang, Bayabas, Bayanga, Besigan, Bonbon, Bulua, Calaanan, Canitoan, Carmen, Dansolihon, Iponan, Kauswagan, Lumbia, Mambuaya, Pagalungan, Pagatpat, Patag, Pigsag-an, San Simon, Taglimao, Tagpangi, Tignapoloan, Tuburan, Tumpagon
3		Lordan Suan	June 30, 2022	Incumbent	20th	PFP (PADAYN)	Re-elected in 2025.	2007–present Baikingon, Balulang, Bayabas, Bayanga, Besigan, Bonbon, Bulua, Calaanan, Canitoan, Carmen, Dansolihon, Iponan, Kauswagan, Lumbia, Mambuaya, Pagalungan, Pagatpat, Patag, Pigsag-an, San Simon, Taglimao, Tagpangi, Tignapoloan, Tuburan, Tumpagon

== Election results ==
=== 2025 ===
2025 Philippine House of Representatives elections in Cagayan de Oro's 1st district
Candidate	Party	Votes	%
Lordan Suan (incumbent)	Lakas–CMD	88,526	50.99
Kikang Uy	Aksyon Demokratiko	85,099	49.01
Total		173,625	100.00
Valid votes		173,625	94.08
Invalid/blank votes		10,930	5.92
Total votes		184,555	100.00
Registered voters/turnout		211,679	87.19
Lakas–CMD hold			
Source: Commission on Elections

=== 2022 ===
2022 Philippine House of Representatives elections in Cagayan de Oro's 1st district
Candidate	Party	Votes	%
Lordan Suan	Padayon Pilipino	76,832	54.10
Joaquin Uy	National Unity Party	63,567	44.76
Tito Mora	Bagumbayan–VNP	1,607	1.13
Total		142,006	100.00
Total votes		151,492	–
Registered voters/turnout		177,163	85.51
Padayon Pilipino gain from National Unity Party			
Source: Commission on Elections

=== 2019 ===
2019 Philippine House of Representatives elections at Cagayan de Oro's 1st District
Party	Candidate	Votes	%
PDP–Laban	Rolando Uy	81,595	
PADAYN	Caesar Ian Acenas	23,010	
PFP	Gil Banaag	3,652	
Total votes			

=== 2016 ===
2016 Philippine House of Representatives elections at Cagayan de Oro's 1st District
Party	Candidate	Votes	%
Liberal	Rolando Uy	57,094	52.71%
Independent	Lourdes Darimbang	51,208	47.28%
Total votes		108,302	100.00%

=== 2010 ===
2010 Philippine House of Representatives elections in Cagayan de Oro's 1st district
Candidate	Party	Votes	%
Jose Benjamin Benaldo	Pwersa ng Masang Pilipino	31,652	34.66
Rainier Joaquin Uy	Lakas–Kampi–CMD	29,872	32.72
Lourdes Candy Darimbang	Independent	26,298	28.80
Tito Dichosa	Independent	2,134	2.34
Dulcisimo Ytem Sr.	Independent	1,353	1.48
Total		91,309	100.00
Valid votes		91,309	93.41
Invalid/blank votes		6,438	6.59
Total votes		97,747	100.00
Pwersa ng Masang Pilipino gain from Lakas–Kampi–CMD			
Source: Commission on Elections

== See also ==
- Legislative districts of Cagayan de Oro
