= Libona =

Municipality in Bukidnon, Philippines

- Municipality
- Municipality of Libona
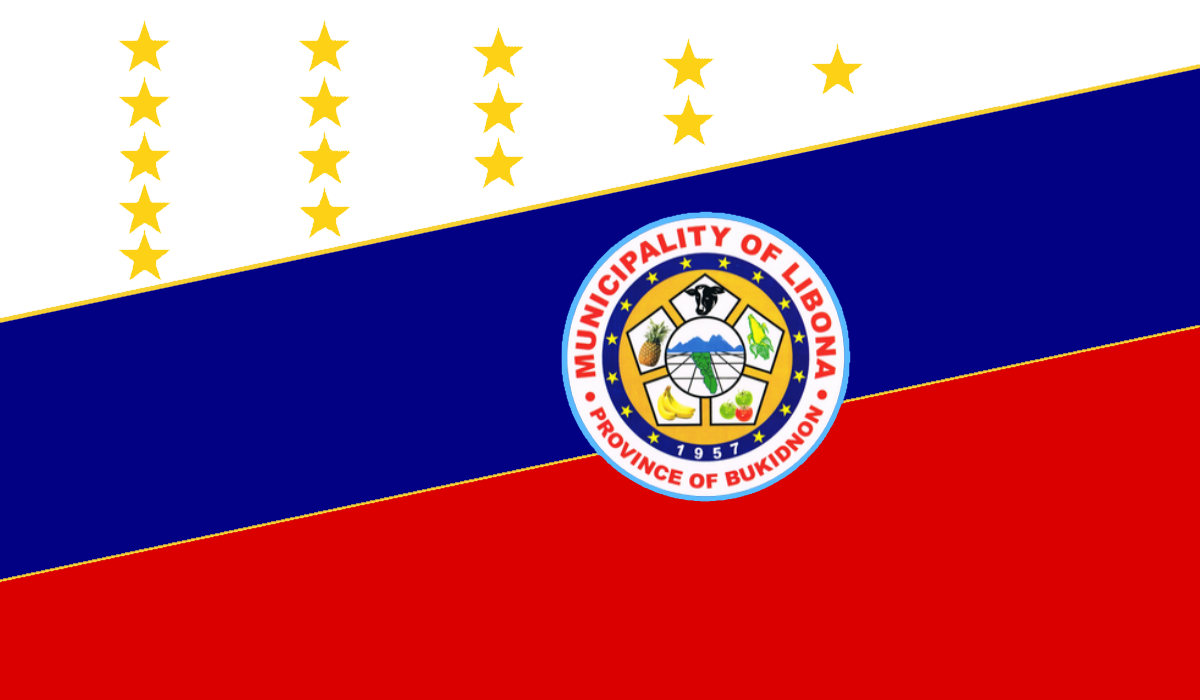
- Flag Seal

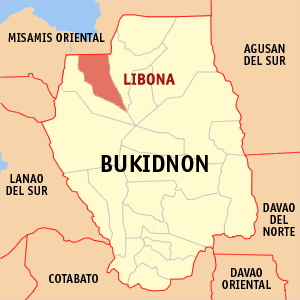
- Map of Bukidnon with Libona highlighted
- Interactive map of Libona
- Location within the Philippines
- Coordinates: 8°20′00″N 124°44′36″E
- Country: Philippines
- Region: Northern Mindanao
- Province: Bukidnon
- District: 1st district
- Founded: October 4, 1957
- Barangays: 14 (see Barangays)

Government
  - Type: Sangguniang Bayan
  - Mayor: Aurelio B. Lopez
  - Vice Mayor: Leonardo Genesis T. Calingasan
  - Representative: Joeman Alba
  - Municipal Council: Members: Hannalee T. Calingasan; Ian Abas; Junjun Gabito; Vladimir Gallego; Fernando Ibarrita; Tawing Woo; Rex Tacandong; Rella A. Fernandez
  - Electorate: 31,137 voters (2025)

Area
  - Total: 374.37 km^{2} (144.55 sq mi)
- Elevation: 562 m (1,844 ft)
- Highest elevation: 792 m (2,598 ft)
- Lowest elevation: 345 m (1,132 ft)

Population (2024 census)
  - Total: 51,555
  - Density: 137.71/km^{2} (356.67/sq mi)
  - Households: 11,311

Economy
  - Income class: 1st municipal income class
  - Poverty incidence: 28.25% (2023)
  - Revenue: ₱ 294 million (2024)
  - Assets: ₱ 952.3 million (2024)
  - Expenditure: ₱ 268.9 million (2024)
  - Liabilities: ₱ 210.9 million (2024)

Service provider
  - Electricity: Bukidnon 2 Electric Cooperative (BUSECO)
- Time zone: UTC+8 (PST)
- ZIP code: 8706
- PSGC: 1001311000
- IDD : area code: +63 (0)88
- Native languages: Binukid; Cebuano; Ata Manobo; Tagalog
- Website: www.libonabuk.gov.ph

Libona, officially the Municipality of Libona (Bukid and Higaonon: Banuwa ta Libona; Cebuano: Lungsod sa Libona; Tagalog: Bayan ng Libona), is a municipality in the province of Bukidnon, Philippines. According to the 2024 census, it has a population of 51,555 people.

Libona is situated in the northern part of the province and is approximately 103 kilometers from Malaybalay, the capital city of Bukidnon. The municipality can be reached from Cagayan de Oro, the major trade center of Northern Mindanao, through a 52 kilometer-route passing Barangay Alae of Manolo Fortich, or through a 32 kilometer road northward passing Barangay Indahag, Cagayan de Oro.

== History ==
According to folk history, gold had flourished in the locality that prompted people from the neighboring towns flocked into this place in their quest for the golden fame and fortune. It was said that on January 17, 1817, A Spanish soldier who was on patrol was tasked to write down the names of the places he would come across within the course of his mission. He happened to pass by a group of men who were digging gold on one of the gold mines. Talking in Spanish, the soldier inquired about the name of the place. The natives, who did not understand the language, thought the soldier was asking them how many gold ores they have already gathered. In response, the natives answered "libo na", meaning a thousand already. The Spanish soldier jotted the word "Libona" in his logbook believing it was the name of the locality.

Libona was once a municipal district of Maluko, now the Municipality of Manolo Fortich, Bukidnon, created under EO No. 5 dated April 4, 1917 issued by then acting Governor Ponciano C. Reyes of the defunct Department of Mindanao and Sulu. Due to its progressive stride in both the socio-economic and political infrastructure, Libona was finally able to separate itself from its mother municipality when it was granted political identity. then President Carlos P. Garcia, issued EO No. 272, dated October 4, 1957 declaring Libona a regular municipality. By virtue of the said order, Libona became the 14th municipality in the province of Bukidnon.

== Geography ==
Libona borders Cagayan de Oro in the north, Baungon in the west and south, and Manolo Fortich in the east.

=== Barangays ===
Libona is politically subdivided into 14 barangays. Each barangay consists of puroks while some have sitios.

PSGC	Barangay	Population			±% p.a.	
		2024		2010		
101311001	Capihan	4.4%	2,273	2,067	▴	0.66%
101311002	Crossing	8.9%	4,578	4,369	▴	0.32%
101311003	Gango	12.0%	6,173	4,884	▴	1.64%
101311004	Kiliog	4.7%	2,418	1,440	▴	3.66%
101311005	Kinawe	7.9%	4,062	3,815	▴	0.44%
101311006	Laturan	5.7%	2,927	2,921	▴	0.01%
101311007	Maambong	4.3%	2,239	1,917	▴	1.08%
101311008	Nangka	3.5%	1,784	1,515	▴	1.14%
101311009	Palabucan	3.1%	1,594	1,333	▴	1.25%
101311010	Poblacion	6.7%	3,471	3,113	▴	0.76%
101311011	Pongol	6.9%	3,579	3,485	▴	0.18%
101311012	San Jose	7.3%	3,738	3,387	▴	0.69%
101311013	Santa Fe	4.2%	2,154	2,506	▾	−1.05%
101311014	Sil‑ipon	5.8%	2,979	2,641	▴	0.84%
	Total		51,555	39,393	▴	1.89%

=== Climate ===
Climate data for Libona, Bukidnon
Month	Jan	Feb	Mar	Apr	May	Jun	Jul	Aug	Sep	Oct	Nov	Dec	Year
Mean daily maximum °C (°F)	25 (77)	25 (77)	26 (79)	27 (81)	27 (81)	26 (79)	26 (79)	26 (79)	26 (79)	26 (79)	26 (79)	25 (77)	26 (79)
Mean daily minimum °C (°F)	21 (70)	20 (68)	20 (68)	21 (70)	22 (72)	22 (72)	22 (72)	22 (72)	22 (72)	22 (72)	21 (70)	21 (70)	21 (71)
Average precipitation mm (inches)	271 (10.7)	217 (8.5)	193 (7.6)	178 (7.0)	344 (13.5)	423 (16.7)	362 (14.3)	358 (14.1)	329 (13.0)	320 (12.6)	322 (12.7)	260 (10.2)	3,577 (140.9)
Average rainy days	23.2	19.5	22.0	22.8	29.6	28.9	30.3	29.8	28.1	28.8	26.1	24.1	313.2
Source: Meteoblue

== Demographics ==
Population census of Libona
Year	Pop.	±% p.a.
1918	1,547	—
1939	3,727	+4.28%
1948	4,406	+1.88%
1960	10,653	+7.63%
1970	14,988	+3.47%
1975	16,481	+1.92%
1980	21,229	+5.19%
1990	29,652	+3.40%
1995	31,897	+1.38%
2000	33,273	+0.91%
2007	35,670	+0.96%
2010	39,393	+3.68%
2015	43,969	+2.12%
2020	48,965	+2.29%
2024	51,555	+1.25%
Source: Philippine Statistics Authority

In the 2024 census, the population of Libona was 51,555 people, with a density of 140 inhabitants per square kilometre or 360 inhabitants per square mile.

== Economy ==
Poverty incidence of Libona (%)

Source: Philippine Statistics Authority

== Local government ==
Municipal officials:

- Mayor: Aurelio B. Lopez
- Vice Mayor:Tawing Woo(IND)
- Sangguniang Bayan Members:

1. Ursula Buta (BPP)

2. Feliciano Gabito Jr. (BPP)

3. Dingdong Woo (IND)

4. Anding Ibarita (BPP)

5. Rex Tacandong (BPP)

6. Czar Ian Abas (BPP)

7. Vladimir Gallego (BPP)

8. offrey Fernandez (IND)

== Education ==
- Learning Centers

The MSWDO have established several Children learning centers in the municipality where in fact every barangays have one or two centers and it includes the National Child Development Center.

DepEd Libona are divided into two districts; the Libona 1 and Libona 2

- Elementary Schools

Currently Libona have 23 public and 2 private Elementary Schools that caters the youth of the different barangays in the municipality.

- Junior/Senior High Schools

1.Libona National High School (Crossing)

2.Kinawe National High School (Kinawe)

3.Hossana Academy of Bukidnon Inc. (Gango)

4.Sil-ipon Integrated School (Sil-ipon)

5. Libona National High School-Poblacion Extension (Poblacion)

6. Libona National High School- Pongol Extension (Pongol)

Tertiary/Higher institutions

1.Bukidnon State University (BukSU)-Libona Campus (Poblacion)

Vocational/Training School

1. Woo Stride Training and Assessment Center (Crossing, Libona)

And also every barangay hosted Alternative Learning Systems for the out of-school-youth in the municipality.
