= Jonathan Keith Flores =

Filipino lawyer and politician (born 1972)

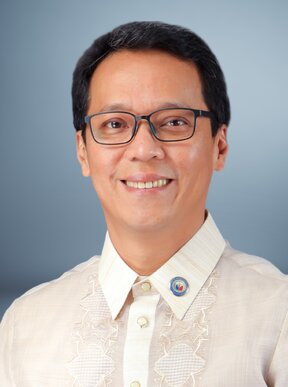
- Official portrait, 2025

Member of the Philippine House of Representatives from Bukidnon's 2nd District
- Incumbent
- Assumed office June 30, 2019
- Preceded by: Florencio T. Flores Jr.

Personal details
- Born: April 16, 1972 (age 54) Butuan, Agusan del Norte, Philippines
- Party: Lakas (2023–present)
- Other political affiliations: Nacionalista (2021–2023); PDP–Laban (2018–2021)
- Education: University of the Philippines Cebu (BA); Ateneo de Davao University (LLB)
- Profession: Lawyer; politician

Jonathan Keith "John" Tello Flores (born April 16, 1972) is a Filipino lawyer and politician who has served as the representative for Bukidnon's second district since 2019. Running under the ruling PDP–Laban party in the May 13, 2019, elections, he defeated outgoing Malaybalay Mayor Ignacio Zubiri in his first congressional race.

== Early life and career ==
Jonathan Keith Flores was born on April 16, 1972, in Butuan, Agusan del Norte, Philippines. He pursued a law degree, earning a Bachelor of Laws at Ateneo de Davao University. After graduating, he became a partner at Europa, Dacanay, Cubelo, Europa, Flores Law Office.

== House of Representatives ==
Flores began his political career in 2019 when he was elected as the representative of Bukidnon's 2nd legislative district, defeating then-Malaybalay Mayor Ignacio Zubiri. He was re-elected for a second term in 2022 and continues to serve in the 19th Congress. He is running again for congressman in 2025.

In February 2025, Flores commented on the impeachment proceedings against Vice President Sara Duterte, stating that the process faced time constraints.

== Personal life ==
Flores is the son of Florencio T. Flores Jr., a former congressman and mayor of Malaybalay, Bukidnon.

== Electoral history ==
Electoral history of Jonathan Keith Flores
Year	Office	Party	Votes received				Result
Year	Office	Party	Total	%	P.	Swing	Result
2019	Representative (Bukidnon–2nd)	PDP–Laban	90,944	—N/a	1st	—N/a	Won
2022	Representative (Bukidnon–2nd)	Nacionalista	118,031	62.71%	1st	—N/a	Won
2025	Representative (Bukidnon–2nd)	Lakas	158,115	83.47%	1st	—N/a	Won
