= Malou Acosta-Alba =

Filipino politician

Member of the House of Representatives from Bukidnon's 1st District
- In office June 30, 2013 – June 30, 2022
- Preceded by: Jesus Emmanuel M. Paras
- Succeeded by: Jose Manuel Alba

Personal details
- Born: Maria Lourdes Olaivar Acosta
- Party: Bukidnon Paglaum (2016–present)
- Other political affiliations: Liberal (2013–2016)
- Spouse: Jose Manuel Alba
- Relations: Nereus Acosta (brother)
- Parent: Socorro Acosta (mother)

Maria Lourdes "Malou" Acosta-Alba is a Filipino politician who was a member of the House of Representatives. She represented Bukidnon's 1st congressional district from 2013 to 2022.

She was the Chair of the Women and Gender Equality Committee, Vice-Chairs of the Committee of Natural Resources and Committee of Climate Change of the House of Representatives during the 18th Congress.

Acosta-Alba is the primary author of the Anti-Child Marriage Law.

== See also ==
- List of female members of the House of Representatives of the Philippines
- 16th Congress of the Philippines
- 17th Congress of the Philippines
- 18th Congress of the Philippines

House of Representatives of the Philippines
Preceded by Jesus Emmanuel Paras	Member of the House of Representatives from Bukidnon's 1st district 2013–2022	Succeeded by Jose Manuel Alba
