= Bukidnon's 2nd congressional district =

House of Representatives of the Philippines legislative district

- Constituency for the House of Representatives of the Philippines
- Boundary of Bukidnon's 2nd congressional district in Bukidnon
- Location of Bukidnon within the Philippines
- Province: Bukidnon
- Region: Northern Mindanao
- Population: 374,395 (2015)
- Electorate: 247,814 (2022)
- Major settlements: 5 LGUs: Cities; Malaybalay; Municipalities; Cabanglasan; Impasugong; Lantapan; San Fernando
- Area: 3,297.07 km^{2} (1,273.01 sq mi)

Current constituency
- Created: 1987
- Representative: Jonathan Keith Flores
- Political party: Lakas–CMD
- Congressional bloc: Majority

Bukidnon's 2nd congressional district is one of the four congressional districts of the Philippines in the province of Bukidnon. It has been represented in the House of Representatives since 1987. The district encompasses the provincial capital city of Malaybalay and the entire eastern frontier of Bukidnon bordering the Caraga and Davao regions. Its municipalities are Cabanglasan, Impasugong, Lantapan and San Fernando. Prior to redistricting in 2012, the district also covered the city of Valencia. It is currently represented in the 20th Congress by Jonathan Keith Flores of the Lakas–CMD.

== Representation history ==
#	Image	Member	Term of office		Congress	Party	Electoral history	Constituent LGUs
#	Image	Member	Start	End	Congress	Party	Electoral history	Constituent LGUs
=== Bukidnon's 2nd district for the House of Representatives of the Philippines ===
District created February 2, 1987 from Bukidnon's at-large district.
1		Violeta T. Labaria	June 30, 1987	June 30, 1992	8th	PDP–Laban	Elected in 1987.	1987–2013; Cabanglasan, Impasugong, Lantapan, Malaybalay, San Fernando, Valencia
2		Reginaldo N. Tilanduca	June 30, 1992	June 30, 2001	9th	NPC	Elected in 1992.	1987–2013; Cabanglasan, Impasugong, Lantapan, Malaybalay, San Fernando, Valencia
2		Reginaldo N. Tilanduca	June 30, 1992	June 30, 2001	10th	Lakas	Re-elected in 1995.	1987–2013; Cabanglasan, Impasugong, Lantapan, Malaybalay, San Fernando, Valencia
2		Reginaldo N. Tilanduca	June 30, 1992	June 30, 2001	11th	Lakas	Re-elected in 1998.	1987–2013; Cabanglasan, Impasugong, Lantapan, Malaybalay, San Fernando, Valencia
3		Berthobal R. Ancheta Sr.	June 30, 2001	June 30, 2004	12th	Lakas	Elected in 2001.	1987–2013; Cabanglasan, Impasugong, Lantapan, Malaybalay, San Fernando, Valencia
4		Teofisto Guingona III	June 30, 2004	June 30, 2010	13th	Nacionalista	Elected in 2004.	1987–2013; Cabanglasan, Impasugong, Lantapan, Malaybalay, San Fernando, Valencia
4		Teofisto Guingona III	June 30, 2004	June 30, 2010	14th	Liberal	Re-elected in 2007.	1987–2013; Cabanglasan, Impasugong, Lantapan, Malaybalay, San Fernando, Valencia
5		Florencio T. Flores Jr.	June 30, 2010	June 30, 2019	15th	Nacionalista	Elected in 2010.	1987–2013; Cabanglasan, Impasugong, Lantapan, Malaybalay, San Fernando, Valencia
5		Florencio T. Flores Jr.	June 30, 2010	June 30, 2019	16th	Nacionalista	Re-elected in 2013.	2013–present Cabanglasan, Impasugong, Lantapan, Malaybalay, San Fernando
5		Florencio T. Flores Jr.	June 30, 2010	June 30, 2019	17th	Nacionalista	Re-elected in 2016.	2013–present Cabanglasan, Impasugong, Lantapan, Malaybalay, San Fernando
6		Jonathan Keith T. Flores	June 30, 2019	Incumbent	18th	PDP–Laban	Elected in 2019.	2013–present Cabanglasan, Impasugong, Lantapan, Malaybalay, San Fernando
6		Jonathan Keith T. Flores	June 30, 2019	Incumbent	19th	Nacionalista	Re-elected in 2022.	2013–present Cabanglasan, Impasugong, Lantapan, Malaybalay, San Fernando
6		Jonathan Keith T. Flores	June 30, 2019	Incumbent	20th	Lakas	Re-elected in 2025.	2013–present Cabanglasan, Impasugong, Lantapan, Malaybalay, San Fernando

== Election results ==
=== 2025 ===
Candidate	Party	Votes	%
Jonathan Keith Flores (incumbent)	Lakas–CMD	158,115	83.47
Bernardo Mendoza	Independent	31,313	16.53
Total		189,428	100.00
Valid votes		189,428	83.41
Invalid/blank votes		37,674	16.59
Total votes		227,102	100.00
Registered voters/turnout		267,163	85.01
Lakas–CMD hold			
Source: Commission on Elections

=== 2022 ===
Candidate	Party	Votes	%
Jonathan Keith Flores (incumbent)	Nacionalista Party	118,031	62.71
Richard Macas	Bukidnon Paglaum	70,192	37.29
Total		188,223	100.00
Total votes		217,793	–
Registered voters/turnout		247,814	87.89
Nacionalista Party hold			
Source: Commission on Elections

== See also ==
- Legislative districts of Bukidnon
