= Bukidnon's 1st congressional district =

House of Representatives of the Philippines legislative district

- Constituency for the House of Representatives of the Philippines
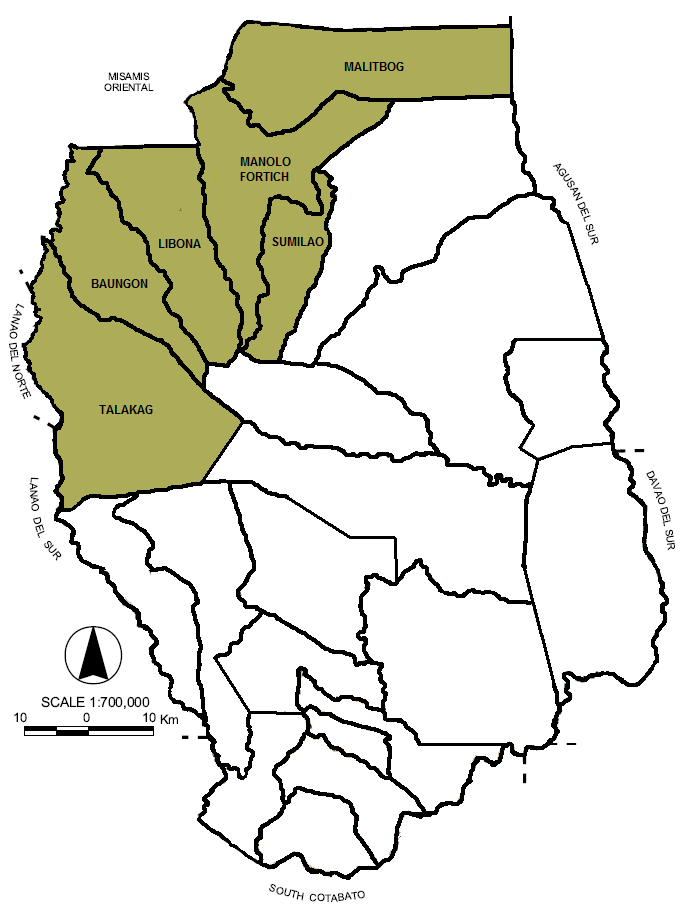
- Boundary of Bukidnon's 1st congressional district in Bukidnon

- Location of Bukidnon within the Philippines
- Province: Bukidnon
- Region: Northern Mindanao
- Population: 332,575 (2020)
- Electorate: 205,494 (2022)
- Major settlements: 6 LGUs: Municipalities; Baungon; Libona; Malitbog; Manolo Fortich; Sumilao; Talakag
- Area: 2,681.51 km^{2} (1,035.34 sq mi)

Current constituency
- Created: 1987
- Representative: Jose Manuel F. Alba
- Political party: BPP; NUP
- Congressional bloc: Majority

Bukidnon's 1st congressional district is one of the four congressional districts of the Philippines in the province of Bukidnon. It has been represented in the House of Representatives since 1987. The district encompasses the entire northern frontier of Bukidnon bordering Cagayan de Oro and Misamis Oriental. It consists of the municipalities of Baungon, Libona, Malitbog, Manolo Fortich, Sumilao and Talakag. Prior to redistricting in 2012, the district stretched further south to include the municipalities of Kalilangan and Pangantucan. It is currently represented in the 20th Congress by Jose Manuel F. Alba of the Bukidnon Paglaum Party (BPP) and National Unity Party (NUP).

== Representation history ==
#	Image	Member	Term of office		Congress	Party	Electoral history	Constituent LGUs
#	Image	Member	Start	End	Congress	Party	Electoral history	Constituent LGUs
=== Bukidnon's 1st district for the House of Representatives of the Philippines ===
District created February 2, 1987 from Bukidnon's at-large district.
1		Socorro O. Acosta	June 30, 1987	June 30, 1998	8th	Liberal	Elected in 1987.	1987–2013; Baungon, Kalilangan, Libona, Malitbog, Manolo Fortich, Pangantucan, Sumilao, Talakag
1		Socorro O. Acosta	June 30, 1987	June 30, 1998	9th	Liberal	Re-elected in 1992.	1987–2013; Baungon, Kalilangan, Libona, Malitbog, Manolo Fortich, Pangantucan, Sumilao, Talakag
1		Socorro O. Acosta	June 30, 1987	June 30, 1998	10th	Liberal	Re-elected in 1995.	1987–2013; Baungon, Kalilangan, Libona, Malitbog, Manolo Fortich, Pangantucan, Sumilao, Talakag
2		Nereus Acosta	June 30, 1998	June 30, 2007	11th	Liberal	Elected in 1998.	1987–2013; Baungon, Kalilangan, Libona, Malitbog, Manolo Fortich, Pangantucan, Sumilao, Talakag
2		Nereus Acosta	June 30, 1998	June 30, 2007	12th	Liberal	Re-elected in 2001.	1987–2013; Baungon, Kalilangan, Libona, Malitbog, Manolo Fortich, Pangantucan, Sumilao, Talakag
2		Nereus Acosta	June 30, 1998	June 30, 2007	13th	Liberal	Re-elected in 2004.	1987–2013; Baungon, Kalilangan, Libona, Malitbog, Manolo Fortich, Pangantucan, Sumilao, Talakag
3		Candido Pancrudo Jr.	June 30, 2007	June 30, 2010	14th	Lakas	Elected in 2007.	1987–2013; Baungon, Kalilangan, Libona, Malitbog, Manolo Fortich, Pangantucan, Sumilao, Talakag
4		Jesus Emmanuel M. Paras	June 30, 2010	June 30, 2013	15th	NPC	Elected in 2010.	1987–2013; Baungon, Kalilangan, Libona, Malitbog, Manolo Fortich, Pangantucan, Sumilao, Talakag
5		Maria Lourdes Acosta-Alba	June 30, 2013	June 30, 2022	16th	Liberal	Elected in 2013.	2013–present Baungon, Libona, Malitbog, Manolo Fortich, Sumilao, Talakag
5		Maria Lourdes Acosta-Alba	June 30, 2013	June 30, 2022	17th	BPP	Re-elected in 2016.	2013–present Baungon, Libona, Malitbog, Manolo Fortich, Sumilao, Talakag
5		Maria Lourdes Acosta-Alba	June 30, 2013	June 30, 2022	18th	BPP	Re-elected in 2019.	2013–present Baungon, Libona, Malitbog, Manolo Fortich, Sumilao, Talakag
6		Jose Manuel Alba	June 30, 2022	Incumbent	19th	Lakas (BPP)	Elected in 2022.	2013–present Baungon, Libona, Malitbog, Manolo Fortich, Sumilao, Talakag
6		Jose Manuel Alba	June 30, 2022	Incumbent	20th	NUP (BPP)	Re-elected in 2025.	2013–present Baungon, Libona, Malitbog, Manolo Fortich, Sumilao, Talakag

== Election results ==
=== 2025 ===
Candidate	Party	Votes	%
Jose Manuel Alba (incumbent)	Lakas–CMD	101,011	55.25
Jose Earl Navarro	Partido Federal ng Pilipinas	72,819	39.83
Nereus Acosta	Independent	8,988	4.92
Total		182,818	100.00
Valid votes		182,818	93.30
Invalid/blank votes		13,137	6.70
Total votes		195,955	100.00
Registered voters/turnout		217,275	90.19
Lakas–CMD hold			
Source: Commission on Elections

=== 2022 ===
Candidate	Party	Votes	%
Jose Manuel Alba	Bukidnon Paglaum	90,190	58.98
Nereus Acosta	Independent	61,508	40.22
Jun Eligan	Workers' and Peasants' Party	1,229	0.80
Total		152,927	100.00
Total votes		180,164	–
Registered voters/turnout		205,494	87.67
Bukidnon Paglaum hold			
Source: Commission on Elections

== See also ==
- Legislative districts of Bukidnon
