= Talakag =

Municipality in Bukidnon, Philippines

- Municipality
- Municipality of Talakag
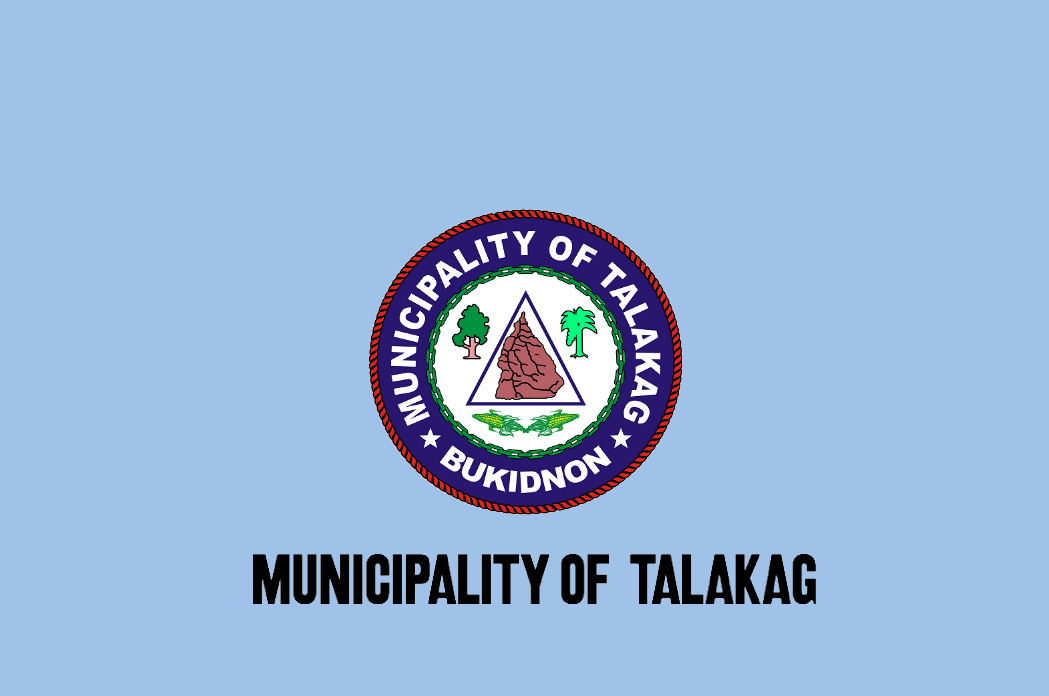
- Flag Seal
- Nickname: The Highlander's Golden Paradise of Bukidnon
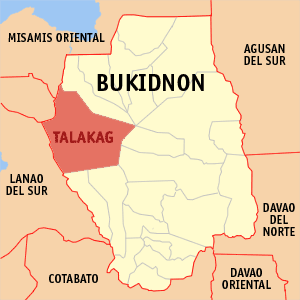
- Map of Bukidnon with Talakag highlighted
- Interactive map of Talakag
- Location within the Philippines
- Coordinates: 8°13′55″N 124°36′09″E
- Country: Philippines
- Region: Northern Mindanao
- Province: Bukidnon
- District: 1st district
- Founded: February 22, 1917
- Barangays: 29 (see Barangays)

Government
  - Type: Sangguniang Bayan
  - Mayor: Renato S. Sulatan Jr.
  - Vice Mayor: Vergito O. Factura
  - Representative: Jose Manuel Alba
  - Municipal Council: Members: Rey Anthony Sulatan; Lucky Bryan Noble; Amando Noble III; Marilyn Tinoy; Grace Factura; Romeo Tianzon Jr.; Arnelito Lowao; Papo Sabang
  - Electorate: 50,078 voters (2025)

Area
  - Total: 786.40 km^{2} (303.63 sq mi)
- Elevation: 409 m (1,342 ft)
- Highest elevation: 728 m (2,388 ft)
- Lowest elevation: 186 m (610 ft)

Population (2024 census)
  - Total: 81,932
  - Density: 104.19/km^{2} (269.84/sq mi)
  - Households: 16,532

Economy
  - Income class: 1st municipal income class
  - Poverty incidence: 40.52% (2023)
  - Revenue: ₱ 491.3 million (2024)
  - Assets: ₱ 1,208 million (2024)
  - Expenditure: ₱ 359.8 million (2024)
  - Liabilities: ₱ 299.8 million (2024)

Service provider
  - Electricity: Bukidnon 2 Electric Cooperative (BUSECO)
- Time zone: UTC+8 (PST)
- ZIP code: 8708
- PSGC: 1001320000
- IDD : area code: +63 (0)88
- Native languages: Binukid; Cebuano; Ata Manobo; Tagalog
- Major religions: Roman Catholicism, Islam
- Website: www.talakagbuk.gov.ph

Talakag, officially the Municipality of Talakag (Bukid and Higaonon: Banuwa ta Talakag; Cebuano: Lungsod sa Talakag; Tagalog: Bayan ng Talakag), is a municipality in the province of Bukidnon, Philippines. According to the 2024 census, it has a population of 81,932 people.

It is located on the border to major cities of Cagayan de Oro and Iligan, and between Marawi and Malaybalay, the provincial capital.

== History ==
In World War II, Talakag was occupied for virtually the entire war by guerrillas opposing the Japanese occupation of Mindanao. From June 8 to 29, 1944, the Japanese attacked the area. Lieut. Col. James Grinstead had his headquarters in Talakag and before a force of 500 Japanese and Korean troops could take the town, Grinstead ordered his headquarters burned. On June 28 the Japanese-Korean force left Talakag and the guerrillas moved back into town and re-established their headquarters there.

== Geography ==
=== Climate ===
Climate data for Talakag, Bukidnon
Month	Jan	Feb	Mar	Apr	May	Jun	Jul	Aug	Sep	Oct	Nov	Dec	Year
Mean daily maximum °C (°F)	26 (79)	26 (79)	27 (81)	28 (82)	28 (82)	27 (81)	27 (81)	28 (82)	28 (82)	27 (81)	27 (81)	26 (79)	27 (81)
Mean daily minimum °C (°F)	22 (72)	22 (72)	22 (72)	22 (72)	23 (73)	23 (73)	23 (73)	23 (73)	23 (73)	23 (73)	23 (73)	22 (72)	23 (73)
Average precipitation mm (inches)	271 (10.7)	217 (8.5)	193 (7.6)	178 (7.0)	344 (13.5)	423 (16.7)	362 (14.3)	358 (14.1)	329 (13.0)	320 (12.6)	322 (12.7)	260 (10.2)	3,577 (140.9)
Average rainy days	23.2	19.5	22.0	22.8	29.6	28.9	30.3	29.8	28.1	28.8	26.1	24.1	313.2
Source: Meteoblue

=== Barangays ===
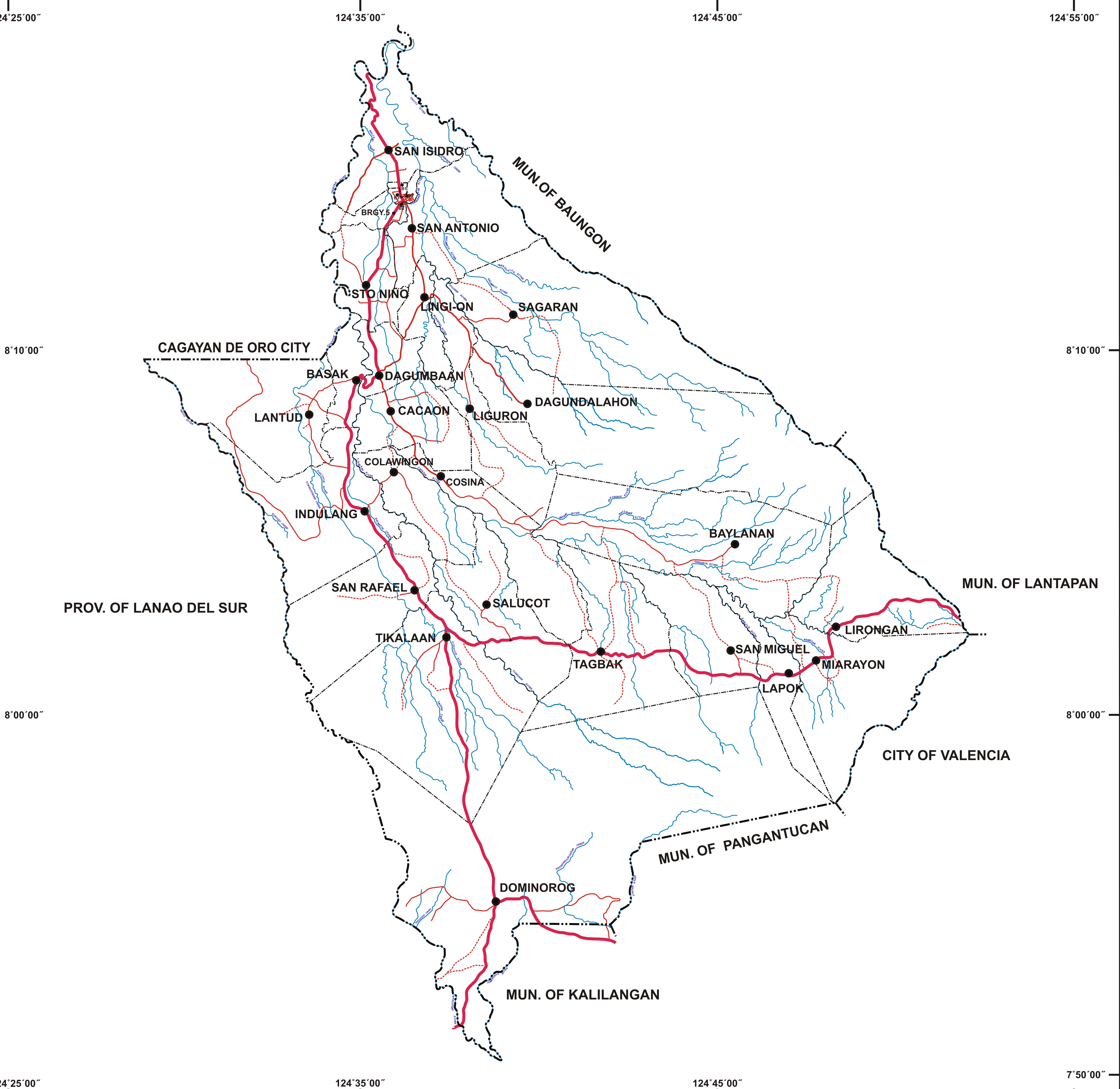
Political map of the municipality showing its 29 barangays

Talakag is politically subdivided into 29 barangays. Each barangay consists of puroks while some have sitios.

PSGC	Barangay	Population			±% p.a.	
		2024		2010		
101320001	Basak	1.9%	1,581	1,322	▴	1.25%
101320002	Baylanan	1.8%	1,486	1,354	▴	0.65%
101320003	Cacaon	2.8%	2,262	2,273	▾	−0.03%
101320004	Colawingon	1.4%	1,185	1,091	▴	0.58%
101320005	Cosina	4.1%	3,340	3,191	▴	0.32%
101320006	Dagumbaan	3.0%	2,435	2,285	▴	0.44%
101320007	Dagundalahon	2.1%	1,708	1,529	▴	0.77%
101320008	Dominorog	7.1%	5,838	5,392	▴	0.55%
101320009	Lapok	2.1%	1,737	1,671	▴	0.27%
101320010	Indulang	5.1%	4,139	3,936	▴	0.35%
101320011	Lantud	2.3%	1,854	2,472	▾	−1.98%
101320013	Liguron	1.8%	1,502	1,325	▴	0.87%
101320014	Lingi‑on	1.6%	1,344	1,161	▴	1.02%
101320015	Lirongan	4.5%	3,676	2,932	▴	1.58%
101320016	Sto. Niño (Lumbayawa)	3.7%	3,028	2,429	▴	1.54%
101320018	Miarayon	3.4%	2,746	2,602	▴	0.37%
101320019	Barangay 1 (Poblacion)	0.8%	641	1,048	▾	−3.35%
101320020	Barangay 2 (Poblacion)	1.3%	1,079	1,158	▾	−0.49%
101320021	Barangay 3 (Poblacion)	2.1%	1,703	1,477	▴	0.99%
101320022	Barangay 4 (Poblacion)	1.5%	1,243	1,266	▾	−0.13%
101320023	Barangay 5 (Poblacion)	2.8%	2,322	2,310	▴	0.04%
101320024	Sagaran	1.8%	1,474	1,450	▴	0.11%
101320025	Salucot	1.9%	1,578	1,568	▴	0.04%
101320026	San Antonio	4.7%	3,847	4,118	▾	−0.47%
101320027	San Isidro	8.3%	6,831	5,358	▴	1.70%
101320028	San Miguel	3.6%	2,939	2,551	▴	0.99%
101320029	San Rafael	3.2%	2,635	2,324	▴	0.88%
101320030	Tagbak	2.1%	1,746	1,672	▴	0.30%
101320031	Tikalaan	4.6%	3,745	3,858	▾	−0.21%
	Total		81,932	67,123	▴	1.39%

== Demographics ==
Population census of Talakag
Year	Pop.	±% p.a.
1918	8,298	—
1939	8,126	−0.10%
1948	9,661	+1.94%
1960	17,006	+4.82%
1970	22,649	+2.90%
1975	22,538	−0.10%
1980	25,055	+2.14%
1990	35,379	+3.51%
1995	39,378	+2.03%
2000	48,326	+4.49%
2007	53,316	+1.36%
2010	67,123	+8.74%
2015	71,644	+1.25%
2020	77,027	+1.54%
2024	81,932	+1.49%
Source: Philippine Statistics Authority

In the 2024 census, the population of Talakag was 81,932 people, with a density of 100 inhabitants per square kilometre or 260 inhabitants per square mile.

== Economy ==
Poverty incidence of Talakag (%)

Source: Philippine Statistics Authority
