= Padayon Pilipino =

PaDayon Pilipino
- Leader: Yevgeny "Bambi" Emano
- Founder: Vicente "Dongkoy" Emano
- Founded: 1994
- Headquarters: Tagoloan, Misamis Oriental
- National affiliation: HNP (2018–2019); Nacionalista (2013–present); PMP (2009–2013); Lakas–CMD (2004–2009); LDP (2001–2004)
- House of Representatives (Misamis Oriental and Cagayan de Oro seats only): 2 / 4
- Provincial Governor: 0 / 1
- Provincial Vice Governor: 0 / 1
- Misamis Oriental Provincial Board: 3 / 14

Website
- padayn.com.ph

PaDayon Pilipino (PADAYN) (transl. Continue Filipinos) is a political party in Mindanao. It was founded in 1994 by former Misamis Oriental governor Vicente Y. Emano.

== Notable members ==
=== Representatives ===
- Yevgeny Vincente "Bambi" Beja Emano - Representative, 2nd District, Misamis Oriental
- Lordan G. Suan - Representative, 2nd District, Cagayan de Oro City

=== Mayors ===
- Nadya Emano-Elipe - Municipal Mayor, Tagoloan, Misamis Oriental
- Meraluna Abrugar - Municipal Mayor, Claveria, Misamis Oriental
- Reynante Salvaeon - Municipal Vice Mayor, Claveria

=== Councilors ===
- Yevonna Yacine "Yvy" Emano - Councilor, 1st District, Cagayan de Oro City
- Aga Suan - Councilor, 2nd District, Cagayan de Oro City
- Bebing Elarmo - Councilor, Alubijid
- Cacoy Padillo - Councilor, Balingoan
- Bray Pabellan - Councilor, Binuangan
- Van Barros - Councilor, Claveria
- Reynando Fullo - Councilor, Claveria
- Joecard Dalman - Councilor, Claveria
- Marcelo Dalen - Councilor, Claveria
