= Jose Manuel Alba =

Filipino politician (born 1975)

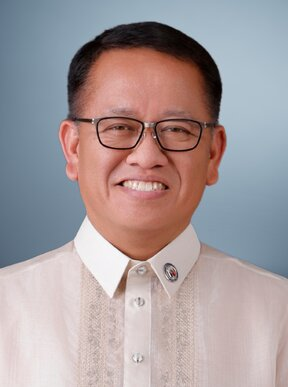
- Official portrait, 2025

Member of the Philippine House of Representatives from Bukidnon's 1st District
- Incumbent
- Assumed office June 30, 2022
- Preceded by: Maria Lourdes Acosta-Alba

Personal details
- Born: Jose Manuel Falqueza Alba; May 12, 1975 (age 51) Sampaloc, Manila, Philippines
- Party: NUP (2026–present); BPP (local party; 2021–present)
- Other political affiliations: Lakas (2024–2026)
- Spouse: Maria Lourdes Acosta-Alba
- Relations: Nereus Acosta (brother-in-law); Socorro Acosta (mother-in-law)

Jose Manuel "Joeman" Falqueza Alba (born May 12, 1975) is a Filipino politician who is a representative for the 1st District of Bukidnon in the House of Representatives of the Philippines since 2022.

== Personal life ==
Alba's wife is former representative Malou Acosta.

== Political career ==
=== Congressman ===
He ran for Bukidnon's 1st congressional district, running against his brother-in-law Nereus Acosta. He ran with the local Bukidnon Paglaum Party. During his tenure, he created, along with five other representatives, the Climate Accountability Act or House Bill 9609 on November 22, 2023. Another bill Alba created was the House Bill 9935, declaring a state of disaster allowing resources to endure proactive measures during a disaster.

=== Membership ===
As a congressman, he has multiple positions in committees, including:

Sustainable Development Goals	Vice Chairperson
Climate Change	Member for the Majority
Foreign Affairs	Member for the Majority
Government Reorganization	Member for the Majority
Inter-parliamentary Relations And Diplomacy	Member for the Majority
Micro, Small And Medium Enterprise Development	Member for the Majority
Rural Development	Member for the Majority

=== Legislative portfolio ===
Alba has principally authored a total of 130 bills and co-authored a total of 31 bills. Here are the bills which have been accepted by congress and have been made into a republic act:

Republic Act (House Bill)	Short title	Long title	Created as	Source
R.A. 11983 (HB 6510)	New Philippine Passport Act	An Act Providing a New Passport Law, Repealing for the Purpose Republic Act No. 8239, Otherwise Known as the "Philippine Passport Act of 1996", as Amended, and Providing Funds therefore	Principal Author	
R.A. 11954 (HB 6608)	Maharlika Investment Fund Act of 2023	An Act Establishing the Maharlika Investment Fund, Providing for Management, Investment, and Use of Proceeds from the Fund, and for other Purposes	Principal Author	
R.A. 11959 (HB 7751)	Regional Specialty Centers Act	An Act Establishing Specialty Centers in Department of Health Hospitals in Every Region and Government-Owned or Controlled Corporation Specialty Hospitals and Appropriating Funds Therefore	Principal Author	
R.A. 11962 (HB 8400)	Trabaho Para sa Bayan Act	An Act Establishing the National Employment Master Plan, to be Known as the "Trabaho Para sa Bayan Plan", Appropriating Funds Therefore, and for Other Purposes	Principal Author	
R.A. 11995 (HB 8443)	Philippine Ecosystem and Natural Capital Accounting System (PENCAS) Act	An Act Institutionalizing the Philippine Ecosystem and Natural Capital Accounting System, Mandating its Use in Policy and Decision-Making, Designating the Agencies Responsible Institutional Arrangements Among Responsible Agencies, and Appropriating Funds Therefore	Principal Author	

== Electoral history ==
Electoral history of Jose Manuel Alba
Year	Office	Party		Votes received				Result
Year	Office	Local	National	Total	%	P.	Swing	Result
2022	Representative (Bukidnon–1st)	BPP	—N/a	90,190	58.98%	1st	—N/a	Won
2025	Representative (Bukidnon–1st)	BPP	Lakas	101,011	55.25%	1st	—N/a	Won

House of Representatives of the Philippines
Preceded by Maria Lourdes Acosta-Alba	Member of the House of Representatives from Bukidnon's 1st district 2022–present	Incumbent
