= Constitutional Commission =

Legal entity approved by a government to review a constitution

A constitutional commission is a body of commissioners appointed by a government for the purpose of making or revising a constitution. The commissioners are typically experts. However, in a country governed by a military regime, the commissioners may be actual or alleged experts whose political opinions match those of that government, and in other countries there may perceptions or allegations that the commissioners include such persons. The commission may be advisory or preparatory to another body or to a referendum.

A number of bodies have been called a Constitutional Commission.

== Afghanistan ==
- Afghan Constitution Commission
  - Timeline of the War in Afghanistan (August 2003)
- Reigns of Nadir Shah and Zahir Shah

== Australia ==
In 1985 a Constitutional Commission was established (by the Hawke Labor government) to review the Australian Constitution and reported in 1988. It was seen as too partisan by many Liberals and the eventual referendum questions were not supported; leading to the lowest 'yes' vote count for any referendum in Australia (in 1988).

== Canada ==
The federally initiated Rowell–Sirois Commission of 1937 to 1940 recommended (successfully) that the federal government take over unemployment insurance and pensions from the provinces.

The Quebec-initiated Royal Commission of Inquiry on Constitutional Problems of 1953 to 1956 argued (unsuccessfully) for the devolution of more powers to the Province of Quebec.

The federal Royal Commission on Bilingualism and Biculturalism recommended (successfully) that Canada become officially bilingual and bicultural (later modified to multicultural).

== Philippines ==
In January 1942, the Philippine Executive Commission, or PEC, was established as the temporary caretaker government of the City of Greater Manila, and eventually, of the whole Philippines during the Japanese occupation of the country during World War II. The PEC existed until the Japanese-sponsored Second Philippine Republic was established in October 1943.

In 1986, President Corazon Aquino dissolved the 1973 Constitution and called for its revision. From February 1986 to February 1987, the Philippines was governed under a provisional constitution called the "Freedom Constitution", which was drafted by her Executive Secretary Joker Arroyo. In September 1986, the Constitutional Commission of 1986 was set up with all its members appointed by Aquino. The revised Philippine Constitution was ratified by a plebiscite with 76% of votes in the affirmative.

An unrelated concept is a "constitutional commission", which is a commission created by the 1987 Constitution. These are governmental bodies that are independent of the three main branches of government. These constitutional commissions are the:

- Civil Service Commission
- Commission on Audit
- Commission on Elections

The 1987 Constitution does not place upon a constitutional commission the task of amending the Constitution—that task falls to the Constitutional Convention, the Constituent Assembly, or the People's Initiative, the three constitutionally sanctioned methods of amending the Constitution.

== Seychelles ==
- Seychelles Constitutional Commission, established in 1992

== Tanzania ==
- Tanzanian Constitutional Review Commission

== See also ==
- Constitutional convention (political meeting)
- Constituent Assembly
