= Constitutional reform in the Philippines =

Legal process in the Philippines

Constitutional reform in the Philippines, colloquially known as charter change (cha-cha), refers to the political and legal processes needed to amend the current 1987 Constitution of the Philippines. Under the common interpretation of the Constitution, amendments can be proposed by one of three methods: a people's initiative, a constituent assembly, or a constitutional convention.

A fourth method, involving both houses passing a joint concurrent resolution with a supermajority of at least 75%, was proposed in 2015 by House Speaker Feliciano Belmonte Jr., who subsequently submitted to the House of Representatives "Resolution of Both Houses No. 1". This "simple legislation as the means to amend" would only require approval by both Houses voting separately. All proposed amendment methods must be ratified by a majority vote in a national referendum.

While no amendment to the 1987 Constitution has succeeded, there have been several high-profile attempts since the Ramos administration. None reached the ratification stage.

There are several online and mass groups that actively support constitutional reform. These include Constitutional Reform & Rectification for Economic Competitiveness & Transformation (CoRRECT Movement), led by Orion Perez Dumdum; Kilusang Pilipinismo (KP), led by Bishop Nilo Tayag; Kayumanggi Philippines, led by Nikka Gaddi; Kabalikat ng Bayan sa Kaunlaran (KABAKA); Foundation for Economic Freedom (FEF); and several pro-Duterte and pro-Marcos groups.

== Methods of charter change ==
Method	Proposal	Ratification	Source
Constituent Assembly	Vote by three-fourths of all its members, with both houses voting separately.	Plebiscite, not earlier than sixty days no later than ninety days after the submission of the amendments or revision	
Constitutional Convention	Called into existence by Congress, with a vote of two-thirds of all its Members, with both houses voting separately.; Majority vote of all of the Members of Congress, with both houses voting separately, submitting to the electorate the question of calling such a convention.	Plebiscite, not earlier than sixty days no later than ninety days after the submission of the amendments or revision	
People's Initiative	Petition of at least 12% of the total number of registered voters, of which every legislative district must be represented by at least 3% of the registered voters therein	Plebiscite, not earlier than sixty days nor later than ninety days after the certification by the Commission on Elections of the sufficiency of the petition.	

The Supreme Court ruled in 1997 that the People's Initiative method of amending the constitution is "fatally defective", or inoperable. Another ruling in 2006 on another attempt at a People's Initiative was ruled unconstitutional by the court This only leaves the Constituent Assembly and the Constitutional Convention as the valid ways to amend the constitution.

=== Consultative body ===
The President, through official proclamation or executive order, may create a consultative body that will study and propose amendments or revisions to the constitution. However, the draft of the consultative committee will only serve as a guide for the constitutional body that will propose amendments or revisions to the Constitution.

President	Consultative Body	Legal Basis	Chairperson	Composition	Proposed form of government
Jose P. Laurel	Preparatory Committee for Philippine Independence		Jorge B. Vargas	20 members: José P. Laurel; Elpidio R. Quirino; Benigno Aquino, Sr.; Ramon Avanceña; Jorge B. Vargas; Antonio de las Alas; Claro M. Recto; Quintin Paredes; José Yulo; Vicente Madrigal; Manuel Roxas; Sa Ramain (Alauya Alonto); Emiliano Tria Tirona; Melecio Arranz; Camilo Osías; Rafael Alunan Sr.; Pedro Sabido; Teofilo Sison; Manuel C. Briones	Single-party authoritarian republic
Joseph Estrada	Preparatory Commission on Constitutional Reforms	Executive Order No. 43	Andres Narvasa	19 out of 25 members: Raul Daza; Margarito Teves; Raul Concepcion; Felipe Gozon; Alberto Fenix Jr.; Conrado Vasquez; Cesar Virata; Bernardo Villegas; Cayetano Paderanga Jr.; Ceferino Padua; Froilan Bacunan; Cicero Calderon; Ramon Felipe, Ricardo Romulo.	Unitary presidential constitutional Republic with Free trade economy
Gloria Macapagal Arroyo	2005 Consultative Commission	Executive Order No. 453	José Abueva	33 out of 50 members: Carmen Pedrosa; Jarius Bondoc; Alexander Magno; Anthony Acevedo; Ronald Adamat; Emmanuel Angeles; Rene Azurin; Jose Bello Jr.; Ma. Romela Bengzon; Francis Chua; Donald Dee; Gilberto Duavit Jr.; Gerado Espina Sr.; Pablo Garcia; Nelia Gonzales; Joji Ilagan-Bian; Gonzalo Jurado; Jose Leviste Jr.; James Marty Lim; Lito Monico Lorenzana; Sergio Luiz-Ortiz Jr.; Sonny Matula; Democrito Mendoza; David Naval; Victor Ortega; Vicente Paterno; San Fernando; Oscar Rodriguez; Pedro Romualdo; Efraim Tendero; Ray Teves; Antonio Vilar; Alfonso Yuchengco.	Federal parliamentary constitutional republic
Rodrigo Duterte	Consultative Commission	Executive Order No. 10	Reynato Puno	21 out of 25 members: Aquilino Pimentel Jr; Randolph Climaco Parcasio; Antonio Arellano; Susan Ubalde-Ordinario; Arthur Aguilar; Reuben Canoy; Roan Libarios; Laurence Wacnang; Ali Pangalian Balindong; Edmund Soriano Tayao; Eddie Mapag Alih; Bienvenido Reyes; Julio Cabral Teehankee; Antonio Nachura; Rodolfo Dia Robles; Virgilio Bautista; Ranhilio Aquino; Victor de la Serna; Jose Martin Azcarraga Loon; Rex Cambronero Robles	Federal parliamentary constitutional republic

== Proposed amendments or revision to the 1987 Constitution ==
=== Ramos administration ===
The first attempt to amend the 1987 Constitution was under President Fidel V. Ramos. Among the proposed changes in the constitution were a shift to a senatorial system and the lifting of term limits of public officials. Ramos argued that the changes would bring more accountability, continuity, and responsibility to the "gridlock"-prone Philippine version of the presidential bicameral system. Some politically active religious groups, opposition politicians, business tycoons and left-wing organizations opposed the process that was supposed to lead to a national referendum. Critics argued that the proposed constitutional changes for one would benefit the incumbent, Ramos. On September 21, 1997, a church-organized rally brought in an estimated half a million people to Rizal Park.

Furthermore, on September 23, 1997, the advocates suffered a setback when the Supreme Court, under Chief Justice Andres Narvasa, dismissed a petition filed by the People's Initiative for Reform, Modernization and Action (PIRMA), which sought to amend the Constitution through a signature campaign or People's Initiative. The Supreme Court dismissed the petition on the grounds that the People's Initiative provision in the 1987 Constitution lacked an enabling law for its implementation. Had the petition been successful, a national plebiscite would have been held for the proposed changes.

=== Estrada administration ===
Under President Joseph Estrada, there was a similar attempt to change the 1987 constitution. The process is termed as CONCORD or Constitutional Correction for Development. Unlike Constitutional Reform under Ramos and Arroyo the CONCORD proposal, according to its proponents, would amend only the restrictive economic provisions of the constitution that are considered to impede the entry of more foreign investments in the Philippines.

There were, once again, objections from opposition politicians, religious sects and left-wing organizations based on diverse arguments such as national patrimony and the proposed constitutional changes would be self-serving. Again, the government was accused of pushing constitutional reform for its own vested interests.

=== Arroyo administration ===
During the term of President Gloria Macapagal Arroyo, multiple attempts were made to change the 1987 Constitution. Arroyo issued Executive Order No. 453 in August 2005 to create the Consultative Commission, headed by Dr. José Abueva. After holding consultations with different sectors of society, the commission proposed revisions to the 1987 constitution relating to a shift to a unicameral parliamentary form of government; economic liberalization; further decentralization of national government, and more empowerment of local governments through a transition to a parliamentary-federal government system. While constitutional reform and "opening up" of the Philippine economy were supported by the Philippine Chamber of Commerce and Industry and the Employers Confederation of the Philippines, these were opposed by the Makati Business Club.

==== Sigaw ng Bayan initiative ====
Sigaw ng Bayan (Cry of the People), led by former Consultative Commission member Atty. Raul Lambino, and Union of Local Authorities of the Philippines campaigned in 2005–2006 for the amendments proposed by the Consultative Commission. Sigaw ng Bayan aimed to gather enough signatures to call for a plebiscite on the proposed constitutional changes by a People's Initiative.

Religious, business, and political groups opposed the proposed amendments, citing untimeliness and contending that the incumbent President and her allies would directly benefit from the proposed changes by extending the President's term of office. The Communist Party of the Philippines (CPP) called the cha-cha process "anti-masses".

On October 25, 2006, the Supreme Court, under Chief Justice Artemio Panganiban, by a vote of 8–7, rejected Sigaw ng Bayan's initiative on two grounds:

- The initiative failed to comply with the basic requirements of the Constitution for conducting a people's initiative.
- The initiative proposed revisions and not amendments. Under the 1987 Constitution, a people's initiative cannot introduce constitutional revisions but only amendments. The Court held that changing the form of government, from presidential to parliamentary, or abolishing a house of Congress, such as the Senate, are revisions, which cannot be done by a people's initiative.

In November 2006, the Supreme Court denied with finality Sigaw ng Bayan's motions for reconsideration of the court's October 25, 2006, decision.

==== Constituent Assembly under De Venecia ====
In December 2006, House Speaker Jose de Venecia, Jr. attempted to push for the constitutional change process by convening the House of Representatives of the Philippines and the Senate of the Philippines into a Constituent Assembly, or "con-ass," one of the three modes by which the 1987 Constitution could be amended.

Former President Joseph Estrada; left-wing organizations such as BAYAN, Bro. Mike Velarde of El Shaddai, Bro. Eddie Villanueva of Jesus is Lord Movement, Butch Valdes of Philippines LaRouche Youth Movement, Jose Maria Sison of the Communist Party of the Philippines and other groups and personalities called on their followers to go home that will culminate in a major "eating rally" on December 17, 2006. A few days before the planned rally, House Speaker De Venecia retreated on the constituent assembly (con-ass) mode to give way for constitutional reform via constitutional convention (con-con): the only mode of constitutional reform that many anti-constitutional reform groups said they will support. Speaker De Venecia "challenged" everyone to support his new proposal for the election of constitutional convention delegates to be held on the same day as the May 2007 local elections. Despite the concessions made by Speaker De Venecia, opponents ignored his new proposal and still pushed through with the rally of less than an estimated 15,000 protesters. In the "eating rally," the religious leaders called on the whole nation to embrace "electric post," "face removal," and "character change" instead of systematic changes such as constitutional reform.

==== Constituent Assembly under Nograles-Pimentel ====
Monico O. Puentevella on May 7, 2008, filed House Concurrent Resolution No. 15, which supported Senate Resolution No. 10 backed by 16 senators. Unlike the Nene Pimentel Senate Resolution, Puentevella included the option of holding a constitutional convention but excluded a People's Initiative. Prospero Nograles, a self-proclaimed advocate of federalism, announced on May 1, 2008: "This federal system of government is close to my heart as a Mindanaoan leader and I'm sure most of the leaders in Mindanao will agree that we have long clamored for it. Senate Resolution 10 is a pleasant surprise because the Senate has a long history of opposing any move to amend the Constitution." The joint Senate resolution called for the creation of 11 federal states in the country by convening of Congress "into a constituent assembly for the purpose of revising the Constitution to establish a federal system of government."

Arroyo stated to visiting Swiss President Pascal Couchepin: "We advocate federalism as a way to ensure long-lasting peace in Mindanao." Press Secretary Jesus Dureza, on August 12, 2008, stated, "It's all systems go for Charter change. We are supporting Senate Joint Resolution No. 10. Naughty insinuations that she [Arroyo] was going for Cha-cha [Charter change] because she wants to extend her term in office prompted the President to make her position clear. She is calling for a constitutional amendment... in order to bring about the Bangsamoro Juridical Entity. An opportunity should be given to the whole country to avail of the reform effects of federalism. The sentiment of many people there is to give local officials more authority in order to perform better. And the federal set-up is the way forward to this. The President has approved the way forward and there's no question about it. If she has the political will to do it she has to muster political will in spite of all these noises."

Representative Victor Ortega of La Union, chairman of the House committee on constitutional amendments, said that his survey showed that 115 (94.26%) of the 123 solons were in favor of amending the Constitution. However, opposition and leftist lawmakers questioned the results and intent of Ortega's survey and called Arroyo's proposal a ploy for her "perpetuation in power" and the removal of protectionist provisions in the Charter. The survey showed 62 respondents favored constitutional reform by a constitutional assembly, and 89 respondents were in favor of shifting to a parliamentary form of government, compared to 56 who voted for federalism, and 70 respondents preferred to amend the Constitution after the 2010 presidential elections. Members of the committee on constitutional amendments would vote by the end August on whether to amend the Constitution. However, nothing came out from the proposal.

=== Aquino III administration ===
==== Belmonte's joint resolution on economic provisions ====
Under President Benigno Aquino III several proposals were put forth by different members of Congress. Senate Resolution No. 10, by Senator Pimentel, called for constitutional reform to convert to a federal republic. Cagayan de Oro Representative Rufus Rodriguez and Abante Mindanao (ABAMIN) party-list Representative Maximo Rodriguez Jr. filed a bill pushing for a federal and parliamentary government, in addition to economic liberalization.

Speaker of the House, Feliciano Belmonte, Jr., filed Resolution of Both Houses No. 1, pushing for economic liberalization. The resolution would add five words to seven economic provisions in the Constitution: "unless otherwise provided by law." The seven provisions are Section 2, Art. XII on exploration, development, and utilization of natural resources; Section 3, Art. XII on alienable lands on the public domain; Section 7, Art. XII on conveyance of private lands; Section 10, Art. XII on reserved investments; Section 11, Art. XII on grant of franchises, certificates, or any other forms of authorization for the operation of public entity; Section 4 (2), Art. XIV on ownership of educational institutions; and Section 11 (1 and 2), Art. XVI on ownership and management of mass media and on the policy for engagement in the advertising industry. Supporting economic liberalism are business groups such as the Foundation for Economic Freedom, Arangkada Philippines, and the Makati Business Club. Governmental agencies like the Department of Foreign Affairs and the Department of Trade and Industry also are calling for economic liberalization. The resolution made it through two readings in the House of Representatives but did not have a third reading.

=== Duterte administration ===
During the May 2016 election, Rodrigo Duterte stated in May 2016 that a plebiscite on the proposed replacement of the unitary state with a federal one will be held in two years.

After winning, Duterte proposed to revive the proposed form of Nene Pimentel. On December 7, 2016, President Duterte signed Executive Order No. 10 creating a consultative committee (ConCom) to review the 1987 Constitution. Then on July 3, 2018, the ConCom unanimously approved the draft constitution through voting. It was submitted to the President on or before July 9 of the same year.

Referred to as the "Bayanihan Constitution" (referring to the Filipino value of communal work) by Duterte and the consultative committee, the proposed federal charter includes an amendment that aims to prohibit elected officials from switching political parties during the first and last two years of their term, as a response to turncoat behavior. Also included are provisions that seek to ban political dynasties, barring "persons related within the second civil degree of consanguinity or affinity" from running for public office "simultaneously for more than one national and one regional or local position."

=== Marcos Jr. administration ===
Under the administration of President Bongbong Marcos, several legislators have put forward proposals to amend the provisions of the constitution. In the 19th Congress, members of the House of Representatives filed several proposals to amend the sections of the constitution regarding economic, political, and judicial reforms. Meanwhile, in the Senate, several of its members rejected proposals to amend the constitution, with Senate President Migz Zubiri stating that it was "too controversial" as the administration was just starting.

Other key officials of the Marcos administration have also expressed support for charter change. Chief Presidential Legal Counsel Juan Ponce Enrile has proposed to scrap the current constitution and form a constitutional assembly. Meanwhile, former National Security Adviser Clarita Carlos has pushed for a complete overhaul of the constitution and transition to a parliamentary government.

The Catholic Bishops' Conference of the Philippines per Broderick Pabillo on January 12, 2024, warns: "reject the ongoing signature campaign pushing for charter change through a people's initiative xxx the campaign offers money in exchange for their signatures." Severo Caermare echoes Pabillo (in his "Sulat Pamahayag" 14 January 2024 on "ongoing signature gathering wherein money was offered to the voters") joined by his hundred priests of the Diocese of Dipolog said that "a people’s initiative not coming from the people and without prior consultation may only end up favoring a few interests."

==== RBH No. 6 and RBH No. 7 ====
On March 19, 2024, the Philippine House Committee on Constitutional Amendments approved on third and final reading "Resolution of Both Houses No. 7" the economic charter change (Cha-cha), that will amend economic provisions in the 1987 Constitution of the Philippines. RBH 7 removes the 40% foreign ownership limit for public utilities, education and advertising firms. Resolution of Both Houses No. 6, is still pending in the Philippine Senate Committee on Constitutional Amendments and Revision of Codes. RBH No. 6 and RBH No. 7 are both entitled, “A Resolution of Both Houses of Congress proposing amendments to certain economic provisions of the 1987 Constitution of the Republic of the Philippines, particularly on Articles Xll, XlV and XVl.”

==== National Unity Party's House Bill No. 5870 ====
Members of the National Unity Party, led by its chairman House deputy speaker Ronaldo Puno, filed House Bill No. 5870 on November 12, 2025 which seeks to convene a constitutional convention in May 2026. Puno cited that due to the people's distrust in Congress following the controversy on anomalous flood control projects, delegates will be elected instead of the incumbent lawmakers sitting as a constituent assembly, to address issues on several provisions of the 1987 Constitution. Proposed amendments aim to address issues on the ambiguity of terminologies on the rule on impeachment proceedings, and on the manner Congress must vote on tax exemption laws and presidential amnesty, whether jointly or separately. A previous resolution was filed leaders of the majority bloc proposing the lowering of the age requirement for candidates running for president, vice president, senator, and congressman, which was discussed during a meeting of the House Committee on Constitutional Amendments alongside HB 5870 on the same day it was filed.
