= Philippine House Committee on Constitutional Amendments =

Standing committee of the House of Representatives of the Philippines

Committee on Constitutional Amendments
- 20th Congress

History
- New session started: July 28, 2025

Leadership
- Chair: Rufus Rodriguez, CDP since July 30, 2025
- Minority Leader: Vacant since June 30, 2025

Website
- Committee on Constitutional Amendments

The Philippine House Committee on Constitutional Amendments, or House Constitutional Amendments Committee is a standing committee of the Philippine House of Representatives.

== Jurisdiction ==
As prescribed by House Rules, the committee's jurisdiction is on the amendments or revisions of the Constitution of the Philippines.

== Members, 20th Congress ==
Position	Member	Constituency	Party
Chairperson	Rufus Rodriguez	Cagayan de Oro–2nd	CDP
Vice Chairpersons	Vacant		
Members for the Majority	Vacant		
Members for the Minority	Vacant		

== Historical membership rosters ==
=== 18th Congress ===
Position	Members	Party	Province/City	District
Chairperson	Rufus Rodriguez	CDP	Cagayan de Oro	2nd
Vice Chairpersons	Antonio Albano	NUP	Isabela	1st
Vice Chairpersons	Vicente Veloso III	NUP	Leyte	3rd
Vice Chairpersons	Ron Salo	KABAYAN	Party-list	
Vice Chairpersons	Corazon Nuñez-Malanyaon	Nacionalista	Davao Oriental	1st
Vice Chairpersons	Xavier Jesus Romualdo	PDP–Laban	Camiguin	Lone
Vice Chairpersons	Lorenz Defensor	PDP–Laban	Iloilo	3rd
Members for the Majority	Jose Ong Jr.	NUP	Northern Samar	2nd
Members for the Majority	Raymond Democrito Mendoza	TUCP	Party-list	
Members for the Majority	Jose Tejada	Nacionalista	Cotabato	3rd
Members for the Majority	Alyssa Sheena Tan	PFP	Isabela	4th
Members for the Majority	Junie Cua	PDP–Laban	Quirino	Lone
Members for the Majority	Ruwel Peter Gonzaga	PDP–Laban	Davao de Oro	2nd
Members for the Majority	Alfredo Garbin Jr.	AKO BICOL	Party-list	
Members for the Majority	Gil Acosta	PPP	Palawan	3rd
Members for the Majority	Manuel Sagarbarria	NPC	Negros Oriental	2nd
Members for the Minority	Arnolfo Teves Jr.	PDP–Laban	Negros Oriental	3rd
Members for the Minority	Francisca Castro	ACT TEACHERS	Party-list	
Members for the Minority	Lawrence Lemuel Fortun	Nacionalista	Agusan del Norte	1st
Members for the Minority	Argel Joseph Cabatbat	MAGSASAKA	Party-list	
Members for the Minority	Ferdinand Gaite	Bayan Muna	Party-list	

== See also ==
- House of Representatives of the Philippines
- List of Philippine House of Representatives committees
- Constitutional reform in the Philippines
