= Constitutional amendment =

Formal change to the text of the constitution of an entity

A constitutional amendment (or constitutional alteration) is a modification of the constitution of a polity, organization or other type of entity. Amendments are often interwoven into the relevant sections of an existing constitution, directly altering the text. Conversely, they can be appended to the constitution as supplemental additions (codicils), thus changing the frame of government without altering the existing text of the document.

Most constitutions require that amendments be enacted through a special procedure that is more stringent than the process for passing ordinary legislation. Examples of such special procedures include supermajorities in the legislature, or direct approval by the electorate in a referendum, or even a combination of two or more different special procedures. A referendum to amend the constitution may also be triggered in some jurisdictions by popular initiative.

Australia and Ireland provide examples of constitutions requiring that all amendments are first passed by the legislature before being submitted to the people; in the case of Ireland, a simple majority of those voting at the electorate is all that is required, whereas a more complex set of criteria must be met in Australia (a majority of voters in a majority of states is also necessary). Switzerland has procedure similar to that of Australia.

The special procedures for the amendment of some constitutions have proven to be so exacting, that of proposed amendments either few (eight Amendments out of 44 proposed in Australia), or none (as in Japan) have been passed over a period of several decades. In contrast, the former constitution of the U.S. state of Alabama was amended 977 times between its adoption in 1901 and its replacement by the current constitution in 2022.

== Form of changes to the text ==
There are a number of formal differences, from one jurisdiction to another, in the manner in which constitutional amendments are both originally drafted and written down once they become law. In some jurisdictions, such as Ireland, Estonia, and Australia, constitutional amendments originate as bills and become laws in the form of acts of parliament. This may be the case notwithstanding the fact that a special procedure is required to bring an amendment into force. Thus, for example, in Ireland and Australia although amendments are drafted in the form of acts of Parliament they cannot become law until they have been approved in a referendum. By contrast, in the United States a proposed amendment originates as a special joint resolution of Congress that does not require the president to sign and that the president can not veto.

The manner in which constitutional amendments are finally recorded takes two main forms. In most jurisdictions, amendments to a constitution take the form of revisions to the previous text. Thus, once an amendment has become law, portions of the original text may be deleted or new articles may be inserted among existing ones. The second, less common method, is for amendments to be appended to the end of the main text in the form of special articles of amendment, leaving the body of the original text intact. Although the wording of the original text is not altered, the doctrine of implied repeal applies. In other words, in the event of conflict, an article of amendment will usually take precedence over the provisions of the original text, or of an earlier amendment. Nonetheless, there may still be ambiguity whether an amendment is intended to supersede or to supplement an existing article in the text.

An article of amendment may, however, explicitly express itself as having the effect of repealing a specific existing article. The use of appended articles of amendment is most famous as a feature of the United States Constitution, but it is also the method of amendment in a number of other jurisdictions, such as Venezuela.

Under the 1919 German Weimar Constitution, the prevailing legal theory was that any law reaching the necessary supermajorities in both chambers of parliament was free to deviate from the terms of the constitution, without itself becoming part of the constitution. This very wide conception of "amendment" eased the rise of Adolf Hitler to power; it was consequently explicitly ruled out in the postwar 1949 constitution, which allows amendments only by explicitly changing the constitution's text.

== Summary of methods ==
Table of amendment procedures
Constitution	Proposed by	Approval by	Referendum requirement	Majority or Supermajority	Entrenched clauses?
Afghanistan	President	Legislature	No	2/3	Yes
Albania	Legislature (1/5)	Legislature	Yes	2/3 + >50%	No
Algeria	President	Both houses of legislature + referendum (or Constitutional council + both houses of legislature)		>50% (or 3/4)	Yes
Andorra	Monarch	Legislature	Yes	2/3 + >50%	No
Andorra	Legislature (1/3)	Legislature	Yes	2/3 + >50%	No
Angola	President	Legislature		2/3	Yes
Angola	Legislature (1/3)	Legislature		2/3	Yes
Republic of Somaliland	Legislature (1/3)	Both houses of legislature	Yes	2/3 (>50% in upper house) + 2/3	No
Antigua and Barbuda		Both houses of legislature	Yes	2/3 (>50% in upper house) + 2/3	No
Argentina	Legislature (2/3)	Constitutional convention	No	2/3	No
Armenia	1/3 of Parliament, the Government, or 200,000 voters for certain amendments; 1/4 of Parliament, the Government, or 150,000 voters for others. Additional 300,000 voters overrides need for Parliament.	Legislature	Sometimes	2/3 (+ >50%).	Yes
Australia	Legislature (1 member)	Both houses of legislature (usually; see below)	Yes	>50% (absolute) in legislature + >50% (simple) nationally and in at least 4 of the 6 states and in any state where certain rights of that state are affected	No
Austria		Lower house (+ upper house in certain cases)	Sometimes (fundamental changes)	2/3 + (2/3)	No
Bahrain	Legislature (15 members)	Both houses of legislature (or joint session)	Yes	2/3 (or 2/3)	Yes
Bangladesh		Legislature	Yes	2/3	Yes
Belgium	Legislature (either house)	Legislature (before and after an election)	No	2/3	Yes (during a regency)
Brazil	President	Both houses of legislature	No	3/5	Yes
Brazil	Legislature (1/3 of either house)	Both houses of legislature	No	3/5	Yes
Brazil	Sub-national legislature (>50%)	Both houses of legislature	No	3/5	Yes
Bulgaria	President	Legislature (or constitutional convention for certain amendments)		3/4 or 2/3 in two sittings (2/3 for constitutional convention)	No
Bulgaria	Legislature (1/4)			2/3	
Cambodia	Monarch	Legislature	No	2/3	Yes
Cambodia	Prime Minister	Legislature	No	2/3	Yes
Cambodia	Legislature (1/4)	Legislature	No	2/3	Yes
Canada		Both houses of legislature + 2/3 of provincial legislatures representing majority of population	No	>50% + >50%	No
Chile	Legislature or President	Both houses of legislature	No	4/7	No
China	Legislature (Standing Committee)	Legislature	No	2/3	No
China	Legislature (1/5)	Legislature	No	2/3	No
China, Republic of	Legislature (1/4)	Legislature	Yes	3/4 + >50% of total electorate	No
Czech Republic		Both houses of legislature	No	3/5	Yes
Denmark		Legislature (before and after an election)	Yes	>50% + >50% (representing >40% of electorate)	No
Djibouti	President	Legislature (or legislature + referendum)	Yes	2/3 (or >50% + >50%)	Yes
Djibouti	Legislature (1/3)	Legislature (or legislature + referendum)	Yes	2/3 (or >50% + >50%)	Yes
Ecuador	President	Legislature (or Legislature + referendum)		2/3 (or >50% + >50%	Yes
Ecuador	Legislature (1/3)	Legislature (or Legislature + referendum)		2/3 (or >50% + >50%	Yes
Ecuador	Electorate (1%)	Legislature (or Legislature + referendum)		2/3 (or >50% + >50%	Yes
Estonia	President	Legislature with or without an election (or referendum)		>50% + 3/5 after an election or 4/5 without an election (or >50%)	No
Estonia	Legislature (1/5)	Legislature with or without an election (or referendum)		>50% + 3/5 after an election or 4/5 without an election (or >50%)	No
Ethiopia	Legislature (2/3 of either house)	Legislature in joint session + sub-national legislatures (or each house of legislature + sub-national legislature for certain sections)		2/3 + 2/3 (or 2/3 + 100%)	No
Ethiopia	Sub-national legislatures (1/3)	Legislature in joint session + sub-national legislatures (or each house of legislature + sub-national legislature for certain sections)		2/3 + 2/3 (or 2/3 + 100%)	No
Egypt	President	Lower house	Yes	2/3 + >50%	Yes
Egypt	Legislature (1/5 of lower house)	Lower house	Yes	2/3 + >50%	Yes
Fiji		Legislature	Yes	3/4 + 3/4	Yes
Finland	Government	Legislature before and after an election (or a proposal can be declared by 5/6 as "urgent" and can then be passed without an election)	No	>50% + 2/3 (or 5/6 + 2/3)	No
Finland	Legislature (1 member)	Legislature before and after an election (or a proposal can be declared by 5/6 as "urgent" and can then be passed without an election)	No	>50% + 2/3 (or 5/6 + 2/3)	No
France	President	Both houses of legislature (or legislature in joint session)	Yes	>50% + >50% (or 3/5)	No
France	Legislature (any legislator)	Both houses of legislature (or legislature in joint session)	Yes	>50% + >50% (or 3/5)	No
Gabon	President	Both houses of legislature + joint session (or referendum)	Sometimes	>50% + 2/3 (or >50%)	Yes
Gabon	Government	Both houses of legislature + joint session (or referendum)	Sometimes	>50% + 2/3 (or >50%)	Yes
Gabon	Legislature (1/3 of either house)	Both houses of legislature + joint session (or referendum)	Sometimes	>50% + 2/3 (or >50%)	Yes
Germany		Both houses of legislature		2/3	Yes
Greece	Legislature (50 legislators)	Legislature before and after an election		3/5 + >50% or >50% + 3/5	Yes
Haiti	Executive	Both houses of legislature + joint session after an election		2/3 + 2/3	Yes
Haiti	Legislature (Either house)	Both houses of legislature + joint session after an election		2/3 + 2/3	Yes
Honduras		Legislature		2/3	Yes
Hungary	President	Legislature		2/3	No
Hungary	Government	Legislature		2/3	No
Hungary	Legislature (1/5)	Legislature		2/3	No
Iceland		Legislature before and after an election	Sometimes (referendum if on status of the Church)	>50% (+ >50%)	No
India		Both houses of legislature (+ sub-national legislatures in some cases)		2/3 (+ 50%)	No
Indonesia	Legislature (1/3)	Joint session of legislature		>50%+1	Yes
Ireland		Both houses of legislature	Yes	>50% + >50%	No
Italy		Both houses of legislature (or both houses of legislature + referendum)	Sometimes	2/3 (or >50% + >50%)	Yes
Japan	Legislature (2/3)	Both houses of legislature	Yes	2/3 + >50%	No
Jordan		Both houses of legislature		2/3	Yes
Kazakhstan	President	Both houses of legislature (or referendum)		3/4 + >50% representing voters in 2/3 of the oblasts, major cities and the capital.	Yes
Korea, Democratic People's Republic of		Legislature		2/3	No
Laos		Legislature		2/3	No
Libya		Legislature		2/3	No
Madagascar	President	Both houses of legislature	Yes	3/4 + >50%	Yes
Madagascar	Legislature (2/3)	Both houses of legislature	Yes	3/4 + >50%	Yes
Malawi		Legislature (or referendum)		2/3 (or >50%)	No
Mexico		Legislature + sub-national legislatures		2/3 + >50%	No
Namibia		Both houses of legislature (or lower house + referendum)		2/3 (or 2/3 + 2/3)	Yes
The Netherlands	Legislature (lower house)	Both houses of legislature (before and after election)		50% before election, 2/3 after	No
North Macedonia	President	Legislature		2/3	No
North Macedonia	Government	Legislature		2/3	No
North Macedonia	Legislature (30 legislators)	Legislature		2/3	No
North Macedonia	Electorate (150,000 citizens)	Legislature		2/3	No
Pakistan	Legislature (either house)	Both houses of legislature		2/3	No
Palau	Legislature (3/4 of both houses)	Referendum	Yes	>50% in 3/4 of states	No
Palau	Electorate (25%)	Referendum	Yes	>50% in 3/4 of states	No
Palestine		Legislature		2/3	No
Philippines	Legislature (2/3)	Either of legislature or referendum.	Yes	>50%	No
Philippines	Constitutional convention	Either of legislature or referendum.	Yes	>50%	No
Philippines	Electorate (12% of voters representing at least 3% of every electoral district)	Either of legislature or referendum.	Yes	>50%	No
Poland	President	Both houses of legislature	Certain amendments e.g. about human rights, rule of law, democracy, equality, national symbols, future constitution amendment rules, require a referendum, but only when requested by 1/5 of the lower house of the parliament or by the president (or by the upper house but the upper house approval is required in the standard way anyway).	2/3 in lower house and >50% in upper house	No
Poland	Sejm (1/5)	Both houses of legislature	Certain amendments e.g. about human rights, rule of law, democracy, equality, national symbols, future constitution amendment rules, require a referendum, but only when requested by 1/5 of the lower house of the parliament or by the president (or by the upper house but the upper house approval is required in the standard way anyway).	2/3 in lower house and >50% in upper house	No
Poland	Senate	Both houses of legislature	Certain amendments e.g. about human rights, rule of law, democracy, equality, national symbols, future constitution amendment rules, require a referendum, but only when requested by 1/5 of the lower house of the parliament or by the president (or by the upper house but the upper house approval is required in the standard way anyway).	2/3 in lower house and >50% in upper house	No
Portugal	Legislature (Any legislator)	Legislature		2/3	Yes
Qatar	Monarch	Legislature		2/3	Yes
Qatar	Legislature (1/3)	Legislature		2/3	Yes
Romania	President	Both houses of legislature (or joint session)	Yes	2/3 (or 3/4) + >50%	Yes
Romania	Legislature (1/4 in either house)	Both houses of legislature (or joint session)	Yes	2/3 (or 3/4) + >50%	Yes
Romania	Electorate (500,000 voters)	Both houses of legislature (or joint session)	Yes	2/3 (or 3/4) + >50%	Yes
Russia	President	Sub-national legislatures (or, in some cases, legislature in joint session + constitutional convention or referendum)		2/3 (or 3/5 + 2/3 or >50%)	No
Russia	Government	Sub-national legislatures (or, in some cases, legislature in joint session + constitutional convention or referendum)		2/3 (or 3/5 + 2/3 or >50%)	No
Russia	Legislature (1/5 in either house)	Sub-national legislatures (or, in some cases, legislature in joint session + constitutional convention or referendum)		2/3 (or 3/5 + 2/3 or >50%)	No
Russia	Sub-national legislatures	Sub-national legislatures (or, in some cases, legislature in joint session + constitutional convention or referendum)		2/3 (or 3/5 + 2/3 or >50%)	No
Samoa		Legislature		2/3	
Sao Tome and Principe	Legislature (Any legislator)	Legislature		2/3	Yes
Senegal	President	Legislature (or referendum)		3/5 (or >50%)	Yes
Senegal	Legislature	Legislature (or referendum)		3/5 (or >50%)	Yes
Serbia	President	Legislature	Sometimes	2/3 (+ >50%)	No
Serbia	Government	Legislature	Sometimes	2/3 (+ >50%)	No
Serbia	Legislature (1/3)	Legislature	Sometimes	2/3 (+ >50%)	No
Serbia	Electorate (150,000 voters)	Legislature	Sometimes	2/3 (+ >50%)	No
Seychelles		Legislature + referendum	Yes	2/3 + >60%	No
Sierra Leone		Legislature	Sometimes	2/3 + 2/3 representing >50% of electorate	No
Singapore		Legislature		2/3	No
Slovakia		Legislature		3/5	No
Slovenia	Government	Legislature	Sometimes (referendum if demanded by 30 legislators)	2/3 (+ >50% out of >50% of electorate)	No
Slovenia	Legislature (20 legislators)	Legislature	Sometimes (referendum if demanded by 30 legislators)	2/3 (+ >50% out of >50% of electorate)	No
Slovenia	Electorate (20,000 voters)	Legislature	Sometimes (referendum if demanded by 30 legislators)	2/3 (+ >50% out of >50% of electorate)	No
Solomon Islands		Legislature		2/3 (3/4 in certain cases)	No
Somalia	Government	Both houses of legislature		2/3	Yes
Somalia	Government (members)	Both houses of legislature		2/3	Yes
Somalia	Legislature (Any legislator)	Both houses of legislature		2/3	Yes
Somalia	Electorate (40,000 citizens)	Both houses of legislature		2/3	Yes
Spain	Government	Both houses of legislature	Sometimes (referendum if demanded by 10% of either house of legislature)	3/5 (or >50% of upper house + 2/3 of lower house)	Yes
Spain	Legislature (Any legislator)	Both houses of legislature	Sometimes (referendum if demanded by 10% of either house of legislature)	3/5 (or >50% of upper house + 2/3 of lower house)	Yes
Sweden		Legislature before and after an election	Sometimes (referendum if demanded by 1/3 of legislature)	>50% + >50%	No
Tajikistan	President	Referendum	Yes	>50%	Yes
Tajikistan	Legislature (2/3)	Referendum	Yes	>50%	Yes
Tunisia	President	Legislature	Yes	2/3 + >50%	Yes
Tunisia	Legislature (1/3)	Legislature	Yes	2/3 + >50%	Yes
Turkey	Legislature (1/3)	Legislature	Yes	3/5 + >50%	Yes
Turkmenistan		Legislature (or referendum)		2/3 (or >50%)	Yes
Tuvalu		Legislature		2/3	No
Uganda		Legislature	Yes	2/3 + >50%	No
Ukraine	President	Legislature before an election + after an election	Sometimes	>50% + 2/3 (+ >50%)	Yes
Ukraine	Legislature (1/3)	Legislature before an election + after an election	Sometimes	>50% + 2/3 (+ >50%)	Yes
United Arab Emirates	Legislature	Legislature		2/3	No
United Kingdom	Legislature (Any legislator)	Legislature	No	Majority votes in House of Commons and House of Lords (or Commons only if Parliament Act invoked) with the consent of the monarch (although they are constitutionally required to grant consent)	No
United States	Legislature (2/3 of both houses)	State legislatures or ratification conventions	No	3/4	Yes
United States	Sub-national legislature (2/3)	State legislatures or ratification conventions	No	3/4	Yes
Uzbekistan		Both houses of legislature in joint session (or referendum)		2/3 (or >50%)	No
Vanuatu	Prime Minister	Legislature		2/3	No
Vanuatu	Legislature (Any legislator)	Legislature		2/3	No
Venezuela	President	Legislature	Yes	>50% + >50%	No
Venezuela	Legislature (39%)	Legislature	Yes	>50% + >50%	No
Venezuela	Electorate (15% of voters)	Legislature	Yes	>50% + >50%	No
Vietnam	President	Legislature		2/3	No
Vietnam	Legislature (Standing Committee)	Legislature		2/3	No
Vietnam	Legislature (2/3)	Legislature		2/3	No
Yemen	Prime Minister	Legislature	Sometimes	2/3 (+ >50%)	No
Yemen	Legislature (1/3 of lower house)	Legislature	Sometimes	2/3 (+ >50%)	No
Zambia		Legislature	Yes	2/3 + >50% of total electorate	No
Zimbabwe		Both houses of legislature	Sometimes	2/3 (+ >50%)	No

== Africa ==
=== Ethiopia ===
The Constitution of Ethiopia can only be modified by a two-thirds majority of the country's regions, and a two-thirds majority of a joint session of the Federal Parliamentary Assembly in accordance with Article 105. The constitution's Chapter Three (describing both Human and democratic rights) and the constitution's Articles 104 and 105 are almost unamendable since they require the total consensus of the federal regional states and two-thirds of each house of Parliament. In Ethiopia's federal experience, each regional state is equal and has the right to veto amendments to the aforementioned articles.

=== South Africa ===
The Constitution of South Africa can be amended by an Act of Parliament, but special procedures and requirements apply to the passage of constitutional amendments. A bill amending the Constitution must be introduced in the National Assembly, and cannot contain any provisions other than constitutional amendments and directly related matters.

At least 30 days before a constitutional amendment bill is introduced in the National Assembly, the person or committee introducing the amendment must publish it for public comment, submit it to the provincial legislatures, and, if it does not have to be passed by the National Council of Provinces (NCOP), submit it to the NCOP for debate. When the bill is introduced, the comments received must be tabled in the National Assembly, and in the NCOP when appropriate.

All amendments must be passed by an absolute two-thirds supermajority in the National Assembly (the lower house); as the Assembly has 400 members this requires 267 members to vote for the amendment. Most amendments do not have to be considered by the NCOP (the upper house). Amendments of the Bill of Rights, and amendments affecting the role of the NCOP, the "boundaries, powers, functions or institutions" of the provinces or provisions "dealing specifically with provincial matters" must also be passed by the NCOP with a supermajority of at least six of the nine provinces. If an amendment affects a specific province, it must also be approved by the legislature of the province concerned. Section 1, which defines South Africa as "one, sovereign, democratic state" and lists its founding values, is a specially entrenched clause and can only be amended by an absolute three-quarters supermajority in the National Assembly and six of the provinces in the NCOP.

Once an Act is passed by the National Assembly, and by the NCOP if necessary, it must be signed and assented to by the President. As with any other Act of Parliament, by default an amendment comes into effect when it is published in the Government Gazette, but the text of the amendment may specify some other date of commencement, or allow the President to specify one by notice in the Gazette.

== Americas ==
=== Brazil ===
The Constitution of Brazil states various terms on how it can be amended. Article 60 lies within "Section VIII: The Legislative Process, Subsection 2: Amendments to the Constitution". The following is detailed therein:

Constitutional amendments may be proposed by:

I. at least one-third of the members of the Chamber of Deputies or the Federal Senate;
II. the President of the Republic;
III. more than one-half of the Legislative Assemblies of units of the Federation, each manifesting its decision by a simple majority of its members.

§1°. The Constitution cannot be amended during a federal intervention, state of defence or stage of siege.
§2°. A proposed amendment shall be debated and voted on in each Chamber of the National Congress, in two rounds, and shall be considered approved if it obtains three-fifths of the votes of the respective members in both rounds.
§3°. A Constitutional amendment shall be promulgated by the Executive Committees of the Chamber of Deputies and Federal Senate, taking the next sequential number.
§4°. No proposed constitutional amendment shall be considered that is aimed at abolishing the following:

I. the federalist form of the National Government;
II. direct, secret, universal and periodic suffrage;
III. separation of powers;
IV. individual rights and guarantees.

§5°. The subject of a defeated or prejudiced proposed Constitutional amendment may not be made the subject of another proposed amendment in the same legislative session.

Article 60 is the only article prescribed under Subsection 2 of Section 8 in the Brazilian constitution.

=== United States ===
==== Federal constitution ====
Article Five of the United States Constitution describes the process whereby the federal Constitution may be altered. Twenty-seven amendments have been added (appended as codicils) to the Constitution.

Amendment proposals may be adopted and sent to the states for ratification by either:

- A two-thirds (supermajority) vote of members present—if a quorum exists—in both the Senate and the House of Representatives of the United States Congress; or
- A majority vote of state delegations at a national convention called by Congress at the request of the legislatures of at least two-thirds (at present 34) of the states. (This method has never been used.)

All 33 amendment proposals that have been sent to the states for ratification since the establishment of the Constitution have come into being via the Congress. State legislatures have however, at various times, used their power to apply for a national convention in order to pressure Congress into proposing a desired amendment. For example, the movement to amend the Constitution to provide for the direct election of senators began to see such proposals regularly pass the House of Representatives only to die in the Senate from the early 1890s onward. As time went by, more and more state legislatures adopted resolutions demanding that a convention be called, thus pressuring the Senate to finally relent and approve what later became the Seventeenth Amendment for fear that such a convention—if permitted to assemble—might stray to include issues above and beyond just the direct election of senators.

To become an operative part of the Constitution, an amendment, whether proposed by Congress or a national constitutional convention, must be ratified by either:

- The legislatures of three-fourths (at present 38) of the states; or
- State ratifying conventions in three-fourths (at present 38) of the states.

Congress has specified the state legislature ratification method for all but one amendment. The ratifying convention method was used for the Twenty-first Amendment, which became part of the Constitution in 1933.

Since the turn of the 20th century, amendment proposals sent to the states for ratification have generally contained a seven-year ratification deadline, either in the body of the amendment or in the resolving clause of the joint resolution proposing it. The Constitution does not expressly provide for a deadline on the state legislatures' or state ratifying conventions' consideration of proposed amendments. In Dillon v. Gloss (1921), the Supreme Court affirmed that Congress—if it so desires—could provide a deadline for ratification. An amendment with an attached deadline that is not ratified by the required number of states within the set time period is considered inoperative and rendered moot.

A proposed amendment becomes an official Article of the Constitution immediately once it is ratified by three-fourths of the States. The Article usually goes into force at this time too, though it may self-impose a delay before that happens, as was the case of the Eighteenth Amendment. Every ratified Amendment has been certified or proclaimed by an official of the federal government, starting with the Secretary of State, then the Administrator of General Services, and now the Archivist of the United States, with the Archivist currently being responsible for certification under 1 U.S.C. § 106b. The certification document usually contains a list of the States that ratified the Amendment. This certification is just used by the federal government to keep an official record and archive of the Amendment for its own purposes, and does not actually have any legal effect on the Amendment.

==== State constitutions ====
State constitutions in the U.S. are amended on a regular basis. In 19 states, the state constitutions have been amended at least 100 times.

Amendments are often necessary because of the length of state constitutions, which are, on average, three times longer than the federal constitution, and because state constitutions typically contain extensive detail. In addition, state constitutions are often easier to amend than the federal constitution.

Individual states differ in the difficulty of constitutional amendments. Some states allow for initiating the amendment process through the action of the state legislature or by popular initiative.

===== California =====
There are three methods for proposing an amendment to the California State Constitution: by the legislature, by constitutional convention, or by voter initiative. A proposed amendment must be approved by a majority of voters.

With the legislative method, a proposed amendment must be approved by an absolute supermajority of two-thirds of the membership of each house.

With the convention method, the legislature may, by a two-thirds absolute supermajority, submit to the voters at a general election the question whether to call a convention to revise the Constitution. If the majority of the voters vote yes on that question, within six months the Legislature shall provide for the convention. Delegates to a constitutional convention shall be voters elected from districts as nearly equal in population as may be practicable. The constitution does not provide any rules for the operation of the constitutional convention.

With the initiative method, an amendment is proposed by a petition signed by voters equal in number to 8% of the votes for all candidates for governor at the last gubernatorial election. The proposed amendment is then submitted to the voters at a general or special election.

===== New York =====
There are two methods of proposing amendments to the New York Constitution. All proposed amendments must be approved by a majority of voters in a referendum.

With the legislative method, an amendment proposal must be published for three months, then approved by an absolute majority of the members of each of the two houses, and approved again in a succeeding term of the houses, with an election intervening. Finally, the amendment proposal must be submitted to the people, and for ratification must be approved by a simple majority.

With the convention method, a constitutional convention must be convened by a majority vote of voters in a general election (referendum) on the question.

===== Tennessee =====
There are two methods for proposing amendments to the Tennessee State Constitution: through the legislature and by constitutional convention. Proposed amendments must be approved by a majority of voters in a referendum.

With the legislative method, the Tennessee General Assembly passes a resolution calling for an amendment and stating its wording. This must pass in three separate readings on three separate days, with an absolute majority on all readings. It does not require the governor's approval. It must then be published at least six months before the next legislative election in newspapers of wide and general circulation. (This is done by precedent but is not required by law.) After the election, the proposed amendment must go through the same procedure (absolute majority on three separate readings). Then it is put on the ballot as a referendum in the next gubernatorial election. To be ratified it must again achieve an absolute majority of those voting in the gubernatorial election.

With the convention method, the legislature can put on any ballot the question of whether to call a constitutional convention. It must be stated whether the convention is limited or unlimited—that is, whether it can only amend the current constitution or totally abolish it and write a new one. If limited, the call must state which provisions of the current constitution are to be subject to amendment, and the subsequent convention, if approved, is limited to considering only amendments to the provisions specified in the call. The proposed amendments must then be submitted to the electorate and approved by a majority of those voting in the election. A constitutional convention cannot be held more frequently than once every six years.

===== Texas =====
The only method for proposing an amendment to the Texas State Constitution is through the legislature, either in regular or special session. The governor may call a special session, and specify the agenda for the session. To become part of the constitution, proposed amendments must be approved by a majority of voters in a referendum. Texas has had six different constitutions and the current constitution, adopted in 1876, has been amended 474 times.

A proposed amendment must be approved by an absolute supermajority of two-thirds of the elected membership of each house of the legislature. It is submitted to the voters in an election specified by the legislature. The wording of an explanatory statement that will appear on the ballot must be approved by the Texas Attorney General and printed in newspapers. The full text of the amendment must be posted by all county clerks for 30 days before the election.

===== Washington =====
The only method for proposing an amendment to the Washington State Constitution is through the legislature and can originate in either branch. The proposal must be approved by a two-thirds majority of the legislature. The proposed amendment is placed on the ballot at the next general election and must be approved by a majority of the voters.

== Asia and Oceania ==
=== Australia ===
The procedure for amending the Constitution of Australia is detailed in section 128 of the Constitution. Firstly, a bill amending the Constitution must be passed by both houses of the Parliament of Australia by an absolute majority (at least 76 of the 151 members of the House of Representatives and at least 39 of the 76 members of the Senate). If one house passes the bill while the other refuses, it may attempt to pass the bill again. If the second house again refuses to pass it, the Governor-General (presumably on the advice of the Prime Minister) may still submit the proposed change for referendum.

Following this, Australians then vote on the proposal. For a referendum to succeed both of the following must be achieved

1. A majority of states (New South Wales, Victoria, Queensland, Western Australia, South Australia and Tasmania) must agree to the proposal.
2. A majority of the combined votes of all of Australia must agree to the proposal.

The double majority is a major factor in why since 1906 out of 44 referendums only 8 have been successful.

=== China ===
In the Communist Party-ruled People's Republic of China, the Constitution of China states how to be amended under Article 64 of "Chapter III: The Structure of the State". It says the following:

Amendments to the Constitution are to be proposed by the Standing Committee of the National People's Congress or by more than one-fifth of the deputies to the National People's Congress and adopted by a majority vote of more than two-thirds of all the deputies to the Congress.

=== India ===
The Indian constitution can be amended in 3 ways:

1. By Simple Majority of the Parliament
  - This method is used to amend those parts of the constitution outside the purview of Article 368 of the constitution.
  - It is used in amending the following provisions:
    - Formation of new states, alteration of boundaries of states, changing names of states and alteration of areas of states
    - Creation/Abolition of Legislative Councils in states
    - Changing salaries and allowances of judges of Supreme Court and High Court
    - Laws regarding citizenship
2. Through procedure mentioned in Article 368 of the Constitution
  - This again is done in 2 ways -
    - By Special Majority of the Parliament
      - Special majority implies :
        - A majority of the 'total membership' of the Parliament (i.e., each houses separately) and
        - A majority of 2/3rd of members present and voting
    - By Special Majority of the Parliament and consent of states
      - This requires
        - Special majority in each house of the Parliament and
        - Consent of half of the state legislatures
      - This method is used for amending those provisions affecting states' interests. e.g.: Representation of states in Parliament, distribution of legislative powers between the union and states etc.

Since its commencement in 1950, Indian constitution has been amended 106 times, as of August 2021. Supreme Court in Kesavananda Bharati Case held that parliament's power to amend is not unlimited, and it can not amend the basic structure of the constitution. The 'basic structure' includes the supremacy of the Constitution, the rule of law, Independence of the judiciary, doctrine of separation of powers, federalism, secularism, sovereign democratic republic, the parliamentary system of government, the principle of free and fair elections, welfare state, etc.

=== Indonesia ===
The Constitution of Indonesia states that it can be amended corresponding to Article 37 of "Chapter XVI: Constitutional Amendments" within the document. Proposal to amend the constitution must submitted by one-thirds members of the People's Consultative Assembly. Two-thirds of the members of the People's Consultative Assembly must be present: any proposed amendment requires a simple majority of the entire People's Consultative Assembly membership. The form of the unitary state cannot be changed.

=== Japan ===
The Constitution of Japan states that it can be amended corresponding to Article 96 of "Chapter IX: Amendments" within the document. It says the following:

Amendments to this Constitution shall be initiated by the Diet, through a concurring vote of two-thirds or more of all the members of each House and shall thereupon be submitted to the people for ratification, which shall require the affirmative vote of a majority of all votes cast thereon, at a special referendum or at such election as the Diet shall specify.

Amendments when so ratified shall immediately be promulgated by the Emperor in the name of the people, as an integral part of this Constitution.

Japan has used this Constitution since Saturday, 3 May 1947. It was adopted and implemented as the most quintessential doctrine of Japanese governance following the Second World War and the Sino-Japanese war. As a result, in order to ensure that Japan would not be a source of future aggression, a special portion was written into the document in the form of "Article 9: Renunciation of War". It describes as follows:

Aspiring sincerely to an international peace based on justice and order, the Japanese people forever renounce war as a sovereign right of the nation and the threat or use of force as means of settling international disputes.

In order to accomplish the aim of the preceding paragraph, land, sea, and air forces, as well as other war potential, will never be maintained. The right of belligerency of the state will not be recognized.

Even though these two paragraphs are not expressly protected by an eternity clause, many Japanese people argue that it needs to be interpreted as being irrevocable due to the significant and precise nature of the article.

=== Philippines ===
Under the common interpretation of the Constitution, amendments can be proposed by one of three methods: a People's Initiative, a Constituent Assembly or a Constitutional Convention.

=== Taiwan ===
Article 174 of the Constitution of the Republic of China is codified with the law:

Amendments to the Constitution shall be made in accordance with one of the following procedures:

1. Upon the proposal of one-fifth of the total number of the delegates to the National Assembly and by a resolution of three-fourths of the delegates present at a meeting having a quorum of two-thirds of the entire Assembly, the Constitution may be amended.

2. Upon the proposal of one-fourth of the Members of the Legislative Yuan and by a resolution of three-fourths of the Members present at a meeting having a quorum of three-fourths of the Members of the Yuan, an amendment may be drawn up and submitted to the National Assembly by way of referendum. Such a proposed amendment to the Constitution shall be publicly published half a year before the National Assembly convenes.

This was changed beginning in the 1990s and Article 12 of the constitutional amendments must be approved by Taiwan's parliament and referendums voted by the citizens residing in the ROC free area.

=== Turkey ===
The Constitution of Turkey details, through Provisional Article 175 under "I. Amending the Constitution, participation in elections and referenda" of "Part Seven: Final Provisions"

Amendment to the Constitution shall be proposed in writing by at least one-third of the total number of members of the Grand National Assembly of Turkey. Bills to amend the Constitution shall be debated twice in the Plenary. The adoption of a bill for an amendment shall require a three-fifths majority of the total number of members of the Assembly by secret ballot.

The consideration and adoption of bills for the amendments to the Constitution shall be subject to the provisions governing the consideration and adoption of laws, with the exception of the conditions set forth in this Article.

The President of the Republic may send back the laws on the amendments to the Constitution to the Grand National Assembly of Turkey for reconsideration. If the Assembly readopts, by a two-thirds majority of the total number of members, the law sent back by the President of the Republic without any amendment, the President of the Republic may submit the law to referendum.

If a law on the amendment to the Constitution is adopted by a three-fifths or less than two-thirds majority of the total number of members of the Assembly and is not sent back by the President of the Republic to the Assembly for reconsideration, it shall be published in the Official Gazette and be submitted to referendum.

A law on the Constitutional amendment adopted by a two- thirds majority of the total number of members of the Grand National Assembly of Turkey directly or upon the sending back of the law by the President of the Republic or its articles deemed necessary may be submitted to a referendum by the President of the Republic. A law on the amendment to the Constitution or the related articles that are not submitted to referendum shall be published in the Official Gazette.

Entry into force of the laws on the amendment to the Constitution submitted to referendum shall require the affirmative vote of more than half of the valid votes cast.

The Grand National Assembly of Turkey, in adopting the law on the Constitutional amendment shall also decide on which provisions shall be submitted to referendum together and which shall be submitted individually, in case the law is submitted to referendum.

Every measure including fines shall be taken by law to secure participation in referenda, general elections, by-elections and local elections.

The Turkish constitution was adopted and implemented in 1982. As of July 2018, it had been amended 21 times. Every amendment which has been approved into the document was passed by the people through a constitutional referendum that occurred in 2017. This means that all twenty-one amendments were added at the same time. Due to the contents that it would exponentially extend presidential tenure as well as controversies about electoral misconduct, the referendum was intensely controversial. Global attention was drawn to it both before and after the results were finalized for the same reasons.

== Europe ==
=== European Union ===
The Treaties of the European Union are a set of international treaties between member states that describe the constitutional basis of the European Union. Prior to the Treaty of Lisbon's entry into force in 2009, there was only one procedure for the revision of the treaties on which the EU is based: the convening of an intergovernmental conference. Since 2009, Article 48 of the Treaty on European Union has laid down two procedures for the revision of the treaties.

- Ordinary revision: this relates to key changes in relation to the competences of the EU and requires the convening of an intergovernmental conference to adopt proposals for amendments by consensus. All EU countries have to ratify the treaty amendments for them to enter into force.
- Simplified revision: where the proposed amendments relate to the EU's policies and its internal actions, the European Council unanimously adopts a decision on the amendments having consulted the commission, the Parliament and the European Central Bank (if the amendment concerns monetary matters). The new treaty provisions only enter into force following their ratification by all EU countries according to their own constitutional procedures.

=== Albania ===
The Constitution of Albania states its terms for being amending under Article 177 within "Part 17: Amending The Constitution".

1. An initiative for amending the Constitution may be taken by not less than one-fifth of the members of the Assembly.

2. No amendment to the Constitution may take place when extraordinary measures are in effect.

3. A proposed amendment is approved by not less than two-thirds of all members of the Assembly.

4. The Assembly may decide, by two-thirds of all its members, that the proposed constitutional amendments be voted on in a referendum. The proposed constitutional amendment becomes effective after ratification by referendum, which takes place not later than 60 days after its approval by the Assembly.

5. An approved constitutional amendment is submitted to referendum when one-fifth of the members of the Assembly request it.

6. The President of the Republic cannot return for re-consideration a constitutional amendment approved by the Assembly.

7. An amendment approved by referendum is promulgated by the President of the Republic and becomes effective on the date provided for in it.

8. An amendment of the Constitution cannot be made unless a year has passed since the rejection by the Assembly of a proposed amendment on the same issue or three years have passed from its rejection by referendum.

Article 177 is the only article under this part of the Albanian constitution.

=== Austria ===
The Constitution of Austria is unusually liberal in terms of constitutional amendments. Any piece of parliamentary legislation can be designated as "constitutional law", i.e., as a part of the constitution if the required supermajority and other formalities for an amendment are met. An amendment may take the form of a change of the Bundes-Verfassungsgesetz, the centerpiece of the constitution, a change to another constitutional act, a new constitutional act, or of a section of constitutional law in a non-constitutional act. Furthermore, international treaties can be enacted as constitutional law, as happened in the case of the European Convention of Human Rights. Over the decades, frequent amendments and, in some cases, the intention to immunize pieces of legislation from judicial review, have led to much "constitutional garbage" consisting of hundreds of constitutional provisions spread all over the legal system. This has led to calls for reform.

A majority of two-thirds in the National Council is all that is required for an amendment to take effect. Only in the case of a fundamental change (Gesamtänderung) of the constitution a confirmation by referendum is required. Since 1945, this has only happened once when Austria's accession to the European Union was approved by popular vote.

If a constitutional amendment limits the powers of the states, a two-thirds majority in the Federal Council of Austria is required as well. Depending on the matter on hand, two-thirds of the Federal Councilors present (attendance of one-half of all Councilors is required), or two-thirds of all Federal Councilors must approve. If the amendment would change articles 34 or 35, the majority of councilors of at least four of the nine states is an additional requirement.

=== Belgium ===
The Constitution of Belgium can be amended by the federal legislative power, which consists of the King (in practice, the Federal Government) and the Federal Parliament. In order to amend the Constitution, the federal legislative power must declare the reasons to revise the Constitution in accordance with Article 195. This is done by means of two so-called Declarations of Revision of the Constitution, one adopted by the Chamber of Representatives and the Senate, and one signed by the King and the Federal Government.

Following this declaration, the Federal Parliament is automatically dissolved and a new federal election must take place. This makes it impossible to amend the Constitution unless an election has intervened. Following the election, the new Federal Parliament can amend those articles that have been declared revisable. Neither Chamber can consider amendments to the Constitution unless at least two-thirds of its members are present and the Constitution can only be amended if at least two-thirds of the votes cast are in favour of the amendment.

=== Bosnia and Herzegovina ===
In the Article X, defining the amendment procedure, the Constitution of Bosnia and Herzegovina states that it can be amended by a decision of the Parliamentary Assembly, including a two-thirds majority of those present and voting in the House of Representatives. The Constitution does not say who has the right, and under what rules, to present the amendments to the Parliamentary Assembly. Also, in the paragraph 2 of the Article X, the Constitution states that the rights and freedoms, as seen in the Article II, cannot be derogated, as well as the paragraph 2 itself.

The Constitution of Bosnia and Herzegovina was amended once, in 2009, to include the outcome of the Brcko District final award. Several constitutional reforms were attempted between 2006 and 2014, to ensure its compliance with the case law of the European Convention on Human Rights in the Sejdić and Finci v. Bosnia and Herzegovina and following cases (Zornic, Pilav) regarding ethnic- and residence-based discrimination in passive electoral rights for the Presidency and House of Peoples.

=== Bulgaria ===
Under the current Constitution of Bulgaria (1991), there are two procedures for amendment, depending on the part of the constitution to be amended:

- Normal amendment procedure (Articles 153–156): the Parliament can amend the Constitution for minor issues with a three-quarters majority, or two-thirds majority upon reintroduction in parliament after two months. This shall be done in three successive readings.
- Special amendment procedure (Articles 157–163): this procedure is the only way to revise the international borders of Bulgaria; change the form of government in the country; change the form in which the Constitution and international treaties are applied in Bulgaria (Article 5) or suspend citizens' rights. When such amendment is needed, the Constitution envisages an election for Great National Assembly, which consists of 400 deputies, with 200 elected by proportional vote and 200 elected by the first-past-the-post method. Then the amendments to the Constitution are passed by two-thirds majority in three successive readings.

=== Czech Republic ===
Passage of a constitutional act in the Czech Republic can only be accomplished through the agreement of three-fifths of all Deputies and Senators present at the time the proposed act is laid before each house of Parliament. It is the only type of legislation that does not require the signature of the President to become law. Furthermore, it is the only type of legislation the President cannot veto.

=== Denmark ===
The Constitution of Denmark provides an example of multiple special procedures that must be followed. After an amendment has been approved by parliament, a general election must be held; the new parliament must then approve the amendment again before it is finally submitted to a referendum. There is also a requirement that at least forty percent of eligible voters must vote at the referendum in order for an amendment to be validly passed.

=== Estonia ===
The Constitution of Estonia can only be modified by three-fifths majority in two successive complements of Parliament, and a referendum for certain chapters.

=== Finland ===
Amendments or revisions to the Constitution of Finland (including replacement) can be proposed by the Government or by any member of Parliament. These must first be approved by a majority of Parliament, and then after a parliamentary election by a two-thirds supermajority.

A proposal can be declared by a five-sixths supermajority of Parliament as “urgent,” after this it can be approved by two-thirds immediately – without an election. This second procedure is also used for emergency laws that temporarily deviate the Constitution.

=== France ===
Amendments to the Constitution of France must first be passed by both houses with identical terms, and then need approval either by a simple majority in a referendum or by a three-fifths majority of the two houses of the French parliament jointly convened in Congress.

=== Germany ===
The Federal Republic of Germany uses a basic law as its constitution. The Basic Law for the Federal Republic of Germany states its terms for amending under Article 79 of the document.

This Basic Law may be amended only by a law expressly amending or supplementing its text. In the case of an international treaty regarding a peace settlement, the preparation of a peace settlement, or the phasing out of an occupation regime, or designed to promote the defense of the Federal Republic, it shall be sufficient, for the purpose of making clear that the provisions of this Basic Law do not preclude the conclusion and entry into force of the treaty, to add language to the Basic Law that merely makes this clarification.

Any such law shall be carried by two thirds of the Members of the Bundestag and two thirds of the votes of the Bundesrat.

Amendments to this Basic Law affecting the division of the Federation into Länder, their participation on principle in the legislative process, or the principles laid down in Articles 1 and 20 shall be inadmissible.

The third paragraph was made by its framers to protect the country against a future totalitarian regime such as that of Nazi Germany. This is an example of the eternity clause in constitutional designing.

=== Greece ===
The Constitution of Greece is amendable through the terms which mentioned under Article 110 beneath "Section II: Revision of the Constitution" of "Part Four: Special, Final, and Transitional Provisions".

=== Ireland ===
The Constitution of Ireland can only be modified by referendum, following proposal approved by the lower and upper houses of the Oireachtas, amongst citizens entitled to vote for the President. The amendment succeeds by simple majority, and no quorum is required.

=== Italy ===
Article 138 of the Constitution provides for the special procedure through which the Parliament can adopt constitutional laws (including laws to amend the Constitution of Italy). Constitutional laws start by following the ordinary legislative procedure, which requires both houses of parliament to approve the law in the same text, with a simple majority (i.e. the majority of votes cast). However, after having been approved for the first time, they need to be voted for by both houses a second time, which can happen no sooner than three months after the first. In this second reading, no new amendments to the bill may be proposed: the bill must be either approved or rejected in its entirety.

The constitutional law needs to be approved by at least a majority of MPs in each house (absolute majority) in its second reading. Depending on the results of this second vote, the constitutional law may then follow two different paths.

- If the bill is approved by a qualified majority of two-thirds of members in each house, it can be immediately promulgated by the President of the Republic and become law.
- If the bill is approved by a majority of members in each house, but not enough to reach the qualified majority of two-thirds, it does not immediately become law. Instead, it must be first be published in the Official Gazette (the official journal where all Italian laws are published). Within three months after its publication, a constitutional referendum may be requested by either 500,000 voters, five regional councils, or one-fifth of the members of a house of parliament. If no constitutional referendum has been requested after the three months have elapsed, the bill can be promulgated and becomes law. If a constitutional referendum is requested, in order to become law the bill must be approved by a majority of votes cast by the whole electorate. No quorum is required, meaning that the referendum turnout has no effect on its validity (unlike in other forms of referendums in Italy).

The form of republic may not be revised (art. 139 of the Constitution).

Only five constitutional referendums have ever been held in Italy: in 2001 and 2020 (in which the constitutional laws were approved), and in 2006, 2016 and 2026 (in which they were rejected).

=== The Netherlands ===
To change the Constitution of the Netherlands the legislature must pass a law by simple majority proposing to change the constitution (voorstelwet, lit. proposed law). The lower house must then be dissolved and after elections the proposal is considered again. To actually change the constitution the change must be passed by 2/3 majority in both houses of parliament.

=== Poland ===
The Constitution of Poland says the following under Article 235 of "Chapter XII: Amending the Constitution" within it:

1. A bill to amend the Constitution may be submitted by the following: at least one-fifth of the statutory number of Deputies; the Senate; or the President of the Republic.

2. Amendments to the Constitution shall be made by means of a statute adopted by the Sejm and, thereafter, adopted in the same wording by the Senate within a period of 60 days.

3. The first reading of a bill to amend the Constitution may take place no sooner than 30 days after the submission of the bill to the Sejm.

4. A bill to amend the Constitution shall be adopted by the Sejm by a majority of at least two-thirds of votes in the presence of at least half of the statutory number of Deputies, and by the Senate by an absolute majority of votes in the presence of at least half of the statutory number of Senators.

5. The adoption by the Sejm of a bill amending the provisions of Chapters I, II or XII of the Constitution shall take place no sooner than 60 days after the first reading of the bill.

6. If a bill to amend the Constitution relates to the provisions of Chapters I, II or XII, the subjects specified in para. 1 above may require, within 45 days of the adoption of the bill by the Senate, the holding of confirmatory referendum. Such subjects shall make application in the matter to the Marshal of the Sejm, who shall order the holding of a referendum within 60 days of the day of receipt of the application. The amendment to the Constitution shall be deemed accepted if the majority of those voting express support for such amendment.

7. After conclusion of the procedures specified in paras 4 and 6 above, the Marshal of the Sejm shall submit the adopted statute to the President of the Republic for signature. The President of the Republic shall sign the statute within 21 days of its submission and order its promulgation in the Journal of Laws of the Republic of Poland (Dziennik Ustaw).

=== Portugal ===
The Constitution is amendable through the terms prescribed under "Title II: Revision of the Constitution" of "Part IX: Guaranteeing and Revision of the Constitution" between Articles 284 and 289.

=== Romania ===
The Constitution of Romania mentions and outlines the terms by which it can be amended in "Article 150: Amendment Initiative", "Article 151: Amendment Procedure", and "Article 152: Limits to Constitutional Amendments". All three articles are written under "Title VII: Amendment of the Constitution" of the document.

=== Russia ===
The Constitution of Russia was created by the Russian Federation in 1993. It can be amended in correspondence with Articles 134 through 137 of "Chapter 9: Constitutional Amendments and Revision of the Constitution" under the document. In 2008, certain amendments were proposed which extended the terms of the President of the Russian Federation and State Duma members from four to six years and four to five years in duration respectively. These constitutional amendments are the first truly substantial amendments to the country's constitution added into the Russian constitution fifteen years prior to its adoption and implementation fifteen years earlier.

=== Serbia ===
The Constitution of Serbia states its terms for being amended between Articles 203 to 205 under "Part 9: Amending The Constitution" within the document. The parts of the Constitution related to the judiciary were amended in 2022.

=== Spain ===
The Constitution of Spain can be amended through the procedures detailed between Articles 166 to 169 under "Part X: Constitutional Amendment" of the document. Additional details are provided between Sections 71 to 76 within the document as well.

=== Sweden ===
The Swedish Constitution consists of four fundamental laws: the Instrument of Government, the Act of Succession, the Freedom of the Press Act, and the Fundamental Law on Freedom of Expression.

The Instrument of Government, under "Chapter 8. Acts of law and other provisions", articles 14 to 17, states that in order to amend the fundamental laws, the Riksdag must take two identical decisions, and that these decisions must be separated by a general election. At least nine months shall elapse between the first submission of the amendment proposal and the date of the election, unless an exception is granted by the Committee on the Constitution with a majority of five sixths of its members.

One third of members of the Riksdag can also call for a binding referendum on a draft constitutional measure which already passed the first vote.

=== United Kingdom ===
In the United Kingdom, devoid of a codified constitution and exercising pure parliamentary sovereignty, the final authority on all quasi-constitutional matters is ultimately Parliament itself (the legislature), by a simple majority. This means that when the legislature wishes to make changes to constitutional matters (i.e. relating to the machinery of government), there can be no entrenchment clause or special procedure which can stand in its way.

Although consideration must be given to the Human Rights Act 1998 (HRA) which supersedes all other legislation, that act can itself be amended or repealed by a simple majority of Parliament. Alternatively, Parliament may bypass the HRA by passing primary legislation that contains a notwithstanding clause disapplying the HRA, or particular provisions of it, in relation to that legislation. An example of the latter is demonstrated in section 3 of the Safety of Rwanda (Asylum and Immigration) Act 2024.

Despite clauses such as those in the Scotland Act 2016, which proclaims that Scotland's devolved government cannot be abolished except by a referendum, legal commentators have noted that the Parliament of the United Kingdom may set aside such a requirement by a simple majority. Such purported entrenchment clauses are thus little more than expressions of hope and sentiment on the part of a parliament.

A similar situation could be found in the Fixed-term Parliaments Act 2011 (FTPA), which, prior to its repeal by the Dissolution and Calling of Parliament Act 2022, purported to restrict the ability of a Prime Minister on a whim to dissolve Parliament and hold a general election, as was formerly the case before the enactment of FTPA and is the case again since its repeal. In 2019, this requirement was annulled by simple majority through the passing of the Early Parliamentary General Election Act 2019, allowing a snap election to be held.

This power of Parliament may be seen by some as a weakness of entrenchment clauses in the British system, but others contend it represents an unbridled democratic power of the electorate to effect rapid and dramatic change. Thus in the British system no parliament can bind its successor, it cannot pass an effective entrenchment clause seeking to tie the hand of future governments.

== Inadmissible amendments ==
Some constitutions use entrenched clauses to restrict the kind of amendment to which they may be subject. This is usually to protect characteristics of the state considered sacrosanct, such as the democratic form of government or the protection of human rights. Amendments are often totally forbidden during a state of emergency or martial law.

- Under Article 79 (3) of the German Basic Law, modification of the federal nature of the country, or abolition or alteration of Article 1 (human dignity, human rights, immediate applicability of fundamental rights as law) or Article 20 (democracy, republicanism, rule of law, social nature of the state) is forbidden. This is in order to prevent a recurrence of events such as the Nazi Gleichschaltung, when Hitler used formally legal constitutional law to de facto abolish the constitution.
- Article 139 of the Constitution of Italy states that "the republican form cannot be subject to constitutional revision".
- Article 4 of the Constitution of Turkey states that the "provision of Article 1 of the Constitution establishing the form of the state as a Republic, the provisions in Article 2 on the characteristics of the Republic, and the provision of Article 3 shall not be amended, nor shall their amendment be proposed".
- Article Five of the United States Constitution, ratified in 1788, prohibited any amendments before 1808 which would affect the foreign slave trade, the tax on the slave trade, or the direct taxation provisions of the constitution. The foreign slave trade was outlawed by an act of Congress rather than by a constitutional amendment shortly after this clause expired in 1808. Also, any amendment affecting the equal representation of states in the Senate must be approved by every State. If the Corwin Amendment had passed, any future amendment to the Constitution "interfering with the domestic institutions of the state" (e.g., slavery) would have been banned.
- Chapter 6, Article 120, section c of the Constitution of Bahrain prohibits "an amendment to Article 2 [State Religion, Shari'a, Official Language] of this Constitution, and it is not permissible under any circumstances to propose the amendment of the constitutional monarchy and the principle of inherited rule in Bahrain, as well as the bicameral system and the principles of freedom and equality established in this Constitution".
- Article 121 of the Constitution of Norway provides that amendments must not "contradict the principles embodied in this Constitution, but solely relate to modifications of particular provisions which do not alter the spirit of the Constitution".
- Section 284 of Article 18 of the Alabama State Constitution states that legislative representation is based on population: any amendments are precluded from changing that.
- Part 4, Section, Article 288 of the Constitution of Portugal contains a list of 15 items that amendments "must respect".
- The Supreme Court of India in the Kesavananda Bharati case held that no constitutional amendment can destroy the basic structure of the Constitution of India.
- Article 60 of the current 1988 Constitution of Brazil forbids amendments that intend to abolish individual rights or to alter the fundamental framework of the State: the Separation of Powers and the Federal Republic.
- Article 152 of the Constitution of Romania on the "limits of revision" prohibits amendments regarding the independence and territorial integrity of Romania, the independence of justice, the republican form of government, political pluralism, and the official language. It also forbids amendments which restrict civil rights and liberties.
- Under Article 175 of the Constitution of Morocco as promulgated after a referendum in 2011, no revision may apply to the provisions concerning the Muslim religion, the monarchical form of the State, the democratic choice of the Nation or the established fundamental rights and liberties written in the present Constitution. In particular no change may be brought to the articles naming Islam the state religion or to those detailing the functions of the King as Amir al-Mu'minin (Commander of the Faithful).
- Chapter XVI, Article 37(5) of the Indonesian Constitution states that the form of the unitary state cannot be changed.

== See also ==
- Amend (motion) – Motion in parliamentary procedure
- Constitutional crisis – Conflict a governing law is unable to resolve
- Constitutional reforms of Augustus – Laws enacted by Roman Emperor Augustus between 30 BC and 2 BC
- List of national constitutions
- List of proposed amendments to the United States Constitution
- Judicial reform – Political reform of a country's judiciary
- Unconstitutional constitutional amendment – Concept in constitutional law
