= People's initiative =

Method of proposing constitutional amendments in the Philippines

In the Philippines, a people's initiative (PI) is one of the three ways by which amendments to the Constitution of the Philippines may be proposed. The other two are through a constituent assembly (or "con-ass") and a constitutional convention (or "con-con"). The term also refers to the act of pushing an initiative (national or local) allowed by the Philippine Initiative and Referendum Act of 1987, as well as the product of such an initiative.

The provision in the 1987 Constitution of the Philippines allowing for a "people's initiative" as one of the modes for constitutional amendment has been called the "people's initiative clause." The other modes allowed by the Constitution involve a constituent assembly or a constitutional convention, both of which also allow a total revision of the charter.

The term also refers to the act allowed by the legal right of the Filipinos to directly initiate statutes or call for referendums at both the national and local government levels.

== Summary ==
This is as defined in the Initiative and Referendum Act:

Type	Signatures required	Time limit limitations	Prohibited topics
Initiative on the constitution	12% of voters nationwide; 3% of voters in every legislative district	Can only be done five years after the ratification of the 1987 constitution, and once every 5 years thereafter	Petitions with more than one topic; Emergency measures, as defined by the constitution
Initiative on statutes	10% of voters nationwide; 3% of voters in every legislative district		Petitions with more than one topic; Emergency measures, as defined by the constitution
Initiative on local laws	10% of voters in a local government unit; 3% of voters in every legislative district; If province or city is composed of only one legislative district, it shall be 3% in every municipality in a province or barangay in a city; If in a municipality, 3% of every barangay; If in a barangay, 10% of voters	Shall not be exercised more than once a year	Petitions with more than one topic; Emergency measures, as defined by the constitution

== Constitutional amendment initiatives ==
The process of amending the 1987 Constitution of the Philippines is popularly known to many Filipinos as Charter Change. Any proposed amendment or revision must be ratified by the majority of Filipinos in a plebiscite.

Article XVII, Section 2 of the Constitution states:

Amendments to this Constitution may likewise be directly proposed by the people through initiative upon a petition of at least twelve per centum of the total number of registered voters, of which every legislative district must be represented by at least three per centum of the registered votes therein. No amendment under this section shall be authorized within five years following the ratification of this Constitution nor oftener than once every five years thereafter. The Congress shall provide for the implementation of the exercise of this right.

An enabling law for this Article XVII, Section 2 Philippine Constitutional provision, called the Initiative and Referendum Act, was authored in 1987 by senators Raul Roco and Neptali Gonzales and was passed by the Eighth Congress of the Philippines in 1989. The law provides for the implementation of the exercise of the people's right to initiate a petition to amend the Constitution, with the Election Registrar of the Commission on Elections (Comelec) tasked under the law with the verification of the petition signatures' being by at least twelve per centum of the total number of registered voters in the state. However, the Supreme Court declared the Initiative and Referendum Act procedures for amending the constitution as fatally defective, although it didn't affect the operation of the law for other types of initiatives.

=== 1997 People’s Initiative for Reform Modernization and Action ===
At the tail-end of the presidency of Fidel Ramos, a group known as the People's Initiative for Reform Modernization and Action (PIRMA, the Tagalog word for "signature") started a signature campaign for amending the constitution, such as shift to a parliamentary system of government and the lifting of term limits on elected officials, including Ramos himself. The president denied being behind the campaign. The Supreme Court shot down PIRMA's petition, saying that there was no enabling law for it, and that the group's petition was defective.

=== 2006 Sigaw ng Bayan ===
During the presidency of Gloria Macapagal Arroyo, the Supreme Court rejected the petition of Sigaw ng Bayan, saying that their petition was defective because they did not show the people the full text of the proposed amendments before having them sign the petition.

=== 2024 People's Initiative for Reform Modernization and Action ===
In 2024, PIRMA initiated another People's Initiative attempt. On January 9, they launched a television commercial with the tagline "EDSA-Pwera" (a word play of EDSA and the Spanish-derived Tagalog term etsapuwera, which means to be rejected or excluded). PIRMA admitted talking with House Speaker Martin Romualdez about the initiative and claimed responsibility for a signature drive campaign that began around that time but denied allegations of vote-buying. By the evening of January 23, the proponents claimed that they have achieved the minimum 12 percent national voter threshold.

The proponents suggested that both chambers of Congress, the House of Representatives and the Senate, should vote jointly on the proposed amendments in a constitutional assembly. However, the 24-member Senate has opposed the proposal, as its vote would be outweighed by the 316-member House of Representatives.

In 2024, the Catholic Bishops' Conference of the Philippines' Pablo Virgilio David released a statement questioning the legitimacy of the people’s initiative, suggesting it was primarily driven by “a few public servants and not truly the initiative of ordinary citizens, as it involves deception and disregard for our true and free participation in the democratic process of our country. Is that good?”

== Statute and referendum initiatives ==
The People's Initiative can also refer to the right of Filipinos to initiate statutes as well as call for referendums on both the national and local government level, a right given by the Initiative and Referendum Act of 1987.

=== 2014 People's Initiative Against Pork Barrel ===
From late June to early August 2014, a People's Initiative Against Pork Barrel (PIAP) was repeatedly announced as up for launch in a forthcoming August 23 "people's congress" in Cebu City. The initiative, a multisectoral alliance-driven proposition to criminalize pork barrel fund creation and spending, was led by various groups and individuals including Cebu Archbishop Jose S. Palma, the broad #AbolishPorkMovement, the Catholic Church-backed Cebu Coalition Against the Pork Barrel System, the Church People's Alliance Against Pork Barrel, ePIRMA (Empowered People's Initiative and Reform Movement Alliance), the Makabayan Coalition (principally through Bayan Muna party-list representative Neri Colmenares), the Solidarity for Transformation, Youth Act Now, the Scrap Pork Network, and former Philippine Supreme Court Chief Justice Reynato Puno. The Cebu congress was immediately followed by a signature rally at Luneta Park, on August 25, 2014.

The proposition was one of civil society's resulting reactions to the Priority Development Assistance Fund scam of 2013 and the Million People March and other protests that followed. An exploratory "people's congress" to draft an initiative on spending public funds was first convened by the ePIRMA at the Asian Institute of Management Conference Center on November 9, 2013, with Puno, Colmenares and ePIRMA's legal-team head Jose M. Roy III leading the conference that was attended by representatives from various groups coming from all over the country. ePIRMA and the "people's congress" alliance later scheduled its first draft to be completed by January 2014 while it was awaiting the Supreme Court's decision on prior petitions against both the Priority Development Assistance Fund (PDAF) and the "presidential pork" disbursements under Benigno Aquino III's government's Disbursement Acceleration Program (DAP).

Petitions against the PDAF were first filed with the Supreme Court by the Social Justice Society on August 28, 2013, by Greco Belgica et al. on September 3, 2013, and by Pedrito Nepomuceno on September 5, 2013. Petitions against the DAP were filed with the Supreme Court by nine separate groups of petitioners between October 7 and November 7, 2013. The petitioners included the Integrated Bar of the Philippines, Bagong Alyansang Makabayan, GABRIELA Women's Party, Bayan Muna, Ang Kapatiran, and Belgica, among others. On November 19, 2013, the Supreme Court declared the PDAF unconstitutional; a decision on the DAP came out seven and a half months later, on July 1, 2014, also declaring basic parts of the program as unconstitutional.

Under the PIAP's proposed Pork Barrel Abolition Act, all budgets submitted to any legislative body shall contain only itemized appropriations, except funds for relief and rescue operations during calamities and funds for intelligence work and security. The proposed legislation also called for the abolition of the Presidential Social Fund, which has also been described as a form of pork barrel. Violators of this law were to be banned for life from holding public office.

On November 25, 2014, the Philippine Daily Inquirer reported that the Philippine Commission on Elections received the first 10,000 signatures from the initiative thrust in Quezon City. The signatures were from the city's first six districts, a first installment of the required 177,000 signatures from the entire city territory. Meanwhile, PIAP-Metro Manila coordinator Mark Lui Aquino said they had yet to submit to the Comelec the 50,000 to 100,000 signatures they had gathered in the metropolis. PIAP-Quezon City spokesperson Malou Turalde said, however, that Quezon City was not the first to submit to the Comelec gathered signatures for the initiative, adding that other legislative districts "just want to be quiet." Aquino also expressed fear that the "Comelec seems unready" and added that, based on his group's monitoring, the Comelec offices in the different cities and municipalities "do not know what to do with the signatures."

==== Malacañang's resistance to the initiative ====
On September 4, 2014, Rep. Neri Colmenares announced that the ruling Liberal Party was trying to undermine the people's initiative against the pork barrel system. During his interpellation on the same day, at the Philippine Congress budget committee hearing on the 2015 budget for the Philippine Commission on Elections, Colmenares noticed that the Malacañang Palace and its allies in Congress took out the budget that they had placed for a charter change (Cha-Cha) referendum they were planning to launch. Colmenares asked for the budget to be reinserted for the people's initiative plebiscite, but budget committee vice-chair Dakila Cua (Liberal Party, formerly Lakas Kampi CMD) said that Colmenares's motion should be made during the committee deliberations on the budget. A number of Liberal Party leaders and spokesmen earlier announced their wish to amend the Constitution to allow President Benigno Aquino III to run for re-election; as under the present Constitution the President cannot run again for the same office after his single six-year term.

Furthermore, groups against the pork barrel noted that the Aquino government had drafted a national budget for 2015 that still contained "pork" in the form of "special purpose funds," thus ignoring the earlier SC ruling on such funds' unconstitutionality as well as salient points in the PIAP. The groups further noted that this pork budget allocation had ballooned to 27 billion pesos, from the previous year's PHP25 billion pesos.The groups urged Congress to junk the budget. On November 25, during the Senate plenary session tackling the said budget, Senator Miriam Defensor-Santiago raised the same points raised by the Makabayan group in the House of Representatives hearings, boosting the Makabayan position on the budget bill amendments.

In January 2015, Palma reiterated the importance of the initiative, saying that although the Supreme Court had already declared the Priority Development Assistance Fund (PDAF) and the Disbursement Acceleration Program (DAP) as unconstitutional funds, members of Congress continued to enjoy discretionary funds under other forms.

==== Attack on anti-pork campaigner ====
On September 29, 2014, minutes after the anti-pork forum in Tagum City, Davao del Norte, which also launched the PIAP in the province, Dexter Ian Selebrado, 32, of the group Kilusang Magbubukid ng Pilipinas - Davao del Norte (Farmers' Movement of the Philippines - Davao del Norte) and one of the local campaigners against pork barrel funds, was attacked by motorcycle-riding gunmen. As of October 1, the farmer-activist was still in critical condition.

==== Politicians' resistance to the initiative ====
In his January 2015 conference with the press, Palma lamented the intervention of politicians in the turnout of citizens at the signature centers in his parishes. Apart from a lack of knowledge about the pork barrel, Palma claimed that a low turnout was also a result of there being families who had children enrolled in schools under politicians' pork-funded scholarships whose relatives then refused to sign the proposition. Turnout results in other dioceses were also not good, he said. He promised, however, that the Church would not be disheartened and cited the strong support of people in such dioceses as Calbayog.

==== The initiative and the pork barrel issue by 2016 ====
In his blog of July 4, 2016, direct democracy advocate and art critic-painter Jojo Soria de Veyra, a member of ePIRMA, confessed that after the initiative's launch "the signature gathering was mostly left to certain parishes of the more organized Catholic Church, the primary backing of the Cebu Coalition. Sporadic rallies of support were organized by the Makabayan group and provincial groups. Other members of ePIRMA were seen to have moved on to various other national concerns. Manny SD Lopez—ePIRMA's leading convenor and most active campaigner on the road—would also busy himself with organizing the Christian Peace Alliance, one of the groups advocating for a drastic review of some provisions of the then-in-its-final-thrust Bangsamoro Basic Law. Lopez would also form the EdlSA 2.22.15 Coalition, a group that called for President Benigno Aquino III's resignation after the Mamasapano mishap. I submit that in this latter period I was not privy anymore to how the signature-gathering for the initiative on the pork barrel was progressing. I did hear of some pockets of resistance to the initiative, as well as the Comelec's seeming lack of enthusiasm towards verifying the signatures, but that's about it. . . . Then came the various noises leading to the 2016 general election, within which news concerning the initiative's progress were nowhere anymore to be found on Google." De Veyra, also a convenor of a Facebook group called Forum for Direct Democracy, then proceeded in his blog to propose amendments to the Initiative and Referendum Act that would make the law easier for the people to use as well as obligate Comelec to do its part in the initiative process within a limited time period.

Meanwhile, on August 31, Senator Panfilo Lacson told the media that "the ₱3.35-trillion proposed budget presented by Malacañang [under the newly-elected Duterte administration] to the Senate for congressional approval is laden with 'pork' and violated the Supreme Court rulings on the Priority Development Assistance Fund and Disbursement Acceleration Program."

=== 2020 PIRMA Kapamilya ===
After the denial of the franchise of ABS-CBN in 2020, a group called "PIRMA Kapamilya" launched an effort to give ABS-CBN a franchise via people's initiative.

== Local initiatives ==
Local initiatives, however, appear to be more likely to succeed. The first such initiative, initiated twelve years after the Initiative and Referendum Act was passed, was advanced in 2011 in Barangay Milagrosa, Quezon City, with the aim of stopping the continued influx of informal settlers and the sale of illegal drugs in the barangay. The initiative passed, with 465 in favor and 384 against out of the 3,665 registered voters in the barangay eligible to participate.

== See also ==
- Constitutional reform in the Philippines
- Direct democracy
