= Constitutional convention (Philippines) =

Method of proposing constitutional amendments in the Philippines

In the Philippines, a constitutional convention (sometimes shortened to con-con) is one of the three ways by which amendments or revisions to the Constitution of the Philippines may be proposed. The other two are through a people's initiative and the constituent assembly. Article XVII, Section 3 of the Constitution says, "The Congress may, by a vote of two-thirds of all its Members, call a constitutional convention, or by a majority vote of all its Members, submit to the electorate the question of calling such a convention."

The 1987 Constitution does not specify how delegates to a constitutional convention should be chosen. For past conventions, this has been specified in the legislation calling for the convention. In 1971, under an earlier constitution, Republic Act No. 6132 provided that delegates to a constitutional convention would be elected by the national legislative district in a special election. The 1987 Constitution specifies that any proposed amendments to the 1987 Constitution must be ratified by a majority of voters in a plebiscite.

The process of amending or revising the 1987 Constitution has become known as charter change.

== List ==
There have been five constitutional conventions in Philippine history:

Election	Convention	Constitution	Plebiscite
1898	Malolos Congress	Malolos Constitution	Approved by assembly
1934	Philippine Constitutional Convention of 1934	1935 Constitution of the Philippines	1935; 96.43% in favor
None	Preparatory Committee for Philippine Independence	1943 Constitution of the Philippines	Approved by assembly
1970	Philippine Constitutional Convention of 1971	1973 Constitution of the Philippines	1973; 90.67% in favor
None	Philippine Constitutional Commission of 1986	1987 Constitution of the Philippines	1987; 77.04% in favor

== See also ==
- Constitutional reform in the Philippines
- Constitution of the Philippines
- Federalism in the Philippines
