= Constitution of the Philippines =

Supreme law of the Philippines

Constitution of Republic of the Philippines
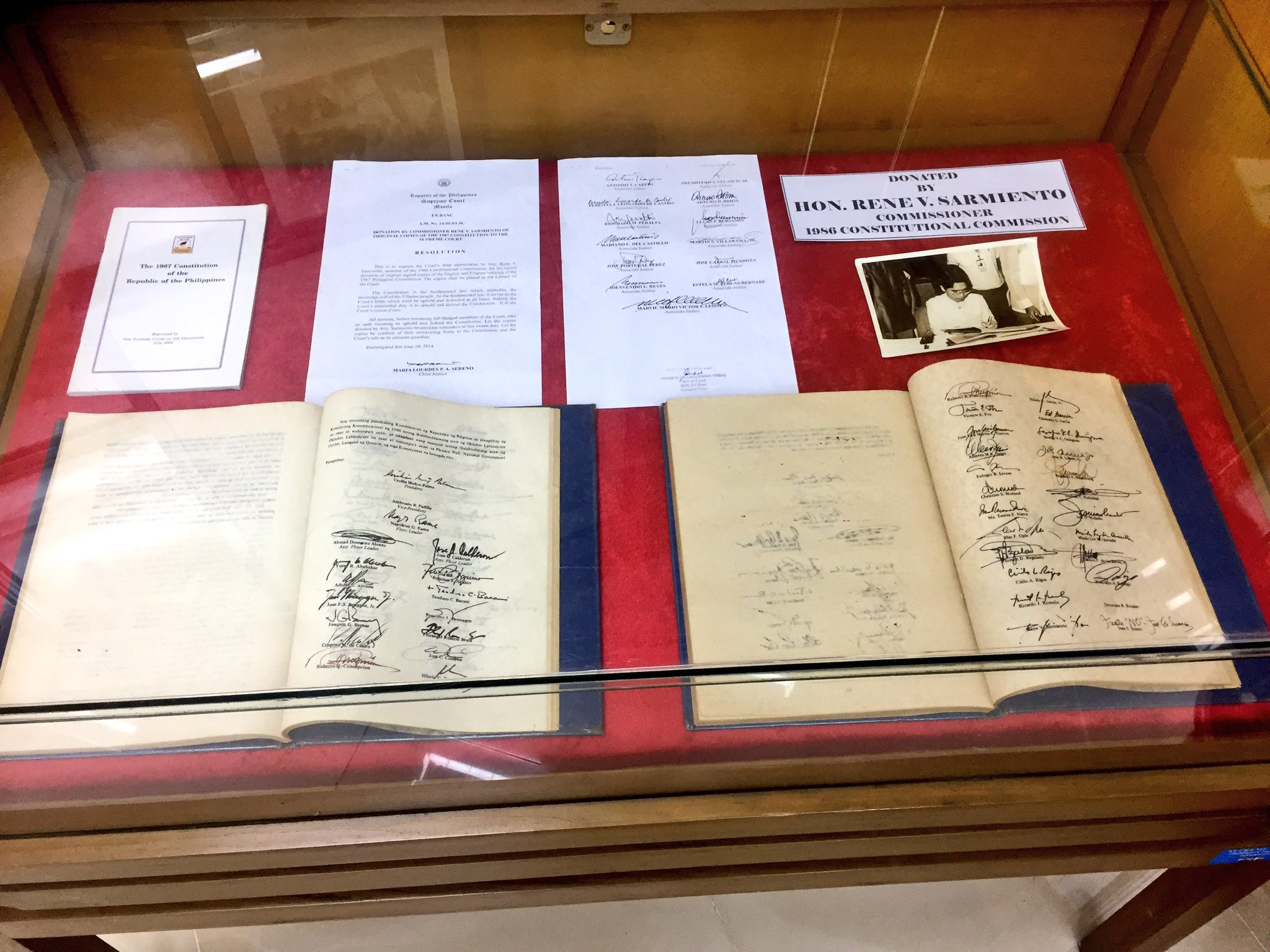
- A photo of the original copies of the 1987 Philippine Constitution in English and Filipino, located at the Library of the Supreme Court.

Overview
- Jurisdiction: Philippines
- Created: October 12, 1986
- Presented: October 15, 1986
- Ratified: February 2, 1987
- Date effective: February 2, 1987
- System: Unitary presidential constitutional republic

Government structure
- Branches: 3 (executive, legislative, judiciary)
- Chambers: Bicameral (Congress): Senate; House of Representatives
- Executive: President
- Judiciary: Supreme Court and in such lower courts as may be established by law.
- Federalism: Unitary (See Federalism in the Philippines)

History
- First legislature: July 27, 1987
- First executive: June 30, 1992
- Amendments: None (See Proposed amendments to the 1987 Constitution)
- Location: Legislative Archives, Library and Museum, Batasang Pambansa Complex, Quezon City
- Commissioned by: Revolutionary Government of Corazon Aquino
- Author: Constitutional Commission of 1986
- Signatories: 47 of the 48 commissioners
- Supersedes: Presidential Proclamation No. 3 (1986 Freedom Constitution)

Full text
- Constitution of the Philippines (1987) at Wikisource

The Constitution of the Philippines (Filipino: Saligang Batas ng Pilipinas or Konstitusyon ng Pilipinas), also known as the 1987 Constitution, is the supreme law of the Philippines. Its final draft was completed by the Constitutional Commission on October 12, 1986, and ratified by a nationwide plebiscite on February 2, 1987. The Constitution remains unamended to this day.

The Constitution consists of a preamble and eighteen articles. It mandates a democratic and republican form of government and includes a bill of rights that guarantees entrenched freedoms and protections against governmental overreach. The Constitution also organizes the main branches of the Philippine government: a legislative department known as the Congress, which consists of the Senate and the House of Representatives; an executive department headed by a president; and a judicial department, which includes the Supreme Court and lower courts. It also establishes three independent constitutional commissions—Civil Service Commission (CSC), the Commission on Elections (COMELEC), and the Commission on Audit (COA)—each enjoying fiscal autonomy. Other governmental bodies created under the Constitution include the Commission on Appointments (CA), the Judicial and Bar Council (JBC), the Office of the Ombudsman, and the Commission on Human Rights (CHR).

Throughout its history, the Philippines has been governed by three other constitutions: the 1935 Commonwealth Constitution, which established the current presidential system of government; the 1973 Constitution, initially reintroducing the parliamentary system but later amended to adopt a semi-presidential system; and the 1986 Freedom Constitution, briefly implemented after the People Power Revolution.

The constitution of the then-First Philippine Republic, the 1899 Malolos Constitution, which aimed to establish the first functional parliamentary republic in Asia, was never fully implemented nationwide and did not lead to international recognition, largely due to the outbreak of the Philippine–American War.

== Background of the 1987 Constitution ==
Ruling by decree in the early months of her presidency following the 1986 People Power Revolution, President Corazon Aquino was presented with three options: restore the 1935 Constitution; retain and reform the 1973 Constitution; or pass a new constitution. She decided to have a new constitution and issued Proclamation No. 3 on March 25, 1986, abrogating many provisions in the 1973 Constitution adopted by the Marcos regime, including the unicameral legislature (the Batasang Pambansa), the office of Prime Minister, and additional legislative powers for the President. Often called the "Freedom Constitution", it was intended as a transitional basic law to ensure democracy, freedom of the people, and an orderly transfer of power as the Constitutional Commission was drafting a permanent charter.

The Constitutional Commission was composed of forty-eight members appointed by Aquino from varied backgrounds, including several former members of the House of Representatives, former justices of the Supreme Court, a Catholic bishop, and political activists against the Marcos regime. Aquino appointed Cecilia Muñoz-Palma, a former Associate Justice of the Supreme Court, as president of the commission. Several issues were of particular contention during the commission's sessions, including the form of government to adopt, the abolition of the death penalty, the retention of U.S. bases in Clark and Subic, and the integration of economic policies into the constitution. Lino Brocka, a film director and political activist who was a member of the commission, walked out before the constitution's completion, and two other delegates dissented from the final draft. The Commission finished the final draft on October 12, 1986, and presented it to Aquino on October 15. The constitution was ratified by a nationwide plebiscite on February 2, 1987.

The constitution provided for three governmental branches, namely the executive, legislative, and judicial branches. The executive branch is headed by the president and his appointed cabinet members. The executive, same with the other two co-equal branches, has limited power. This is to ensure that the country will be "safeguarded" if martial law is to be declared. The president can still declare martial law, but it expires within 60 days and Congress can either reject or extend it.

The task of the Supreme Court is to review whether a declaration of martial law is just. The legislative power consists of the Senate and the House of Representatives. There are twenty-four senators and the House is composed of district representatives. It also created opportunities for under-represented sectors of community to select their representative through party-list system. The judiciary branch comprises the Supreme Court and the lower courts. The Supreme Court is granted the power to hear any cases that deals with the constitutionality of law, about a treaty or decree of the government. It is also tasked to administrate the function of the lower courts.

Through the constitution, three independent Constitutional Commissions, namely the Civil Service Commission, Commission on Elections, and Commission on Audit, were created. These Constitutional Commissions have different functions. The constitution also paved a way for the establishment of the Office of the Ombudsman, which has a function of promoting and ensuring an ethical and lawful conduct of the government.

== Offices created by the constitution ==
- Congress of the Philippines (Art VI, Sec 1)
  - Senate
  - House of Representatives
- President of the Senate (Art VI, Sec 16)
- Speaker of the House (Art VI, Sec 16)
- Senate Electoral Tribunal (Art VI, Sec 17)
- House of Representatives Electoral Tribunal (Art VI, Sec 17)
- Commission on Appointments (Art VI, Sec 18)
- President of the Philippines (Art VII, Sec 1)
- Vice President (Art VII, Sec 3)
- Supreme Court and lower courts (Art VIII, Sec 1)
- Judicial and Bar Council (Art VIII, Sec 8)
- Constitutional commissions (Art IX, Sec 1)
  - Civil Service Commission
  - Commission on Elections
  - Commission on Audit
- Office of the Ombudsman (Art XI, Sec 5)
- Commission on Human Rights (Art XII, Sec 17)
- Armed Forces of the Philippines (Art XVI, Sec 4)
- National Police Commission (Art XVI, Sec 6)
- Constitutional convention (Art XVII, Sec 3)

Offices mentioned but not created:

- Cabinet (Art VII, Sec 3)
- Provincial board of canvassers (Art VII, Sec 4)
- Executive departments, bureaus and offices (Art VII, Sec 17)
- Monetary board (Art VII, Sec 20)
- Philippine Bar (Art VIII, Sec 7)
- Clerk of the Supreme Court (Art VIII, Sec 8)
- Provinces, cities, municipalities and barangays (Art X, Sec 1)
- Autonomous regions (Art X, Sec 1)
- Sandiganbayan (Art XI, Sec 4)
- National Economic and Development Authority (Art XII, Sec 9)
- National language commission (Komisyon ng Wikang Pilipino; Art XIV, Sec 9)
- Chief of Staff of the Armed Forces of the Philippines (Art XVI, Sec 5)

== Attempts to amend or change the 1987 Constitution ==
There are three possible methods by which the Constitution can be amended: a Constituent assembly (Con-Ass), Constitutional Convention (Con-Con), or People's Initiative. All three methods require ratification by majority vote in a national referendum. Following the administration of Corazon Aquino, succeeding administrations made several attempts to amend or change the 1987 Constitution.

The first attempt was in 1995. A constitution was drafted by then-Secretary of National Security Council Jose Almonte, but was never completed because it was exposed to the media by different non-government organizations. They saw through a potential change regarding the protection of the people's interests in the constitutional draft.

In 1997, the Pedrosa couple created a group called PIRMA followed with an attempt to change the constitution through a People's Initiative by way of gathering signatures from voters. Many prominent figures opposed the proposition, including Senator Miriam Defensor-Santiago, who brought the issue all the way to the Supreme Court and eventually won the case. The Supreme Court ruled that the initiative not continue, stating that a People's Initiative requires an enabling law for it to push through.

During his presidency, Joseph Ejercito Estrada created a study commission for a possible charter change regarding the economic and judiciary provisions of the constitution. The attempt never attained its purpose after various entities opposed it due apparently to the attempt serving the personal interests of the initiators.

After the Estrada presidency, the administration of Gloria Macapagal-Arroyo endorsed constitutional changes via a Constitutional Assembly, with then-House Speaker Jose de Venecia leading the way. However, due to political controversies surrounding Arroyo's administration, including the possibility of term extension, the proposal was rejected by the Supreme Court.

The next attempt was from then-Speaker of the House Feliciano Belmonte Jr. during President Benigno Aquino III's administration. Belmonte attempted to introduce amendments to the Constitution focusing on economic provisions aiming toward liberalization. The effort did not succeed.

President Rodrigo Duterte oversaw the possibility of implementing federalism on the country. Following his ascension as president after the 2016 presidential election, he signed Executive Order No. 10 on December 7, 2016, creating the Consultative Committee to Review the 1987 Constitution.

A year after Bongbong Marcos was proclaimed president, his first cousin Speaker Martin Romualdez told an economic forum on December 11, 2023 that legislators from the House of Representatives will renew efforts at changing the 1987 charter for them to regulate economic sectors that can be opened for foreign investors, but this time through People's Initiative. Law expert Michael Henry Yusingco commented that Romualdez should show there is clear public support to amend it because without any such proof, plans will encounter hitches like before.

== Structure and contents ==
The Constitution comprises the preamble and eighteen self-contained articles with a section numbering that resets for every article.

=== Preamble ===
The opening text introduces the constitution and the people as the source of sovereignty. It follows past constitutions, including an appeal to God. The preamble reads:

We, the sovereign Filipino people, imploring the aid of Almighty God, in order to build a just and humane society and establish a Government that shall embody our ideals and aspirations, promote the common good, conserve and develop our patrimony, and secure to ourselves and our posterity the blessings of independence and democracy under the rule of law and a regime of truth, justice, freedom, love, equality, and peace, do ordain and promulgate this Constitution.

=== Article I – National Territory ===
The national territory comprises the Philippine archipelago, with all the islands and waters embraced therein, and all other territories over which the Philippines has sovereignty or jurisdiction, consisting of its terrestrial, fluvial, and aerial domains, including its territorial sea, the seabed, the subsoil, the insular shelves, and other submarine areas. The waters around, between, and connecting the islands of the archipelago, regardless of their breadth and dimensions, form part of the internal waters of the Philippines.

=== Article II – Declaration of Principles and State Policies ===
Article II lays out the basic social and political creed of the Philippines, particularly the implementation of the constitution and sets forth the objectives of the government. Some essential provisions are:

- The Philippines is a democratic republic
- Renunciation of war as a form of national policy
- Supremacy of civilian over military authority
- Separation of church and state (inviolable)
- Pursuit of an independent foreign policy
- Abrogation of nuclear weaponry
- Family as the basic unit of the state
- Role of youth and women in nation-building
- Autonomy of local governments
- Equal opportunity for public services and the prohibition of political dynasties
- Protection and advancement of the right of the people to a balanced and healthful ecology

=== Article III – Bill of Rights ===
Article III enumerates specific protections against the abuse of state power, most of which are similar to the provisions of the U.S. Constitution. Some essential provisions are:

- a right to due process and equal protection of law
- a right against searches and seizures without a warrant issued by a judge
- a right to privacy
- The right to freedom of speech and expression, freedom of the press, freedom of assembly, and the right to petition
- The free exercise of religion
- a right of abode and the right to travel
- a right to information on matters of public concern
- a right to form associations
- a right of free access to courts
- the right to remain silent and to have competent legal counsel
- a right to bail and against excessive bail conditions
- a right to habeas corpus
- the right to a speedy trial
- the right against self-incrimination
- the right to political beliefs and aspirations
- a prohibition against cruel, degrading, or inhuman punishment
- protection providing for no imprisonment for debt
- the right against double jeopardy
- prohibition of ex post facto laws and bills of attainder.

Similar to U.S. jurisprudence and other common law jurisdictions, the scope and limitations of these rights have largely been determined by the Supreme Court through case law.

=== Article IV – Citizenship ===
Article IV defines the citizenship of Filipinos. It enumerates two kinds of citizens: natural-born citizens and naturalized citizens. Natural-born citizens are those who are citizens from birth without having to perform any act to acquire or perfect Philippine citizenship. The Philippines follows a jus sanguinis system where citizenship is mainly acquired through a blood relationship with Filipino citizens.

Natural-born citizenship forms an important part of the political system as only natural-born Filipinos are eligible to hold high offices, including all elective offices beginning with a representative in the House of Representatives up to the President.

=== Article V – Suffrage ===
Article V mandates various age and residence qualifications to vote and a system of secret ballots and absentee voting. It also mandates a procedure for overseas and disabled and illiterate Filipinos to vote.

=== Article VI – Legislative Department ===
Article VI provides for a bicameral legislature called the Congress composed of the Senate and the House of Representatives. It vests upon Congress, among others, the power of investigation and inquiry in aid of legislation, the power to declare the existence of a state of war, the power of the purse, the power of taxation, and the power of eminent domain.

When the constitution was being drafted by constitutional commission in 1986, the members vigorously debated between returning the Philippines' bicameral legislature from prior to martial law in 1972 or instituting a new unicameral legislature, with the commission narrowly voting 23 to 22 in favor of bicameralism.

=== Article VII – Executive Department ===
Article VII vests the executive power solely in the President.

The President is elected directly for a single six-year term. Re-election is not allowed, except in the case where the President has not yet served for more than four years, in which they may be elected again for a full six-year term. This exception was utilized by Gloria Macapagal Arroyo during the 2004 presidential election, which she eventually won.

The Constitution also establishes the position of Vice-President, who can serve for up to two consecutive six-year terms. The Vice-President may optionally be appointed as member of the Cabinet.

The President and the Vice-President must meet the following qualifications:

- Natural-born Filipino citizen;
- Registered voter;
- Able to read and write;
- At least forty years old on election day; and
- Must have been residing in the Philippines for at least ten years on election day.

The President and the Vice-President are elected separately from each other. It is thus common in the Philippines for the President and the Vice-President to come from two entirely different parties or alliances. For example, in 2016, Rodrigo Duterte, running on a nationalist and populist platform, was elected president. Meanwhile, Leni Robredo, a member of the Liberal Party and the most prominent opposition figure during the Duterte administration, won as vice-president.

While the Cabinet was mentioned several times in the article, the Constitution did not expressly provide for the creation of such body or to specifically enumerate its ordinary powers and duties.

The President serves as the commander-in-chief of "all armed forces", which can be construed to encompass not only the Armed Forces of the Philippines but also other armed uniformed services such as the Philippine National Police and the Philippine Coast Guard. The President may mobilize these forces to prevent or suppress "lawless violence", invasions or rebellions. However, in cases where public safety necessitates it, the President is authorized to declare a state of martial law throughout the entire Philippines or in specific areas, or to suspend the privilege of the writ of habeas corpus. While it does not specify the extent of the President's powers during martial law, the Constitution explicitly prohibits the suspension of the Constitution, the replacement of civilian courts and assemblies, and the use of military courts and agencies over civilians when civilian courts are still operational during such state. The proclamation of martial law also does not automatically suspend the privilege of the writ of habeas corpus.

=== Article VIII – Judicial Department ===
Article VIII vests the judicial power upon the Supreme Court and other lower courts as may be established by law (by Congress). While the power to appoint justices and judges still reside with the President, the President from a list of at least three nominees prepared by the Judicial and Bar Council for every vacancy, a body composed of the Chief Justice of the Supreme Court, the Secretary of Justice, the Chairs of the Senate and House Committees on Justice, and representatives from the legal profession.

=== Article IX – Constitutional Commissions ===
Article IX establishes three constitutional commissions, which are governmental bodies that are independent of the three main branches of government. These are the Civil Service Commission, the Commission on Elections, and the Commission on Audit.

=== Article X – Local Government ===
Article X pursues for local autonomy and mandates Congress to enact a law for the local government, now currently the Local Government Code.

=== Article XI – Accountability of Public Officers ===
Article XI establishes the Office of the Ombudsman which is responsible for investigating and prosecuting government officials. It also vests upon the Congress the power to impeach the President, the Vice President, members of the Supreme Court, and the Ombudsman.

=== Article XII – National Economy and Patrimony ===
Article XII lays down the goals and objectives of the Philippine government in terms of wealth distribution, division of goods and services and to offer job opportunities to elevate the lives of Filipino people. This section also provides important provisions such as:

- Promote effective industrialization and aim for a full employment of its people
- All natural resources within the Philippine territory shall be owned by the State
- Protect the rights of the indigenous cultural communities
- Businesses, organizations and other institutions shall be subject to the intervention of the State

Section 2 contains restrictions against any foreign ownership of land of the public domain and certain industries like media, and up to a maximum of 40% of voting equity on others and/or as put on a "Foreign Investment Negative List" (last revised 2022, three days before Rodrigo Duterte stepped down).

Section 7 prohibits transfer of private lands to individuals, corporations, or associations qualified to acquire or hold lands of the public domain save in cases of hereditary succession.

=== Article XIII – Social Justice and Human Rights ===
Article XIII divulge the utmost responsibility of the Congress to give the highest priority in enactments of such measures which protects and enhances the rights of all the people to human dignity through affirming that present social, economic and political inequalities as well as cultural inequities among the elites and the poor shall be reduced or removed in order to secure equitable welfare and common good among Filipino people. It also establishes the role of the Commission on Human Rights which ensures appropriate legal measures for the protection of human rights of all the persons within the Philippines as well as Filipinos residing abroad. Moreover, this section also lays down salient provisions such as:

- Protection of labor, be it local or overseas in order to promote full employment and equal opportunities for all.
- Protection of the rights and giving of support to independent Filipino farmers and fishermen among local communities for the utilization of their resources without foreign intrusion, together with the provision and application of Agrarian and Natural Resources Reform for the development of the lives of the people.
- Securing of the lives among the underprivileged citizens through Urban Land Reforms and Housing.
- Adoption and integration of affordable and competent medical care and health services for the welfare of every Filipino people.
- Recognition of the rights of women in workplace for the realization of their full potential in providing service to its nation.
- Recognition of the role and the rights of people's organizations.

=== Article XIV – Education, Science and Technology, Arts, Culture and Sports ===
- The State shall exercise reasonable supervision and regulation of all educational institutions, whether public or private.
- The guiding principle on education in general shall be the protection and promotion of the right of all citizens to quality education at all levels as well as taking appropriate steps to make education accessible to all.
- The subject of science and technology was given special attention through the formulation of several provisions on development and research incentives.
- The arts and letters remain under the patronage of the State which must be concerned in the protection and enrichment of our culture.
- For the first time, the subject of sports is given a specific section. The citizenry should not only be mentally and morally strong but must also be physically strong.

=== Article XV – The Family ===
Article XV establishes the recognition of the state on the Filipino family as the basic foundation of the nation as it shall reinforce and bolster its solidarity and steadily promote its development. Alongside with this, it also states important provisions such as:

- Protection of marriage by the state as it is recognized as the foundation of the family and is an inviolable institution.
- Provision of policies and programs subject to every Filipino family assuring the people's welfare and social security.
- Protection of the rights of spouses with responsible parenthood to found a family in accordance with their religious convictions.
- Recognition and protection of the rights of every Filipino child.

=== Article XVI – General Provisions ===
Article XVI contains several general provisions, such as a general description of the national flag, the establishment of the Armed Forces of the Philippines and a police force (presently the Philippine National Police), the regulation of mass media and advertising industries, the doctrine of sovereign immunity, and others.

=== Article XVII – Amendments or Revisions ===
Article XVII establishes the methods by which the Constitution may be amended or revised. Amendments may be proposed by either: a) a three-fourths vote of all Members of Congress (called a Constituent Assembly), b) a Constitutional Convention, or c) a petition of at least twelve percent of all registered voters, and at least three percent of registered voters within each district (called a People's Initiative). All amendments must be ratified in a national referendum.

=== Article XVIII – Transitory Provisions ===
Article XVIII establishes provisions to allow a clean transition from the preceding provisional constitution to the new Constitution. This includes provisions for directing the elections of the first members of the new Congress and of the President and the Vice President, specifying the current courts and the term limits of judges, specifying the initial salary for key members of government, mandating the newly elected Congress to pass laws to fulfill obligations set by these transitory provisions, and defining grace periods and limitations for previous treaties, laws, orders, and other instruments. This article also establishes that the new Constitution will take effect when ratified by a majority of votes in a plebiscite.

=== Other provisions ===
The Constitution also contains several other provisions enumerating various state policies including, i.e., the affirmation of labor "as a primary social economic force" (Section 14, Article II); the equal protection of "the life of the mother and the life of the unborn from conception" (Section 12, Article II); the "Filipino family as the foundation of the nation" (Article XV, Section 1); the recognition of Filipino as "the national language of the Philippines" (Section 6, Article XIV), and even a requirement that "all educational institutions shall undertake regular sports activities throughout the country in cooperation with athletic clubs and other sectors." (Section 19.1, Article XIV) Whether these provisions may, by themselves, be the source of enforceable rights without accompanying legislation has been the subject of considerable debate in the legal sphere and within the Supreme Court. The Court, for example, has ruled that a provision requiring that the State "guarantee equal access to opportunities to public service" could not be enforced without accompanying legislation, and thus could not bar the disallowance of so-called "nuisance candidates" in presidential elections. But in another case, the Court held that a provision requiring that the State "protect and advance the right of the people to a balanced and healthful ecology" did not require implementing legislation to become the source of operative rights.

== Historical development ==
Historical Philippine Constitutions
In operation	Constitution	Historical Period	Form of Government	Promulgated by	Ratification	Amendments
November 1, 1897 – December 14, 1897	Constitution of Biak-na-Bato	Republic of Biak-na-Bato	De facto Constitutional Republic	Katipunan, acting as Constitutional Assembly, Drafted by Isabelo Artacho and Félix Ferrer	Ratified by President Emilio Aguinaldo and 55 members of the Constitutional Assembly on November 1, 1897.	
January 23, 1899 – March 23, 1901	Malolos Constitution	First Philippine Republic	Unitary parliamentary constitutional republic	Malolos Congress	1899 constitutional plebiscite: Choice / Votes / %; For / 98 / 100; Against / 0 / 0; Invalid/blank votes / / –; Total / 98 / 100; Source:The Laws of the First Philippine Republic (The Laws of Malolos) 1898–1899	
December 10, 1898 – March 24, 1934	Philippine Organic Act (1902)	American Colonial Period	Unincorporated territories of the United States	United States Congress	Passed by 57th United States Congress, Enacted by US President Theodore Roosevelt on July 1, 1902.	
December 10, 1898 – March 24, 1934	Philippine Autonomy Act of 1916	American Colonial Period	Unincorporated territories of the United States	United States Congress	Passed by 64th United States Congress, Enacted by US President Woodrow Wilson on August 29, 1916.	
November 15, 1935 – July 4, 1946	1935 Constitution	Commonwealth of the Philippines	Presidential commonwealth	1934 Constitutional Convention	1935 Philippine constitutional plebiscite: Choice / Votes / %; For / 1,213,046 / 96.43; Against / 44,963 / 3.57; Invalid/blank votes / / –; Total / 1,258,009 / 100; Registered voters/turnout / 1,935,972; Source: Direct Democracy	1940 Amendment (Establishment of the Bicameral Philippine Congress)
July 4, 1946 – January 16, 1973	1935 Constitution	Third Philippine Republic	Unitary presidential Constitutional republic	1934 Constitutional Convention	1935 Philippine constitutional plebiscite: Choice / Votes / %; For / 1,213,046 / 96.43; Against / 44,963 / 3.57; Invalid/blank votes / / –; Total / 1,258,009 / 100; Registered voters/turnout / 1,935,972; Source: Direct Democracy	1947 Amendment (Provision of "parity rights" between American and Philippine citizens)
October 14, 1943 – August 17, 1945	1943 Constitution	Second Philippine Republic	Single-party authoritarian republic	Preparatory Committee for Philippine Independence	Ratified by the KALIBAPI on September 7, 1943	
January 17, 1973 – February 22, 1986	1973 Constitution	Fourth Philippine Republic	Unitary dominant-party parliamentary republic	1973 Constitutional Convention	1973 Philippine constitutional plebiscite Are you in favor of adopting the proposed constitution?: Choice / Votes / %; For / 14,976,561 / 95.27; Against / 743,869 / 4.73; Total / 15,720,430 / 100.00; Valid votes / 15,720,430 / 78.96; Invalid/blank votes / 4,188,330 / 21.04; Total votes / 19,908,760 / 100.00; Registered voters/turnout / 22,883,632 / 87.00; Source: Proclamation No. 1102, s. 1973	1976 Amendment (Continuation of Martial Law and substitution of the Regular Batasang Pambansa with the Interim Batasang Pambansa)
January 17, 1973 – February 22, 1986	1973 Constitution	Fourth Philippine Republic	Unitary dominant-party parliamentary republic	1973 Constitutional Convention	1973 Philippine constitutional plebiscite Are you in favor of adopting the proposed constitution?: Choice / Votes / %; For / 14,976,561 / 95.27; Against / 743,869 / 4.73; Total / 15,720,430 / 100.00; Valid votes / 15,720,430 / 78.96; Invalid/blank votes / 4,188,330 / 21.04; Total votes / 19,908,760 / 100.00; Registered voters/turnout / 22,883,632 / 87.00; Source: Proclamation No. 1102, s. 1973	1981 Amendment (Delegation of Power to the President, creation of the executive committee, establishment of a modified parliamentary system)
January 17, 1973 – February 22, 1986	1973 Constitution	Fourth Philippine Republic	Unitary dominant-party parliamentary republic	1973 Constitutional Convention	1973 Philippine constitutional plebiscite Are you in favor of adopting the proposed constitution?: Choice / Votes / %; For / 14,976,561 / 95.27; Against / 743,869 / 4.73; Total / 15,720,430 / 100.00; Valid votes / 15,720,430 / 78.96; Invalid/blank votes / 4,188,330 / 21.04; Total votes / 19,908,760 / 100.00; Registered voters/turnout / 22,883,632 / 87.00; Source: Proclamation No. 1102, s. 1973	1984 Amendment (Creation of the Office of the Vice President and abolition of the executive committee)
March 25, 1986 – February 1, 1987	Provisional Constitution of the Philippines (1986)		Revolutionary Government	President Corazon Aquino, Drafted by Reynato Puno	Promulgated by Presidential Proclamation on March 25, 1986.	
February 2, 1987 – present	1987 Constitution	Republic of the Philippines	Unitary presidential constitutional republic	1986 Constitutional Commission	1987 Philippine constitutional plebiscite Philippine constitutional plebiscite, 1987: Choice / Votes / %; For / 16,622,111 / 77.04; Against / 4,953,375 / 22.96; Total / 21,575,486 / 100.00; Valid votes / 21,575,486 / 99.04; Invalid/blank votes / 209,730 / 0.96; Total votes / 21,785,216 / 100.00; Registered voters/turnout / / 87.04	Proposed amendments to the 1987 Constitution

* Provisional in character due to the Revolutionary Government in effect at time of the enactment.

=== The 1897 Constitution of Biak-na-Bato ===
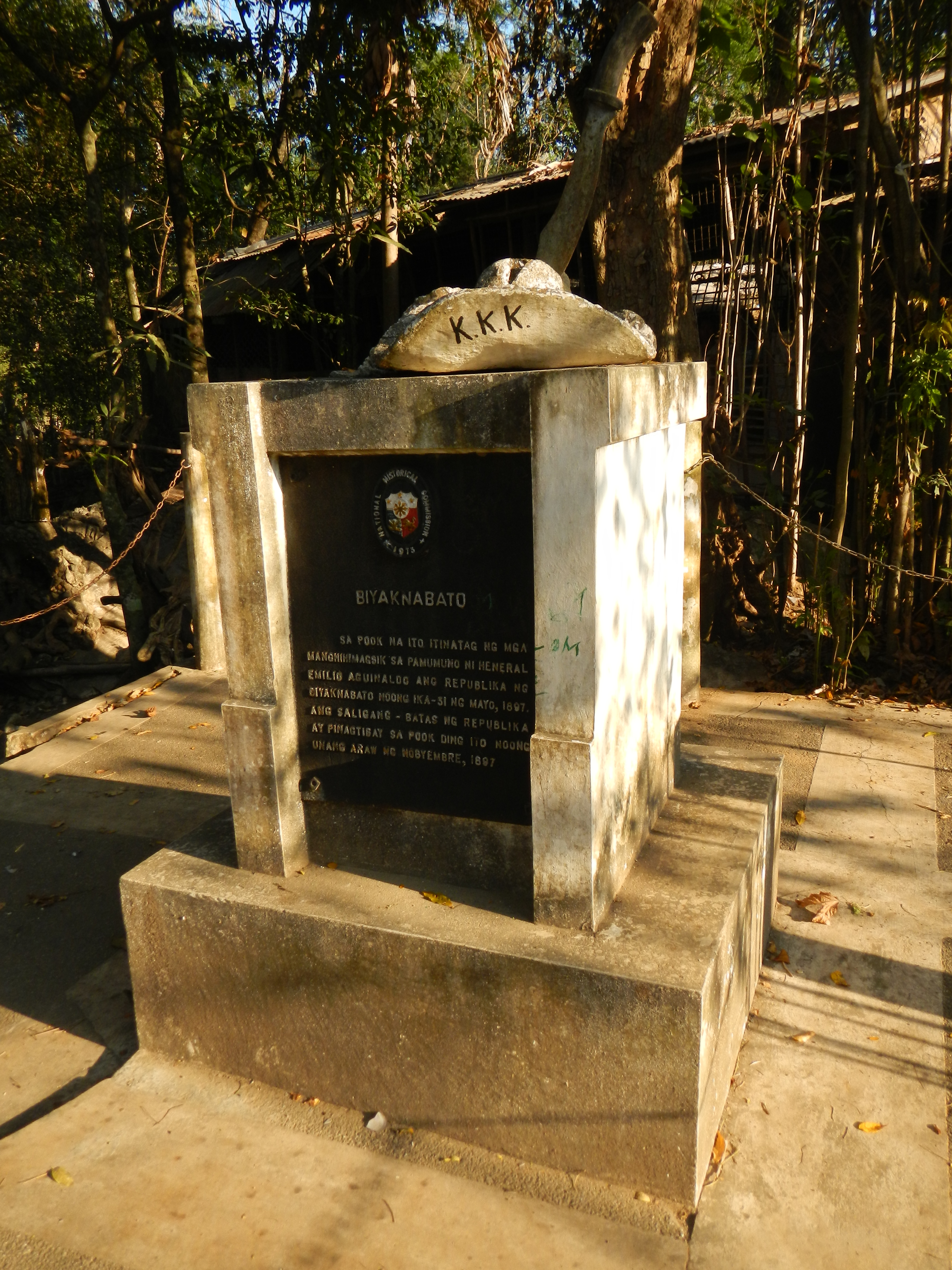
The Memorial at Biak-na-Bato National Park

The Katipunan's revolution led to the Tejeros Convention where, at San Francisco de Malabón, Cavite, on March 22, 1897, the first presidential and vice presidential elections in Philippine history were held—although only Katipuneros (viz. members of the Katipunan) were able to take part, and not the general populace. A later meeting of the revolutionary government established there, held on November 1, 1897, at Biak-na-Bato in the town of San Miguel de Mayumo in Bulacan, established the Republic of Biak-na-Bato. The republic had a constitution drafted by Isabelo Artacho and Félix Ferrer and was based on the first Cuban Constitution. It is known as the "Constitución Provisional de la República de Filipinas", and was originally written in and promulgated in the Spanish and Tagalog languages.

The organs of the government under the Constitution consisted of three divisions: (1) the Supreme Council, which was authorized with the power of the Republic in which it was headed by the President and the four different secretaries which was the interior, foreign affairs, treasury, and war; (2) the Consejo Supremo de Garcia Y Justicia (Supreme Council of Grace and Justice), which has the authority to create decisions and validate and refute the sentences given by the other courts and to command rules for the administration of justice; and (3) the Asamblea de Representantes (Assembly of the Representatives), which was to be assembled after the revolution to create a new constitution and to choose a new Council and representatives of the people.

The Constitution of Biak-na-Bato was never fully implemented, and was overtaken by the Pact of Biak-na-Bato between the Spanish and the Philippine Revolutionary Army.

=== The 1899 Malolos Constitution ===
The Filipino revolutionary leaders accepted a payment from Spain and went to exile in Hong Kong. The Americans defeated the Spanish in the Battle of Manila Bay and Aguinaldo was transferred to the Philippines by the United States Navy. The newly reformed Philippine revolutionary forces returned to the control of Aguinaldo and the Philippine Declaration of Independence was issued on June 12, 1898. On September 17, 1898, the Malolos Congress was elected, which was composed of wealthy and educated men.

The document was patterned after the Spanish Constitution of 1812, with influences from the charters of Belgium, Mexico, Brazil, Nicaragua, Costa Rica, and Guatemala and the French Constitution of 1793. The Malolos Constitution, namely, the Kartilya and the Sanggunian-Hukuman, the charter of laws and morals of the Katipunan written by Emilio Jacinto in 1896; the Biak-na-Bato Constitution of 1897 planned by Isabelo Artacho; Mabini's Constitutional Program of the Philippine Republic of 1898; the provisional constitution of Mariano Ponce in 1898 that followed the Spanish constitutions; and the autonomy projects of Paterno in 1898.

The Malolos Constitution was the first republican constitution in Asia. It declared that sovereignty resides exclusively in the people, stated basic civil rights, separated the church and state, and called for the creation of an Assembly of Representatives to act as the legislative body. It also called for a parliamentary republic as the form of government. The president was elected for a term of four years by a majority of the Assembly. It was titled "Constitución política", and was written in Spanish following the declaration of independence from Spain, proclaimed on January 20, 1899, and was enacted and ratified by the Malolos Congress, a congress held in Malolos, Bulacan.

The Preamble reads:

Nosotros los Representantes del Pueblo Filipino, convocados legítimamente para establecer la justicia, proveer a la defensa común, promover el bien general y asegurar los beneficios de la libertad, implorando el auxilio del Soberano Legislador del Universo para alcanzar estos fines, hemos votado, decretado y sancionado la siguiente:

(We, the Representatives of the Filipino people, lawfully convened in order to establish justice, provide for common defence, promote the general welfare, and insure the benefits of liberty, imploring the aid of the Sovereign Legislator of the Universe for the attainment of these ends, have voted, decreed, and sanctioned the following:)

=== Acts of the United States Congress ===
The Philippines was a United States Territory from December 10, 1898, to March 24, 1934 and therefore was under the jurisdiction of the Federal Government of the United States. Two acts of the United States Congress passed during this period can be considered Philippine constitutions in that those acts defined the fundamental political principles and established the structure, procedures, powers and duties of the Philippine government.

==== Philippine Organic Act of 1902 ====
The Philippine Organic Act of 1902, sometimes known as the "Philippine Bill of 1902" or the "Cooper Act", was the first organic law for the Philippine Islands enacted by the United States Congress. It provided for the creation of a popularly elected Philippine Assembly, and specified that legislative power would be vested in a bicameral legislature composed of the Philippine Commission (upper house) and the Philippine Assembly (lower house). Its key provisions included a bill of rights for the Filipinos and the appointment of two non-voting Filipino Resident Commissioner of the Philippines to represent the Philippines in the United States House of Representatives.

==== Philippine Autonomy Act of 1916 ====
The Philippine Autonomy Act of 1916, sometimes known as the "Jones Law", modified the structure of the Philippine government by removing the Philippine Commission as the legislative upper house and replacing it with a Senate elected by Filipino voters, creating the Philippines' first fully elected national legislature. This act also explicitly stated that it was and always had been the purpose of the people of the United States to renounce their sovereignty over the Philippine Islands and to recognize Philippine independence as soon as a stable government can be established therein.

==== Hare–Hawes–Cutting Act (1932) ====
Though not a constitution itself, the Hare–Hawes–Cutting Act of 1932 was the precursor the Tydings–McDuffie Act, which laid down the promise of independence to the Philippines after 10 years of transition period and other provisions; however, because of infighting within the Philippine Congress, it was not ratified and only became the basis for the creation of the Tydings–McDuffie Act.

==== Tydings–McDuffie Act (1934) ====
Though also not a constitution itself, the Tydings–McDuffie Act of 1934 provided for autonomy, specified requirements for a formal constitution and defined mechanisms for its establishment via a constitutional convention.

=== The 1935 Constitution ===
The 1935 Constitution was approved with the 1935 Philippine constitutional plebiscite. It was in effect during the Commonwealth of the Philippines (1935–1946) and later used by the Third Republic (1946–1972). It was written to meet requirements set forth in the Tydings–McDuffie Act to prepare the country for its independence.

The Commonwealth constitution was ratified to prepare the country for its independence. This constitution was predominantly influenced by the U.S. constitution, but possesses traces of the Malolos constitution as well as the German, Spanish, and Mexican constitutions, constitutions of several South American countries, and the unwritten constitution of England.

It originally provided for a unicameral legislature composed of a president and vice president elected for a six-year term without re-election. It was amended in 1940 to provide for a bicameral legislature composed of a Senate and a House of Representatives. The President is to be elected to a four-year term, together with the vice-president, with one re-election; the right of suffrage for male citizens of the Philippines who are twenty-one years of age or over and are able to read and write were protected; this protection, later on, extended to the right of suffrage for women two years after the adoption of the constitution.

The draft of the constitution was approved by the convention on February 8, 1935, and was ratified by President Roosevelt in Washington, D.C., on March 25, 1935. Elections were held on September 16, 1935, and Manuel L. Quezon was elected as the first President of the Commonwealth of the Philippines.

The Preamble reads:

"The Filipino people, imploring the aid of Divine Providence, in order to establish a government that shall embody their ideals, conserve and develop the patrimony of the nation, promote the general welfare, and secure to themselves and their posterity the blessings of independence under a regime of justice, liberty, and democracy, do ordain and promulgate this Constitution."

The original 1935 Constitution provided for a unicameral National Assembly, and the President was elected to a six-year term without the possibility of re-election. It was amended in 1940 to have a bicameral Congress composed of a Senate and House of Representatives, to create an independent electoral commission and to grant the President a four-year term with a maximum of two consecutive terms in office.

A Constitutional Convention was held in 1971 to rewrite the 1935 Constitution. The convention was stained with manifest bribery and corruption. Possibly the most controversial issue was removing the presidential term limit so that Ferdinand E. Marcos could seek re-election for a third term, which many felt was the true reason for which the convention was called. In any case, the 1935 Constitution was suspended in 1972 with Marcos' proclamation of martial law, the rampant corruption of the constitutional process providing him with one of his major premises for doing so.

=== The 1943 Constitution ===
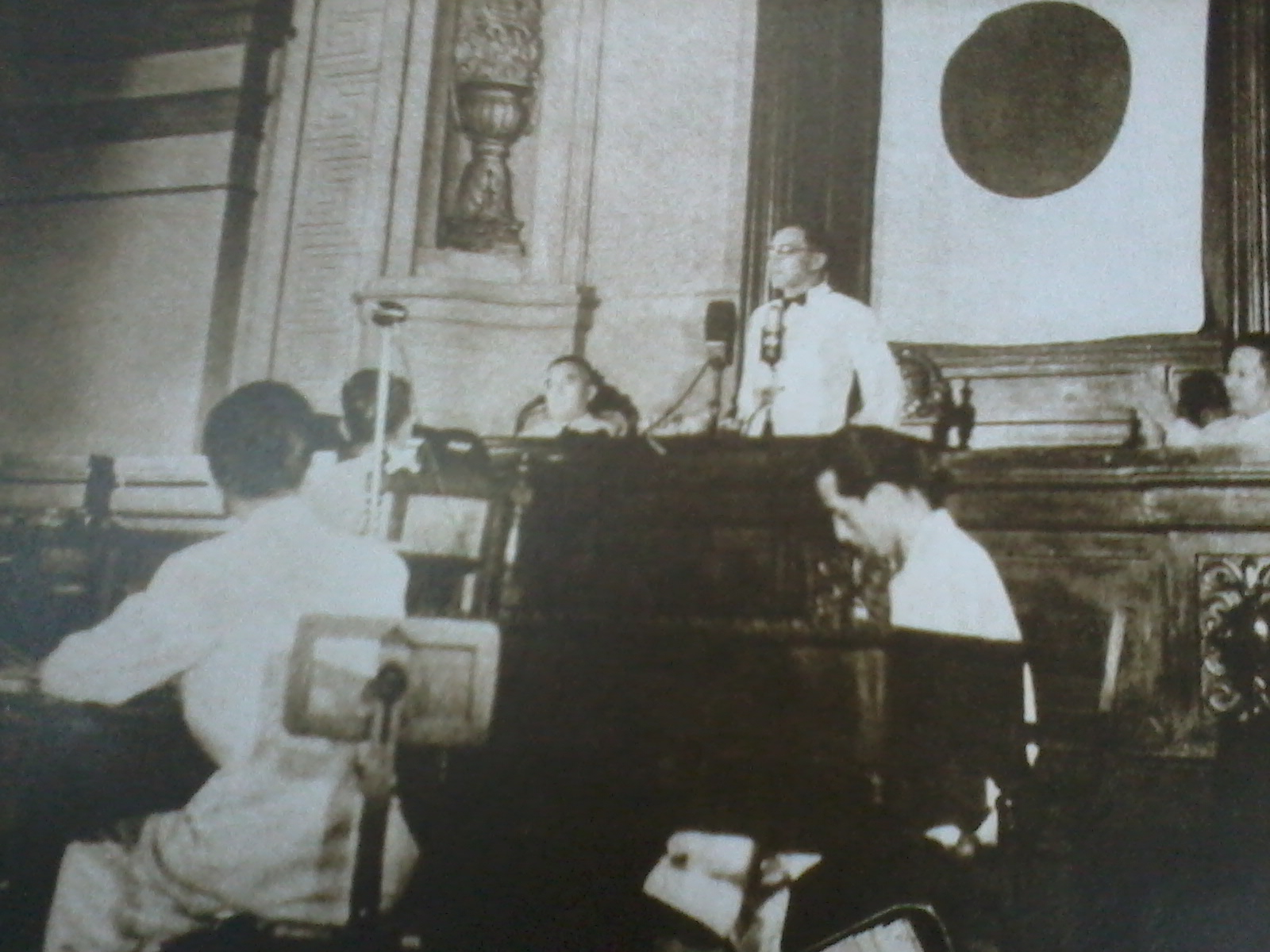
José P. Laurel, President of the Second Philippine Republic, addresses the National Assembly in what is now the Old Legislative Building to approve the 1943 Constitution.

The 1943 Constitution was drafted by a committee appointed by the Philippine Executive Commission, the body established by the Japanese to administer the Philippines in lieu of the Commonwealth of the Philippines which had established a government-in-exile. In mid-1942, Japanese Premier Hideki Tōjō promised the Filipinos "the honor of independence" which meant that the commission would be supplanted by a formal republic.

The Preparatory Committee for Philippine Independence tasked with drafting a new constitution was composed, in large part, of members of the prewar National Assembly and of individuals with experience as delegates to the convention that had drafted the 1935 Constitution. Their draft for the republic to be established under the Japanese occupation, however, would be limited in duration, provide for indirect, instead of direct, legislative elections, and an even stronger executive branch.

Upon the approval of the draft by the committee, the new charter was ratified in 1943 by an assembly of appointed, provincial representatives of the KALIBAPI, the fascist political party established by the Japanese to supplant all previous political parties. Upon the ratification by the Kalibapi assembly, the Second Republic was formally proclaimed (1943–1945). José P. Laurel was elected president by the National Assembly and sworn into office on October 14, 1943. Laurel was highly regarded by the Japanese for having openly criticized the U.S. for the way that they governed the Philippines and because he had a degree from the Tokyo Imperial University.

The 1943 Constitution remained in force in Japanese-controlled areas of the Philippines, but was never recognized as legitimate or binding by the governments of the United States, the Commonwealth of the Philippines, or the guerrilla organizations loyal to them. In late 1944, President Laurel declared war on the United States and the British Empire and proclaimed martial law, essentially ruling by decree. His government, in turn, went into exile in December 1944, first to Taiwan and then Japan. After the announcement of Japan's surrender, Laurel formally dissolved the Second Republic.

The Preamble reads:

"The Filipino people, imploring the aid of Divine Providence and desiring to lead a free national existence, do hereby proclaim their independence, and in order to establish a government that shall promote the general welfare, conserve and develop the patrimony of the Nation, and contribute to the creation of a world order based on peace, liberty, and moral justice, do ordain this Constitution."

The 1943 Constitution provided for strong executive powers. The Legislature consisted of a unicameral National Assembly and only those considered to be anti-US could stand for election, although in practice most legislators were appointed rather than elected.

Until the 1960s, the Second Republic and its officers were not viewed as a legitimate Philippine government or as having any standing with the exception of the Second Republic-era Supreme Court, whose decisions, limited to reviews of criminal and commercial cases as part of a policy of discretion by Chief Justice José Yulo, continued to be part of official records. This was made easier by the Commonwealth government-in-exile never constituting a Supreme Court, and the formal vacancy in the position of Chief Justice for the Commonwealth with the execution of José Abad Santos by the Japanese. It was only during the Macapagal administration that a partial political rehabilitation of the Japanese-era republic took place, with the official recognition of Laurel as a former president and the addition of his cabinet and other officials to the roster of past government officials. However, the 1943 Constitution was not taught in schools, and the laws of the 1943–44 National Assembly were never recognized as valid or relevant.

=== The 1973 Constitution ===
The 1973 Constitution was promulgated after Ferdinand Marcos' declaration of martial law and was supposed to introduce a parliamentary-style government. Legislative power was vested in a unicameral National Assembly whose members were elected for six-year terms. The president was ideally elected as the symbolic and purely ceremonial head of state chosen from amongst the Members of the National Assembly for a six-year term and could be re-elected to an unlimited number of terms. Upon election, the president ceased to be a Member of the National Assembly. During his term, the president was not allowed to be a member of a political party or hold any other office.

Executive power was meant to be exercised by the prime minister, who was also elected from among the sitting Assemblymen. The prime minister was to be the head of government and Commander-in-Chief of the Armed Forces. This constitution was subsequently amended four times (arguably five, depending on how one considers Proclamation No. 3 of 1986, see below).

From October 16–17, 1976, a majority of barangay voters (also called "Citizens' Assemblies") approved that martial law should be continued and ratified the amendments to the Constitution proposed by President Marcos. (Note: In Sanidad vs. Comelec, L-44640, October 12, 1976 the Supreme Court ruled that on the basis of absolute necessity both the constituent power (the power to formulate a Constitution or to propose amendments or revision to the Constitution and to ratify such proposal, which is exclusively vested to the National Assembly, the Constitutional Convention, and the electorate) and legislative powers of the legislature may be exercised by the Chief Executive.)

The 1976 amendments provided:

- for an Interim Batasang Pambansa (IBP) substituting for the Interim National Assembly;
- that the President would become Prime Minister and continue to exercise legislative powers until such time as martial law was lifted.

The Sixth Amendment authorized the President to legislate on his own on an "emergency" basis:

Whenever in the judgement of the President there exists a grave emergency or a threat or imminence thereof, or whenever the Interim Batasang Pambansa or the regular National Assembly fails or is unable to act adequately on any matter for any reason that in his judgment requires immediate action, he may, in order to meet the exigency, issue the necessary decrees, orders or letters of instructions, which shall form part of the law of the land.

The 1973 Constitution was further amended in 1980 and 1981. In the 1980 amendment, the retirement age of the members of the judiciary was extended to 70 years. In the 1981 amendments, the parliamentary system was formally modified into a French-style semi-presidential system and provided:

- that executive power was restored to the president;
- that direct election of the president was restored;
- for an executive committee composed of the prime minister and not more than 14 members was created to "assist the President in the exercise of his powers and functions and in the performance of his duties as he may prescribe;" and the prime minister was a mere head of the Cabinet.
- for electoral reforms and provided that a natural-born citizen of the Philippines who has lost his citizenship may be a transference of private land for use by him as his residence.

The last amendments in 1984 abolished the executive committee and restored the position of vice-president (which did not exist in the original, unamended 1973 Constitution).

While the 1973 Constitution ideally provided for a true parliamentary system, in practice, Marcos made use of subterfuge and manipulation in order to keep executive powers for himself, rather than devolving these to the Assembly and the cabinet headed by the prime minister. The result was that the final form of the 1973 Constitution – after all amendments and subtle manipulations – was merely the abolition of the Senate and a series of cosmetic rewordings. The old American-derived terminology was replaced by names more associated with a parliamentary government: for example, the House of Representatives became known as the "Batasang Pambansa" (National Assembly), departments became "ministries", and their cabinet secretaries became known as "cabinet ministers", with the president's assistant – the executive secretary – now being styled as the "prime minister". Marcos' purported parliamentary system functioned in practice as an authoritarian presidential system, with all real power concentrated in the hands of the President but with the premise that such was now constitutional.

=== The 1986 Freedom Constitution ===
Immediately following the 1986 People Power Revolution that ousted Marcos, President Corazon C. Aquino issued Proclamation No. 3 as a provisional constitution. Named the "Freedom Constitution", it was written by Justice Minister Neptali Gonzales, and it adopted certain provisions from the 1973 Constitution while abolishing others. It granted the President broad powers to reorganize government and remove officials, as well as mandating the president to appoint a commission to draft a new Constitution.

The "Freedom Constitution" was supplanted upon the ratification of the Philippine Constitution in early 1987. This is the transitional constitution that lasted a year and came before the constitution. It maintained many provisions of the 1973 Constitution, including in rewritten form the presidential right to rule by decree. The commission is composed of 48 members appointed by President Aquino.

== See also ==
- Constitutionalism
- Constitutional reform in the Philippines
