= Constituent assembly (Philippines) =

Method of proposing constitutional amendments in the Philippines

In the Philippines, a constituent assembly (sometimes shortened to con-ass) is one of the three ways by which amendments or revisions to the 1987 Constitution of the Philippines may be proposed. The other two are through a people's initiative and a constitutional convention. A constituent assembly is composed of all members of the bicameral Congress of the Philippines (Senate and the House of Representatives) and is convened by Congress to propose amendments to the 1987 Constitution. Under Article XVII of the Constitution of the Philippines, amendments pass upon a vote of three-fourths of all members of Congress, with Congress voting as separate houses on the amendment. The convention of Congress into the term "Constituent Assembly" is not explicitly provided for in the Constitution, since the term is not used in the Constitution and is only referred to as "Congress upon a vote of three-fourths of all its members".

The term also describes the exercise of constituent power by Congress to propose amendments to the 1987 Constitution.

== See also ==
- Constitutional reform in the Philippines
- Constitution of the Philippines

== Bibliography ==
- Cruz, Isagani (1995). "The Nature of the Constitution". Constitutional Law. Philippines: Central Lawbook Publishing Co., Inc. pp. 18–20. ISBN 971-16-0333-0.
