= Preparatory Committee for Philippine Independence =

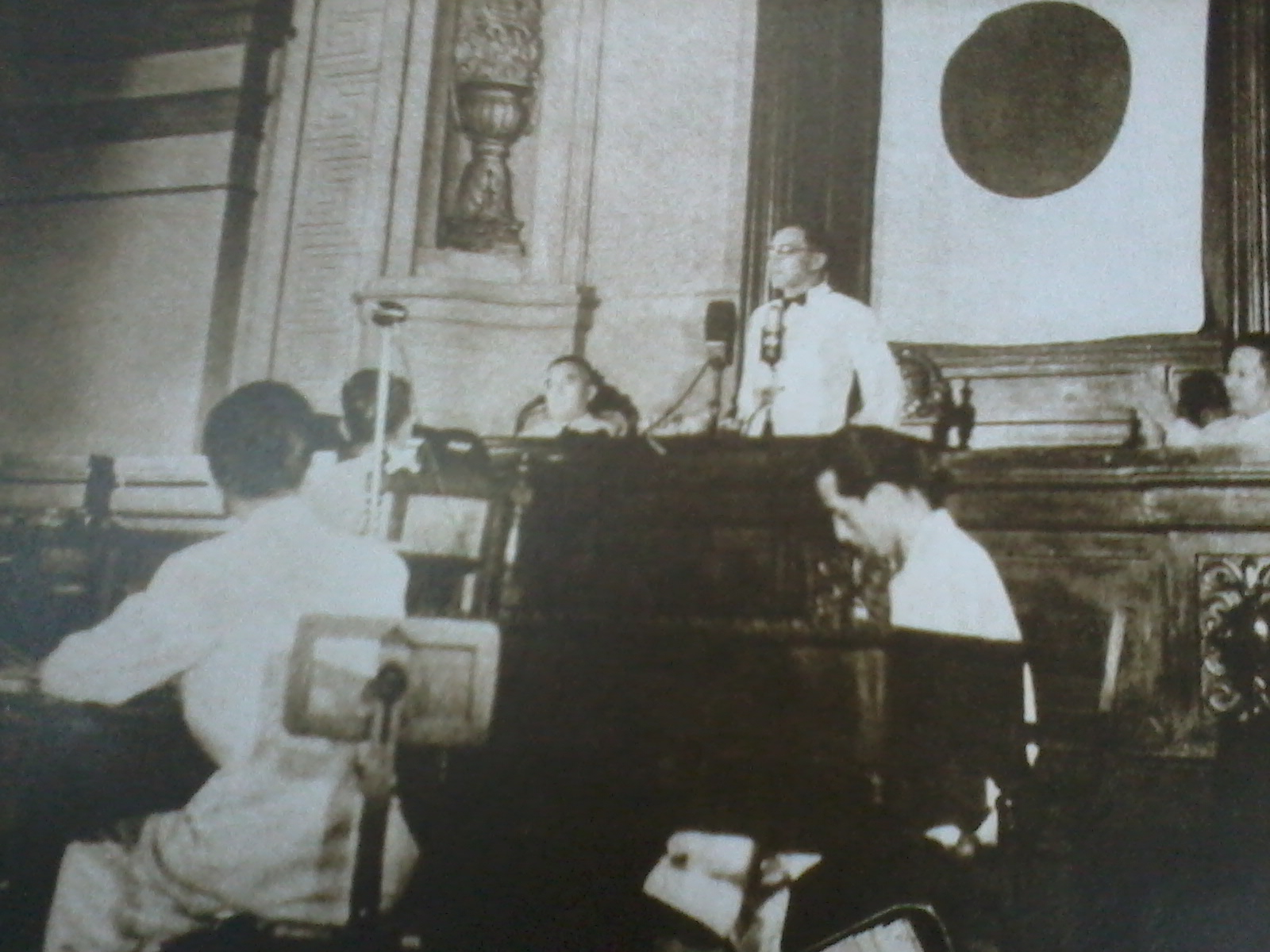
President Jose P. Laurel addresses to approve the 1943 constitution

The Preparatory Committee for Philippine Independence (PCPI) was the drafting body of the 1943 Philippine Constitution during the Japanese occupation of the Philippines during World War II. The constitution was signed and unanimously approved on September 4, 1943, by its members and was then ratified by a popular convention of the KALIBAPI in Manila on September 7, 1943.

== Background ==
In mid-1942, Japanese Premier Hideki Tōjō had promised the Filipinos "the honor of independence" which meant that the committee would be supplanted by a formal republic. The PCPI was welcomed by some, especially by Filipino nationalists who had long-awaited of a "Genuine Asiatic independence".

The PCPI was composed, in large part, of members of the prewar Philippine National Assembly and of individuals with experience as delegates to the convention that had drafted the 1935 Philippine Constitution. The 1943 draft constitution was limited in duration; provided for indirect election of the legislature; and a stronger executive branch.

== Leadership ==
=== Presidents ===
- José P. Laurel

=== Vice Presidents ===
- Benigno Aquino, Sr.
- Ramon Avanceña

=== Other members ===
- Jorge B. Vargas
- Antonio de las Alas
- Emilio Aguinaldo
- Claro M. Recto
- Quintin Paredes
- Jose Yulo
- Vicente Madrigal
- Manuel Roxas
- Alauya Alonto
- Emiliano Tria Tirona
- Melecio Arranz
- Camilo Osías
- Rafael Alunan Sr.
- Pedro Sabido
- Teofilo Sison
- Manuel C. Briones

== Drafting ==
1943 Constitution
Drafting	July 9 to September 4, 1943
Approval and Signing	September 4, 1943
Ratification	September 7, 1943
