= List of representatives elected in the 2010 Philippine House of Representatives election =

These are the representatives elected in the 2010 Philippine House of Representatives elections.

== District representatives ==
Seats highlighted in gray are districts in which boundaries were altered.

District	Incumbent party	Representative elected		Notes
Abra	Lakas–Kampi	Ma. Jocelyn Bernos	PDSP	New representative.
Agusan del Norte–1st	Lakas–Kampi	Jose Aquino II	Lakas–Kampi	Incumbent won reelection.
Agusan del Norte–2nd	Lakas–Kampi	Angelica Amante	Lakas–Kampi	New representative, daughter of previous representative.
Agusan del Sur–1st	NPC	Maria Valentina Plaza	Lakas–Kampi	New representative, sister of previous representative; new district; Rodolfo Plaza (NPC) previously held the lone district.
Agusan del Sur–2nd	NPC	Evelyn Mellana	Lakas–Kampi	New district; Rodolfo Plaza (NPC) previously held the lone district.
Aklan	Lakas–Kampi	Florencio Miraflores	Lakas–Kampi	Incumbent won reelection unopposed.
Albay–1st	Lakas–Kampi	Edcel Lagman	Lakas–Kampi	Incumbent won reelection.
Albay–2nd	Nacionalista	Al Francis Bichara	Nacionalista	Incumbent won reelection.
Albay–3rd	NPC	Fernando Gonzalez	Liberal	Defeated incumbent.
Antipolo City–1st	Lakas–Kampi	Roberto Puno	Lakas–Kampi	Incumbent won reelection.
Antipolo City–2nd	Lakas–Kampi	Romeo Acop	Independent	New representative.
Antique	Lakas–Kampi	Paolo Everardo Javier	Lakas–Kampi	New representative, son of previous representative.
Apayao	Lakas–Kampi	Eleanor Begtang	Lakas–Kampi	New representative, sister of previous representative.
Aurora	LDP	Juan Edgardo Angara	LDP	Incumbent won reelection.
Bacolod City	Lakas–Kampi	Anthony Rolando Golez, Jr.	NPC	New representative.
Baguio City	Lakas–Kampi	Bernardo Vergara	Lakas–Kampi	Former representative.
Basilan	Liberal	Hadjiman Hataman-Salliman	Independent	New representative; incumbent Wahab Akbar died in office.
Bataan–1st	Lakas–Kampi	Herminia Roman	Lakas–Kampi	Incumbent won reelection.
Bataan–2nd	Lakas–Kampi	Albert Garcia	Lakas–Kampi	Incumbent won reelection.
Batanes	Lakas–Kampi	Henedina Abad	Liberal	Defeated incumbent.
Batangas–1st	Lakas–Kampi	Tomas Apacible	Liberal	New representative.
Batangas–2nd	Liberal	Hermilando Mandanas	Liberal	Incumbent won reelection.
Batangas–3rd	Lakas–Kampi	Nelson Collantes	PMP	New representative.
Batangas–4th	NPC	Mark Llandro Mendoza	NPC	Incumbent won reelection unopposed.
Benguet	Lakas–Kampi	Ronald Cosalan	Liberal	Former representative.
Biliran	Lakas–Kampi	Rogelio Espina	Nacionalista	Defeated incumbent.
Bohol–1st	Lakas–Kampi	Rene Relampagos	LDP	New representative.
Bohol–2nd	Independent	Erico Aumentado	Independent	New representative.
Bohol–3rd	Lakas–Kampi	Arthur Yap	Lakas–Kampi	New representative, elected unopposed.
Bukidnon–1st	Lakas–Kampi	Jesus Emmanuel Paras	NPC	Defeated incumbent.
Bukidnon–2nd	Liberal	Florencio Flores, Jr.	Lakas–Kampi	New representative.
Bukidnon–3rd	Lakas–Kampi	Jose Maria Zubiri III	Lakas–Kampi	Incumbent won reelection.
Bulacan–1st	Lakas–Kampi	Ma. Victoria Sy-Alvarado	Lakas–Kampi	Incumbent won reelection; election deferred for six months after the annulment of the creation of a separate Malolos district.
Bulacan–2nd	Lakas–Kampi	Pedro Pancho	Lakas–Kampi	Incumbent won reelection.
Bulacan–3rd	Lakas–Kampi	Joselito Andrew Mendoza	Liberal	New incumbent.
Bulacan–4th	Lakas–Kampi	Linabelle Ruth Villarica	Liberal	New incumbent.
Cagayan–1st	NPC	Juan Ponce Enrile, Jr.	NPC	Incumbent won reelection.
Cagayan–2nd	Lakas–Kampi	Florencio Vargas	Lakas–Kampi	Incumbent won reelection; died on July 22, 2010.
Cagayan–3rd	Liberal	Randolph Ting	Lakas–Kampi	New representative.
Cagayan de Oro City–1st	Lakas–Kampi	Jose Benjamin Benaldo	PMP	New representative.
Cagayan de Oro City–2nd	PMP	Rufus Rodriguez	PMP	Incumbent won reelection.
Caloocan–1st	Nacionalista	Oscar Malapitan	Nacionalista	Incumbent won reelection.
Caloocan–2nd	Lakas–Kampi	Mitzi Cajayon	Lakas–Kampi	Incumbent won reelection.
Camarines Norte–1st	Liberal	Renato Unico, Jr.	Lakas–Kampi	New representative; new district, Liwayway Vinzons-Chato (Liberal) previously held the lone district.
Camarines Norte–2nd	Liberal	Elmer Panotes	Lakas–Kampi	Defeated incumbent; new district, incumbent Liwayway Vinzons-Chato (Liberal) ran in this district.
Camarines Sur–1st	Lakas–Kampi	Rolando Andaya, Jr.	Lakas–Kampi	Former representative; old first district split into two districts that will comprise the new first and second districts. Incumbent Diosdado Macapagal–Arroyo (Lakas-Kampi) at the new second district.
Camarines Sur–2nd	Lakas–Kampi	Diosdado Macapagal-Arroyo	Lakas–Kampi	Incumbent won reelection; previously a part of the old first district. Old first district incumbent Diosdado Macapagal–Arroyo ran here.
Camarines Sur–3rd	NPC	Luis Villafuerte, Sr.	NPC	Incumbent won reelection; the old second district is renamed to the new third district.
Camarines Sur–4th	NPC	Arnulfo Fuentebella	NPC	Incumbent won reelection; the old third district is renamed to the new fourth district.
Camarines Sur–5th	Nacionalista	Salvio Fortuno	Nacionalista	New representative; the old fourth district is renamed to the new fifth district.
Camiguin	Lakas–Kampi	Pedro Romualdo	Lakas–Kampi	Incumbent won reelection.
Capiz–1st	Liberal	Antonio Del Rosario	Liberal	Incumbent won reelection.
Capiz–2nd	Lakas–Kampi	Jane Castro	Lakas–Kampi	New representative, wife of previous representative
Catanduanes	NPC	Cesar Sarmiento	Liberal	New representative.
Cavite–1st	Liberal	Joseph Emilio Abaya	Liberal	Incumbent won reelection; Bacoor was separated from the first district and is the new second district.
Cavite–2nd	Liberal	Lani Revilla	Lakas–Kampi	New representative: the old second district and a part of the third district are redistricted into five new districts.
Cavite–3rd	Lakas–Kampi	Erineo Maliksi	Liberal	Former representative.
Dasmarinas (Cavite–4th)	Lakas–Kampi	Elpidio Barzaga, Jr.	Lakas–Kampi	Incumbent won reelection; old second district representative Elpidio Barzaga, Jr. ran in the fourth district (Dasmarinas).
Cavite–5th	Lakas–Kampi	Roy Loyola	Liberal	New representative.
Cavite–6th	Lakas–Kampi	Antonio Ferrer	Lakas–Kampi	New representative.
Cavite–7th	Nacionalista	Jesus Crispin Remulla	Nacionalista	Incumbent won reelection; Most of the old third district became the new seventh district, except for Amadeo (6th) and Silang (5th).
Cebu–1st	Nacionalista	Eduardo Gullas	Nacionalista	Incumbent won reelection.
Cebu–2nd	Lakas–Kampi	Pablo Garcia	Lakas–Kampi	Incumbent won reelection.
Cebu–3rd	Lakas–Kampi	Pablo John Garcia	Lakas–Kampi	Incumbent won reelection.
Cebu–4th	Lakas–Kampi	Benhur Salimbangon	Lakas–Kampi	Incumbent won reelection.
Cebu–5th	NPC	Ramon Durano VI	NPC	Incumbent won reelection.
Cebu–6th	Nacionalista	Gabriel Luis Quisumbing	Lakas–Kampi	New representative; Lapu-Lapu City district carved out from this district.
Cebu City–1st	Liberal	Rachel del Mar	Liberal	New representative, daughter of previous representative
Cebu City–2nd	Lakas–Kampi	Tomas Osmeña	Liberal	New representative.
Compostela Valley–1st	Nacionalista	Maria Carmen Zamora	Nacionalista	New representative, daughter of previous representative.
Compostela Valley–2nd	Lakas–Kampi	Rommel Amatong	Lakas–Kampi	Incumbent won reelection.
Cotabato–1st	Lakas–Kampi	Jesus Sacdalan	Lakas–Kampi	New representative.
Cotabato–2nd	Liberal	Nancy Catamco	Lakas–Kampi	Defeated incumbent.
Davao City–1st	Lakas–Kampi	Karlo Alexei Nograles	Lakas–Kampi	New representative, son of previous representative.
Davao City–2nd	Lakas–Kampi	Mylene Garcia-Albano	Independent	New representative, sister of previous representative.
Davao City–3rd	Liberal	Isidro Ungab	Liberal	Incumbent won reelection.
Davao del Norte–1st	Lakas–Kampi	Antonio Rafael del Rosario	Liberal	New representative.
Davao del Norte–2nd	Lakas–Kampi	Antonio Lagdameo, Jr.	Lakas–Kampi	Incumbent won reelection unopposed.
Davao del Sur–1st	Nacionalista	Marc Douglas Cagas IV	Nacionalista	Incumbent won reelection.
Davao del Sur–2nd	Lakas–Kampi	Franklin Bautista	Lakas–Kampi	Incumbent won reelection.
Davao Oriental–1st	Nacionalista	Nelson Dayanghirang	Nacionalista	Incumbent won reelection unopposed.
Davao Oriental–2nd	Lakas–Kampi	Thelma Almario	Lakas–Kampi	Incumbent won reelection.
Dinagat Islands	Lakas–Kampi	Ruben Ecleo, Jr.	Lakas–Kampi	Incumbent won reelection.
Eastern Samar	Independent	Ben Evardone	Independent	Defeated incumbent Teodulo Coquilla, who was not nominated by Lakas-Kampi and ran as an independent.
Guimaras	Lakas–Kampi	Joaquin Carlos Rahman Nava	Lakas–Kampi	Incumbent won reelection.
Ifugao	Lakas–Kampi	Teodoro Baguilat, Jr.	Liberal	New representative.
Iligan City	Liberal	Vicente Belmonte, Jr.	Liberal	Incumbent won reelection; new district carved out of Lanao del Norte's 1st district.
Ilocos Norte–1st	Lakas–Kampi	Rodolfo Fariñas	Nacionalista	Former representative.
Ilocos Norte–2nd	Nacionalista	Imelda Marcos	KBL	Former representative, mother of previous representative.
Ilocos Sur–1st	Lakas–Kampi	Ronald Singson	Lakas–Kampi	Incumbent won reelection; resigned in March 2011.
Ilocos Sur–2nd	Lakas–Kampi	Eric Singson, Jr.	Lakas–Kampi	Incumbent won reelection.
Iloilo–1st	Lakas–Kampi	Janette Garin	Lakas–Kampi	Incumbent won reelection unopposed.
Iloilo–2nd	Lakas–Kampi	Augusto Syjuco, Jr.	Lakas–Kampi	Former representative, husband of previous representative.
Iloilo–3rd	Lakas–Kampi	Arthur Defensor, Jr.	Lakas–Kampi	New representative, son of previous representative.
Iloilo–4th	Nacionalista	Ferjenel Biron	Nacionalista	Incumbent won reelection.
Iloilo–5th	Liberal	Niel Tupas, Jr.	Liberal	Incumbent won reelection.
Iloilo City	Lakas–Kampi	Jerry Treñas	Nacionalista	New representative.
Isabela–1st	Lakas–Kampi	Rodolfo Albano, Jr.	Lakas–Kampi	Former representative, father of previous representative.
Isabela–2nd	Liberal	Anna Cristina Go	Nacionalista	New representative.
Isabela–3rd	Lakas–Kampi	Napoleon Dy	Lakas–Kampi	New representative, brother of previous representative.
Isabela–4th	NPC	Giorgidi Aggabao	NPC	Incumbent won reelection.
Kalinga	Lakas–Kampi	Manuel Agyao	Lakas–Kampi	Incumbent won reelection.
La Union–1st	Lakas–Kampi	Victor Francisco Ortega	Lakas–Kampi	Incumbent won reelection unopposed.
La Union–2nd	Lakas–Kampi	Eufranio Eriguel	NPC	Defeated incumbent.
Laguna–1st	Lakas–Kampi	Danilo Fernandez	Lakas–Kampi	New representative; disqualified after winning in 2007.
Laguna–2nd	Nacionalista	Justin Marc Chipeco	Nacionalista	Incumbent won reelection.
Laguna–3rd	Liberal	Maria Evita Arago	Liberal	Incumbent won reelection.
Laguna–4th	NPC	Edgar San Luis	NPC	Incumbent won reelection unopposed.
Lanao del Norte–1st	Liberal	Imelda Dimaporo	Lakas–Kampi	New representative; Iligan district carved out from this district; incumbent representative Vicente Belmonte (Liberal) ran there.
Lanao del Norte–2nd	Lakas–Kampi	Fatima Aliah Dimaporo	Lakas–Kampi	New representative, daughter of previous representative.
Lanao del Sur–1st	Nacionalista	Mohammed Hussein Pacsum Pangandaman	Lakas–Kampi	New representative.
Lanao del Sur–2nd	Lakas–Kampi	Pangalian Balindong	Lakas–Kampi	Incumbent won reelection.
Lapu-Lapu City	Nacionalista	Arturo Radaza	Lakas–Kampi	New representative; carved out of Cebu's 6th district.
Las Piñas City	Nacionalista	Mark Villar	Nacionalista	New representative, son of previous representative.
Leyte–1st	Lakas–Kampi	Ferdinand Martin Romualdez	Lakas–Kampi	Incumbent won reelection.
Leyte–2nd	Lakas–Kampi	Sergio Antonio Apostol	Lakas–Kampi	Former representative, husband of previous representative.
Leyte–3rd	Lakas–Kampi	Andres Salvacion, Jr.	Lakas–Kampi	Incumbent won reelection.
Leyte–4th	Lakas–Kampi	Lucy Torres-Gomez	Liberal	New representative.
Leyte–5th	Lakas–Kampi	Jose Carlos Cari	Lakas–Kampi	New representative, son of previous representative, won election unopposed.
Maguindanao–1st	Independent	Bai Sandra Sema	Lakas–Kampi	Defeated incumbent.
Maguindanao–2nd	Lakas–Kampi	Simeon Datumanong	Lakas–Kampi	Incumbent won reelection unopposed.
Makati City–1st	PDP–Laban	Monique Yazmin Lagdameo	PDP–Laban	New representative.
Makati City–2nd	PDP–Laban	Marlen Abigail Binay	PDP–Laban	Incumbent won reelection.
Malabon	NPC	Josephine Lacson-Noel	NPC	Incumbent won reelection; Malabon/Navotas district split into Malabon and Navotas districts.
Mandaluyong	Liberal	Neptali Gonzales II	Liberal	Incumbent won reelection unopposed.
Manila–1st	Liberal	Benjamin Asilo	KKK	Incumbent won reelection.
Manila–2nd	Liberal	Carlo Lopez	KKK	New representative, son of previous representative.
Manila–3rd	NPC	Maria Zenaida Angping	NPC	Incumbent won reelection.
Manila–4th	Lakas–Kampi	Maria Theresa David	Lakas–Kampi	Incumbent won reelection.
Manila–5th	KABAKA	Amado Bagatsing	KABAKA	Incumbent won reelection.
Manila–6th	Lakas–Kampi	Rosenda Ann Ocampo	Liberal	Defeated incumbent.
Marikina–1st	Liberal	Marcelino Teodoro	Independent	Incumbent won reelection.
Marikina–2nd	Independent	Miro Quimbo	Liberal	New representative.
Marinduque	Liberal	Lord Allan Jay Velasco	Lakas–Kampi	New representative.
Masbate–1st	Lakas–Kampi	Narciso Bravo, Jr.	Lakas–Kampi	Incumbent won reelection.
Masbate–2nd	Lakas–Kampi	Antonio Kho	Lakas–Kampi	Incumbent won reelection.
Masbate–3rd	NPC	Scott Davies Lanete	NPC	New representative, son of previous representative.
Misamis Occidental–1st	Nacionalista	Jorge Almonte	Lakas–Kampi	New representative.
Misamis Occidental–2nd	Lakas–Kampi	Loreto Leo Ocampos	Liberal	New representative.
Misamis Oriental–1st	Lakas	Peter Unabia	PMP	New representative; incumbent Danilo Lagbas (Lakas-CMD, predecessor of Lakas Kampi CMD) died while in office.
Misamis Oriental–2nd	Nacionalista	Yevgeny Vincente Emano	Nacionalista	Incumbent won reelection.
Mountain Province	KAMPI	Maximo Dalog	Lakas–Kampi	New representative; Victor Dominguez (KAMPI, predecessor of Lakas Kampi CMD) died while in office.
Muntinlupa	Liberal	Rodolfo Biazon	Liberal	New representative; father of previous representative.
Navotas	NPC	Toby Tiangco	Navoteño	New representative; Malabon/Navotas district split into Malabon and Navotas districts. Incumbent Josephine Lacson-Noel ran in the Malabon district.
Negros Occidental–1st	NPC	Julio Ledesma IV	NPC	Incumbent won reelection.
Negros Occidental–2nd	Lakas–Kampi	Alfredo Marañon III	Lakas–Kampi	Incumbent won reelection.
Negros Occidental–3rd	Lakas–Kampi	Alfredo Abelardo Benitez	NPC	New representative.
Negros Occidental–4th	NPC	Jeffrey Ferrer	NPC	Incumbent won reelection.
Negros Occidental–5th	Lakas–Kampi	Iggy Arroyo	Lakas–Kampi	Incumbent won reelection.
Negros Occidental–6th	NPC	Mercedes Alvarez	NPC	New representative, daughter of previous representative.
Negros Oriental–1st	Liberal	Jocelyn Limkaichong	Liberal	Incumbent won reelection.
Negros Oriental–2nd	NPC	George Arnaiz	NPC	Incumbent won reelection.
Negros Oriental–3rd	Lakas–Kampi	Pryde Henry Teves	Lakas–Kampi	Incumbent won reelection.
Northern Samar–1st	Liberal	Raul Daza	Liberal	Incumbent won reelection.
Northern Samar–2nd	Lakas–Kampi	Emil Ong	Lakas–Kampi	Incumbent won reelection.
Nueva Ecija–1st	Independent	Josefina Joson	NPC	New representative, sister of previous representative.
Nueva Ecija–2nd	Lakas–Kampi	Joseph Gilbert Violago	Lakas–Kampi	Incumbent won reelection.
Nueva Ecija–3rd	Lakas–Kampi	Czarina Umali	Lakas–Kampi	Incumbent won reelection.
Nueva Ecija–4th	Lakas–Kampi	Rodolfo Antonio	Lakas–Kampi	Incumbent won reelection.
Nueva Vizcaya	Nacionalista	Carlos M. Padilla	Nacionalista	Incumbent won reelection.
Occidental Mindoro	Lakas–Kampi	Ma. Amelita Villarosa	Lakas–Kampi	Incumbent won reelection.
Oriental Mindoro–1st	Lakas–Kampi	Rodolfo Valencia	Lakas–Kampi	Incumbent won reelection.
Oriental Mindoro–2nd	Liberal	Reynaldo Umali	Liberal	New representative, brother of previous representative.
Palawan–1st	Lakas–Kampi	Antonio Alvarez	Lakas–Kampi	Incumbent won reelection.
Palawan–2nd	Liberal	Victorino Dennis Socrates	NPC	New representative.
Pampanga–1st	Lakas–Kampi	Carmelo Lazatin	Lakas–Kampi	Incumbent won reelection.
Pampanga–2nd	Lakas–Kampi	Gloria Macapagal Arroyo	Lakas–Kampi	New representative, mother of previous representative.
Pampanga–3rd	Lakas–Kampi	Aurelio Gonzales, Jr.	Lakas–Kampi	Incumbent won reelection.
Pampanga–4th	Nacionalista	Anna York Bondoc	Nacionalista	Incumbent won reelection.
Pangasinan–1st	Lakas–Kampi	Jesus Celeste	Lakas–Kampi	New representative, brother of previous representative.
Pangasinan–2nd	Liberal	Leopoldo Bataoil	Lakas–Kampi	New representative.
Pangasinan–3rd	Lakas–Kampi	Maria Rachel Arenas	Lakas–Kampi	Incumbent won reelection.
Pangasinan–4th	Independent	Gina de Venecia	NPC	New representative, wife of previous representative.
Pangasinan–5th	NPC	Carmen Cojuangco	NPC	New representative, wife of previous representative.
Pangasinan–6th	NPC	Marlyn Aggabas	NPC	New representative.
Parañaque City–1st	Nacionalista	Edwin Olivarez	Liberal	New representative.
Parañaque City–2nd	Liberal	Roilo Golez	Liberal	Incumbent won reelection.
Pasay	Lakas–Kampi	Imelda Rubiano	Liberal	Defeated incumbent.
Pasig	Lakas–Kampi	Roman Romulo	Lakas–Kampi	Incumbent won reelection.
Quezon–1st	Nacionalista	Wilfrido Mark Enverga	Nacionalista	Incumbent won reelection.
Quezon–2nd	Liberal	Irvin Alcala	Liberal	New representative, son of previous representative.
Quezon–3rd	Lakas–Kampi	Danilo Suarez	Lakas–Kampi	Incumbent won reelection.
Quezon–4th	Liberal	Lorenzo Tañada III	Liberal	Incumbent won reelection unopposed.
Quezon City–1st	Nacionalista	Vincent Crisologo	Nacionalista	Incumbent won reelection.
Quezon City–2nd	PMP	Winston Castelo	Liberal	New representative.
Quezon City–3rd	Lakas–Kampi	Jorge John Banal, Jr.	Liberal	Defeated incumbent.
Quezon City–4th	Liberal	Feliciano Belmonte, Jr.	Liberal	Former representative.
Quirino	Lakas–Kampi	Dakila Carlo Cua	Lakas–Kampi	New representative, son of previous representative.
Rizal–1st	NPC	Joel Roy Duavit	NPC	New representative, relative of previous representative.
Rizal–2nd	NPC	Isidro Rodriguez, Jr.	NPC	Former representative.
Romblon	Nacionalista	Eleandro Jesus Madrona	Nacionalista	Incumbent won reelection.
Samar–1st	Lakas–Kampi	Mel Senen Sarmiento	Lakas–Kampi	New representative.
Samar–2nd	Lakas–Kampi	Milagrosa Tan	Lakas–Kampi	New representative, mother of previous representative.
San Jose del Monte City	Lakas–Kampi	Arturo Robes	Lakas–Kampi	Incumbent won reelection.
San Juan City	Nacionalista	Joseph Victor Ejercito	PMP	New representative.
Sarangani	SARRO	Manny Pacquiao	PCM	New representative.
Siquijor	Lakas–Kampi	Orlando Fua	Lakas–Kampi	Incumbent won reelection.
Sorsogon–1st	Liberal	Salvador Escudero III	Liberal	Incumbent won reelection.
Sorsogon–2nd	Liberal	Deogracias Ramos, Jr.	Liberal	New representative.
South Cotabato–1st	NPC	Pedro Acharon, Jr.	NPC	New representative.
South Cotabato–2nd	NPC	Daisy Avance-Fuentes	NPC	Former representative.
Southern Leyte	Lakas–Kampi	Roger Mercado	Lakas–Kampi	Incumbent won reelection.
Sultan Kudarat–1st	Lakas–Kampi	Raden Sakaluran	Independent	Defeated incumbent.
Sultan Kudarat–2nd	Lakas–Kampi	Arnulfo Go	Lakas–Kampi	Incumbent won reelection.
Sulu–1st	NPC	Tupay Loong	Lakas–Kampi	Defeated incumbent.
Sulu–2nd	Lakas–Kampi	Nur-Ana Sahidulla	NPC	New representative.
Surigao del Norte–1st	Lakas–Kampi	Francisco Matugas	Lakas–Kampi	Incumbent won reelection.
Surigao del Norte–2nd	Lakas–Kampi	Guillermo Romarate, Jr.	Lakas–Kampi	Incumbent won reelection.
Surigao del Sur–1st	Lakas–Kampi	Philip Pichay	Lakas–Kampi	Incumbent won reelection.
Surigao del Sur–2nd	Nacionalista	Florencio Garay	Nacionalista	Incumbent won reelection.
Taguig City–1st & Pateros	Nacionalista	Arnel Cerafica	Liberal	New representative.
Taguig City–2nd	Lingkod Taguig	Sigfrido Tiñga	Liberal	New representative.
Tarlac–1st	Lakas–Kampi	Enrique Cojuangco	NPC	New representative.
Tarlac–2nd	Lakas–Kampi	Susan Sulit	Lakas–Kampi	New representative, daughter of incumbent Jose Yap (Lakas Kampi CMD) who died while in office.
Tarlac–3rd	Lakas–Kampi	Jeci Lapus	Lakas–Kampi	Incumbent won reelection.
Tawi-Tawi	Lakas–Kampi	Nur Jaafar	Lakas–Kampi	Incumbent won reelection.
Valenzuela City–1st	NPC	Rexlon Gatchalian	NPC	Incumbent won reelection.
Valenzuela City–2nd	Lakas–Kampi	Magtanggol Gunigundo	Lakas–Kampi	Incumbent won reelection.
Zambales–1st	Lakas–Kampi	Maria Milagros Magsaysay	Lakas–Kampi	Incumbent won reelection.
Zambales–2nd	LM	Antonio Diaz	LM	Incumbent won reelection; died August 3, 2011.
Zamboanga City–1st	Liberal	Maria Isabelle Climaco Salazar	Liberal	Incumbent won reelection.
Zamboanga City–2nd	Nacionalista	Erico Basilio Fabian	Nacionalista	Incumbent won reelection.
Zamboanga del Norte–1st	Lakas–Kampi	Bullet Jalosjos	Lakas–Kampi	New representative, son of previous representative.
Zamboanga del Norte–2nd	Liberal	Rosendo Labadlabad	Liberal	Incumbent won reelection.
Zamboanga del Norte–3rd	Lakas–Kampi	Cesar Jalosjos	Lakas–Kampi	Incumbent won reelection.
Zamboanga del Sur–1st	NPC	Victor J. Yu	NPC	Incumbent won reelection.
Zamboanga del Sur–2nd	Lakas–Kampi	Aurora Cerilles	Lakas–Kampi	New representative, wife of previous representative.
Zamboanga Sibugay–1st	Lakas–Kampi	Jonathan Yambao	Nacionalista	New representative.
Zamboanga Sibugay–2nd	Lakas–Kampi	Romeo Jalosjos, Jr.	Nacionalista	New representative.

== Party-list representatives ==
Elected via closed lists, each party can return up to three representatives. If the person quits the party, the representative also loses one's seat. In any vacancy, the person next in line assumes the party's seat. For changes after the first seat was awarded for a party, see Change of seats in the 15th Congress.

- 1-CARE
  - Salvadore Cabaluna III
  - Michael Angelo Rivera
- 1-UTAK
  - Homero Mercado
- A TEACHER
  - Julieta Cortuna
  - Mariano Piamonte, Jr.
- AAMBIS-Owa
  - Sharon Garin
- Aangat Tayo
  - Daryl Grace Abayon
- Abante Mindanao
  - Maximo Rodriguez Jr.
- Abono
  - Robert Raymond Estrella
- ABS
  - Catalina Leonen-Pizarro
- Alliance of Concerned Teachers
  - Antonio Tinio
- AGAP
  - Nicanor Briones
- Agbiag
  - Patricio Antonio
- AGHAM
  - Angelo Palmones
- AGP
  - Mikey Arroyo
- Akbayan
  - Kaka Bag-ao
  - Walden Bello
- AKB
  - Rodel Batocabe
  - Christopher Co
  - Alfredo Garbin, Jr.
- Alagad
  - Rodel Batocabe
- ALE
  - Catalina Bagasina
- ALIF
  - Acmad Tomawis
- An Waray
  - Neil Benedict Montejo
  - Florencio Noel
- ANAD
  - Pastor Alcover, Jr.
- Anakpawis
  - Rafael V. Mariano
- Ang Kasangga
  - Teodorico Haresco Jr.
- APEC
  - Ponciano Payuyo
- ATING Koop
  - Isidro Lico
- AVE
  - Eulogio Magsaysay
- Bagong Henerasyon
  - Bernadette Herrera-Dy
- Bayan Muna
  - Teddy Casiño
  - Neri Colmenares
- Buhay
  - Erwin Tieng
  - Michael Velarde, Jr.
- Butil
  - Agapito Guanlao
- CIBAC
  - Cinchoma Cruz-Gonzales
  - Sherwin Tugna
- Coop-NATCCO
  - Jose R. Ping-ay
  - Cresente Paez
- DIWA
  - Emmeline Aglipay
- GABRIELA
  - Emeranciana de Jesus
  - Luzviminda Ilagan
- Kabataan
  - Raymond Palatino
- KAKUSA
  - Ranulfo Canonigo
- Kalinga
  - Abigail Faye Ferriol
- Kasosyo
  - Solaiman Pangandaman
- LPG Markerters Association
  - Arnel Ty
- PBA
  - Mark Aeron Sambar
- Senior Citizens
  - Godofredo Arquiza
  - David Kho
- TUCP
  - Raymond Democrito Mendoza
- Una ang Pamilya
  - Reena Concepcion Obillo
- YACAP
  - Carol Jayne Lopez

== See also ==
- List of senators elected in the Philippine Senate election, 2010
