= List of representatives elected in the 2019 Philippine House of Representatives elections =

These are the representatives elected in the Philippine House of Representatives elections, 2019 Seats highlighted in gray are districts in which boundaries were altered.

== Luzon ==
=== National Capital Region ===
| District | Incumbent party | Representative elected | | Notes |
|---|---|---|---|---|
| Caloocan-1st | PDP–Laban | Dale Gonzalo Malapitan | PDP–Laban | Incumbent won reelection. |
| Caloocan-2nd | Liberal | Edgar Erice | Liberal | Incumbent won reelection. |
| Las Piñas | Nacionalista | Camille Villar | Nacionalista | New representative; sister of immediate predecessor. |
| Makati-1st | PDP–Laban | Romulo "Kid" Peña, Jr. | Liberal | New representative; former acting Makati mayor. |
| Makati-2nd | UNA | Luis Campos | NPC | Incumbent won reelection. |
| Malabon | NPC | Josephine Lacson-Noel | NPC | Former representative. Defeated incumbent |
| Mandaluyong | PDP–Laban | Neptali Gonzales II | PDP–Laban | Former representative; husband of predecessor. Won unopposed. |
| Manila-1st | NPC | Manny Lopez | NPC | Incumbent won reelection. |
| Manila-2nd | Liberal | Rolan Valeriano | Asenso | New representative; former councilor. |
| Manila-3rd | PDP–Laban | John Marvin “Yul Servo” Nieto | PDP–Laban | Incumbent won reelection. |
| Manila-4th | PMP | Edward Maceda | PMP | Incumbent won reelection. |
| Manila-5th | KABAKA | Amanda Christina Bagatsing | KABAKA | Incumbent won reelection. |
| Manila-6th | Bagumbayan | Bienvenido Abante | Asenso | Former representative. |
| Marikina-1st | NPC | Bayani Fernando | NPC | Incumbent won reelection. |
| Marikina-2nd | Liberal | Stella Quimbo | Liberal | New representative; wife of predecessor. |
| Muntinlupa | PDP–Laban | Rozzano Rufino Biazon | PDP–Laban | Incumbent won reelection. |
| Navotas | Navoteño | John Rey Tiangco | Navoteño | New representative; brother of predecessor. |
| Parañaque-1st | PDP–Laban | Eric Olivarez | PDP–Laban | Incumbent won reelection. |
| Parañaque-2nd | PDP–Laban | Joy Tambuting | PDP–Laban | New representative; wife of predecessor. |
| Pasay | PDP–Laban | Antonino Calixto | PDP–Laban | New representative; brother of predecessor. |
| Pasig | Nacionalista | Roman Romulo | Aksyon | Former representative. Defeated incumbent. |
| Quezon City-1st District | PDP–Laban | Anthony Peter Crisologo | PDP–Laban | New representative; son of predecessor. |
| Quezon City-2nd District | NPC | Precious Hipolito-Castelo | NPC | New representative; wife of predecessor. |
| Quezon City-3rd District | Hugpong | Allan Benedict Reyes | PFP | New representative; former councilor. |
| Quezon City-4th District | Liberal | Jesus Suntay | PDP–Laban | New representative; former councilor. |
| Quezon City-5th District | PDP–Laban | Alfredo Paolo Vargas III | PDP–Laban | Incumbent won reelection. |
| Quezon City-6th District | Liberal | Jose Christopher Belmonte | Liberal | Incumbent won reelection. |
| San Juan | PDP–Laban | Ronaldo Zamora | PDP–Laban | Incumbent won reelection. |
| Taguig-Pateros | Liberal | Alan Peter Cayetano | Nacionalista | Former representative. |
| Taguig | Nacionalista | Lani Cayetano | Nacionalista | New representative; sister-in-law of predecessor. |
| Valenzuela-1st District | NPC | Weslie Gatchalian | NPC | Incumbent won reelection. |
| Valenzuela-2nd District | PDP–Laban | Eric Martinez | PDP–Laban | Incumbent won reelection. |

=== Ilocos Region ===
| District | Incumbent party | Representative elected | | Notes |
|---|---|---|---|---|
| Ilocos Norte-1st | PDP–Laban | Ria Christina Fariñas | PDP–Laban | New representative; daughter of predecessor. |
| Ilocos Norte-2nd | Nacionalista | Eugenio Barba | Nacionalista | New representative. Won election unopposed. |
| Ilocos Sur-1st | Nacionalista | Deogracias Victor Savellano | Nacionalista | Incumbent won reelection. |
| Ilocos Sur-2nd | Hugpong | Kristine Singson-Meehan | Hugpong | New representative; daughter of predecessor. |
| La Union-1st | NPC | Pablo C. Ortega | NPC | Incumbent won reelection. |
| La Union-2nd | PDP–Laban | Sandra Eriguel, MD | PDP–Laban | Incumbent won reelection. |
| Pangasinan-1st District | Nacionalista | Noli Celeste | Nacionalista | New representative. |
| Pangasinan-2nd District | NUP | Jumel Espino | PDP–Laban | New representative. |
| Pangasinan-3rd District | PDP–Laban | Rosemarie Arenas | PDP–Laban | Incumbent won reelection. |
| Pangasinan-4th District | Lakas | Christopher de Venecia | Lakas | Incumbent won reelection. |
| Pangasinan-5th District | PDP–Laban | Ramon Guico III | Lakas | Defeated incumbent. |
| Pangasinan-6th District | NPC | Tyrone Agabas | NPC | New representative; son of predecessor. |

=== Cagayan Valley ===
| District | Incumbent party | Representative elected | | Notes |
|---|---|---|---|---|
| Batanes | Liberal | Ciriaco Gato Jr. | PDP–Laban | New representative |
| Cagayan-1st | PDP–Laban | Ramon Nolasco Jr. | PDP–Laban | New representative. |
| Cagayan-2nd | NUP | Sam Vargas-Alfonso | NUP | New representative. |
| Cagayan-3rd | NUP | Joseph Lara | PDP–Laban | New representative |
| Isabela-1st | Nacionalista | Antonio T. Albano | Nacionalista | New representative, new district |
| Isabela-2nd | Liberal | Ed Christopher Go | Liberal | New representative, new district |
| Isabela-3rd | NPC | Ian Paul Dy | NPC | New representative, new district |
| Isabela-4th | NPC | Alyssa Sheena Tan | PFP | New representative. |
| Isabela-5th | Nacionalista | Mike Dy III | PFP | New representative. |
| Isabela-6th | NPC | Faustino Dy V | NPC | New representative. |
| Nueva Vizcaya | NUP | Luisa Lloren Cuaresma | NUP | Incumbent won reelection. |
| Quirino | PDP–Laban | Junie Cua | PDP–Laban | New representative. |

=== Cordillera Administrative Region ===
| District | Incumbent party | Representative elected | | Notes |
|---|---|---|---|---|
| Abra | Hugpong | Joseph Bernos | Hugpong | Incumbent won reelection. |
| Apayao | NPC | Elias Bulut Jr. | NPC | Former representative. Won election unopposed |
| Baguio City | Nacionalista | Mark Go | Nacionalista | Incumbent won reelection. |
| Benguet | Liberal | Nestor Fongwan | PDP–Laban | New representative; former governor. |
| Ifugao | Liberal | Solomon Chungalao | NPC | Former representative. |
| Kalinga | Liberal | Allen Jesse Mangaoang | Liberal | Incumbent representative. |
| Mountain Province | Liberal | Maximo Dalog Jr. | Nacionalista | New representative. |

=== Central Luzon ===
| District | Incumbent party | Representative elected | | Notes |
|---|---|---|---|---|
| Aurora | LDP | Rommel Rico Angara | LDP | New representative. |
| Bataan-1st | PDP–Laban | Geraldine Roman | PDP–Laban | Incumbent won reelection. |
| Bataan-2nd | PDP–Laban | Joet Garcia | PDP–Laban | Incumbent won reelection unopposed. |
| Bulacan-1st | NUP | Jose Antonio Sy-Alvarado | NUP | Incumbent won reelection. |
| Bulacan-2nd | NUP | Apolonio Pancho | NUP | Incumbent won reelection. |
| Bulacan-3rd | NUP | Lorna Silverio | NUP | Incumbent won reelection. |
| Bulacan-4th | PDP–Laban | Henry Villarica | PDP–Laban | New representative won election unopposed. |
| Nueva Ecija-1st | PDP–Laban | Estrelita Suansing | PDP–Laban | Incumbent won reelection. |
| Nueva Ecija-2nd | NUP | Mikki Violago | NUP | Incumbent won reelection. |
| Nueva Ecija-3rd | PDP–Laban | Rosanna Vergara | PDP–Laban | Incumbent won reelection. |
| Nueva Ecija-4th | NUP | Maricel Natividad | PRP | New representative. Defeated incumbent |
| Pampanga-1st | PDP–Laban | Carmelo Lazatin II | PDP–Laban | Incumbent won reelection. |
| Pampanga-2nd | PDP–Laban | Mikey Arroyo | Lakas | Former representative; son of predecessor. |
| Pampanga-3rd | PDP–Laban | Aurelio Gonzales Jr. | PDP–Laban | Incumbent won reelection. |
| Pampanga-4th | PDP–Laban | Juan Pablo Bondoc | PDP–Laban | Incumbent won reelection. |
| San Jose del Monte City | PDP–Laban | Florida Robes | PDP–Laban | Incumbent won reelection. |
| Tarlac-1st | NPC | Carlos Cojuangco | NPC | Incumbent won reelection |
| Tarlac-2nd | NPC | Victor Yap | NPC | Incumbent won reelection |
| Tarlac-3rd | NPC | Noel Villanueva | NPC | Incumbent won reelection. |
| Zambales-1st | PDP–Laban | Jeffrey Khonghun | PDP–Laban | Incumbent won reelection. |
| Zambales-2nd | Liberal | Cherry Deloso-Montalla | Liberal | Incumbent won reelection. |

=== Calabarzon ===
| District | Incumbent party | Representative elected | | Notes |
|---|---|---|---|---|
| Antipolo-1st | NUP | Roberto Puno | NUP | Former representative. |
| Antipolo-2nd | NUP | Resurreccion Acop | NUP | New representative won election unopposed. |
| Batangas-1st | Nacionalista | Eileen Ermita-Buhain | Nacionalista | Incumbent won reelection. |
| Batangas-2nd | Nacionalista | Raneo Abu | Nacionalista | Incumbent won reelection |
| Batangas-3rd | PDP–Laban | Maria Theresa Collantes | PDP–Laban | Incumbent won reelection |
| Batangas-4th | Nacionalista | Lianda Bolilia | Nacionalista | Incumbent won reelection |
| Batangas-5th | Nacionalista | Marvey Mariño | Nacionalista | Incumbent won reelection unopposed |
| Batangas-6th | Nacionalista | Vilma Santos-Recto | Nacionalista | Incumbent won reelection |
| Biñan City | PDP–Laban | Marlyn Alonte-Naguiat | PDP–Laban | Incumbent won reelection |
| Calamba City | Liberal | Joaquin Chipeco, Jr. | Liberal | New district, old 2nd district splits into two district comprising the Lone district of Calamba City and the new 2nd District which consists of Cabuyao, Bay and Los Baños. Old 2nd district incumbent Joaquin Chipeco, Jr. ran here unopposed. |
| Cavite-1st | Liberal | Francis Gerald Abaya | Liberal | Incumbent won reelection. |
| Cavite-2nd | NPC | Strike Revilla | NPC | Incumbent won reelection. |
| Cavite-3rd | PDP–Laban | Alex Advincula | PDP–Laban | Incumbent won reelection unopposed. |
| Cavite-4th | NUP | Elpidio Barzaga, Jr. | NUP | Former representative; husband of predecessor. |
| Cavite-5th | NPC | Dahlia Loyola | NPC | Incumbent won reelection. |
| Cavite-6th | NUP | Luis A. Ferrer IV | NUP | New district, old 6th district splits into two district comprising the new 6th and 7th district. Old 6th district incumbent Luis Ferrer IV ran here. |
| Cavite-7th | NUP | Jesus Crispin Remulla | Nacionalista | New district. Former representative. |
| Cavite-8th | PDP–Laban | Abraham Tolentino | PDP–Laban | Incumbent won reelection unopposed. New district |
| Laguna-1st | PDP–Laban | Dan Fernandez | PDP–Laban | Former representative won election unopposed. |
| Laguna-2nd | Liberal | Ruth Mariano-Hernandez | PDP–Laban | New district, old 2nd district splits into two district comprising the Lone district of Calamba City and the new 2nd District which consists of Cabuyao, Bay and Los Baños. Joaquin Chipeco, Jr. (LP) previously held the old 2nd district. New representative won election. |
| Laguna-3rd | Nacionalista | Marisol Aragones-Sampelo | Nacionalista | Incumbent won reelection. |
| Laguna-4th | PDP–Laban | Benjamin Agarao Jr. | PDP–Laban | Incumbent won reelection. |
| Quezon-1st | NPC | Wilfrido Mark Enverga | NPC | Former representative; brother of predecessor. |
| Quezon-2nd | Liberal | David Suarez | Nacionalista | New representative; former governor. |
| Quezon-3rd | Lakas | Aleta Suarez | Lakas | Former representative; wife of predecessor. |
| Quezon-4th | NPC | Angelina Tan | NPC | Incumbent won reelection unopposed. |
| Rizal-1st | NPC | Michael John Duavit | NPC | Incumbent won reelection. |
| Rizal-2nd | NPC | Fidel Nograles | PDP–Laban | New representative |

=== Southwestern Tagalog Region ===
| District | Incumbent party | Representative elected | | Notes |
|---|---|---|---|---|
| Marinduque | PDP–Laban | Lord Allan Jay Velasco | PDP–Laban | Incumbent won reelection. |
| Occidental Mindoro | Liberal | Josephine Y. Ramirez-Sato | Liberal | Incumbent won reelection. |
| Oriental Mindoro-1st | PDP–Laban | Paulino Salvador C. Leachon | PDP–Laban | Incumbent won reelection. |
| Oriental Mindoro-2nd | PFP | Alfonso Umali Jr. | Liberal | Former representative. |
| Palawan-1st | NUP | Franz Josef George E. Alvarez | NUP | Incumbent won reelection. |
| Palawan-2nd | PPP | Cyrille Abueg | PPP | New representative |
| Palawan-3rd | PPP | Gil Acosta Jr. | PPP | Incumbent won reelection |
| Romblon | Nacionalista | Eleandro Jesus Madrona | Nacionalista | Former representative. |

=== Bicol Region ===
| District | Incumbent party | Representative elected | | Notes |
|---|---|---|---|---|
| Albay-1st | Liberal | Edcel Lagman | Liberal | Incumbent won reelection. |
| Albay-2nd | PDP–Laban | Joey Salceda | PDP–Laban | Incumbent won reelection. |
| Albay-3rd | PDP–Laban | Fernando Cabredo | PDP–Laban | New representative |
| Camarines Norte-1st | NUP | Josefina Tallado | PDP–Laban | New representative. Defeated incumbent. |
| Camarines Norte-2nd | PDP–Laban | Marisol Panotes | PDP–Laban | Incumbent won reelection. |
| Camarines Sur-1st | NPC | Marissa Mercado-Andaya | NPC | New representative. |
| Camarines Sur-2nd | Nacionalista | Luis Raymund Villafuerte Jr. | Nacionalista | Incumbent won reelection. |
| Camarines Sur-3rd | Liberal | Gabriel Bordado Jr. | Liberal | Incumbent won reelection. |
| Camarines Sur-4th | NPC | Arnulf Bryan Fuentebella | NPC | New representative. |
| Camarines Sur-5th | Nacionalista | Josal Fortuno | Nacionalista | Incumbent won reelection. |
| Catanduanes | PDP–Laban | Hector Sanchez | Independent | New representative. |
| Masbate-1st | NUP | Narciso Bravo Jr. | NUP | Former representative |
| Masbate-2nd | PDP–Laban | Elisa Olga Kho | PDP–Laban | Incumbent won reelection. |
| Masbate-3rd | NPC | Wilton Kho | PDP–Laban | New representative. |
| Sorsogon-1st | NPC | Evelina Escudero | NPC | Incumbent won reelection unopposed. |
| Sorsogon-2nd | NPC | Ditas Ramos | NPC | New representative |

== Visayas ==
=== Western Visayas ===
| District | Incumbent party | Representative elected | | Notes |
|---|---|---|---|---|
| Aklan-1st | NPC | Carlito Marquez | NPC | New district, old lone district splits into two district comprising the 1st and 2nd district. Old Lone district incumbent Carlito Marquez ran here. |
| Aklan-2nd | NPC | Teodorico Haresco Jr. | Nacionalista | New district, old lone district splits into two district comprising the 1st and 2nd district. Carlito Marquez (Nacionalista) previously held the old lone district. Former representative |
| Antique | PDP–Laban | Loren Legarda | NPC | New representative. |
| Bacolod City | NPC | Greg Gasataya | NPC | Incumbent won reelection. |
| Capiz-1st | Liberal | Emmanuel Billones | Liberal | Incumbent won reelection. |
| Capiz-2nd | NUP | Fredenil Castro | NUP | Incumbent won reelection. |
| Guimaras | PDP–Laban | Ma. Lucille Nava | PDP–Laban | Incumbent won reelection. |
| Iloilo-1st | Nacionalista | Janette Garin | Nacionalista | Former representative. |
| Iloilo-2nd | Nacionalista | Michael Goricetta | Nacionalista | New representative. |
| Iloilo-3rd | PDP–Laban | Lorenz Defensor | PDP–Laban | Incumbent won reelection unopposed. |
| Iloilo-4th | Nacionalista | Braeden Joseph Biron | Nacionalista | New representative; son of predecessor. |
| Iloilo-5th | Nacionalista | Raul Tupas | Nacionalista | Incumbent won reelection. |
| Iloilo City | PDP–Laban | Julienne Baronda | NUP | New representative. |
| Negros Occidental-1st | NPC | Gerardo Valmayor | NPC | New representative. |
| Negros Occidental-2nd | NUP | Leo Rafael Cueva | NUP | Incumbent won reelection. |
| Negros Occidental-3rd | PDP–Laban | Jose Francisco Benitez | PDP–Laban | Incumbent won reelection. |
| Negros Occidental-4th | NUP | Juliet Marie Ferrer | NUP | Incumbent won reelection. |
| Negros Occidental-5th | Lakas | Maria Lourdes Arroyo | Lakas | New representative. |
| Negros Occidental-6th | NPC | Genaro Alvarez | NPC | Former representative. |

=== Central Visayas ===
| District | Incumbent party | Representative elected | | Notes |
|---|---|---|---|---|
| Bohol-1st | NUP | Edgar Chatto | Liberal | Former representative. |
| Bohol-2nd | NPC | Erico Aristotle Aumentado | NPC | Incumbent won reelection. |
| Bohol-3rd | PDP–Laban | Kristine Alexie Besas-Tutor | Nacionalista | New representative |
| Cebu-1st | Independent | Eduardo Gullas | Independent | Former representative. |
| Cebu-2nd | NUP | Wilfredo Caminero | NUP | Incumbent won reelection. |
| Cebu-3rd | PDP–Laban | Pablo John Garcia | PDP–Laban | Former representative. |
| Cebu-4th | PDP–Laban | Janice Salimbangon | PDP–Laban | New representative. |
| Cebu-5th | NPC | Duke Frasco | Lakas | Former Representative. Defeated incumbent. |
| Cebu-6th | PDP–Laban | Emmarie Ouano-Dizon | PDP–Laban | New representative |
| Cebu-7th | NPC | Peter John Calderon | NPC | Incumbent won reelection |
| Cebu City-1st | Liberal | Raul del Mar | Liberal | Incumbent won reelection. |
| Cebu City-2nd | LDP | Rodrigo Abellanosa | LDP | Incumbent won reelection. |
| Lapu-Lapu City | Lakas | Paz Radaza | Lakas | New representative. |
| Negros Oriental-1st | Liberal | Jocelyn Limkaichong | Liberal | Incumbent won reelection |
| Negros Oriental-2nd | NPC | Manuel Sagarbarria | NPC | Incumbent won reelection. |
| Negros Oriental-3rd | PDP–Laban | Arnulfo Teves | PDP–Laban | Incumbent won reelection. |
| Siquijor | NPC | Jec-Jec Villa II | NPC | Defeated incumbent. |

=== Eastern Visayas ===
| District | Incumbent party | Representative elected | | | Notes |
|---|---|---|---|---|---|
| Biliran | PDP–Laban | Gerardo J. Espina, Jr. | | PDP–Laban | Former representative. |
| Eastern Samar | PDP–Laban | Maria Fe Abunda | | PDP–Laban | New Representative. |
| Leyte-1st | Lakas | Ferdinand Martin Romualdez | | Lakas | Former representative. |
| Leyte-2nd | PFP | Lolita Javier | | PFP | New representative. Defeated incumbent. |
| Leyte-3rd | NUP | Vicente S. Veloso III | | NUP | Incumbent won reelection. |
| Leyte-4th | PDP–Laban | Lucy Torres-Gomez | | PDP–Laban | Incumbent won reelection. |
| Leyte-5th | PFP | Carl Nicolas Cari | | PFP | New representative. |
| Northern Samar-1st | Liberal | Paul Daza | | Liberal | Former representative. |
| Northern Samar-2nd | PDP–Laban | Jose Ong, Jr. | | PDP–Laban | New representative. |
| Samar-1st | Liberal | Edgar Mary Sarmiento | | Liberal | Incumbent won reelection. |
| Samar-2nd | PDP–Laban | Sharee Ann Tan | | PDP–Laban | Former representative. |
| Southern Leyte-1st | | | New district, old lone district splits into two district comprising the 1st and 2nd district. | | |
| Southern Leyte-2nd | | | New district, old lone district splits into two district comprising the 1st and 2nd district. | | |

== Mindanao ==
=== Zamboanga Peninsula ===
| District | Incumbent party | Representative elected | | Notes |
|---|---|---|---|---|
| Zamboanga City-1st | NPC | Cesar Jimenez Jr. | NPC | New representative. |
| Zamboanga City-2nd | NPC | Manuel Dalipe | PDP–Laban | Incumbent won reelection. |
| Zamboanga del Norte-1st | Nacionalista | Romeo Jalosjos Jr. | Nacionalista | New representative. |
| Zamboanga del Norte-2nd | PDP–Laban | Glona Labadlabad | PDP–Laban | Incumbent won reelection. |
| Zamboanga del Norte-3rd | Liberal | Isagani Amatong | Liberal | Incumbent won reelection. |
| Zamboanga del Sur-1st | PDP–Laban | Divina Grace Yu | PDP–Laban | Incumbent won reelection. |
| Zamboanga del Sur-2nd | PDP–Laban | Jun Babasa | PDP–Laban | New representative. |
| Zamboanga Sibugay-1st | PDP–Laban | Wilter Palma II | PDP–Laban | Incumbent won reelection. |
| Zamboanga Sibugay-2nd | PDP–Laban | Dulce Ann Hofer | PDP–Laban | Incumbent won reelection. |

=== Northern Mindanao ===
| District | Incumbent party | Representative elected | | Notes |
|---|---|---|---|---|
| Bukidnon-1st | BPP | Malou Acosta-Alba | BPP | Incumbent won reelection. |
| Bukidnon-2nd | PDP–Laban | Jonathan Keith Flores | PDP–Laban | New representative. |
| Bukidnon-3rd | BPP | Manuel Zubiri | BPP | Incumbent won reelection. |
| Bukidnon-4th | Nacionalista | Rogelio Neil Roque | Nacionalista | Incumbent won reelection. |
| Cagayan de Oro-1st | PDP–Laban | Rolando Uy | PDP–Laban | Incumbent won reelection. |
| Cagayan de Oro-2nd | CDP | Rufus Rodriguez | CDP | Former representative. |
| Camiguin | PDP–Laban | Xavier Jesus Romualdo | PDP–Laban | Incumbent won reelection. |
| Iligan City | Nacionalista | Frederick Siao | Nacionalista | Incumbent won reelection. |
| Lanao del Norte-1st | PDP–Laban | Mohamad Khalid Quibranza-Dimaporo | PDP–Laban | Incumbent won reelection. |
| Lanao del Norte-2nd | NPC | Abdullah Dimaporo | NPC | Incumbent won reelection. |
| Misamis Occidental-1st | NUP | Diego Ty | NUP | New representative. |
| Misamis Occidental-2nd | Nacionalista | Henry Oaminal | Nacionalista | Incumbent won reelection. |
| Misamis Oriental-1st | Lakas | Christian Unabia | Lakas | New representative. |
| Misamis Oriental-2nd | NUP | Juliette Uy | NUP | Incumbent won reelection. |

=== Davao Region ===
| District | Incumbent party | Representative elected | | Notes |
|---|---|---|---|---|
| Compostela Valley-1st | Hugpong | Manuel E. Zamora | Hugpong | Former representative. |
| Compostela Valley-2nd | PDP–Laban | Ruwel Peter Gonzaga | PDP–Laban | Incumbent won reelection unopposed. |
| Davao City-1st | Hugpong | Paolo Duterte | Hugpong | New representative. |
| Davao City-2nd | Hugpong | Vincent Garcia | Hugpong | Former representative unopposed. |
| Davao City-3rd | Hugpong | Isidro Ungab | Hugpong | Former representative unopposed. |
| Davao del Norte-1st | PDP–Laban | Pantaleon Alvarez | PDP–Laban | Incumbent won reelection. |
| Davao del Norte-2nd | PDP–Laban | Alan Dujali | PDP–Laban | New representative defeated the incumbent. |
| Davao del Sur | Nacionalista | Mercedes Cagas | Nacionalista | Incumbent won reelection. |
| Davao Occidental | NPC | Lorna Bautista-Bandigan | NPC | Incumbent won reelection unopposed. |
| Davao Oriental-1st | Nacionalista | Corazon Malanyaon | Nacionalista | Incumbent won reelection unopposed. |
| Davao Oriental-2nd | PDP–Laban | Joel Almario | PDP–Laban | Incumbent won reelection unopposed. |

=== Soccsksargen ===
| District | Incumbent party | Representative elected | | Notes |
|---|---|---|---|---|
| Cotabato-1st | PDP–Laban | Joel Sacdalan | PDP–Laban | New representative. |
| Cotabato-2nd | Nacionalista | Rudy Caoagdan | Nacionalista | New representative. |
| Cotabato-3rd | Nacionalista | Jose Tejada | Nacionalista | Incumbent won reelection unopposed. |
| Sarangani | PDP–Laban | Rogelio Pacquiao | PDP–Laban | Incumbent won reelection. |
| South Cotabato-1st | PDP–Laban | Shirlyn Bañas-Nograles | PDP–Laban | New representative. |
| South Cotabato-2nd | PDP–Laban | Ferdinand Hernandez | PDP–Laban | Incumbent won reelection. |
| Sultan Kudarat-1st | NUP | Bai Rihan Sakaluran | NUP | New representative. |
| Sultan Kudarat-2nd | PDP–Laban | Horacio Suansing Jr. | PDP–Laban | Incumbent won reelection. |

=== Caraga ===
| District | Incumbent party | Representative elected | | Notes |
|---|---|---|---|---|
| Agusan del Norte-1st | Nacionalista | Lawrence Lemuel Fortun | Nacionalista | Incumbent won reelection. |
| Agusan del Norte-2nd | PDP–Laban | Angelica Amante-Matba | PDP–Laban | Former representative defeated incumbent. |
| Agusan del Sur-1st | NUP | Alfel Bascug | NUP | New representative |
| Agusan del Sur-2nd | NUP | Eddiebong Plaza | NUP | New representative. |
| Dinagat Islands | PDP–Laban | Alan Uno Ecleo | PDP–Laban | New representative. |
| Surigao del Norte-1st | PDP–Laban | Francisco Jose Matugas II | PDP–Laban | Incumbent won reelection. |
| Surigao del Norte-2nd | Nacionalista | Robert "Ace" Barbers | Nacionalista | Incumbent won reelection. |
| Surigao del Sur-1st | Lakas | Prospero Pichay Jr. | Lakas | Incumbent won reelection. |
| Surigao del Sur-2nd | PDP–Laban | Johnny Pimentel | PDP–Laban | Incumbent won reelection. |

=== Bangsamoro ===
| District | Incumbent party | Representative elected | | Notes |
|---|---|---|---|---|
| Basilan | Liberal | Mujiv Hataman | Liberal | New representative. |
| Lanao del Sur-1st | Nacionalista | Ansaruddin Alonto Adiong | Nacionalista | Incumbent won reelection. |
| Lanao del Sur-2nd | Nacionalista | Farouk Macarambon | Nacionalista | New representative. |
| Maguindanao-1st | PDP–Laban | Datu Roonie Sinsuat Sr. | PDP–Laban | New representative. |
| Maguindanao-2nd | PDP–Laban | Esmael Mangudadatu | PDP–Laban | New representative. |
| Sulu-1st | PDP–Laban | Samier Tan | PDP–Laban | New representative. |
| Sulu-2nd | Nacionalista | Abdulmunir Mundoc Arbison | Nacionalista | Incumbent won reelection. |
| Tawi-Tawi | NUP | Rashidin Matba | NUP | New representative defeated incumbent. |
