= List of representatives elected in the 2016 Philippine House of Representatives election =

These are the representatives elected in the 2016 Philippine House of Representatives elections. Seats highlighted in gray are districts in which boundaries were altered.

== Luzon ==
=== National Capital Region ===
District	Incumbent party	Representative elected		Notes
Caloocan-1st	NPC	Dale Gonzalo Malapitan	Liberal	New representative.
Caloocan-2nd	Liberal	Edgar Erice	Liberal	Incumbent won reelection.
Las Piñas	Nacionalista	Mark Villar	Liberal	Incumbent won reelection.
Makati-1st	UNA	Manuel Monsour T. del Rosario	UNA	New representative.
Makati-2nd	UNA	Luis Campos	UNA	New representative.
Malabon	NPC	Federico Sandoval II	NPC	New representative.
Mandaluyong	Liberal	Alexandra Gonzales	Liberal	New representative.
Manila-1st	Liberal	Manny Lopez	NPC	New representative.
Manila-2nd	Liberal	Carlo Lopez	Liberal	Incumbent won reelection unopposed.
Manila-3rd	Liberal	John Marvin “Yul Servo” Nieto	Asenso Manileño	New representative.
Manila-4th	NUP	Edward Maceda	Asenso Manileño	New representative.
Manila-5th	KABAKA	Amanda Christina Bagatsing	KABAKA	New representative.
Manila-6th	Liberal	Bienvenido M. Abante Jr.	Liberal	Incumbent won reelection.
Marikina-1st	Liberal	Bayani Fernando	NPC	New representative.
Marikina-2nd	Liberal	Miro Quimbo	Liberal	Incumbent won reelection unopposed.
Muntinlupa	Liberal	Rozzano Rufino Biazon	Liberal	Former representative.
Navotas	UNA	Toby Tiangco	UNA	Incumbent won reelection.
Parañaque-1st	Liberal	Eric Olivarez	Liberal	Incumbent won reelection.
Parañaque-2nd	UNA	Gustavo Tambuting	UNA	Incumbent won reelection.
Pasay	Liberal	Imelda Calixto-Rubiano	Liberal	incumbent won reelection.
Pasig	NPC	Ricky Eusebio	Nacionalista	New representative.
Quezon City-1st District	Liberal	Vincent Crisologo	UNA	Former representative. Defeated incumbent.
Quezon City-2nd District	Liberal	Winston Castelo	Liberal	Incumbent won reelection unopposed.
Quezon City-3rd District	Liberal	Jorge John B. Banal Jr.	Liberal	Incumbent won reelection unopposed.
Quezon City-4th District	Liberal	Feliciano Belmonte, Jr.	Liberal	Incumbent won reelection.
Quezon City-5th District	Liberal	Alfredo Paolo Vargas III	Liberal	Incumbent won reelection unopposed.
Quezon City-6th District	Liberal	Jose Christopher Belmonte	Liberal	Incumbent won reelection unopposed.
San Juan	Nacionalista	Ronaldo Zamora	Nacionalista	Incumbent won reelection.
Taguig-Pateros	Liberal	Arnel Cerafica	Liberal	Incumbent won reelection.
Taguig	Nacionalista	Pia Cayetano	Nacionalista	New representative.
Valenzuela-1st District	NPC	Weslie Gatchalian	NPC	New representative.
Valenzuela-2nd District	Liberal	Eric Martinez	PDP–Laban	New representative.

=== Ilocos Region ===
District	Incumbent party	Representative elected		Notes
Ilocos Norte-1st	Nacionalista	Rodolfo Fariñas	Nacionalista	Incumbent won reelection.
Ilocos Norte-2nd	Nacionalista	Imelda Marcos	Nacionalista	Incumbent won reelection.
Ilocos Sur-1st	Nacionalista	Deogracias Victor Savellano	Nacionalista	New representative.
Ilocos Sur-2nd	Liberal	Eric Singson Jr.	Liberal	Incumbent won reelection.
La Union-1st	Lakas	Pablo C. Ortega	Liberal	New representative.
La Union-2nd	PDP–Laban	Sandra Y. Eriguel, MD	PDP–Laban	New representative.
Pangasinan-1st District	NPC	Jesus Celeste	NPC	Incumbent won reelection.
Pangasinan-2nd District	Liberal	Leopoldo Bataoil	Liberal	Incumbent won reelection unopposed.
Pangasinan-3rd District	Liberal	Rosemarie Arenas	Liberal	Incumbent won reelection.
Pangasinan-4th District	NPC	Christopher de Venecia	NPC	New representative.
Pangasinan-5th District	NPC	Amado T. Espino	Aksyon	Defeated incumbent.
Pangasinan-6th District	NPC	Marilyn Primcias-Agabas	NPC	Incumbent won reelection unopposed.

=== Cagayan Valley ===
District	Incumbent party	Representative elected		Notes
Batanes	Liberal	Henerdina Abad	Liberal	Incumbent won reelection.
Cagayan-1st	NPC	Ramon Nolasco	Liberal	New representative.
Cagayan-2nd	NUP	Baby Aline Vargas-Alfonso	NUP	Incumbent won reelection.
Cagayan-3rd	NUP	Randolph Ting	NUP	Incumbent won reelection.
Isabela-1st	Nacionalista	Rodolfo T. Albano III	Nacionalista	Incumbent won reelection.
Isabela-2nd	Liberal	Ana Cristina Go	Liberal	Incumbent won reelection.
Isabela-3rd	NPC	Napoleon Dy	NPC	Incumbent won reelection unopposed.
Isabela-4th	NPC	Nettie Aggabao	NPC	New representative.
Nueva Vizcaya	Nacionalista	Luisa Lloren Cuaresma	UNA	New representative.
Quirino	Liberal	Dakila Carlo Cua	Liberal	Incumbent won reelection unopposed.

=== Cordillera Administrative Region ===
District	Incumbent party	Representative elected		Notes
Abra	Liberal	Joseph Bernos	Liberal	New representative.
Apayao	NPC	Eleanor Bulut-Begtang	NPC	Incumbent won reelection unopposed.
Baguio City	Liberal	Mark Go	Nacionalista	Defeated incumbent.
Benguet	Liberal	Ronald Cosalan	Liberal	Incumbent won reelection.
Ifugao	Liberal	Teddy Baguilat	Liberal	Incumbent won reelection.
Kalinga	Liberal	Allen Jesse Mangaoang	Liberal	New representative.
Mountain Province	Liberal	Maximo Dalog	Liberal	Incumbent won reelection unopposed.

=== Central Luzon ===
District	Incumbent party	Representative elected		Notes
Aurora	LDP	Bellaflor Angara-Castillo	LDP	Incumbent won reelection.
Bataan-1st	Liberal	Geraldine Roman	Liberal	New representative.
Bataan-2nd	NUP	Joet Garcia	NUP	New representative won election unopposed.
Bulacan-1st	Liberal	Jose Antonio Sy-Alvarado	Liberal	New representative.
Bulacan-2nd	NUP	Apolonio Pancho	NUP	Incumbent won reelection.
Bulacan-3rd	Liberal	Lorna Silverio	NUP	Defeated incumbent.
Bulacan-4th	Liberal	Linabelle Ruth R. Villarica	Liberal	Incumbent won reelection.
Nueva Ecija-1st	Liberal	Estrelita Suansing	Liberal	Incumbent won reelection.
Nueva Ecija-2nd	Liberal	Mikki Violago	Liberal	New representative.
Nueva Ecija-3rd	Liberal	Rosanna Vergara	NPC	New representative.
Nueva Ecija-4th	UNA	Magnolia Antonino-Nadres	UNA	New representative.
Pampanga-1st	Liberal	Carmelo Lazatin II	Lingap Lugud	Defeated incumbent.
Pampanga-2nd	Lakas	Gloria Macapagal Arroyo	Lakas	Incumbent won reelection unopposed.
Pampanga-3rd	Liberal	Aurelio Gonzales Jr.	NPC	Returning representative. Defeated incumbent.
Pampanga-4th	Nacionalista	Juan Pablo Bondoc	Nacionalista	Incumbent won reelection.
San Jose del Monte City	Liberal	Florida Robes	Arangkada San Joseño	New representative.
Tarlac-1st	NPC	Carlos Cojuangco	NPC	New representative.
Tarlac-2nd	NPC	Victor Yap	NPC	New representative.
Tarlac-3rd	NPC	Noel Villanueva	NPC	Incumbent won reelection unopposed.
Zambales-1st	Liberal	Jeffrey Khonghun	Liberal	Incumbent won reelection.
Zambales-2nd	Liberal	Cherry Deloso-Montalla	Liberal	Incumbent won reelection.

=== Calabarzon ===
District	Incumbent party	Representative elected		Notes
Antipolo-1st	NUP	Chiqui Roa-Puno	NUP	New representative.
Antipolo-2nd	Liberal	Romeo Acop	Liberal	Incumbent won reelection unopposed.
Batangas-1st	Nacionalista	Eileen Ermita-Buhain	Nacionalista	Incumbent won reelection.
Batangas-2nd	Nacionalista	Raneo Abu	Nacionalista	Incumbent won reelection. New district, old 2nd district splits into two districts comprising the new 2nd and 5th district. Old 2nd district incumbent Raneo Abu ran here.
Batangas-3rd	Liberal	Maria Theresa Collantes	Liberal	New representative won election unopposed.
Batangas-4th	NPC	Lianda Bolilia	Liberal	New representative; new district. Old 4th district splits into two districts comprising the new 4th and 6th district.
Batangas-5th	Nacionalista	Marivic Mariño	Liberal	New representative; new district. Incumbent Raneo Abu (Nacionalista) at the 2nd district.
Batangas-6th	NPC	Vilma Santos-Recto	Liberal	New representative; new district.
Biñan City	Liberal	Marlyn Alonte-Naguiat	Liberal	New district, old 1st district splits into two district comprising the Lone district of Biñan City and the new 1st District which consists of Santa Rosa City and San Pedro City. Danilo Ramon S. Fernandez (LP) previously held the old 1st district. New representative won election unopposed.
Cavite-1st	Liberal	Francis Gerald Abaya	Liberal	Incumbent won reelection.
Cavite-2nd	Lakas	Edwin Revilla	Lakas	New representative.
Cavite-3rd	Liberal	Alex Advincula	Liberal	Incumbent won reelection unopposed.
Cavite-4th	NUP	Jennifer Barzaga	NUP	New representative.
Cavite-5th	Liberal	Roy Loyola	Liberal	Incumbent won reelection.
Cavite-6th	NUP	Luis A. Ferrer IV	NUP	Incumbent won reelection unopposed.
Cavite-7th	NUP	Abraham Tolentino	NUP	Incumbent won reelection unopposed.
Laguna-1st	Liberal	Arlene Arcillas-Nazareno	Liberal	New district, old 1st district splits into two districts comprising the Lone district of Biñan City and the new 1st district which consists of Santa Rosa City and San Pedro City. Danilo Ramon S. Fernandez (LP) previously held the old 1st district. New representative won election unopposed.
Laguna-2nd	Liberal	Joaquin Chipeco, Jr.	Liberal	Incumbent won reelection unopposed.
Laguna-3rd	UNA	Marisol Aragones-Sampelo	UNA	Incumbent won reelection.
Laguna-4th	Liberal	Benjamin Agarao, Jr.	Liberal	Incumbent won reelection.
Quezon-1st	NPC	Trina Enverga	NPC	New representative.
Quezon-2nd	Liberal	Vicente Alcala	Liberal	Incumbent won reelection.
Quezon-3rd	Lakas	Danilo Suarez	UNA	Returning representative won election unopposed.
Quezon-4th	NPC	Angelina Tan	NPC	Incumbent won reelection.
Rizal-1st	NPC	Michael John Duavit	NPC	Former representative.
Rizal-2nd	NPC	Isidro Rodriguez, Jr.	NPC	Incumbent won reelection..

=== Mimaropa ===
District	Incumbent party	Representative elected		Notes
Marinduque	NUP	Lord Allan Jay Velasco	NUP	Incumbent won reelection.
Occidental Mindoro	Liberal	Josephine Y. Ramirez-Sato	Liberal	Incumbent won reelection.
Oriental Mindoro-1st	Liberal	Paulino Salvador C. Leachon	Liberal	Incumbent won reelection.
Oriental Mindoro-2nd	Liberal	Reynaldo V. Umali	Liberal	Incumbent won reelection.
Palawan-1st	NUP	Franz Josef George E. Alvarez	NUP	Incumbent won reelection.
Palawan-2nd	Liberal	Frederick Abueg	Liberal	Incumbent won reelection unopposed.
Palawan-3rd	Liberal	Gil Acosta	NPC	Defeated incumbent.
Romblon	Nacionalista	Emmanuel Madrona	Nacionalista	New representative.

=== Bicol Region ===
District	Incumbent party	Representative elected		Notes
Albay-1st	Liberal	Edcel Lagman	Liberal	Former representative.
Albay-2nd	Liberal	Joey Salceda	Liberal	Former representative.
Albay-3rd	Liberal	Fernando Gonzalez	Liberal	Incumbent won reelection.
Camarines Norte-1st	NUP	Renato Unico, Jr.	Liberal	New representative.
Camarines Norte-2nd	Liberal	Marisol Panotes	Liberal	New representative.
Camarines Sur-1st	NPC	Rolando Andaya, Jr.	NPC	Incumbent won reelection.
Camarines Sur-2nd	Lakas	Luis Raymund Villafuerte Jr.	Nacionalista	New representative.
Camarines Sur-3rd	Liberal	Gabriel Bordado Jr.	Liberal	New representative.
Camarines Sur-4th	NPC	Arnulfo Fuentebella	Nacionalista	Former representative.
Camarines Sur-5th	Liberal	Salvio Fortuno	Liberal	Incumbent won reelection.
Catanduanes	Liberal	Cesar Sarmiento	Liberal	Incumbent won reelection.
Masbate-1st	NUP	Ma. Vida Espinosa-Bravo	NUP	Incumbent won reelection.
Masbate-2nd	Nacionalista	Elisa Olga Kho	Nacionalista	Incumbent won reelection.
Masbate-3rd	NPC	Scott Davies Lanete	NPC	Incumbent won reelection.
Sorsogon-1st	NPC	Evelina Escudero	NPC	Incumbent won reelection unopposed.
Sorsogon-2nd	Liberal	Deogracias Ramos Jr.	Liberal	Incumbent won reelection.

== Visayas ==
=== Western Visayas ===
District	Incumbent party	Representative elected		Notes
Aklan	Nacionalista	Carlito Marquez	NPC	Defeated incumbent.
Antique	Liberal	Paolo Everardo Javier	Liberal	Incumbent won reelection.
Capiz-1st	Liberal	Emmanuel Billones	Liberal	New representative.
Capiz-2nd	NUP	Fredenil Castro	NUP	Incumbent won reelection unopposed.
Guimaras	Liberal	Ma. Lucille Nava	Liberal	New representative.
Iloilo-1st	Liberal	Oscar Garin Jr.	Liberal	Incumbent won reelection.
Iloilo-2nd	Liberal	Arcadio Gorriceta	Liberal	Incumbent won reelection.
Iloilo-3rd	Liberal	Arthur Defensor Jr.	Liberal	Incumbent won reelection unopposed.
Iloilo-4th	UNA	Ferjenel Biron	NUP	Former representative
Iloilo-5th	Liberal	Raul Tupas	NPC	New representative.
Iloilo City	Liberal	Jerry Treñas	Liberal	Incumbent won reelection.

=== Negros Island Region ===
District	Incumbent party	Representative elected		Notes
Bacolod City	NPC	Greg Gasataya	NPC	New representative.
Negros Occidental-1st	NPC	Santiago Yap	NPC	New representative.
Negros Occidental-2nd	NUP	Leo Rafael Cueva	NUP	Incumbent won reelection unopposed.
Negros Occidental-3rd	Independent	Alfredo Abelardo Benitez	Independent	Incumbent won reelection.
Negros Occidental-4th	United Negros Alliance	Juliet Marie Ferrer	NUP	New representative.
Negros Occidental-5th	Liberal	Alejandro Mirasol	Liberal	Incumbent won reelection.
Negros Occidental-6th	NPC	Mercedes Alvarez	NPC	Incumbent won reelection unopposed.
Negros Oriental-1st	Liberal	Jocelyn Sy-Limkaichong	Liberal	Returning representative.
Negros Oriental-2nd	NPC	Manuel Sagarbarria	NPC	New representative.
Negros Oriental-3rd	NPC	Arnulfo Teves Jr.	NPC	New representative.

=== Central Visayas ===
District	Incumbent party	Representative elected		Notes
Bohol-1st	Liberal	Rene Relampagos	Liberal	Incumbent won reelection.
Bohol-2nd	NPC	Erico Aristotle Aumentado	NPC	Incumbent won reelection.
Bohol-3rd	NPC	Arthur Yap	NPC	Incumbent won reelection.
Cebu-1st	Nacionalista	Gerald Anthony Gullas, Jr.	Nacionalista	Incumbent won reelection.
Cebu-2nd	Liberal	Wilfredo Caminero	Liberal	Incumbent won reelection. Old second district split into two districts that will comprise the new second and seventh districts. Incumbent Wilfredo Caminero (LP) ran here.
Cebu-3rd	1CEBU	Gwendolyn Garcia	1CEBU	Incumbent won reelection.
Cebu-4th	1CEBU	Benhur Salimbangon	1CEBU	Incumbent won reelection.
Cebu-5th	NPC	Ramon Durano VI	NPC	Former Representative.
Cebu-6th	Liberal	Jonas Cortes	Liberal	Incumbent won reelection.
Cebu-7th	Liberal	Peter John Calderon	Liberal	New district and representative. Incumbent Wilfredo Caminero (LP) at the new second district.
Cebu City-1st	Liberal	Raul del Mar	Liberal	Incumbent won reelection.
Cebu City-2nd	Liberal	Rodrigo Abellanosa	Liberal	Incumbent won reelection.
Lapu-Lapu City	Liberal	Aileen Radaza	Liberal	Incumbent won reelection.
Siquijor	Liberal	Ramon Vicente Rocamora	Independent	Defeated incumbent.

=== Eastern Visayas ===
District	Incumbent party	Representative elected		Notes
Biliran	Liberal	Rogelio Espina	Liberal	Incumbent won reelection unopposed.
Eastern Samar	Liberal	Ben Evardone	Liberal	Incumbent won reelection.
Leyte-1st	Lakas	Yedda Romualdez	Lakas	New representative.
Leyte-2nd	Liberal	Henry Ong	NPC	Defeated incumbent.
Leyte-3rd	Liberal	Ching Veloso	NUP	New representative.
Leyte-4th	Liberal	Lucy Marie Torres-Gomez	Liberal	Incumbent won reelection.
Leyte-5th	Liberal	Jose Carlos Cari	Liberal	Incumbent won reelection.
Northern Samar-1st	Nacionalista	Raul Daza	Liberal	Defeated incumbent.
Northern Samar-2nd	NUP	Edwin Ongchuan	NUP	New representative won election unopposed.
Samar-1st	Liberal	Edgar Sarmiento	Liberal	New representative.
Samar-2nd	NPC	Milagrosa Tan	NPC	Incumbent won reelection.
Southern Leyte	NUP	Roger Mercado	Liberal	Former representative.

== Mindanao ==
=== Zamboanga Peninsula ===
District	Incumbent party	Representative elected		Notes
Zamboanga City-1st	LDP	Celso Lobregat	LDP	Incumbent won reelection.
Zamboanga City-2nd	Nacionalista	Manuel Dalipe	NPC	Defeated incumbent.
Zamboanga del Norte-1st	Nacionalista	Seth Frederick P. Jalosjos	Nacionalista	Incumbent won reelection.
Zamboanga del Norte-2nd	Liberal	Glona Labadlabad	Liberal	New representative.
Zamboanga del Norte-3rd	Liberal	Isagani Amatong	Liberal	Incumbent won reelection.
Zamboanga del Sur-1st	NPC	Divina Grace Yu	NPC	New representative.
Zamboanga del Sur-2nd	NPC	Aurora Enerio-Cerilles	NPC	Incumbent won reelection.
Zamboanga Sibugay-1st	Nacionalista	Wilter Palma II	Liberal	Defeated incumbent.
Zamboanga Sibugay-2nd	Liberal	Dulce Ann Hofer	Liberal	Incumbent won reelection.

=== Northern Mindanao ===
District	Incumbent party	Representative elected		Notes
Bukidnon-1st	Liberal	Malou Acosta-Alba	Liberal	Incumbent won reelection.
Bukidnon-2nd	Nacionalista	Florencio T. Flores Jr.	Nacionalista	Incumbent won reelection unopposed.
Bukidnon-3rd	BPP	Manuel Zubiri	Liberal	New representative.
Bukidnon-4th	NPC	Rogelio Neil Roque	NPC	Incumbent won reelection.
Cagayan de Oro City-1st	Liberal	Rolando Uy	Liberal	Incumbent won reelection.
Cagayan de Oro City-2nd	CDP	Maxie Rodriguez	CDP	New representative.
Camiguin	Liberal	Xavier Jesus Romualdo	Liberal	Incumbent won reelection.
Iligan City	Liberal	Frederick Siao	UNA	New representative.
Lanao del Norte-1st	NPC	Khalid Q. Dimaporo	Liberal	New representative.
Lanao del Norte-2nd	NPC	Abdullah Dimaporo	NPC	Incumbent won reelection.
Misamis Occidental-1st	Liberal	Jorge Almonte	Liberal	Incumbent won reelection.
Misamis Occidental-2nd	Nacionalista	Henry S. Oaminal	Nacionalista	Incumbent won reelection unopposed.
Misamis Oriental-1st	Liberal	Peter Unabia	Liberal	Incumbent won reelection.
Misamis Oriental-2nd	NUP	Juliette Uy	NUP	Incumbent won reelection.

=== Davao Region ===
District	Incumbent party	Representative elected		Notes
Compostela Valley-1st	Liberal	Maria Carmen S. Zamora	Liberal	Incumbent won reelection.
Compostela Valley-2nd	Liberal	Ruwel Peter Gonzaga	Liberal	New representative.
Davao City-1st	NUP	Karlo Alexei Nograles	NUP	Incumbent won reelection unopposed.
Davao City-2nd	Liberal	Mylene Garcia-Albano	Liberal	Incumbent won reelection.
Davao City-3rd	Liberal	Alberto Ungab	Nacionalista	New representative.
Davao del Norte-1st	Liberal	Pantaleon Alvarez	PDP–Laban	New representative.
Davao del Norte-2nd	NUP	Antonio Floirendo, Jr.	Kusog Baryohanon	Former representative won election unopposed.
Davao del Sur	Nacionalista	Mercedes Cagas	Nacionalista	Incumbent won reelection. New District, municipalities of Sulop, Kiblawan, Malalag from 2nd district were added to form the new 1st district.
Davao Occidental	Liberal	Lorna Bautista-Bandigan	Liberal	New representative won election unopposed. New district, 5 municipalities are carved out from the old 2nd district forming the new lone district of Davao Occidental.
Davao Oriental-1st	Nacionalista	Corazon Malanyaon	Nacionalista	New representative.
Davao Oriental-2nd	Lakas	Jose Almario	Liberal	New representative.

=== Soccsksargen ===
District	Incumbent party	Representative elected		Notes
Cotabato-1st	Liberal	Jesus Sacdalan	Liberal	Incumbent won reelection.
Cotabato-2nd	Liberal	Nancy Catamco	Liberal	Incumbent won reelection.
Cotabato-3rd	Liberal	Jose Tejada	Liberal	Incumbent won reelection.
Sarangani	UNA	Rogelio Pacquiao	PCM	New representative.
South Cotabato-1st	NPC	Pedro Acharon	NPC	Incumbent won reelection.
South Cotabato-2nd	NPC	Ferdinand L. Hernandez	NPC	Incumbent won reelection.
Sultan Kudarat-1st	Independent	Suharto Mangudadatu	PTM	New representative.
Sultan Kudarat-2nd	NUP	Horacio Suansing Jr.	Liberal	New representative.

=== Caraga Region ===
District	Incumbent party	Representative elected		Notes
Agusan del Norte-1st	Liberal	Lawrence Lemuel H. Fortun	Liberal	Incumbent won reelection.
Agusan del Norte-2nd	Nacionalista	Erlpe John Amante	Nacionalista	Incumbent won reelection.
Agusan del Sur-1st	NUP	Ma. Valentina Plaza-Cornelio	NUP	Incumbent won reelection unopposed.
Agusan del Sur-2nd	NUP	Evelyn Plaza-Mellana	NUP	Incumbent won reelection unopposed.
Dinagat Islands	Liberal	Arlene J. Bag-ao	Liberal	Incumbent won reelection.
Surigao del Norte-1st	Liberal	Francisco Jose Matugas II	Liberal	New representative.
Surigao del Norte-2nd	Liberal	Robert Ace Barbers	Nacionalista	Former representative.
Surigao del Sur-1st	Liberal	Prospero Pichay, Jr.	Lakas	Former representative.
Surigao del Sur-2nd	Liberal	Johnny Pimentel	Liberal	New representative.

=== Autonomous Region in Muslim Mindanao ===
District	Incumbent party	Representative elected		Notes
Basilan	Liberal	Jum Jainudin Akbar	Liberal	New representative.
Lanao del Sur-1st	Liberal	Ansaruddin Alonto Adiong	Liberal	Incumbent won reelection.
Lanao del Sur-2nd	Liberal	Mauyag Balt Papandayan Jr.	PDP–Laban	New representative.
Maguindanao-1st	Liberal	Bai Sandra A. Sema	Liberal	Incumbent won reelection.
Maguindanao-2nd	Liberal	Zajid Mangudadatu	Liberal	Incumbent won reelection.
Sulu-1st	NUP	Tupay Loong	NUP	Incumbent won reelection.
Sulu-2nd	Liberal	Maryam Arbison	Liberal	Incumbent won reelection.
Tawi-Tawi	Liberal	Ruby Sahali	Liberal	Incumbent won reelection.
