= Retiring and term-limited incumbents in the 2010 Philippine House of Representatives elections =

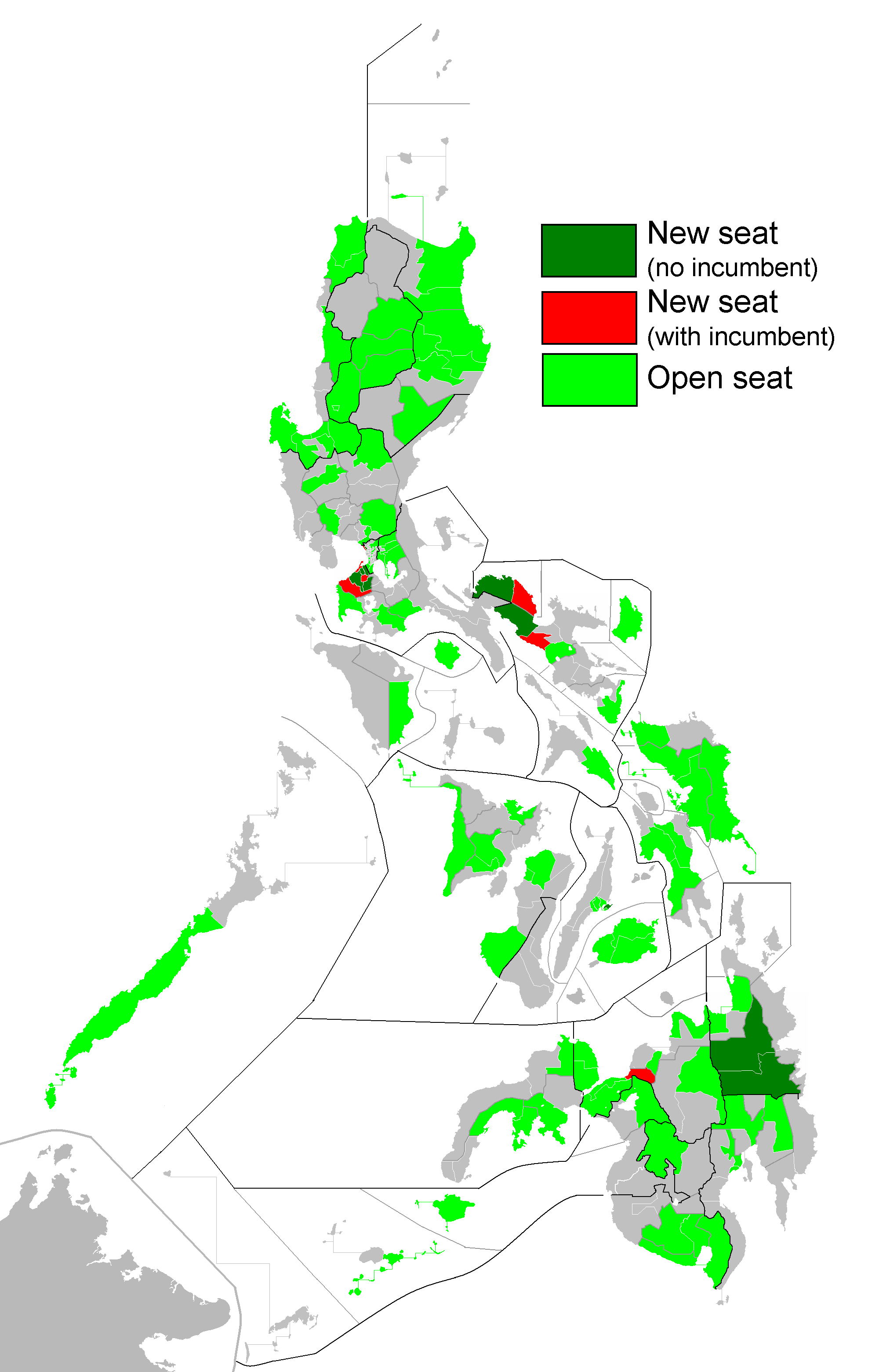
Open and new seats in the 2010 district elections; includes vacated seats where the congressman died while in office.

There are a total of 77 retiring and term-limited congressmen after the 14th Congress. Congressmen who had served three consecutive terms are prohibited from running in the elections; they may run again in 2013 for the 16th Congress.

== Retiring and term-limited incumbents ==
=== Lakas-Kampi-CMD incumbents (45) ===
1. Agusan del Norte's 2nd legislative district: Edelmiro Amante: Retiring to make way for his daughter to run.
2. Antipolo's 2nd legislative district: Angelito Gatlabayan: Ran and lost in the Mayoralty race in Antipolo as the NPC candidate to incumbent Danilo Leyble (Lakas-Kampi-CMD).
3. Antique's legislative district: Exequiel Javier: Term-limited in 2010, ran and won as Governor of Antique.
4. Bacolod's legislative district: Monico Puentevella: Term-limited in 2010, ran and lost in the Mayoralty race in Bacolod to incumbent Evelio Leonardia (NPC) .
5. Baguio's legislative district: Mauricio Domogan: Term-limited in 2010, ran and won as Mayor of Baguio.
6. Batangas's 1st legislative district: Eileen Ermita-Buhain: Term-limited in 2010.
7. Batangas's 3rd legislative district: Victoria Hernandez-Reyes: Term-limited in 2010, ran and lost in the Mayoralty race in Tanauan to incumbent Sonia Torres-Aquino (Liberal).
8. Benguet's legislative district: Samuel Dangwa: Term-limited in 2010, ran and lost in the Gubernatorial race in Benguet as an independent candidate to incumbent Nestor Fongwan (Lakas-Kampi-CMD).
9. Bohol's 1st legislative district: Edgar Chatto: Term-limited in 2010, ran and won as Governor of Bohol.
10. Bohol's 2nd legislative district: Roberto Cajes: Term-limited in 2010, ran and won as Mayor of Trinidad, Bohol.
11. Bohol's 3rd legislative district: Adam Relson Jala: Not running.
12. Bulacan's 3rd legislative district: Lorna Silverio: Term-limited in 2010, ran and won as Mayor of San Rafael, Bulacan.
13. Bulacan's 4th legislative district: Reylina Nicolas: Term-limited in 2010.
14. Camarines Sur's 4th legislative district: Felix Alfelor, Jr.: Term-limited in 2010, ran and lost in the Gubernatorial race in Camarines Sur to incumbent Luis Raymond Villafuerte (Nacionalista).
15. Capiz's 2nd legislative district: Fredenil Castro: Term-limited in 2010.
16. Cebu City's 1st legislative district: Raul del Mar: Term-limited in 2010.
17. Cebu City's 2nd legislative district: Antonio Cuenco: Term-limited in 2010, appointed as Secretary-General of the ASEAN Inter-Parliamentary Assembly (AIPA) on February 4, 2010.
18. Compostela Valley's 1st legislative district: Manuel Zamora: Term-limited in 2010.
19. Cotabato's 1st legislative district: Emmylou Taliño-Mendoza: Term-limited in 2010, ran and won as Governor of Cotabato.
20. Davao City's 1st legislative district: Prospero Nograles: Term-limited in 2010, ran and lost in the Mayoralty race in Davao City to Vice Mayor Sara Zimmerman Duterte (Hugpong sa Tawong Lungsod-PDP–Laban-Liberal).
21. Davao del Norte's 1st legislative district: Arrel Olaño: Run and Lost in Mayoralty race in Tagum City To Incumbent Rey Uy (Liberal Party (Philippines)).
22. Dinagat Islands's legislative district: Glenda Ecleo: Term-limited in 2010.
23. Ifugao's legislative district: Solomon Chungalao: Term-limited in 2010, ran and lost in the Gubernatorial race in Ifugao to Eugene Balitang (Liberal).
24. Ilocos Norte's 1st legislative district: Roque Ablan, Jr.: Term-limited in 2010.
25. Ilocos Sur's 2nd legislative district: Eric Singson: Term-limited in 2010.
26. Iloilo's 3rd legislative district: Arthur Defensor, Sr.: Term-limited in 2010, ran and won as Governor of Iloilo.
27. Lanao del Norte's 1st legislative district: Abdullah D. Dimaporo: Term-limited in 2010, retiring from politics.
28. Lanao del Sur's 1st legislative district: Faysah R.P.M. Dumarpa: Term-limited in 2010.
29. Leyte's 2nd legislative district: Trinidad Apostol: Term-limited in 2010, ran and won as Mayor of Carigara, Leyte.
30. Leyte's 4th legislative district: Eufrocino Codilla, Sr.: Term-limited in 2010.
31. Leyte's 5th legislative district: Carmen L. Cari: Term-limited in 2010, ran and won as Mayor of Baybay unopposed.
32. Manila's 2nd legislative district: Jaime C. Lopez: Term-limited in 2010.
33. Misamis Occidental's 2nd legislative district: Herminia D. Ramiro: Term-limited in 2010, ran and won as Governor of Misamis Occidental.
34. Negros Occidental's legislative district: Jose Carlos Lacson: Term-limited in 2010, ran and lost in the Mayoralty race in Talisay to Eric Saratan (Liberal Party).
35. Quirino's legislative district: Junie Cua: Term-limited in 2010, ran and won as Governor of Quirino.
36. Pampanga's 3rd legislative district: Mikey Arroyo: Not running to make way for his mother Gloria Macapagal Arroyo to run, running as the first party nominee of the party-list group Ang Galing Pinoy.
37. Samar's 1st legislative district: Reynaldo S. Uy: Term-limited in 2010, ran and won as Mayor of Calbayog.
38. Samar's 2nd legislative district: Sharee Ann T. Tan: Ran and won as Governor of Samar.
39. Sarangani's legislative district: Erwin Chiongbian: Term-limited in 2010.
40. Sorsogon's 2nd legislative district: Jose G. Solis: Term-limited in 2010, ran and lost in the Gubernatorial race in Sorsogon as Kampi's candidate to Raul Lee (Lakas-Kampi-CMD).
41. South Cotabato's 2nd legislative district: Arthur Pingoy, Jr.: Term-limited in 2010, ran and won as Governor of South Cotabato.
42. Tarlac's 1st legislative district: Monica Prieto-Teodoro: To help her husband Gilberto Teodoro campaign for President.
43. Zamboanga del Norte's 1st legislative district: Cecilia Jalosjos-Carreon: Term-limited in 2010.
44. Zamboanga Sibugay's 1st legislative district: Belma Cabilao: Term-limited in 2010.
45. Zamboanga Sibugay's 2nd legislative district: Dulce Ann Hofer: Ran and lost in the Gubernatorial race in Zamboanga Sibugay to Rommel Jalosjos (Nacionalista).

=== Liberal Party incumbents (11) ===
1. Bukidnon's 2nd legislative district: Teofisto Guingona III: Ran and won in the Senatorial race (12th place, first 12 are elected).
2. Cagayan's 3rd legislative district: Manuel Mamba: Term-limited in 2010, ran and lost in the Gubernatorial race in Cagayan to incumbent Alvaro Antonio (Lakas-Kampi-CMD).
3. Isabela's 2nd legislative district: Edwin Uy: Term-limited in 2010, ran and lost in the Vice Gubernatorial race Isabela to Rep. Rodolfo Albano III (Lakas-Kampi-CMD).
4. Marinduque's legislative district: Carmencita Reyes: ran and won as Governor of Marinduque, also as Bigkis Pinoy's candidate.
5. Marikina's 2nd legislative district: Del R. De Guzman: Term-limited in 2010, ran and won as Mayor of Marikina.
6. Muntinlupa's legislative district: Ruffy Biazon: Term-limited in 2010, ran and lost in the Senatorial race (14th place, first 12 are elected)
7. Oriental Mindoro's 2nd legislative district: Alfonso Umali, Jr.: Term-limited in 2010, ran and won as Governor of Oriental Mindoro.
8. Quezon's 2nd legislative district: Proceso Alcala: Not running, appointed as Agriculture secretary.
9. Quezon City's 4th legislative district: Nanette Castelo-Daza: Term-limited in 2010.
10. Palawan's 2nd legislative district: Abraham Kahlil Mitra: Term-limited in 2010, ran and won as Governor of Palawan.
11. Pangasinan's 2nd legislative district: Victor Agbayani: Ran and lost in the Gubernatorial race in Pangasinan to incumbent Amado Espino, Jr. (Lakas-Kampi-CMD).

=== Nacionalista incumbents (7) ===
1. Cagayan de Oro's 1st congressional district: Rolando Uy: Ran and lost for Mayor of Cagayan de Oro to Vicente Emano (PMP) as Lakas Kampi's candidate .
2. Cebu's 6th legislative district: Nerissa Corazon Soon-Ruiz: Term-limited in 2010, ran and lost for mayor of Mandaue City to Jonas Cortes (independent)
3. Ilocos Norte's 2nd legislative district: Bongbong Marcos: Ran and won for the Senate (6th, first 12 are elected).
4. Las Piñas's legislative district: Cynthia Villar: Term-limited in 2010.
5. Parañaque City's 1st legislative district: Eduardo Zialcita: Term-limited in 2010, ran and lost for Mayor of Parañaque to Florencio Bernabe (Lakas Kampi)
6. Taguig-Pateros's 1st legislative district: Laarni Cayetano: Ran and won for mayor of Taguig.
7. San Juan City's legislative district: Ronaldo Zamora: Term-limited in 2010.

=== Nationalist People's Coalition incumbents (12) ===
1. Agusan del Sur's legislative district: Rodolfo Plaza: Term-limited in 2010, to ran and lost in the Senatorial race.
2. Cagayan's 1st legislative district: Sally Ponce Enrile: Retiring to make way for her husband to run.
3. Catanduanes's legislative district: Joseph Santiago: Term-limited in 2010, ran and lost in the Gubernatorial race in Catanduanes to incumbent Joseph Cua (Nacionalista).
4. Davao City's 2nd legislative district: Vincent Garcia: Term-limited in 2010.
5. Isabela's 3rd legislative district: Faustino Dy III: Term-limited in 2010, ran and won in the Gubernatorial race in Isabela as Lakas-Kampi-CMD's official candidate.
6. Masbate's 3rd legislative district: Rizalina Seachon-Lanete: ran and won in the Gubernatorial race in Masbate.
7. Pangasinan's 5th legislative district: Marcos Cojuangco: Term-limited in 2010.
8. Pangasinan's 6th legislative district: Conrado M. Estrella III: Term-limited in 2010.
9. Quezon City's 2nd legislative district: Mary Ann Susano: Ran and lost in the Mayoralty race in Quezon City to Vice Mayor Herbert Bautista (Liberal).
10. Rizal's 1st legislative district: Michael John Duavit: Term-limited in 2010.
11. South Cotabato's 1st legislative district: Darlene Antonino-Custodio: Term-limited in 2010, ran and won in the Mayoral race in General Santos.
12. Sulu's 2nd legislative district: Munir Arbison: Term-limited in 2010, ran and lost in the Gubernatorial race in Sulu to incumbent Abdusakur Tan (Lakas-Kampi-CMD).

=== Partido Demokratiko Pilipino-Lakas ng Bayan incumbent (1) ===
1. Makati City's 1st legislative district: Teodoro Locsin, Jr.: Term-limited in 2010.

=== Independent incumbents (2) ===
1. Nueva Ecija's 1st legislative district: Eduardo Nonato N. Joson: "To help bring their local party to victory in 2010".
2. Pangasinan's 4th legislative district: Jose de Venecia, Jr.: Term-limited in 2010.

=== Party-list incumbents (10) ===
1. Akbayan: Risa Hontiveros-Baraquel: Second-termer, ran as the Liberal candidate and lost in the Senatorial race (13th place, first 12 are elected).
2. Anak Mindanao: Mujiv Hataman: Term-limited in 2010, ran as the Liberal candidate and lost in the Gubernatorial race in Basilan to incumbent Jum J. Akbar (Lakas-Kampi-CMD).
3. Association of Philippine Electric Cooperatives: Ernesto C. Pablo: Term-limited in 2010.
4. Association of Philippine Electric Cooperatives: Edgar L. Valdez: Term-limited in 2010.
5. Bayan Muna: Satur Ocampo: Term-limited in 2010, ran and lost in the Senatorial race.
6. Buhay Hayaan Yumabong: Rene Velarde: Term-limited in 2010.
7. Citizen's Battle Against Corruption: Joel Villanueva: Term-limited in 2010.
8. GABRIELA: Liza Maza: Term-limited in 2010, ran as an independent candidate and lost in the Senatorial race.
9. Kasangga sa Kaunlaran: Ma. Lourdes Arroyo: Retiring from politics.
10. The True Marcos Loyalist (For God, Country and People) Association of the Philippines (BANTAY): Jovito Palparan: First-termer, ran as an independent candidate and lost in the Senatorial race.
