= Philippine House Committee on Higher and Technical Education =

Standing committee of the House of Representatives of the Philippines

Committee on Higher and Technical Education
- 20th Congress

History
- New session started: To convene on July 28, 2025

Leadership
- Chairman: Vacant
- Minority Leader: Vacant

Website
- Committee on Higher and Technical Education

The Philippine House Committee on Higher and Technical Education, or House Higher and Technical Education Committee is a standing committee of the Philippine House of Representatives.

== Jurisdiction ==
As prescribed by House Rules, the committee's jurisdiction includes the following:

- Centers of excellence
- Distance education
- Post-secondary and tertiary education
- Students' and teachers' welfare
- Technical education

== Members, 20th Congress ==
As of June 30, 2025, all committee membership positions are vacant until the House convenes for its first regular session on July 28.

== Historical membership rosters ==
=== 18th Congress ===
Position	Members	Party	Province/City	District
Chairperson	Mark Go	Nacionalista	Baguio	Lone
Vice Chairpersons	Strike Revilla	NUP	Cavite	2nd
Vice Chairpersons	Corazon Nuñez-Malanyaon	Nacionalista	Davao Oriental	1st
Vice Chairpersons	Juan Fidel Felipe Nograles	Lakas	Rizal	2nd
Vice Chairpersons	Alan Dujali	PDP–Laban	Davao del Norte	2nd
Vice Chairpersons	Cesar Jimenez Jr.	PDP–Laban	Zamboanga City	1st
Vice Chairpersons	Leonardo Babasa Jr.	PDP–Laban	Zamboanga del Sur	2nd
Vice Chairpersons	Dulce Ann Hofer	PDP–Laban	Zamboanga Sibugay	2nd
Vice Chairpersons	Macnell Lusotan	MARINO	Party-list	
Vice Chairpersons	Ansaruddin Abdul Malik Adiong	Nacionalista	Lanao del Sur	1st
Members for the Majority	Kristine Alexie Besas-Tutor	Nacionalista	Bohol	3rd
Members for the Majority	Lolita Javier	PFP	Leyte	2nd
Members for the Majority	Michael Gorriceta	Nacionalista	Iloilo	2nd
Members for the Majority	Maximo Dalog Jr.	Nacionalista	Mountain Province	Lone
Members for the Majority	Eugenio Angelo Barba	Nacionalista	Ilocos Norte	2nd
Members for the Majority	Eduardo Gullas	Nacionalista	Cebu	1st
Members for the Majority	Raul Tupas	Nacionalista	Iloilo	5th
Members for the Majority	Frederick Siao	Nacionalista	Iligan	Lone
Members for the Majority	Mario Vittorio Mariño	Nacionalista	Batangas	5th
Members for the Majority	Braeden John Biron	Nacionalista	Iloilo	4th
Members for the Majority	Narciso Bravo Jr.	NUP	Masbate	1st
Members for the Majority	Leo Rafael Cueva	NUP	Negros Occidental	2nd
Members for the Majority	Luisa Lloren Cuaresma	NUP	Nueva Vizcaya	Lone
Members for the Majority	Faustino Michael Dy V	NUP	Isabela	6th
Members for the Majority	Diego Ty	NUP	Misamis Occidental	1st
Members for the Majority	Jose Antonio Sy-Alvarado	NUP	Bulacan	1st
Members for the Majority	Jose Ong Jr.	NUP	Northern Samar	2nd
Members for the Majority	Vincent Franco Frasco	Lakas	Cebu	5th
Members for the Majority	Joy Myra Tambunting	NUP	Parañaque	2nd
Members for the Majority	Ma. Lucille Nava	PDP–Laban	Guimaras	Lone
Members for the Majority	Divina Grace Yu	PDP–Laban	Zamboanga del Sur	1st
Members for the Majority	Ma. Fe Abunda	PDP–Laban	Eastern Samar	Lone
Members for the Majority	Jose Enrique Garcia III	NUP	Bataan	2nd
Members for the Majority	Ruwel Peter Gonzaga	PDP–Laban	Davao de Oro	2nd
Members for the Majority	Joseph Lara	PDP–Laban	Cagayan	3rd
Members for the Majority	Glona Labadlabad	PDP–Laban	Zamboanga del Norte	2nd
Members for the Majority	Rogelio Pacquiao	PDP–Laban	Sarangani	Lone
Members for the Majority	Jesus Manuel Suntay	PDP–Laban	Quezon City	4th
Members for the Majority	Ma. Theresa Collantes	PDP–Laban	Batangas	3rd
Members for the Majority	Marisol Panotes	PDP–Laban	Camarines Norte	2nd
Members for the Majority	Michael John Duavit	NPC	Rizal	1st
Members for the Majority	Allan Benedict Reyes	PFP	Quezon City	3rd
Members for the Majority	Dahlia Loyola	NPC	Cavite	5th
Members for the Majority	Genaro Alvarez Jr.	NPC	Negros Occidental	6th
Members for the Majority	Angelina Tan	NPC	Quezon	4th
Members for the Majority	Wilfrido Mark Enverga	NPC	Quezon	1st
Members for the Majority	Gerardo Valmayor Jr.	NPC	Negros Occidental	1st
Members for the Majority	Josephine Ramirez-Sato	Liberal	Occidental Mindoro	Lone
Members for the Majority	Paul Daza	Liberal	Northern Samar	1st
Members for the Majority	Eric Yap	ACT-CIS	Party-list	
Members for the Majority	Ramon Nolasco Jr.	NUP	Cagayan	1st
Members for the Majority	Jocelyn Fortuno	Nacionalista	Camarines Sur	5th
Members for the Majority	Mercedes Cagas	Nacionalista	Davao del Sur	Lone
Members for the Majority	Ruth Mariano-Hernandez	Independent	Laguna	2nd
Members for the Majority	Victor Yap	NPC	Tarlac	2nd
Members for the Majority	Estrellita Suansing	PDP–Laban	Nueva Ecija	1st
Members for the Majority	Amihilda Sangcopan	AMIN	Party-list	
Members for the Majority	Maricel Natividad-Nagaño	PRP	Nueva Ecija	4th
Members for the Majority	Shirlyn Bañas-Nograles	PDP–Laban	South Cotabato	1st
Members for the Majority	Yasser Balindong	Lakas	Lanao del Sur	2nd
Members for the Minority	Gabriel Bordado Jr.	Liberal	Camarines Sur	3rd
Members for the Minority	Irene Gay Saulog	KALINGA	Party-list	
Members for the Minority	Sarah Jane Elago	Kabataan	Party-list	
Members for the Minority	Angelica Natasha Co	BHW	Party-list	
Members for the Minority	Stella Luz Quimbo	Liberal	Marikina	2nd

== See also ==
- House of Representatives of the Philippines
- List of Philippine House of Representatives committees
- Commission on Higher Education
- Technical Education and Skills Development Authority
