= Legislative districts of Davao =

Legislative District of the Philippines

The legislative district of Davao was the representation of the historical province of Davao in the various national legislatures of the Philippines until its dissolution in 1967.

The undivided province's representation encompassed the present-day provinces of Davao de Oro, Davao del Norte, Davao del Sur, Davao Occidental, and Davao Oriental. Except during the Second World War, the chartered city of Davao also formed part of the province's representation.

== History ==
Initially being excluded from representation in the lower house of the Philippine Legislature in 1907, the then-non-Christian-majority areas of the Philippines — which included the Department of Mindanao and Sulu, of which Davao was part — were finally extended legislative representation with the passage of the Philippine Autonomy Act in 1916 by the United States Congress. The Revised Administrative Code (Act No. 2711) enacted on 10 March 1917 further elaborated on the manner by which these areas would be represented. The non-Christian areas were to be collectively represented in the upper house's 12th senatorial district by two senators, both appointed by the Governor-General. Five assembly members, also appointed by the Governor-General, were to represent the seven component provinces of Department of Mindanao and Sulu — Agusan, Bukidnon, Cotabato, Davao, Lanao, Sulu and Zamboanga — in the lower house as a single at-large district. These arrangements remained in place despite the abolition of the Department in 1920.

The voters of Davao Province were finally given the right to elect their own representative through popular vote beginning in 1935 by virtue of Article VI, Section 1 of the 1935 Constitution.

During the Second World War, the Province of Davao sent two delegates to the National Assembly of the Japanese-sponsored Second Philippine Republic: one was the provincial governor (an ex officio member), while the other was elected through a provincial assembly of KALIBAPI members during the Japanese occupation of the Philippines. Davao City, being a chartered city, was represented separately in this short-lived legislative body. Upon the restoration of the Philippine Commonwealth in 1945, the representations of Davao Province and Davao City were once again combined to form a lone congressional district.

The enactment of Republic Act No. 4867 on 8 May 1967 split the old Davao Province into Davao del Norte, Davao del Sur and Davao Oriental, and providing each new province a congressional district. The last representative of the undivided Davao Province, Rep. Lorenzo Sarmiento, began to solely serve as the representative of his chosen successor province (Davao del Norte) in the second half of the 6th Congress, per Section 4 of R.A. 4867. The first representatives of Davao del Sur (including Davao City) and Davao Oriental also began to serve their new provinces in the second half of the 6th Congress.

== Lone District (defunct) ==
Period	Representative
1st National Assembly; 1935–1938	Romualdo Quimpo
2nd National Assembly; 1938–1941	Cesar M. Sotto
1st Commonwealth Congress; 1945	Juan A. Sarenas
1st Congress; 1946–1949	Apolinario Cabigon
2nd Congress; 1949–1953	Ismael L. Veloso
3rd Congress; 1953–1957	Ismael L. Veloso
4th Congress; 1957–1961	Gavino R. Sepulveda
5th Congress; 1961–1965	Ismael L. Veloso
6th Congress; 1965–1969	Lorenzo S. Sarmiento^{1}
6th Congress; 1965–1969	see Lone districts of Davao del Norte, Davao del Sur and Davao Oriental

^1 Elected in 1965 as representative for the undivided province of Davao; began to serve as the representative of Davao del Norte beginning in the second half of the 6th Congress, after the separate representatives for Davao del Sur and Davao Oriental took office, pursuant to R.A. 4867.

== At-Large (defunct) ==
- includes what are now the provinces of Davao de Oro (Compostela Valley), Davao del Norte, Davao del Sur, Davao Occidental and Davao Oriental
- excludes Davao City

Period	Representatives
National Assembly; 1943–1944	Juan A. Sarenas
National Assembly; 1943–1944	Romualdo C. Quimpo (ex officio)

== See also ==
- Legislative district of Mindanao and Sulu
- Legislative district of Davao del Norte
  - Legislative districts of Davao de Oro
- Legislative district of Davao del Sur
  - Legislative districts of Davao City
  - Legislative district of Davao Occidental
- Legislative district of Davao Oriental
