= Angelo Palmones =

Filipino broadcaster and former legislator

Member of the House of Representatives of the Philippines for AGHAM
- In office June 30, 2010 – June 30, 2013

Personal details
- Party: AGHAM
- Education: Notre Dame of Kidapawan College
- Occupation: Broadcaster; journalist; politician

Angelo B. Palmones is a Filipino broadcaster, science journalist, and former legislator. He represented the AGHAM party-list in the House of Representatives of the Philippines from 2010 to 2013. Before entering the House, he held reporting and management positions at DZMM and became director of ABS-CBN's Integrated AM Radio Network. He later joined DZRH and, as of 2026, was a senior program host at MBC Media Group.

== Early life and education ==
Palmones grew up in Cotabato. He began working in media while a third-year student at Notre Dame of Kidapawan College, where he earned a degree in economics.

== Broadcasting career ==
Palmones worked for six years as a reporter at DZXL before he was hired by ABS-CBN. At DZMM, he held reporting, monitoring, anchoring, and newsroom-management roles. He was appointed station manager in 1998, succeeding Frankie Evangelista. By 2002 he was director of ABS-CBN's Integrated AM Radio Network. His programs included the science-and-technology show Bago Yan, Ah!, Magandang Umaga, Magandang Pilipinas, and Radyo Patrol Balita Afternoon Edition.

While Palmones was DZMM's station manager and an anchor, the station was named Best AM Radio Station at the 2005 KBP Golden Dove Awards, and Radyo Patrol Balita received the award for Best Radio Newscast.

After his term in Congress, Palmones resumed regular broadcasting. He co-hosted the DZRH science program Radyo Henyo with Ruby Cristobal; in 2016, the program carried a radio drama series produced by the Department of Science and Technology. In January 2018, the Inquirer Bandera reported that he had returned as a DZRH morning news anchor, taking over the time slot previously held by Joe Taruc.

== House of Representatives ==
In the 2010 party-list election, the Commission on Elections awarded AGHAM one seat, with Palmones listed as its first nominee. He served for one term in the 15th Congress. In September 2010, the Philippine Council for Agriculture, Aquatic and Natural Resources Research and Development described him as AGHAM's president and reported that increasing government spending on research and development was among his legislative priorities.

Palmones was among the authors of House Bill No. 6546, the proposed PAGASA Modernization Act of 2012. The measure called for a three-year program to upgrade the equipment, facilities, operating systems, and workforce of the Philippine Atmospheric, Geophysical and Astronomical Services Administration. The House approved the bill on third reading in September 2012, but Congress adjourned in 2013 without enacting it. A later measure was enacted as the PAGASA Modernization Act of 2015.

In December 2012, Palmones introduced House Bill No. 6725, the Philippine Space Act of 2012. It proposed the creation of a Philippine Space Agency and a Philippine Space Commission to coordinate national space activities. The bill did not pass during the 15th Congress.

== Science communication and advocacy ==
Palmones's broadcasting work has frequently focused on science, disaster preparedness, and environmental issues. He also supported science-writing programs for students; in 2011, he addressed a campus-journalism training program organized by the Philippine Council for Agriculture, Aquatic and Natural Resources Research and Development.

In 2017, the Department of Agriculture's biotechnology program named Palmones one of its Filipino Faces of Biotechnology, citing his science advocacy and communication about biotechnology for food security and industrial development. In 2023, he became chairperson of Science Communicators Philippines, an organization formed to promote public understanding of science.
