= AGHAM Partylist =

AGHAM
- — Philippine partylist —
- Full name: Alyansa ng mga Grupong Haligi ng Agham at Teknolohiya para sa Mamamayan
- President: Angelo B. Palmones
- Sector(s) represented: Science and technology
- Founder: Raymundo Punongbayan
- Founded: 2003; 22 years ago
- Delisted: 2018
- Headquarters: Mandaluyong, Metro Manila

Website
- aghampartylist.com

Alyansa ng mga Grupong Haligi ng Agham at Teknolohiya para sa Mamamayan (lit. Alliance of Groups Supporting Science and Technology for the People), commonly referred to simply by its acronym AGHAM (Filipino: Agham or "Science"), is a national sectoral organization in the Philippines pushing for the participation of the science and technology community in the legislative process. It is currently running for a seat in the Philippine House of Representatives, under the party list system.

AGHAM was founded by Dr. Raymundo Punongbayan, former head of the Philippine Institute of Volcanology and Seismology (PHIVOLCS), after being frustrated by the lack of concrete advocacy for disaster preparedness and other science-related issues, both in the Philippine media and the Philippine government.

AGHAM's membership includes "Filipino Science and mathematics teachers, field and laboratory research technicians and laborers, extension agents, engineers, inventors, health professionals, and science media practitioners and otherwise ordinary Filipino citizens who strongly advocate a science and technology-explicit national development agenda."

== Name recall ==
This organization should not be confused with an older organization, Advocates of Science and Technology for the People, which is more popularly known as Agham. Agham is not affiliated with nor has any participation in this partylist. "Agham" or "Samahan ng Nagtataguyod ng Agham at Teknolohiya Para sa Sambayanan" (Filipino, "Advocates of Science and Technology for the People") was founded in 1999 and has declared its support for another partylist Bayan Muna. The older AGHAM organization filed a complaint before the Commission on Election saying that the more recent organization's use of "Agham" might cause confusion.

== Electoral performance ==
| Election | Votes | % | Seats |
|---|---|---|---|
| 2007 | 146,062 | 0.91% | 0 / 53 |
| 2010 | 242,630 | 0.81% | 1 / 57 |
| 2013 | 130,694 | 0.47% | 0 / 59 |
| 2016 | 140,661 | 0.43% | 0 / 59 |

== Representatives to Congress ==
| Period | 1st Representative | 2nd Representative | 3rd Representative |
|---|---|---|---|
| 15th Congress; 2010–2013 | Angelo B. Palmones | — | — |
| 18th Congress; 2019–2022 | Out of Congress | | |
| 19th Congress; 2022–2025 | Out of Congress | | |
