= Manuel E. Zamora =

Filipino politician (born 1950)

Manuel Zamora
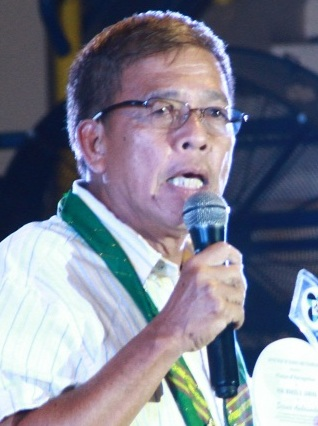
- Zamora in 2015

Mayor of Monkayo
- In office June 30, 2022 – June 30, 2025
- Vice Mayor: Manuel Brillantes Jr.
- Preceded by: Ramil Gentugaya
- Succeeded by: Manuel Zamora Jr.

Member of the Philippine House of Representatives from Davao de Oro's 1st District
- In office June 30, 2019 – June 30, 2022
- Preceded by: Maria Carmen Zamora
- Succeeded by: Maria Carmen Zamora
- In office June 30, 2001 – June 30, 2010
- Preceded by: Rogelio Sarmiento
- Succeeded by: Maria Carmen Zamora

Vice Governor of Compostela Valley
- In office June 30, 2013 – June 30, 2019
- Governor: Arturo Uy (2013–2016); Tyron Uy (2016–2019)
- Preceded by: Ramil L. Gentugaya
- Succeeded by: Maria Carmen Zamora

Personal details
- Born: November 16, 1950 (age 75)
- Party: PDP–Laban (2016–present); HNP (2018–present)
- Other political affiliations: Liberal (2012–2016); Lakas–CMD (1998–2012)
- Children: Maricar Zamora
- Profession: Agriculturist and farmer

Manuel Esquivel "Way Kurat" Zamora (born November 16, 1950) is a Filipino politician. He last served as mayor of Monkayo, Davao de Oro, from 2022 to 2025. A former member of Lakas–CMD, he has been elected to three terms as a Member of the House of Representatives of the Philippines, representing the 1st District of Davao de Oro (formerly Compostela Valley). First elected in 2001, he was re-elected in 2004 and 2007, and again in 2019.

Zamora is an agriculturist and farmer by profession. He has attracted media attention for his colorful personality and for habits such as regularly commuting from home to work in Congress on a bicycle. His life story was once featured on the ABS-CBN anthology series Maalaala Mo Kaya.

In the 18th Congress, Zamora was the vice-chairman of the House Committee on Appropriations and a member of the Committees on Accounts, Games and Amusements, and Overseas Workers Affairs.

== Notes ==
House of Representatives of the Philippines
Preceded by Rogelio Sarmiento	Representative, 1st District of Compostela Valley; 2001–2010	Succeeded by Maria Carmen Zamora
Preceded by Maria Carmen Zamora	Representative, 1st District of Davao de Oro; 2019–2022	Succeeded by Maria Carmen Zamora
Political offices
Preceded by Ramil Gentugaya	Mayor of Monkayo; 2022–2025	Succeeded by Manuel Zamora Jr.
Preceded by Ramil Gentugaya	Vice Governor of Compostela Valley; 2013–2019	Succeeded by Maria Carmen Zamora
