= Legislative districts of Romblon =

Legislative districts in the Philippines

The legislative districts of Romblon are the representations of the province of Romblon in the various national legislatures of the Philippines. The province is currently represented in the lower house of the Congress of the Philippines through its lone congressional district.

== History ==
Romblon, then part of the province of Capiz, initially had two delegates, appointed at-large, to the Malolos Congress in 1898; this remained so until 1899. Romblon was represented as part of the third district of Capiz from 1907 to 1919. It was later reestablished as a separate province in 1917, thus its separate representation was restored, electing one representative this time in 1919.

Romblon was represented in the Interim Batasang Pambansa as part of Region IV-A from 1978 to 1984, and returned one representative, elected at large, to the Regular Batasang Pambansa in 1984.

== List of Lone District Representatives ==
Period	Representative
5th Philippine Legislature; 1919–1922	Leonardo Festin
6th Philippine Legislature; 1922–1925	Leonardo Festin
7th Philippine Legislature; 1925–1928	Leonardo Festin
8th Philippine Legislature; 1928–1931	Leonardo Festin
9th Philippine Legislature; 1931–1934	Leonardo Festin
10th Philippine Legislature; 1934–1935	Leonardo Festin
1st National Assembly; 1935–1938	Gabriel Fabella
2nd National Assembly; 1938–1941	Leonardo Festin
1st Commonwealth Congress; 1945	Leonardo Festin
1st Congress; 1946–1949	Modesto Formilleza
2nd Congress; 1949–1953	Florencio Moreno
3rd Congress; 1953–1957	Florencio Moreno
4th Congress; 1957–1961	Jose D. Moreno
5th Congress; 1961–1965	Jose D. Moreno
6th Congress; 1965–1969	Jose D. Moreno
7th Congress; 1969 – 23 September 1972	Esteban Solidum Madrona
Dictatorship; 21 September 1972 – 21 September 1976	Congress abolished
Batasang Bayan under Dictatorship; 21 September 1976 – 12 June 1978	Congress abolished
Interim Batasang Pambansa; 12 June 1978 – 5 June 1984	Nemesio V. Ganan Jr.
National Assembly; 30 June 1984 – 25 March 1986	Natalio M. Beltran Jr.
Revolutionary Government; 25 March 1986 – 27 July 1987	Natalio M. Beltran Jr.
8th Congress; 27 July 1987 – 30 June 1992	Natalio M. Beltran Jr.
9th Congress; 30 June 1992 – 30 June 1995	Eleandro Jesus Fabic Madrona
10th Congress; 30 June 1995 – 30 June 1998	Eleandro Jesus Fabic Madrona
11th Congress; 30 June 1998 – 30 June 2001	Eleandro Jesus Fabic Madrona
12th Congress; 30 June 2001 – 30 June 2004	Perpetuo Barredo Ylagan
13th Congress; 30 June 2004 – 30 June 2007	Eduardo Chang Firmalo
14th Congress; 30 June 2007 – 30 June 2010	Eleandro Jesus Fabic Madrona
15th Congress; 30 June 2010 – 30 June 2013	Eleandro Jesus Fabic Madrona
16th Congress; 30 June 2013 – 30 June 2016	Eleandro Jesus Fabic Madrona
17th Congress; 30 June 2016 – 30 June 2019	Emmanuel Fabic Madrona
18th Congress; 30 June 2019 – 30 June 2022	Eleandro Jesus Fabic Madrona
19th Congress; 30 June 2022 – 30 June 2025	Eleandro Jesus Fabic Madrona
20th Congress; 30 June 2025 – incumbent	Eleandro Jesus Fabic Madrona
