= Legislative districts of Davao del Sur =

The legislative districts of Davao del Sur are the representations of the province of Davao del Sur in the various national legislatures of the Philippines. The province is currently represented in the lower house of the Congress of the Philippines through its lone congressional district.

Davao City and Davao Occidental last formed part of the province's representation in 1972 and 2016, respectively.

== History ==
Prior to gaining separate representation, areas now under the jurisdiction of Davao del Sur were represented under the Department of Mindanao and Sulu (1917–1935) and the historical Davao Province (1935–1967).

The enactment of Republic Act No. 4867 on May 8, 1967 split the old Davao Province into Davao del Norte, Davao del Sur and Davao Oriental. Per Section 4 of R.A. 4867, the incumbent Davao Province representative was to indicate which of the three new provinces he wished to continue to represent; Rep. Lorenzo Sarmiento chose Davao del Norte, which left the seats for Davao del Sur (together grouped with the chartered city of Davao) and Davao Oriental open for the special elections scheduled for November 14, 1967. Davao del Sur, along with Davao City, were represented together from the second half of the 6th Congress until the end of the 7th Congress.

Davao del Sur was represented in the Interim Batasang Pambansa as part of Region XI from 1978 to 1984, and returned two representatives, elected at-large, to the Regular Batasang Pambansa in 1984. Davao City separately elected its own representatives starting that year.

Under the new Constitution which was proclaimed on February 11, 1987, Davao del Sur was reapportioned into two congressional districts; each elected its member to the restored House of Representatives starting that same year.

The passage of Republic Act No. 10360 and its subsequent ratification by plebiscite in 2013 separated five southern municipalities of Davao del Sur to create the province of Davao Occidental. Per Section 7 of R.A. 10360, Davao del Sur's own representation was reduced to a single congressional district. The newly reconfigured lone district elected its representative in the 2016 elections.

== Lone District ==
- Population (2015): 632,588

Period	Representative
17th Congress; 2016–2019	Mercedes "Didi" C. Cagas
18th Congress; 2019–2022	Mercedes "Didi" C. Cagas
19th Congress; 2022–2025	John Tracy F. Cagas
20th Congress; 2025–2028	John Tracy F. Cagas

=== 1968–1972 ===
- includes the present-day city and province of Davao and Davao Occidental

Period	Representative
6th Congress; 1965–1969	see Lone district of Davao
6th Congress; 1965–1969	Artemio Al Loyola (Note: Won the special election held on November 14, 1967 to fill the new province's congressional seat; took oath of office on January 22, 1968 and served for the remainder of the 6th Congress.)
7th Congress; 1969–1972	Artemio Al Loyola

== 1st District (defunct) ==
- City: Digos (became city 2000)
- Municipalities: Bansalan, Hagonoy, Magsaysay, Matanao, Padada, Santa Cruz

Period	Representative
8th Congress; 1987–1992	Juanito G. Camasura, Jr.
9th Congress; 1992–1995	Alejandro D. Almendras, Sr.
10th Congress; 1995–1998	Alejandro "Landring" Almendras, Jr.
11th Congress; 1998–2001	Douglas R.A. Cagas
12th Congress; 2001–2004	Douglas R.A. Cagas
13th Congress; 2004–2007	Douglas R.A. Cagas
14th Congress; 2007–2010	Marc Douglas Cagas IV
15th Congress; 2010–2013	Marc Douglas Cagas IV
16th Congress; 2013–2016	Mercedes "Didi" C. Cagas

== 2nd District (defunct) ==
- Municipalities: Don Marcelino, Jose Abad Santos, Kiblawan, Malalag, Malita, Santa Maria, Sarangani, Sulop

Period	Representative
8th Congress; 1987–1992	Benjamin V. Bautista, Sr.
9th Congress; 1992–1995	Benjamin V. Bautista, Sr.
10th Congress; 1995–1998	Benjamin V. Bautista, Sr.
11th Congress; 1998–2001	Franklin P. Bautista
12th Congress; 2001–2004	Claude P. Bautista
13th Congress; 2004–2007	Claude P. Bautista
14th Congress; 2007–2010	Franklin P. Bautista
15th Congress; 2010–2013	Franklin P. Bautista
16th Congress; 2013–2016	Franklin P. Bautista

== At-Large (defunct) ==
- includes the present-day province of Davao Occidental

Period	Representatives
Regular Batasang Pambansa; 1984–1986	Alejandro D. Almendras Sr.
Regular Batasang Pambansa; 1984–1986	Douglas R.A. Cagas

== See also ==
- Legislative district of Mindanao and Sulu
- Legislative district of Davao
- Legislative districts of Davao City
- Legislative district of Davao Occidental
