= Legislative districts of Davao Oriental =

Districts of Philippine province

The legislative districts of Davao Oriental are the representations of the province of Davao Oriental in the various national legislatures of the Philippines. The province is currently represented in the lower house of the Congress of the Philippines through its first and second congressional districts.

== History ==
Prior to gaining separate representation, areas now under the jurisdiction of Davao Oriental were represented under the Department of Mindanao and Sulu (1917–1935) and the historical Davao Province (1935–1967).

The enactment of Republic Act No. 4867 on May 8, 1967, split the old Davao Province into Davao del Norte, Davao del Sur and Davao Oriental. Per Section 4 of R.A. 4867, the incumbent Davao Province representative was to indicate which of the three new provinces he wished to continue to represent; Rep. Lorenzo Sarmiento chose Davao del Norte, which left the seats for Davao del Sur (together grouped with the chartered city of Davao) and Davao Oriental open for the special elections scheduled for November 14, 1967. Davao Oriental comprised a single congressional district from the second half of the 6th Congress until the end of the 7th Congress.

Davao Oriental was represented in the Interim Batasang Pambansa as part of Region XI from 1978 to 1984, and returned one representative, elected at large, to the Regular Batasang Pambansa in 1984.

Under the new Constitution which was proclaimed on February 11, 1987, the province was reapportioned into two congressional districts; each elected its member to the restored House of Representatives starting that same year.

== 1st District ==
- Municipalities: Baganga, Boston, Caraga, Cateel, Manay, Tarragona
- Population (2020): 223,811

Period	Representative
8th Congress; 1987–1992	Enrico G. Dayanghirang
9th Congress; 1992–1995	Ma. Elena T. Palma-Gil
10th Congress; 1995–1998	Ma. Elena T. Palma-Gil
11th Congress; 1998–2001	Ma. Elena T. Palma-Gil
12th Congress; 2001–2004	Corazon N. Malanyaon
13th Congress; 2004–2007	Corazon N. Malanyaon
14th Congress; 2007–2010	Nelson L. Dayanghirang
15th Congress; 2010–2013	Nelson L. Dayanghirang
16th Congress; 2013–2016	Nelson L. Dayanghirang
17th Congress; 2016–2019	Corazon N. Malanyaon
18th Congress; 2019–2022	Corazon N. Malanyaon
19th Congress; 2022–2025	Nelson L. Dayanghirang
20th Congress; 2025–2028	Nelson Dayanghirang Jr.

== 2nd District ==
- City: Mati (became city 2007)
- Municipalities: Banaybanay, Governor Generoso, Lupon, San Isidro
- Population (2020): 352,532

Period	Representative
8th Congress; 1987–1992	Thelma Z. Almario
9th Congress; 1992–1995	Thelma Z. Almario
10th Congress; 1995–1998	Thelma Z. Almario
11th Congress; 1998–2001	Joel Mayo Z. Almario
12th Congress; 2001–2004	Joel Mayo Z. Almario
13th Congress; 2004–2007	Joel Mayo Z. Almario
14th Congress; 2007–2010	Thelma Z. Almario
15th Congress; 2010–2013	Thelma Z. Almario
16th Congress; 2013–2016	Thelma Z. Almario
17th Congress; 2016–2019	Joel Mayo Z. Almario
18th Congress; 2019–2022	Joel Mayo Z. Almario
19th Congress; 2022–2025	Cheeno Miguel D. Almario
20th Congress; 2025–2028	Cheeno Miguel D. Almario

== Lone District (defunct) ==
Period	Representative
6th Congress; 1965–1969	see Lone district of Davao
6th Congress; 1965–1969	Constancio P. Maglana (Note: Won the special election held on November 14, 1967 to fill the new province's congressional seat; took oath of office on January 22, 1968 and served for the remainder of the 6th Congress.)
7th Congress; 1969–1972	Constancio P. Maglana

== At-Large (defunct) ==
Period	Representative
Regular Batasang Pambansa; 1984–1986	Merced Edith N. Rabat

== See also ==
- Legislative district of Mindanao and Sulu
- Legislative district of Davao
