= Legislative districts of Davao City =

The legislative districts of Davao City are the representations of the highly urbanized city of Davao in the various national legislatures of the Philippines. The city is currently represented in the lower house of the Congress of the Philippines through its first, second, and third congressional districts.

== History ==
Except during the Second World War, areas now under the jurisdiction of Davao City were previously represented as part of the Department of Mindanao and Sulu (1917–1935), the historical Davao Province (1935–1967), Davao del Sur (1967–1972) and Region XI (1978–1984).

Being a chartered city, two delegates represented Davao City in the National Assembly of the Japanese-sponsored Second Philippine Republic: one was the city mayor (an ex officio member), while the other was elected through an assembly of KALIBAPI members within the city during the Japanese occupation of the Philippines. After the war Davao City reverted to its pre-war representation under the province of Davao, which lasted until 1967.

The enactment of Republic Act No. 4867 on May 8, 1967 split the old Davao Province into the new provinces of Davao del Norte, Davao del Sur and Davao Oriental, and provided each of them with separate representation. Per Section 5 of R.A. 4867, Davao City was grouped with Davao del Sur for the purposes of electing members of Congress; this was the arrangement from the second half of the 6th Congress until the end of the 7th Congress. The city was also represented in the Interim Batasang Pambansa as part of Region XI from 1978 to 1984.

By virtue of having been classified as a highly urbanized city on December 22, 1979 through Batas Pambansa Blg. 51, Davao City regained separate representation in the succeeding Regular Batasang Pambansa, electing two representatives, at-large, in 1984.

Under the new Constitution which was proclaimed on February 11, 1987, the city was reapportioned into three congressional districts; each district elected its member to the restored House of Representatives starting that same year.

== Current districts ==
The city was last apportioned upon the proclamation of the 1987 Constitution, where it was granted three seats in Congress. The city's current congressional delegation composes of three members of the Hugpong sa Tawong Lungsod. All three representatives are part of the independent bloc in the 20th Congress.

Legislative districts and representatives of Davao City
District	Current Representative			Constituent LGUs	Area	Population (2020)
District	Image	Name	Party	Constituent LGUs	Area	Population (2020)
1st		Paolo Duterte (since 2019); Catalunan Grande	HTL	List: Poblacion; Talomo	97.47 km^{2}	618,729
2nd		Omar Duterte (since 2025); Buhangin Proper	HTL	List: Agdao; Buhangin; Bunawan; Paquibato	830.37 km^{2}	634,158
3rd		Isidro Ungab (since 2019); Calinan Poblacion	HTL	List: Baguio; Calinan; Marilog; Toril; Tugbok	1,298.97 km^{2}	524,062

== At-Large (defunct) ==
=== 1943–1944 ===
Period	Representatives
National Assembly; 1943–1944	Celestino Chavez
National Assembly; 1943–1944	Alfonso G. Oboza (ex officio)

=== 1984–1986 ===
Period	Representatives
Regular Batasang Pambansa; 1984–1986	Manuel M. Garcia
Regular Batasang Pambansa; 1984–1986	Zafiro L. Respicio

== See also ==
- Legislative district of Mindanao and Sulu
- Legislative district of Davao
- Legislative district of Davao del Sur
