= Legislative districts of Davao de Oro =

The congressional districts of Davao de Oro.

The legislative districts of Davao de Oro are the representations of the province of Davao de Oro in the various national legislatures of the Philippines. The province is currently represented in the lower house of the Congress of the Philippines through its first and second congressional districts.

== History ==
Prior to gaining separate representation, areas now under the jurisdiction of Davao de Oro were represented under the Department of Mindanao and Sulu (1917–1935), Davao Province (1935–1967), Region XI (1978–1984) and Davao del Norte (1967–1972; 1984–1998).

The passage of Republic Act No. 8470 on 30 January 1998 and its subsequent ratification by plebiscite on 7 March 1998 separated from Davao del Norte's first and second districts a total of eleven municipalities to create the new province of Compostela Valley (now named Davao de Oro), which itself was apportioned into two new congressional districts. The new province's two districts first elected their own representatives in the 1998 elections.

== 1st District ==
- Municipalities: Compostela, Maragusan, Monkayo, Montevista, New Bataan
- Population (2020): 346,257

Period	Representative
11th Congress; 1998–2001	Rogelio M. Sarmiento
12th Congress; 2001–2004	Manuel E. Zamora
13th Congress; 2004–2007	Manuel E. Zamora
14th Congress; 2007–2010	Manuel E. Zamora
15th Congress; 2010–2013	Ma. Carmen S. Zamora-Apsay
16th Congress; 2013–2016	Ma. Carmen S. Zamora-Apsay
17th Congress; 2016–2019	Ma. Carmen S. Zamora-Apsay
18th Congress; 2019–2022	Manuel E. Zamora
19th Congress; 2022–2025	Ma. Carmen S. Zamora-Apsay
20th Congress; 2025–2028	Ma. Carmen S. Zamora-Apsay

== 2nd District ==
- Municipalities: Laak, Mabini, Maco, Mawab, Nabunturan, Pantukan
- Population (2020): 421,290

Period	Representative
11th Congress; 1998–2001	Prospero S. Amatong
12th Congress; 2001–2004	Prospero S. Amatong
13th Congress; 2004–2007	Prospero S. Amatong
14th Congress; 2007–2010	Rommel C. Amatong
15th Congress; 2010–2013	Rommel C. Amatong
16th Congress; 2013–2016	Rommel C. Amatong
17th Congress; 2016–2019	Ruwel Peter S. Gonzaga
18th Congress; 2019–2022	Ruwel Peter S. Gonzaga
19th Congress; 2022–2025	Ruwel Peter S. Gonzaga
20th Congress; 2025–2028	Jhong Ceniza

== See also ==
- Legislative district of Mindanao and Sulu
- Legislative district of Davao
- Legislative districts of Davao del Norte
