= Legislative districts of Davao del Norte =

Legislative District of the Philippines

The legislative districts of Davao del Norte are the representation of the province of Davao del Norte in the various national legislatures of the Philippines. The province is currently represented in the lower house of the Congress of the Philippines through its first and second congressional districts.

== History ==
Prior to gaining separate representation, areas now under the jurisdiction of Davao del Norte were represented under the Department of Mindanao and Sulu (1917–1935) and the historical Davao Province (1935–1967).

The enactment of Republic Act No. 4867 on May 8, 1967, split the old Davao Province into Davao del Norte, Davao del Sur and Davao Oriental. Per Section 4 of R.A. 4867, the incumbent Davao Province representative was to indicate which of the three new provinces he wished to continue to represent; Rep. Lorenzo Sarmiento chose to represent Davao del Norte. Davao del Sur (grouped together with Davao City) and Davao Oriental were separately represented beginning in the second half of the 6th Congress after special elections were held on November 14, 1967, to fill their new congressional seats.

Davao del Norte — officially renamed to "Davao" in 1972 — was represented in the Interim Batasang Pambansa as part of Region XI from 1978 to 1984. The province returned three representatives, elected at-large, to the Regular Batasang Pambansa in 1984.

Under the new Constitution which was proclaimed on February 11, 1987, the province was reapportioned into three congressional districts; each district elected its member to the restored House of Representatives starting that same year.

Apart from restoring the name of the province to Davao del Norte, the passage of Republic Act No. 8470 and its subsequent ratification by plebiscite on March 7, 1998, separated the province's eleven eastern municipalities to create the new province of Compostela Valley (now named Davao de Oro). Per Section 3 of Republic Act No. 8470, Davao del Norte's own representation was reduced to two districts. The newly reconfigured districts elected their own representatives beginning in the 1998 elections.

== 1st District ==
- City: Tagum
- Municipalities: Asuncion, Kapalong, New Corella, Talaingod, Sawata (established 2004)
- Population (2020): 542,642

Period	Representative
11th Congress; 1998–2001	Pantaleon D. Alvarez (Note: Appointed Secretary of Transportation and Communications on January 24, 2001. Seat remained vacant until the end of the 11th Congress.)
11th Congress; 1998–2001	vacant
12th Congress; 2001–2004	Arrel R. Olaño
13th Congress; 2004–2007	Arrel R. Olaño
14th Congress; 2007–2010	Arrel R. Olaño
15th Congress; 2010–2013	Antonio Rafael G. Del Rosario
16th Congress; 2013–2016	Antonio Rafael G. Del Rosario
17th Congress; 2016–2019	Pantaleon D. Alvarez
18th Congress; 2019–2022	Pantaleon D. Alvarez
19th Congress; 2022–2025	Pantaleon D. Alvarez
20th Congress; 2025–2028	De Carlo Uy

=== 1987–1998 ===
- Municipalities: Compostela, Maragusan (San Mariano), Montevista, Monkayo, New Bataan, Mawab, Nabunturan

Period	Representative
8th Congress; 1987–1992	Lorenzo Sarmiento
9th Congress; 1992–1995	Rogelio M. Sarmiento
10th Congress; 1995–1998	Rogelio M. Sarmiento

== 2nd District ==
- Cities: Panabo (became city 2001), Samal
- Municipalities: Braulio E. Dujali, Carmen, Santo Tomas
- Population (2020): 572,415

Period	Representative
11th Congress; 1998–2001	Antonio R. Floirendo, Jr.
12th Congress; 2001–2004	Antonio R. Floirendo, Jr.
13th Congress; 2004–2007	Antonio R. Floirendo, Jr.
14th Congress; 2007–2010	Antonio F. Lagdameo, Jr.
15th Congress; 2010–2013	Antonio F. Lagdameo, Jr.
16th Congress; 2013–2016	Antonio F. Lagdameo, Jr.
17th Congress; 2016–2019	Antonio R. Floirendo, Jr.
18th Congress; 2019–2022	Alan R. Dujali
19th Congress; 2022–2025	Alan R. Dujali
20th Congress; 2025–2028	Jose Manuel Lagdameo

=== 1987–1998 ===
- Municipalities: Asuncion, Laak (San Vicente), Mabini, New Corella, Pantukan, Tagum (became city 1998), Maco

Period	Representative
8th Congress; 1987–1992	Baltazar A. Sator
9th Congress; 1992–1995	Baltazar A. Sator
10th Congress; 1995–1998	Baltazar A. Sator

== 3rd District (defunct) ==
- Municipalities: Babak (annexed to Samal 1998), Carmen, Kapalong, Kaputian (annexed to Samal 1998), Panabo, Samal (Peñaplata) (became city 1998), Santo Tomas, Talaingod (established 1991), Braulio E. Dujali (established 1998)

Period	Representative
8th Congress; 1987–1992	Rodolfo P. Del Rosario
9th Congress; 1992–1995	Rodolfo P. Del Rosario
10th Congress; 1995–1998	Rodolfo P. Del Rosario

== Lone District (defunct) ==
- includes the present-day province of Davao de Oro

Period	Representative
6th Congress; 1965–1969	see Lone district of Davao
6th Congress; 1965–1969	Lorenzo Sarmiento (Note: Elected in 1965 as representative for the undivided province of Davao; served as Davao del Norte's own representative beginning in the second half of the 6th Congress after separate representatives for Davao del Sur and Davao Oriental took office.)
7th Congress; 1969–1972	Lorenzo Sarmiento

== At-Large (defunct) ==
- includes the present-day province of Davao de Oro

Period	Representatives
Regular Batasang Pambansa; 1984–1986	Rodolfo P. Del Rosario
Regular Batasang Pambansa; 1984–1986	Rolando C. Marcial
Regular Batasang Pambansa; 1984–1986	Rogelio M. Sarmiento

== See also ==
- Legislative district of Mindanao and Sulu
- Legislative district of Davao
- Legislative districts of Davao de Oro
