= Legislative districts of Batangas =

Legislative districts in the Philippines

The legislative districts of Batangas are the representations of the province of Batangas in the various national and local legislatures of the Philippines. At present, the province is represented in the House of Representatives of the Philippines by its six congressional districts, with the districts' representatives being elected every three years. Additionally, each district is allotted two seats in the Batangas Provincial Board, creating a total of twelve elective seats in the legislature.

== History ==
Batangas was initially composed of one representative district, wherein it elected four representatives, at large, to the Malolos Congress in 1898. It was later divided into three representative districts in 1907 for the Philippine Assembly, with a minor adjustment of district boundaries as mandated by Act No. 3378 (enacted on December 3, 1927) taking effect starting in the 1928 elections. When seats for the upper house of the Philippine Legislature were elected from territory-based districts between 1916 and 1935, the province formed part of the fifth senatorial district which elected two out of the 24-member senate. It remained so until 1941.

In the disruption caused by World War II, two delegates represented the province in the National Assembly of the Japanese-sponsored Second Philippine Republic: one was the provincial governor (an ex officio member), while the other was elected through a provincial assembly of KALIBAPI members during the Japanese occupation of the Philippines. Upon the restoration of the Philippine Commonwealth in 1945, the province retained its three pre-war representative districts.

The province was represented in the Interim Batasang Pambansa as part of Region IV-A from 1978 to 1984, and elected four representatives, at large, to the Regular Batasang Pambansa in 1984. Batangas was reapportioned into four congressional districts under the new Constitution which was proclaimed on February 11, 1987, and elected members to the restored House of Representatives starting that same year.

The passage of Republic Act No. 10673 on August 19, 2015, increased the number of the province's representatives from four to six. R.A. No. 10673 separated Batangas City and Lipa from the second and fourth districts, and constituted these cities into the province's fifth and sixth districts, respectively. These two new districts elected their first separate representatives beginning in the 2016 elections.

== Current districts ==
The province was last redistricted in 2015, wherein the province gained two seats in the House. The province's current congressional delegation composes of three members of the Nacionalista Party, two members of Lakas-CMD, and one member of the Nationalist People's Coalition. All six incumbent representatives are part of the majority bloc.

Legislative districts and representatives of Batangas
District	Current Representative		Party	Constituent LGUs	Population (2020)	Area	Map
District	Image	Name	Party	Constituent LGUs	Population (2020)	Area	Map
1st		Leandro Leviste (since 2025); Calatagan	Lakas-CMD	List: Balayan; Calaca; Calatagan; Lemery; Lian; Nasugbu; Taal; Tuy	635,962	924.83 km^{2}	
2nd		Gerville Luistro (since 2022); Mabini	Lakas–CMD	List: Bauan; Lobo; Mabini; San Luis; San Pascual; Tingloy	306,809	399.14 km^{2}	
3rd		King George Leandro Antonio Collantes (since 2025); Tanauan	NPC	List: Agoncillo; Alitagtag; Balete; Cuenca; Laurel; Malvar; Mataasnakahoy; San Nicolas; Santa Teresita; Santo Tomas; Tanauan; Talisay	768,561	545.73 km^{2}	
4th		Amado Carlos Bolilia IV (since 2025); Padre Garcia	Nacionalista	List: Ibaan; Padre Garcia; Rosario; San Jose; San Juan; Taysan	472,794	757.69 km^{2}	
5th		Beverley Rose Dimacuha (since 2025); Batangas City	Nacionalista	Batangas City	351,437	282.96 km^{2}	
6th		Ryan Christian Recto (since 2025); Lipa	Nacionalista	Lipa	372,931	209.40 km^{2}	

== Historical districts and representatives ==
=== At-large (defunct) ===
==== 1898–1899 ====
Period	Representatives
Malolos Congress; 1898–1899	Mariano Lopez
Malolos Congress; 1898–1899	Gregorio Aguilera
Malolos Congress; 1898–1899	Eduardo Gutierrez
Malolos Congress; 1898–1899	Ambrosio Flores

==== 1943–1944 ====
Period	Representatives
National Assembly; 1943–1944	Jose Bayani H. Laurel, Jr.
National Assembly; 1943–1944	Maximo M. Malvar (ex officio)

==== 1984–1986 ====
Period	Representatives
Regular Batasang Pambansa; 1984–1986	Manuel G. Collantes
Regular Batasang Pambansa; 1984–1986	Jose Bayani H. Laurel, Jr.
Regular Batasang Pambansa; 1984–1986	Hernando B. Perez
Regular Batasang Pambansa; 1984–1986	Rafael R. Recto
