= Legislative districts of Rizal =

Legislative district of the Philippines

Map of Rizal's congressional districts since 2022

The legislative districts of Rizal are the representations of the province of Rizal in the various national and local legislatures of the Philippines. At present, the province is represented in the House of Representatives of the Philippines by its four congressional districts, with the districts' representatives being elected every three years. Additionally, each district is allotted a certain number of seats in the Rizal Provincial Board, with board members also being elected every three years.

The component city of Antipolo is represented independently from the province by its own two districts, although it is also represented in the provincial board.

== History ==
Areas now under the jurisdiction of Rizal were represented under the at-large districts of the province of Manila and Morong in the Malolos Congress from 1898 to 1899.

Rizal, established in 1901, was initially divided into two representative districts from 1907 to 2022. From 1907 to 1972, the present-day municipality of Pateros and the cities of Caloocan, Las Piñas, Makati, Malabon, Mandaluyong, Marikina, Muntinlupa, Navotas, Parañaque, Pasay, Pasig, Quezon City, San Juan, and Taguig and, until 1998, Antipolo were part of its representation. When seats for the upper house of the Philippine Legislature were elected from territory-based districts between 1916 and 1935, Rizal formed part of the fourth senatorial district which elected two out of the 24-member senate.

In the disruption caused by World War II, Quezon City, Caloocan, Makati, Mandaluyong, Parañaque, Pasay, and San Juan were incorporated into the City of Greater Manila and were thus represented as part of the at-large district of Manila from 1942 to 1944. The province, meanwhile, was represented by two delegates in the National Assembly of the Japanese-sponsored Second Philippine Republic: one was an ex officio member, while the other was elected through a provincial assembly of KALIBAPI members during the Japanese occupation of the Philippines. Upon the restoration of the Philippine Commonwealth in 1945, the province retained its two pre-war representative districts; this remained so until 1972.

From 1978 to 1984, it was part of the representation of Region IV-A in the Interim Batasang Pambansa, and from 1984 to 1986, it elected two assemblymen at-large in the Regular Batasang Pambansa. It regained its two representative districts under the new Constitution which was proclaimed on February 11, 1987, and elected members to the restored House of Representatives starting that same year. The province has gained two additional legislative districts in 2021 by virtue of Republic Act No. 11533. The districts elected their first representatives in the 2022 Philippine general elections.

== Current districts ==
The province was last redistricted in 2021, wherein the province gained two seats in the house. The province's current congressional delegation composes of two members of the Nationalist People's Coalition, one member of the Liberal Party, and one member of Lakas-CMD. All four representatives are part of the majority bloc.

Legislative districts and representatives of Rizal
District	Current Representative			Constituent LGUs	Population (2024)	Area	Map
District	Image	Name	Party	Constituent LGUs	Population (2024)	Area	Map
1st		Rebecca Maria Ynares (since 2025); Binangonan	NPC	List: Angono; Binangonan; Cainta; Taytay	1,239,688	174.35 km^{2}	
2nd		Dino Tanjuatco (since 2022); Tanay	NPC	List: Baras; Cardona; Jalajala; Morong; Pililla; Tanay; Teresa	535,309	483.75 km^{2}	
3rd		Jose Arturo Garcia Jr. (since 2022); San Mateo	NPC	List: San Mateo	276,449	55.09 km^{2}	
4th		Dennis Hernandez (since 2025); Rodriguez (Montalban)	NPC	List: Rodriguez	451,383	312.70 km^{2}	

== Historical districts ==
=== At-Large (1943–1944) ===
- Excluding Caloocan, Makati, Mandaluyong, Quezon City, Parañaque, Pasay, San Juan

Period	Representative
National Assembly; 1943–1944	Tomas M. Molina (ex officio)
National Assembly; 1943–1944	Nicanor A. Roxas

=== At-Large (1984–1986) ===
Period	Representative
Regular Batasang Pambansa; 1984–1986	Francisco S. Sumulong
Regular Batasang Pambansa; 1984–1986	Emigdio S. Tanjuatco, Jr.

== See also ==
- Legislative districts of Antipolo
- Legislative districts of Caloocan
- Legislative district of Las Piñas–Parañaque
- Legislative districts of Makati
- Legislative district of Malabon–Navotas–Valenzuela
- Legislative district of Pasay
- Legislative district of Pasig–Marikina
- Legislative districts of Quezon City
- Legislative district of San Juan–Mandaluyong
- Legislative district of Taguig–Pateros–Muntinlupa
