= Abante Mindanao =

Political party in the Philippines

- — Philippine partylist —
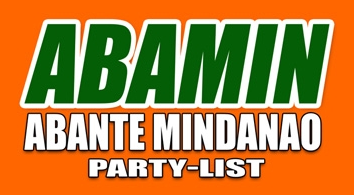
- Full name: Abante Mindanao Inc.
- Abbreviation: Abamin
- Founder: Rufus Rodriguez
- Ideology: Localism
- National affiliation: CDP
- Colors: Orange, Green

Current representation (20th Congress)
- Seats in the House of Representatives: 1 / 3 (Out of 63 party-list seats)
- Representative(s): Maximo Rodriguez Jr.

Abante Mindanao Inc (lit. 'Forward Mindanao')., also known as the Abamin Partylist, is a political organization with party-list representation in the House of Representatives of the Philippines. The partylist group founded by Rufus Rodriguez is associated with a political family based in Cagayan de Oro and has been represented by Maximo Rodriguez Jr. from 2010 to 2016, and since 2025.

== History ==
Abante Mindanao (Abamin) was established by Cagayan de Oro's 2nd district House of Representatives member Rufus Rodriguez Abamin won a seat in the 2010 election which was filled by his younger brother Maximo Rodriguez Jr. The group retained the seat in 2013 but lost in 2016. In 2016, Maximo Rodriguez was not a nominee having been elected to replace his brother as Cagayan de Oro 2nd district representative.

After it failed to win a seat in the 2019 election, the Commission on Elections has considered the cancellation of Abamin's accreditation. Nevertheless, Abante Mindanao was able to win in the House of Representatives after winning a seat in the 2025 election. Maximo returns to the lower house of the Congress as Abamin's nominee.

== Representatives to Congress ==
Period	Representative
15th Congress; 2010–2013	Maximo Rodriguez Jr.
16th Congress; 2013–2016	Maximo Rodriguez Jr.
17th Congress; 2016–2019	Out of Congress
18th Congress; 2019–2022	Out of Congress
19th Congress; 2022–2025	Out of Congress
20th Congress; 2025–2028	Maximo Rodriguez Jr.
Note: A party-list group, can win a maximum of three seats in the House of Representatives.
