= 16th Congress of the Philippines =

37th legislative term of the Philippines

| ← | 15th | 17th | → |
- GSIS Building (2010) (top) and Batasang Pambansa Complex (2010) (bottom)

Overview
- Term: July 22, 2013 – June 6, 2016
- President: Benigno Aquino III
- Vice President: Jejomar Binay

Senate
- Members: 24
- President: Franklin Drilon
- President pro tempore: Ralph Recto
- Majority leader: Alan Peter Cayetano
- Minority leader: Juan Ponce Enrile (until July 28, 2014, and from August 24, 2015); Tito Sotto (acting: July 28, 2014 – August 24, 2015)

House of Representatives
- Members: 293
- Speaker: Feliciano Belmonte Jr.
- Deputy Speakers: Henedina Abad; Giorgidi Aggabao; Sergio Apostol; Pangalian Balindong; Carlos Padilla; Roberto Puno
- Majority leader: Neptali Gonzales II
- Minority leader: Ronaldo Zamora

The 16th Congress of the Philippines (Filipino: Ikalabing-anim na Kongreso ng Pilipinas) composed of the Philippine Senate and House of Representatives, met from July 22, 2013, until June 6, 2016, during the last three years of Benigno Aquino III's presidency. The convening of the 16th Congress followed the 2013 general elections, which replaced half of the Senate membership and the entire membership of the House of Representatives.

== Leadership ==
=== Senate ===
Senate President

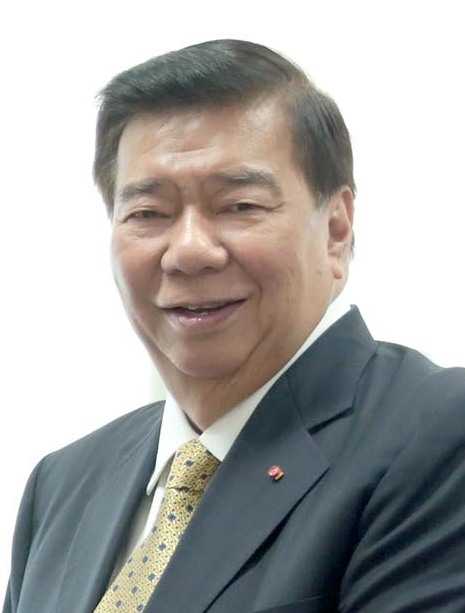
Franklin Drilon

- President: Franklin Drilon (Liberal)
- President pro tempore: Ralph Recto (Liberal)
- Majority Floor Leader: Alan Peter Cayetano (Nacionalista)
- Minority Floor Leader:
  - Juan Ponce Enrile (PMP), until July 28, 2014, and from August 24, 2015
  - Tito Sotto (NPC), acting: July 28, 2014 – August 24, 2015

=== House of Representatives ===
House Speaker

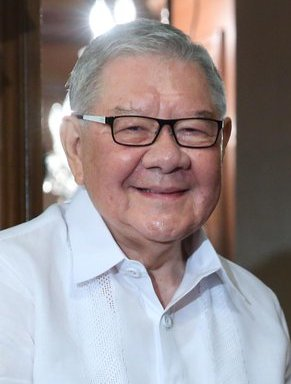
Feliciano Belmonte Jr.

- Speaker: Feliciano Belmonte Jr. (Quezon City–4th, Liberal)
- Deputy Speakers:
  - Henedina Abad (Batanes–Lone, Liberal)
  - Giorgidi Aggabao (Isabela–4th, NPC)
  - Sergio Apostol (Leyte–2nd, Liberal)
  - Pangalian Balindong (Lanao del Sur–2nd, Liberal)
  - Carlos Padilla (Nueva Vizcaya–Lone, Nacionalista)
- Majority Floor Leader: Neptali Gonzales II (Mandaluyong–Lone, Liberal)
- Minority Floor Leader: Ronaldo Zamora (San Juan–Lone, Nacionalista)

== Sessions ==
Senate session on 5 May 2015. Roll call result of 12 members present that constitute a quorum.

- First regular session: July 22, 2013 – June 9, 2014
- Second regular session: July 28, 2014 – May 25, 2015
- Third regular session: July 27, 2015 – May 24, 2016

== Members ==
=== Senate ===
The following are the terms of the senators of this Congress, according to the date of election:

- For senators elected on May 10, 2010: June 30, 2010 – June 30, 2016
- For senators elected on May 13, 2013: June 30, 2013 – June 30, 2019

| Senator | Party | Term | Term end | Bloc | Registered in |
|---|---|---|---|---|---|
| Sonny Angara | LDP | 1 | 2019 | Majority | Baler, Aurora |
| Bam Aquino | Liberal | 1 | 2019 | Majority | Quezon City |
| Nancy Binay | UNA | 1 | 2019 | Minority | Makati |
| Alan Peter Cayetano | Nacionalista | 2 | 2019 | Majority | Taguig |
| Pia Cayetano | Nacionalista | 2 | 2016 | Majority | Taguig |
| Miriam Defensor Santiago | PRP | 2 | 2016 | Majority | Quezon City |
| Franklin Drilon | Liberal | 1 | 2016 | Majority | Iloilo City |
| JV Ejercito | PMP (Note: The Pwersa ng Masang Pilipino was affiliated with the United Nationalist Alliance until 2015.) | 1 | 2019 | Minority | San Juan |
| Francis Escudero | Independent | 2 | 2019 | Majority | Sorsogon City, Sorsogon |
| Jinggoy Estrada (Note: Jinggoy Estrada was detained on June 23, 2014, on plunder charges related to the Priority Development Assistance Fund scam.) | PMP | 2 | 2016 | Minority | San Juan |
| TG Guingona | Liberal | 1 | 2016 | Majority | Malaybalay, Bukidnon |
| Gregorio Honasan | UNA | 2 | 2019 | Minority | Marikina |
| Lito Lapid | Lingap Lugud (Note: Lito Lapid was an independent until 2015.) | 2 | 2016 | Majority | Porac, Pampanga |
| Loren Legarda | NPC | 2 | 2019 | Majority | Malabon |
| Bongbong Marcos | Nacionalista | 1 | 2016 | Majority | Batac, Ilocos Norte |
| Serge Osmeña | Independent | 1 | 2016 | Majority | Makati |
| Koko Pimentel | PDP–Laban | 1 | 2019 | Majority | Cagayan de Oro |
| Grace Poe | Independent | 1 | 2016 | Majority | San Juan |
| Juan Ponce Enrile (Note: Juan Ponce Enrile was detained on July 3, 2014, on plunder charges related to the Priority Development Assistance Fund scam.) | PMP | 2 | 2016 | Minority | Aparri, Cagayan |
| Ralph Recto | Liberal | 1 | 2016 | Majority | Lipa, Batangas |
| Bong Revilla (Note: Bong Revilla was detained on June 20, 2014, on plunder charges related to the Priority Development Assistance Fund scam.) | Lakas | 2 | 2016 | Minority | Imus, Cavite |
| Tito Sotto | NPC | 1 | 2016 | Minority | Quezon City |
| Antonio Trillanes | Nacionalista | 2 | 2019 | Majority | Caloocan |
| Cynthia Villar | Nacionalista | 1 | 2019 | Majority | Las Piñas |

==== Current composition ====
Per party
| Party | Majority | Minority | Total | % |
|---|---|---|---|---|
| Nacionalista | 5 | 0 | 5 | 21% |
| UNA | 0 | 5 | 5 | 21% |
| Liberal | 4 | 0 | 4 | 17% |
| NPC | 1 | 1 | 2 | 8% |
| Lakas | 1 | 0 | 1 | 4% |
| LDP | 1 | 0 | 1 | 4% |
| PDP–Laban | 1 | 0 | 1 | 4% |
| PRP | 1 | 0 | 1 | 4% |
| Independent | 4 | 0 | 4 | 16% |
| Total | 18 | 6 | 24 | 100% |

Per bloc
| Bloc | Total | % |
|---|---|---|
| Majority | 18 | 75% |
| Minority | 6 | 25% |
| Total | 24 | 100% |

==== Composition history ====
| Date | Event | Party(Majority/minority bloc/independent) (Shading indicates party has members in the majority bloc) | | | | | | | | | Total | |
| Date | Event | LDP | Lakas | LP | NP | NPC | PDP | PRP | UNA | Ind | Total | Vacant |
|---|---|---|---|---|---|---|---|---|---|---|---|---|
| End of 15th Congress | | 1 / 0 | 2 / 1 | 4 / 0 | 2 / 3 | 2 / 0 | 2 / 0 | 1 / 0 | 3 / 0 | 2 / 0 | 23 | 1 |
| Election result | | 1 | 2 | 4 | 5 | 2 | 1 | 1 | 5 | 3 | 24 | 0 |
| July 22, 2013 | Senate presidential election | 1 / 0 | 2 / 0 | 4 / 0 | 5 / 0 | 1 / 1 | 1 / 0 | 0/0/1 | 0 / 5 | 3 / 0 | 24 | 0 |
| July 23, 2013 | Santiago accepted into the majority | 1 / 0 | 2 / 0 | 4 / 0 | 5 / 0 | 1 / 1 | 1 / 0 | 1 / 0 | 0 / 5 | 3 / 0 | 24 | 0 |

=== House of Representatives ===
The term of office of the members of the House of Representatives will be from June 30, 2013, to June 30, 2016.

Sixteenth Congress representation map of the Philippines

| Province/City | District | Representative | Party | Term | Bloc |
|---|---|---|---|---|---|
| Abra | Lone | Joy Bernos | NUP (Note: Affiliated with the Liberal Party at election.) | 2 | Majority |
| Agusan del Norte | 1st | Lawrence Fortun | Liberal | 1 | Majority |
| Agusan del Norte | 2nd | Erlpe John Amante | Nacionalista (Note: Affiliated with Kusug Agusanon at election.) | 1 | Majority |
| Agusan del Sur | 1st | Maria Valentina Plaza | NUP | 2 | Majority |
| Agusan del Sur | 2nd | Evelyn Plaza-Mellana | NUP | 2 | Majority |
| Aklan | Lone | Teodorico Haresco Jr. | Nacionalista (Note: Independent at election.) | 2 | Majority |
| Albay | 1st | Edcel Greco Lagman | Liberal | 1 | Majority |
| Albay | 2nd | Al Francis Bichara | Nacionalista | 3 | Majority |
| Albay | 3rd | Fernando Gonzalez | Liberal | 2 | Majority |
| Antipolo | 1st | Roberto Puno | NUP | 3 | Majority |
| Antipolo | 2nd | Romeo Acop | Liberal | 2 | Majority |
| Antique | Lone | Paolo Everardo Javier | Liberal | 2 | Majority |
| Apayao | Lone | Eleanor Begtang | NPC | 2 | Majority |
| Aurora | Lone | Bella Angara | LDP | 1 | Minority |
| Bacolod | Lone | Evelio Leonardia | NPC | 1 | Majority |
| Baguio | Lone | Nicasio Aliping Jr. | Liberal | 1 | Majority |
| Basilan | Lone | Hadjiman Hataman Salliman | Liberal | 2 | Majority |
| Bataan | 1st | Herminia Roman | Liberal | 3 | Majority |
| Bataan | 2nd | Tet Garcia (Note: Tet Garcia died on June 13, 2016.) | NUP | 1 | Majority |
| Batanes | Lone | Henedina Abad | Liberal | 2 | Majority |
| Batangas | 1st | Eileen Ermita-Buhain | Nacionalista (Note: Affiliated with Lakas–CMD at election.) | 1 | Majority |
| Batangas | 2nd | Raneo Abu | Nacionalista | 1 | Majority |
| Batangas | 3rd | Sonny Collantes | Liberal | 2 | Majority |
| Batangas | 4th | Mark Llandro Mendoza | NPC | 3 | Majority |
| Benguet | Lone | Ronald Cosalan | Liberal | 2 | Majority |
| Biliran | Lone | Rogelio Espina | Liberal | 2 | Majority |
| Bohol | 1st | Rene Relampagos | Liberal | 2 | Majority |
| Bohol | 2nd | Aris Aumentado | NPC | 1 | Majority |
| Bohol | 3rd | Arthur C. Yap | NPC | 1 | Majority |
| Bukidnon | 1st | Maria Lourdes Acosta-Alba | Liberal | 1 | Majority |
| Bukidnon | 2nd | Florencio Flores Jr. | Nacionalista | 2 | Minority |
| Bukidnon | 3rd | Jose Zubiri III | BPP | 3 | Majority |
| Bukidnon | 4th | Rogelio Neil Roque | NPC | 1 | Majority |
| Bulacan | 1st | Victoria Sy-Alvarado | Liberal (Note: Affiliated with the National Unity Party at election.) | 3 | Majority |
| Bulacan | 2nd | Gavini Pancho | NUP | 1 | Independent minority |
| Bulacan | 3rd | Jonjon Mendoza | Liberal | 2 | Majority |
| Bulacan | 4th | Linabelle Villarica | Liberal | 2 | Majority |
| Cagayan | 1st | Sally Ponce Enrile | NPC | 1 | Majority |
| Cagayan | 2nd | Baby Alfonso | NUP | 2 | Majority |
| Cagayan | 3rd | Randolph Ting | NUP | 2 | Majority |
| Cagayan de Oro | 1st | Rolando Uy | Liberal | 1 | Majority |
| Cagayan de Oro | 2nd | Rufus Rodriguez | CDP | 3 | Majority |
| Caloocan | 1st | Enrico Echiverri | NPC | 1 | Majority |
| Caloocan | 2nd | Edgar Erice | Liberal | 1 | Majority |
| Camarines Norte | 1st | Cathy Barcelona-Reyes | Liberal | 1 | Majority |
| Camarines Norte | 2nd | Elmer Panotes (Note: Elmer Panotes died on September 16, 2015.) | Lakas | 2 | Majority |
| Camarines Sur | 1st | Rolando Andaya Jr. | NPC | 2 | Majority |
| Camarines Sur | 2nd | Dato Arroyo | NPC | 3 | Independent minority |
| Camarines Sur | 3rd | Leni Robredo | Liberal | 1 | Majority |
| Camarines Sur | 4th | Felix William Fuentebella | NPC | 1 | Majority |
| Camarines Sur | 5th | Salvio Fortuno | Liberal | 2 | Majority |
| Camiguin | Lone | Xavier Jesus Romualdo | Liberal (Note: Affiliated with the Nationalist People's Coalition at election.) | 1 | Majority |
| Capiz | 1st | Antonio del Rosario | Liberal | 3 | Majority |
| Capiz | 2nd | Fredenil Castro | NUP | 1 | Majority |
| Catanduanes | Lone | Cesar Sarmiento | Liberal | 2 | Majority |
| Cavite | 1st | Francis Gerald Abaya | Liberal | 1 | Majority |
| Cavite | 2nd | Lani Mercado | Lakas | 2 | Independent minority |
| Cavite | 3rd | Alex Advincula | Liberal | 1 | Majority |
| Cavite | 4th | Elpidio Barzaga Jr. | NUP | 3 | Majority |
| Cavite | 5th | Roy Loyola | Liberal | 2 | Majority |
| Cavite | 6th | Luis Ferrer IV | NUP | 1 | Independent minority |
| Cavite | 7th | Abraham Tolentino | Liberal | 1 | Majority |
| Cebu | 1st | Samsam Gullas | Nacionalista | 1 | Majority |
| Cebu | 2nd | Wilfredo Caminero | Liberal | 1 | Majority |
| Cebu | 3rd | Gwendolyn Garcia | UNA | 1 | Majority |
| Cebu | 4th | Benhur Salimbangon | NUP | 2 | Majority |
| Cebu | 5th | Ace Durano | NPC | 1 | Majority |
| Cebu | 6th | Luigi Quisumbing | Liberal | 2 | Majority |
| Cebu City | 1st | Raul del Mar | Liberal | 1 | Majority |
| Cebu City | 2nd | Rodrigo Abellanosa | Liberal | 1 | Majority |
| Compostela Valley | 1st | Maria Carmen Zamora | Liberal | 2 | Majority |
| Compostela Valley | 2nd | Rommel Amatong | Aksyon | 3 | Majority |
| Cotabato | 1st | Jesus Sacdalan | Liberal | 2 | Majority |
| Cotabato | 2nd | Nancy Catamco | Liberal | 2 | Majority |
| Cotabato | 3rd | Jose Tejada | Liberal | 1 | Minority |
| Davao City | 1st | Karlo Nograles | NUP | 2 | Majority |
| Davao City | 2nd | Mylene Garcia-Albano | Liberal | 2 | Majority |
| Davao City | 3rd | Isidro Ungab | PDP–Laban | 3 | Majority |
| Davao del Norte | 1st | Antonio Rafael del Rosario | Liberal | 2 | Majority |
| Davao del Norte | 2nd | Antonio Lagdameo Jr. | NUP | 3 | Majority |
| Davao del Sur | 1st | Mercedes Cagas | Nacionalista | 1 | Majority |
| Davao del Sur | 2nd | Franklin Bautista | Liberal | 3 | Majority |
| Davao Oriental | 1st | Nelson Dayanghirang Sr. | Liberal (Note: Affiliated with the Nacionalista Party at election.) | 3 | Majority |
| Davao Oriental | 2nd | Thelma Almario | NPC | 3 | Majority |
| Dinagat Islands | Lone | Kaka Bag-ao | Liberal | 2 | Majority |
| Eastern Samar | Lone | Ben Evardone | Liberal | 2 | Majority |
| Guimaras | Lone | JC Rahman Nava | Liberal | 3 | Majority |
| Ifugao | Lone | Teddy Baguilat | Liberal | 2 | Majority |
| Iligan | Lone | Vicente Belmonte Jr. | Liberal | 3 | Majority |
| Ilocos Norte | 1st | Rodolfo Fariñas | Liberal | 2 | Majority |
| Ilocos Norte | 2nd | Imelda Marcos | Nacionalista (Note: Affiliated with Kilusang Bagong Lipunan at election.) | 2 | Independent minority |
| Ilocos Sur | 1st | Ronald Singson | Nacionalista | 3 | Majority |
| Ilocos Sur | 2nd | Eric Singson | Liberal | 1 | Majority |
| Iloilo | 1st | Richard Garin | Liberal | 1 | Majority |
| Iloilo | 2nd | Arcadio Gorriceta | Liberal | 1 | Majority |
| Iloilo | 3rd | Arthur Defensor Jr. | Liberal | 2 | Majority |
| Iloilo | 4th | Hernan Biron Jr. | NUP (Note: Affiliated with the United Nationalist Alliance at election.) | 1 | Majority |
| Iloilo | 5th | Niel Tupas Jr. | Liberal | 3 | Majority |
| Iloilo City | Lone | Jerry Treñas | Liberal | 2 | Majority |
| Isabela | 1st | Rodolfo Albano III | Nacionalista | 1 | Minority |
| Isabela | 2nd | Anna Cristina Go | Liberal | 2 | Minority |
| Isabela | 3rd | Napoleon Dy | NPC | 2 | Majority |
| Isabela | 4th | Giorgidi Aggabao | NPC | 3 | Majority |
| Kalinga | Lone | Manuel Agyao | Liberal | 3 | Majority |
| La Union | 1st | Victor Ortega | Liberal | 3 | Independent minority |
| La Union | 2nd | Eufranio Eriguel | NPC | 2 | Majority |
| Laguna | 1st | Dan Fernandez | Liberal | 3 | Majority |
| Laguna | 2nd | Jun Chipeco | Liberal | 1 | Majority |
| Laguna | 3rd | Sol Aragones | UNA | 1 | Majority |
| Laguna | 4th | Benjamin Agarao Jr. | Liberal | 1 | Majority |
| Lanao del Norte | 1st | Imelda Dimaporo | Liberal | 2 | Independent minority |
| Lanao del Norte | 2nd | Abdullah D. Dimaporo | NPC | 1 | Independent minority |
| Lanao del Sur | 1st | Ansaruddin Alonto Adiong | Liberal | 1 | Majority |
| Lanao del Sur | 2nd | Pangalian Balindong | Independent | 3 | Majority |
| Lapu-Lapu City | Lone | Aileen Radaza | Liberal | 1 | Majority |
| Las Piñas | Lone | Mark Villar | Nacionalista | 2 | Majority |
| Leyte | 1st | Martin Romualdez | Lakas | 3 | Independent minority |
| Leyte | 2nd | Sergio Apostol | Liberal | 2 | Majority |
| Leyte | 3rd | Andres Salvacion Jr. | Liberal | 3 | Majority |
| Leyte | 4th | Lucy Torres-Gomez | Liberal | 1 | Majority |
| Leyte | 5th | Jose Carlos Cari | Liberal | 2 | Majority |
| Maguindanao | 1st | Bai Sandra Sema | Liberal | 2 | Majority |
| Maguindanao | 2nd | Zajid Mangudadatu | Liberal | 1 | Majority |
| Makati | 1st | Monique Lagdameo | UNA | 2 | Majority |
| Makati | 2nd | Abigail Binay | UNA | 3 | Majority |
| Malabon | Lone | Josephine Lacson-Noel | NPC | 3 | Majority |
| Mandaluyong | Lone | Neptali Gonzales II | Liberal | 3 | Majority |
| Manila | 1st | Benjamin Asilo | Liberal | 3 | Majority |
| Manila | 2nd | Carlo Lopez | Liberal | 2 | Majority |
| Manila | 3rd | Zenaida Angping | NPC | 3 | Majority |
| Manila | 4th | Trisha Bonoan-David | NUP | 3 | Majority |
| Manila | 5th | Amado Bagatsing | KABAKA | 3 | Majority |
| Manila | 6th | Rosenda Ann Ocampo | Liberal | 2 | Majority |
| Marikina | 1st | Marcelino Teodoro | NPC | 3 | Majority |
| Marikina | 2nd | Miro Quimbo | Liberal | 2 | Majority |
| Marinduque | Lone | Regina Reyes Mandanas (Note: Regina Reyes Mandanas was removed on January 12, 2016, after an electoral protest.) | Liberal | 1 | Majority |
| Marinduque | Lone | Lord Allan Velasco (Note: Lord Allan Velasco took office on February 1, 2016, after winning an electoral protest against Regina Reyes Mandanas.) | NUP | 0 | Majority |
| Masbate | 1st | Maria Vida Espinosa-Bravo | NUP | 1 | Majority |
| Masbate | 2nd | Olga Kho | Nacionalista | 1 | Majority |
| Masbate | 3rd | Scott Davies Lanete | NPC | 2 | Majority |
| Misamis Occidental | 1st | Jorge Almonte | Liberal | 2 | Majority |
| Misamis Occidental | 2nd | Henry Oaminal | Nacionalista | 1 | Majority |
| Misamis Oriental | 1st | Peter Unabia | Liberal | 2 | Majority |
| Misamis Oriental | 2nd | Juliette Uy | NUP | 1 | Independent minority |
| Mountain Province | Lone | Maximo Dalog | Liberal | 2 | Majority |
| Muntinlupa | Lone | Rodolfo Biazon | Liberal | 2 | Majority |
| Navotas | Lone | Toby Tiangco | UNA | 2 | Independent |
| Negros Occidental | 1st | Jules Ledesma | NPC | 3 | Majority |
| Negros Occidental | 2nd | Leo Rafael Cueva | NUP | 1 | Independent minority |
| Negros Occidental | 3rd | Albee Benitez | Independent | 2 | Majority |
| Negros Occidental | 4th | Jeffrey Ferrer | NUP (Note: Affiliated with the United Negros Alliance at election.) | 3 | Majority |
| Negros Occidental | 5th | Alejandro Mirasol | Liberal | 2 | Majority |
| Negros Occidental | 6th | Mercedes Alvarez | NPC | 2 | Majority |
| Negros Oriental | 1st | Manuel Iway | Liberal | 1 | Majority |
| Negros Oriental | 2nd | George Arnaiz | NPC | 3 | Majority |
| Negros Oriental | 3rd | Pryde Henry Teves | NPC | 3 | Majority |
| Northern Samar | 1st | Harlin Abayon (Note: Harlin Abayon was removed by the House of Representatives Electoral Tribunal on February 3, 2016, after an electoral protest. Abayon was reinstated by the Supreme Court on May 3, 2016, but his reinstatement was not implemented.) | Nacionalista | 1 | Majority |
| Northern Samar | 1st | Raul Daza (Note: Raul Daza took office on May 23, 2016, after winning an electoral protest against Harlin Abayon.) | Liberal | 0 | Majority |
| Northern Samar | 2nd | Emil Ong | NUP | 3 | Majority |
| Nueva Ecija | 1st | Estrellita Suansing | Liberal (Note: Affiliated with Unang Sigaw at election.) | 1 | Majority |
| Nueva Ecija | 2nd | Joseph Gilbert Violago | Liberal | 3 | Majority |
| Nueva Ecija | 3rd | Czarina Umali | Liberal | 3 | Majority |
| Nueva Ecija | 4th | Magnolia Antonino-Nadres | UNA | 1 | Majority |
| Nueva Vizcaya | Lone | Carlos Padilla | Nacionalista | 3 | Majority |
| Occidental Mindoro | Lone | Josephine Sato | Liberal | 1 | Majority |
| Oriental Mindoro | 1st | Paulino Salvador Leachon | Liberal | 1 | Majority |
| Oriental Mindoro | 2nd | Reynaldo Umali | Liberal | 2 | Majority |
| Palawan | 1st | Franz Alvarez | NUP | 1 | Majority |
| Palawan | 2nd | Frederick Abueg | Liberal (Note: Affiliated with Partidong Pagbabago ng Palawan at election.) | 1 | Majority |
| Palawan | 3rd | Douglas Hagedorn | Liberal | 1 | Majority |
| Pampanga | 1st | Yeng Guiao | Liberal (Note: Affiliated with Kambilan at election.) | 1 | Majority |
| Pampanga | 2nd | Gloria Macapagal Arroyo | Lakas | 2 | Independent minority |
| Pampanga | 3rd | Oscar Samson Rodriguez | Liberal | 1 | Majority |
| Pampanga | 4th | Juan Pablo Bondoc | Nacionalista | 1 | Majority |
| Pangasinan | 1st | Jesus Celeste | NPC | 2 | Majority |
| Pangasinan | 2nd | Leopoldo Bataoil | Liberal | 2 | Majority |
| Pangasinan | 3rd | Rose Marie Arenas | Liberal | 1 | Majority |
| Pangasinan | 4th | Gina de Venecia | NPC | 2 | Majority |
| Pangasinan | 5th | Carmen Cojuangco | NPC | 2 | Majority |
| Pangasinan | 6th | Marlyn Primicias-Agabas | NPC | 2 | Majority |
| Parañaque | 1st | Eric Olivarez | Liberal | 1 | Majority |
| Parañaque | 2nd | Gustavo Tambunting | UNA | 1 | Majority |
| Pasay | Lone | Imelda Calixto-Rubiano | Liberal | 2 | Majority |
| Pasig | Lone | Roman Romulo | Independent | 3 | Majority |
| Quezon | 1st | Mark Enverga | NPC | 3 | Majority |
| Quezon | 2nd | Vicente Alcala | Liberal | 1 | Majority |
| Quezon | 3rd | Aleta Suarez | UNA | 1 | Independent minority |
| Quezon | 4th | Angelina Tan | NPC | 1 | Majority |
| Quezon City | 1st | Francisco Calalay | Liberal | 1 | Majority |
| Quezon City | 2nd | Winston Castelo | Liberal | 2 | Majority |
| Quezon City | 3rd | Jorge Banal Jr. | Liberal | 2 | Majority |
| Quezon City | 4th | Feliciano Belmonte Jr. | Liberal | 2 | Majority |
| Quezon City | 5th | Alfred Vargas | Liberal | 1 | Majority |
| Quezon City | 6th | Kit Belmonte | Liberal | 1 | Majority |
| Quirino | Lone | Dakila Cua | Liberal | 2 | Majority |
| Rizal | 1st | Joel Duavit | NPC | 2 | Majority |
| Rizal | 2nd | Isidro Rodriguez Jr. | NPC | 2 | Majority |
| Romblon | Lone | Eleandro Jesus Madrona | Nacionalista | 3 | Majority |
| Samar | 1st | Mel Senen Sarmiento (Note: Mel Senen Sarmiento resigned on September 12, 2015, upon appointment as Secretary of the Interior and Local Government.) | Liberal | 2 | Majority |
| Samar | 2nd | Milagrosa Tan | NPC | 2 | Majority |
| San Jose del Monte | Lone | Arthur Robes | Liberal | 3 | Majority |
| San Juan | Lone | Ronaldo Zamora | Nacionalista (Note: Affiliated with Partido Magdiwang at election.) | 1 | Minority |
| Sarangani | Lone | Manny Pacquiao | UNA | 1 | Majority |
| Siquijor | Lone | Marie Anne Pernes | Liberal | 1 | Majority |
| Sorsogon | 1st | Evelina Escudero | NPC | 1 | Majority |
| Sorsogon | 2nd | Deogracias Ramos Jr. | Liberal | 2 | Majority |
| South Cotabato | 1st | Pedro Acharon Jr. | NPC | 2 | Majority |
| South Cotabato | 2nd | Dinand Hernandez | NPC | 1 | Majority |
| Southern Leyte | Lone | Damian Mercado | Liberal | 1 | Majority |
| Sultan Kudarat | 1st | Raden Sakaluran | PTM | 2 | Majority |
| Sultan Kudarat | 2nd | Arnulfo Go | NUP | 3 | Majority |
| Sulu | 1st | Tupay Loong | Liberal | 2 | Majority |
| Sulu | 2nd | Maryam Arbison | Liberal | 1 | Majority |
| Surigao del Norte | 1st | Francisco Matugas | Liberal | 3 | Majority |
| Surigao del Norte | 2nd | Guillermo Romarate Jr. | Nacionalista | 3 | Majority |
| Surigao del Sur | 1st | Philip Pichay (Note: Philip Pichay was removed by the Supreme Court on January 26, 2016, after an electoral protest.) | Lakas | 3 | Independent minority |
| Surigao del Sur | 1st | Mary Elizabeth Ty-Delgado (Note: Mary Elizabeth Ty-Delgado took office on May 23, 2016, after winning an electoral protest against Philip Pichay.) | Liberal | 0 | Majority |
| Surigao del Sur | 2nd | Florencio Garay | NPC | 3 | Majority |
| Taguig–Pateros | 1st | Arnel Cerafica | Liberal | 2 | Majority |
| Taguig | 2nd | Lino Cayetano | Nacionalista | 1 | Minority |
| Tarlac | 1st | Henry Cojuangco (Note: Henry Cojuangco died on May 12, 2015.) | NPC | 2 | Majority |
| Tarlac | 2nd | Susan Yap | NPC | 2 | Majority |
| Tarlac | 3rd | Noel Villanueva | NPC | 1 | Majority |
| Tawi-Tawi | Lone | Ruby Sahali | Liberal | 1 | Majority |
| Valenzuela | 1st | Win Gatchalian | NPC | 1 | Majority |
| Valenzuela | 2nd | Magi Gunigundo | Liberal | 3 | Majority |
| Zambales | 1st | Jeffrey Khonghun | Liberal | 1 | Majority |
| Zambales | 2nd | Cheryl Deloso-Montalla | Liberal | 1 | Majority |
| Zamboanga City | 1st | Celso Lobregat | LDP | 1 | Majority |
| Zamboanga City | 2nd | Lilia Macrohon-Nuño | Nacionalista | 1 | Majority |
| Zamboanga del Norte | 1st | Bullet Jalosjos | Nacionalista | 2 | Minority |
| Zamboanga del Norte | 2nd | Rosendo Labadlabad | Liberal | 3 | Majority |
| Zamboanga del Norte | 3rd | Isagani Amatong | Liberal | 1 | Majority |
| Zamboanga del Sur | 1st | Victor Yu | NPC | 3 | Majority |
| Zamboanga del Sur | 2nd | Aurora E. Cerilles | NPC | 2 | Majority |
| Zamboanga Sibugay | 1st | Belma Cabilao | Nacionalista | 1 | Majority |
| Zamboanga Sibugay | 2nd | Dulce Ann Hofer | Liberal | 1 | Majority |
| Party-list | | Silvestre Bello III | 1-BAP | 1 | Minority |
| Party-list | | Edgardo Masongsong | 1-CARE | 1 | Majority |
| Party-list | | Michael Angelo Rivera | 1-CARE | 2 | Majority |
| Party-list | | Erlinda Santiago | 1-SAGIP | 1 | Majority |
| Party-list | | Mariano Piamonte Jr. | A Teacher | 3 | Majority |
| Party-list | | Julieta Cortuna | A Teacher | 2 | Majority |
| Party-list | | Sharon Garin | AAMBIS-Owa | 2 | Majority |
| Party-list | | Jonathan dela Cruz | Abakada | 1 | Independent minority |
| Party-list | | Maximo Rodriguez Jr. | Abamin | 2 | Majority |
| Party-list | | Joseph Stephen Paduano | Abang Lingkod | 1 | Majority |
| Party-list | | Conrado Estrella III | Abono | 1 | Majority |
| Party-list | | Francisco Ortega III | Abono | 2 | Majority |
| Party-list | | Catalina Leonen-Pizarro | ABS | 2 | Majority |
| Party-list | | Antonio Tinio | ACT Teachers | 2 | Minority |
| Party-list | | Samuel Pagdilao | ACT-CIS | 1 | Majority |
| Party-list | | Nicanor Briones | AGAP | 3 | Majority |
| Party-list | | Rico Geron | AGAP | 1 | Majority |
| Party-list | | Patricio Antonio | Agbiag | 2 | Majority |
| Party-list | | Delphine Gan Lee | AGRI | 1 | Majority |
| Party-list | | Christopher Co | AKB | 2 | Majority |
| Party-list | | Rodel Batocabe | AKB | 2 | Majority |
| Party-list | | Walden Bello (Note: Walden Bello resigned on March 19, 2015.) | Akbayan | 2 | Majority |
| Party-list | | Barry Gutierrez | Akbayan | 1 | Majority |
| Party-list | | Angelina Katoh (Note: Angelina Katoh took office on May 13, 2015, to succeed Walden Bello.) | Akbayan | 0 | Majority |
| Party-list | | Wes Gatchalian | Alay Buhay | 2 | Majority |
| Party-list | | Lorna Velasco | AMA | 1 | Majority |
| Party-list | | Sitti Djalia Hataman | AMIN | 1 | Majority |
| Party-list | | Neil Benedict Montejo | An Waray | 2 | Majority |
| Party-list | | Victoria Isabel Noel (Note: Victoria Isabel Noel took office as An Waray's second representative despite the party-list winning only one seat.) | An Waray | 1 | Majority |
| Party-list | | Jose Panganiban Jr. | ANAC-IP | 1 | Majority |
| Party-list | | Fernando Hicap | Anakpawis | 1 | Minority |
| Party-list | | Leah Paquiz | Ang Nars | 1 | Minority |
| Party-list | | Jesulito Manalo | Angkla | 1 | Majority |
| Party-list | | Pablo Nava III | Append | 1 | Majority |
| Party-list | | Roberto Mascariña (Note: Roberto Mascariña took office on May 23, 2016.) | Ating Koop | 0 | — |
| Party-list | | Eulogio Magsaysay | AVE | 2 | Majority |
| Party-list | | Neri Colmenares | Bayan Muna | 2 | Minority |
| Party-list | | Carlos Isagani Zarate | Bayan Muna | 1 | Minority |
| Party-list | | Mike Velarde Jr. | Buhay | 3 | Majority |
| Party-list | | Lito Atienza | Buhay | 1 | Independent minority |
| Party-list | | Irwin Tieng | Buhay | 3 | Majority |
| Party-list | | Agapito Guanlao | Butil | 2 | Majority |
| Party-list | | Sherwin Tugna | CIBAC | 2 | Majority |
| Party-list | | Cinchona Cruz-Gonzales | CIBAC | 3 | Majority |
| Party-list | | Cresente Paez | Coop-NATCCO | 2 | Majority |
| Party-list | | Antonio Bravo | Coop-NATCCO | 1 | Majority |
| Party-list | | Emmeline Aglipay-Villar | DIWA | 2 | Majority |
| Party-list | | Luzviminda Ilagan | Gabriela | 3 | Minority |
| Party-list | | Emmi de Jesus | Gabriela | 2 | Minority |
| Party-list | | Terry Ridon | Kabataan | 1 | Minority |
| Party-list | | Abigail Faye Ferriol | Kalinga | 2 | Majority |
| Party-list | | Arnel Ty | LPGMA | 2 | Minority |
| Party-list | | Gary Alejano | Magdalo | 1 | Majority |
| Party-list | | Francisco Ashley Acedillo | Magdalo | 1 | Majority |
| Party-list | | Roy Señeres (Note: Roy Señeres died on February 8, 2016.) | OFW Family | 1 | Majority |
| Party-list | | Johnny Revilla | OFW Family | 1 | Majority |
| Party-list | | Vacant (Note: The Senior Citizens Partylist won two seats in the 2013 elections, but their seats were left vacant as the party-list submitted two lists of nominees.) | Senior Citizens | — | — |
| Party-list | | Vacant | Senior Citizens | — | — |
| Party-list | | Raymond Mendoza (Note: Raymond Mendoza took office on July 30, 2013.) | TUCP | 0 | Majority |
| Party-list | | Carol Jane Lopez | YACAP | 3 | Minority |

==== Current composition ====
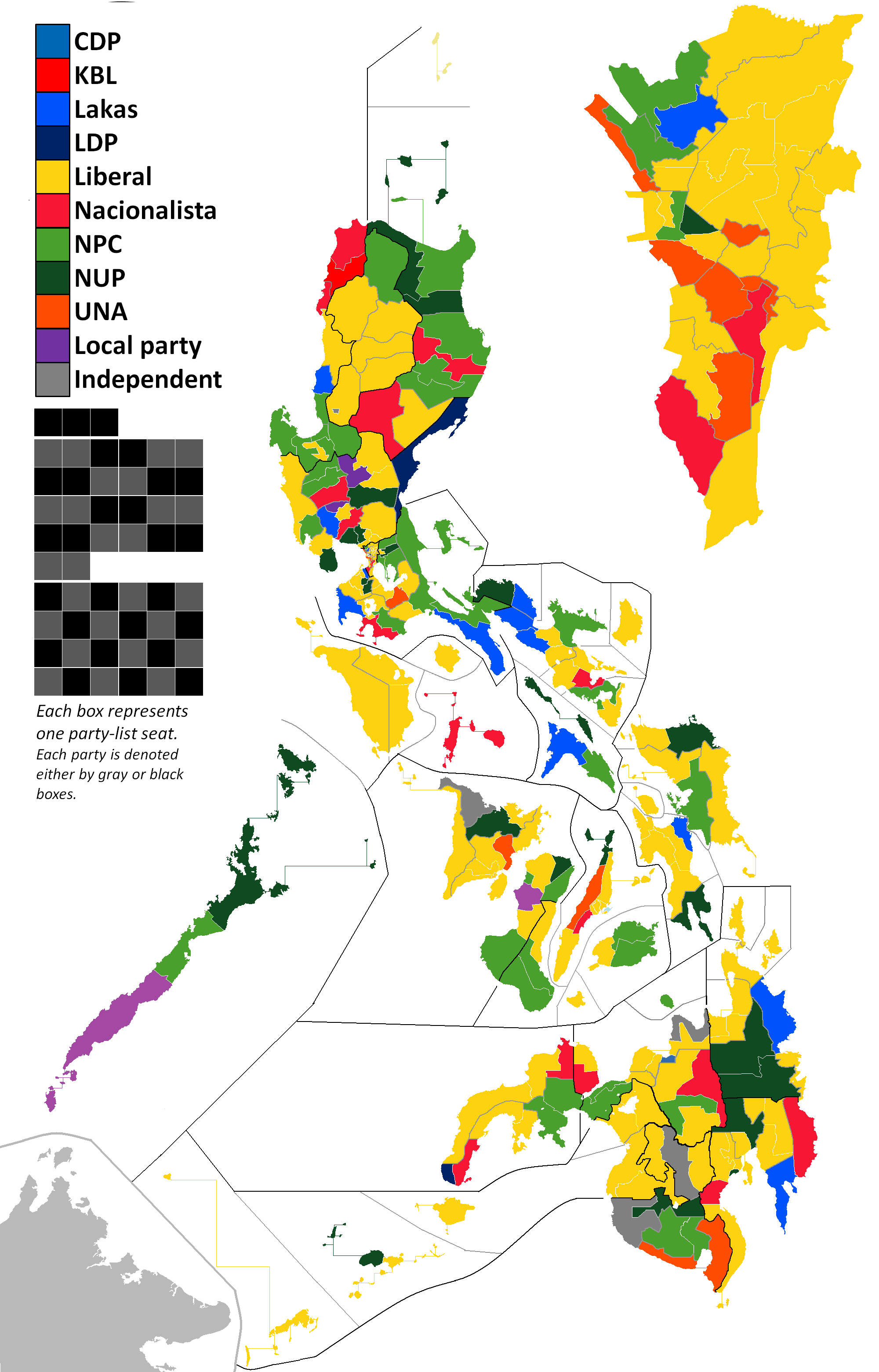
Current party standing. Party list seats are denoted by black and gray boxes to the left; Metro Manila seats are magnified on the inset at the right.

Per party
| Party | Majority | Ind. & Ind. minority | Minority | None | Total | % |
|---|---|---|---|---|---|---|
| Liberal | 110 | 0 | 0 | 0 | 110 | 37.7% |
| NPC | 35 | 2 | 1 | 0 | 38 | 13.0% |
| NUP | 24 | 3 | 0 | 0 | 27 | 9.2% |
| Nacionalista | 16 | 0 | 5 | 0 | 21 | 7.2% |
| Lakas | 6 | 7 | 0 | 1 | 14 | 4.8% |
| UNA | 7 | 1 | 0 | 0 | 8 | 2.7% |
| Buhay | 2 | 1 | 0 | 0 | 3 | 1.0% |
| 1-CARE | 2 | 0 | 0 | 0 | 2 | 0.7% |
| A TEACHER | 2 | 0 | 0 | 0 | 2 | 0.7% |
| Abono | 2 | 0 | 0 | 0 | 2 | 0.7% |
| AGAP | 2 | 0 | 0 | 0 | 2 | 0.7% |
| AKB | 2 | 0 | 0 | 0 | 2 | 0.7% |
| Akbayan | 2 | 0 | 0 | 0 | 2 | 0.7% |
| An Waray | 2 | 0 | 0 | 0 | 2 | 0.7% |
| Bayan Muna | 0 | 0 | 2 | 0 | 2 | 0.7% |
| CIBAC | 2 | 0 | 0 | 0 | 2 | 0.7% |
| Coop-NATCCO | 2 | 0 | 0 | 0 | 2 | 0.7% |
| GABRIELA | 0 | 0 | 2 | 0 | 2 | 0.7% |
| LDP | 1 | 0 | 1 | 0 | 2 | 0.7% |
| Magdalo | 2 | 0 | 0 | 0 | 2 | 0.7% |
| OFW Family | 2 | 0 | 0 | 0 | 2 | 0.7% |
| 1-BAP | 0 | 0 | 1 | 0 | 1 | 0.3% |
| 1-SAGIP | 1 | 0 | 0 | 0 | 1 | 0.3% |
| AAMBIS-Owa | 1 | 0 | 0 | 0 | 1 | 0.3% |
| Abakada Guro | 0 | 1 | 0 | 0 | 1 | 0.3% |
| ABAMIN | 1 | 0 | 0 | 0 | 1 | 0.3% |
| Abang Lingkod | 1 | 0 | 0 | 0 | 1 | 0.3% |
| ABS | 1 | 0 | 0 | 0 | 1 | 0.3% |
| ACT-CIS | 1 | 0 | 0 | 0 | 1 | 0.3% |
| ACT Teachers | 0 | 0 | 1 | 0 | 1 | 0.3% |
| Agbiag | 1 | 0 | 0 | 0 | 1 | 0.3% |
| Agri | 1 | 0 | 0 | 0 | 1 | 0.3% |
| Alay Buhay | 1 | 0 | 0 | 0 | 1 | 0.3% |
| AMA | 1 | 0 | 0 | 0 | 1 | 0.3% |
| ANAC-IP | 1 | 0 | 0 | 0 | 1 | 0.3% |
| Anakpawis | 0 | 0 | 1 | 0 | 1 | 0.3% |
| Anak Mindanao | 1 | 0 | 0 | 0 | 1 | 0.3% |
| ANGKLA | 1 | 0 | 0 | 0 | 1 | 0.3% |
| Ang Nars | 0 | 0 | 1 | 0 | 1 | 0.3% |
| Append | 1 | 0 | 0 | 0 | 1 | 0.3% |
| AVE | 1 | 0 | 0 | 0 | 1 | 0.3% |
| Bukidnon Paglaum (caucuses with Liberals) | 1 | 0 | 0 | 0 | 1 | 0.3% |
| Butil | 1 | 0 | 0 | 0 | 1 | 0.3% |
| CDP | 1 | 0 | 0 | 0 | 1 | 0.3% |
| DIWA | 1 | 0 | 0 | 0 | 1 | 0.3% |
| KABAKA (caucuses with UNA) | 1 | 0 | 0 | 0 | 1 | 0.3% |
| Kabataan | 0 | 0 | 1 | 0 | 1 | 0.3% |
| KALINGA | 1 | 0 | 0 | 0 | 1 | 0.3% |
| Kambilan | 1 | 0 | 0 | 0 | 1 | 0.3% |
| KBL | 0 | 1 | 0 | 0 | 1 | 0.3% |
| Kusug Agusanon (caucuses with Liberals) | 1 | 0 | 0 | 0 | 1 | 0.3% |
| LPGMA | 0 | 0 | 1 | 0 | 1 | 0.3% |
| Magdiwang (caucuses with UNA) | 0 | 0 | 1 | 0 | 1 | 0.3% |
| PPPL | 1 | 0 | 0 | 0 | 1 | 0.3% |
| TUCP | 1 | 0 | 0 | 0 | 1 | 0.3% |
| Unang Sigaw | 1 | 0 | 0 | 0 | 1 | 0.3% |
| United Negros Alliance (caucuses with NUP) | 1 | 0 | 0 | 0 | 1 | 0.3% |
| YACAP | 0 | 0 | 1 | 0 | 1 | 0.3% |
| Independent | 3 | 1 | 0 | 0 | 4 | 1.4% |
| Totals | 253 | 17 | 19 | 1 | 290 | 99.3% |

Per bloc
| Bloc | Total | % |
|---|---|---|
| Majority | 253 | 86.6% |
| Minority | 19 | 6.5% |
| Independent minority (including 1 independent) | 17 | 5.8% |
| None | 1 | 0.3% |
| Vacancies | 2 | 0.7% |
| Total | 292 | 100% |

Note: Representatives who voted for Romualdez in the speakership election are denoted as "independent minority". One representative who abstained in the speakership election is denoted as an "independent" and is included in the "independent minority" bloc for purposes of classification.

==== Composition history ====
- Shading indicates party has members in the majority bloc; italicization indicates party has members in the Minority bloc.

| Date | Event | Party(Majority/minority bloc/unclassified) (Shading indicates party has members in the majority bloc) | | | | | | | | | | Total | |
| Date | Event | Lakas | LP | NP | NPC | NUP | UNA | Other | Local | Ind | PL | Total | Vacant |
|---|---|---|---|---|---|---|---|---|---|---|---|---|---|
| End of 15th Congress | | 28 | 91 | 16 | 43 | 27 | 11 | 4 | 1 | 4 | 56 | 281 | 6 |
| Election result | | 14 | 112 | 18 | 42 | 24 | 10 | 4 | 4 | 6 | 54 | 288 | 4 |
| July 2, 2013 | Macrohon-Nuño (independent) joins the Nacionalista Party | 14 | 112 | 19 | 42 | 24 | 10 | 4 | 4 | 5 | 54 | 288 | 4 |
| July 22, 2013 | Speakership election | 7/0/7 | 109/1/2 | 16/4/0 | 32/1/5 | 22/0/4 | 8/1/1 | 2/1/1 | 4/0/0 | 3/0/1 | 41/11/2 | 288 | 4 |
| July 24, 2013 | Duavit accepted into the majority | 7/0/7 | 110/1/2 | 15/4/0 | 33/1/4 | 22/0/4 | 8/1/1 | 2/1/1 | 4/0/0 | 3/0/1 | 41/11/2 | 288 | 4 |
| July 29, 2013 | Biazon accepted into the majority | 7/0/7 | 111/1/1 | 15/4/0 | 33/1/4 | 22/0/4 | 8/1/1 | 2/1/1 | 4/0/0 | 3/0/1 | 41/11/2 | 288 | 4 |
| July 31, 2013 | Dy, Ocampo accepted into the majority; R.D. Mendoza sworn in | 7/0/7 | 112/1 | 15/4/0 | 34/1/3 | 22/0/4 | 8/1/1 | 2/1/1 | 4/0/0 | 3/0/1 | 41/11/3 | 289 | 3 |
| August 8, 2013 | R.D. Mendoza accepted into the majority | 7/0/7 | 112/1 | 15/4/0 | 36/1/1 | 22/0/4 | 8/1/1 | 2/1/1 | 4/0/0 | 3/0/1 | 42/11/2 | 289 | 3 |
| May 28, 2014 | Paduano sworn in | 7/0/7 | 112/1 | 15/4/0 | 36/1/1 | 22/0/4 | 8/1/1 | 2/1/1 | 4/0/0 | 3/0/1 | 42/11/3 | 290 | 2 |
| May 29, 2014 | Paduano accepted into the majority | 7/0/7 | 112/1 | 15/4/0 | 36/1/1 | 22/0/4 | 8/1/1 | 2/1/1 | 4/0/0 | 3/0/1 | 43/11/2 | 290 | 2 |
| March 16, 2015 | W. Bello's resignation | 7/0/7 | 112/1 | 15/4/0 | 36/1/1 | 22/0/4 | 8/1/1 | 2/1/1 | 4/0/0 | 3/0/1 | 42/11/2 | 289 | 3 |
| May 12, 2015 | E. Cojuangco's death | 7/0/7 | 112/1 | 15/4/0 | 35/1/1 | 22/0/4 | 8/1/1 | 2/1/1 | 4/0/0 | 3/0/1 | 42/11/2 | 288 | 4 |
| May 13, 2015 | Katoh sworn in | 7/0/7 | 112/1 | 15/4/0 | 35/1/1 | 22/0/4 | 8/1/1 | 2/1/1 | 4/0/0 | 3/0/1 | 42/11/3 | 289 | 3 |
| May 19, 2015 | Katoh accepted into the majority | 7/0/7 | 112/1 | 15/4/0 | 35/1/1 | 22/0/4 | 8/1/1 | 2/1/1 | 4/0/0 | 3/0/1 | 43/11/2 | 289 | 3 |
| September 16, 2015 | Panotes's death | 6/0/7 | 112/1 | 15/4/0 | 35/1/1 | 22/0/4 | 8/1/1 | 2/1/1 | 4/0/0 | 3/0/1 | 42/11/3 | 288 | 4 |
| September 29, 2015 | M.S. Sarmiento's swearing in as Secretary of the Interior and Local Government | 6/0/7 | 111/1 | 15/4/0 | 35/1/1 | 22/0/4 | 8/1/1 | 2/1/1 | 4/0/0 | 3/0/1 | 42/11/3 | 287 | 5 |

- In this tally, congressmen who voted for Romualdez are unclassified.

== Committees ==
=== Constitutional bodies ===
| Committee | Senate | | House of Representatives | | | |
| Committee | Chairman | Minority leader | Chairman | District | Minority leader | District |
|---|---|---|---|---|---|---|
| Commission on Appointments | Franklin Drilon | Vicente Sotto III | Antonio del Rosario* | Capiz–1st | Rodolfo Albano III | Isabela–1st |
| Electoral tribunals | Bam Aquino | Nancy Binay | Franklin Bautista | Davao del Sur–2nd | Luzviminda Ilagan | Party-list |
| Judicial and Bar Council | Aquilino Pimentel III | —N/a | Niel Tupas, Jr. | Iloilo–5th | —N/a | |

*Replacement for resigned member Mel Senen Sarmiento (Liberal; Samar–1st)

== Legislation ==
Laws passed by the 16th Congress:
