= Maximo Rodriguez Jr. =

Filipino politician (born 1958)

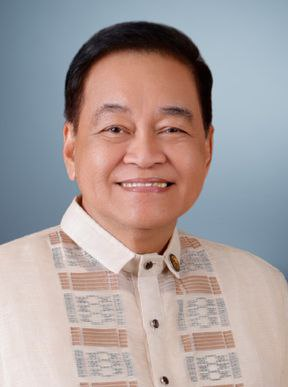
- Official portrait, 2025

Member of Philippine House of Representatives
- Incumbent
- Assumed office June 30, 2025
- In office June 30, 2010 – June 30, 2016
- Constituency: Party-list (Abante Mindanao)
- In office June 30, 2016 – June 30, 2019
- Preceded by: Rufus Rodriguez
- Succeeded by: Rufus Rodriguez
- Constituency: Cagayan de Oro's 2nd district
House positions
Chair of the House East ASEAN Growth Area Special Committee
Incumbent
Assumed office August 6, 2025
| Preceded by | Rihan Sakaluran |
Chair of the House Mindanao Affairs Committee
In office August 9, 2016 – June 30, 2019
| Preceded by | Arnulfo Go |
| Succeeded by | Mohamad Khalid Dimaporo |

Personal details
- Born: Maximo Bautista Rodriguez Jr. January 9, 1958 (age 68) Cagayan de Oro, Misamis Oriental, Philippines
- Party: Abante Mindanao (party-list; 2010–present)
- Other political affiliations: PDP–Laban (2016–2019); Independent (2015–2016)
- Relations: Rufus Rodriguez (brother)
- Nickname: Maxie

Maximo Bautista Rodriguez Jr. (born January 9, 1958) is a Filipino politician serving as the representative for the Abante Mindanao party-list in the Philippine House of Representatives since 2025, having previously held the same position from 2010 to 2016. He also represented Cagayan de Oro's 2nd congressional district from 2016 to 2019.

== Early life ==
Rodriguez was born on January 9, 1958, in Cagayan de Oro, Misamis Oriental, to Maximo G. Rodriguez Sr. and Martha Bautista.

== Political career ==
=== House of Representatives ===
==== Party-list representative (2010–2016) ====
The Abante Mindanao party-list was registered with the Commission on Elections in the 2010 House elections, with Rodriguez as its first nominee. The party-list won one seat. He served another term in 2013 elections after Abante Mindanao with him as first nominee gained again one seat.

==== Cagayan de Oro's 2nd district representative (2016–2019) ====
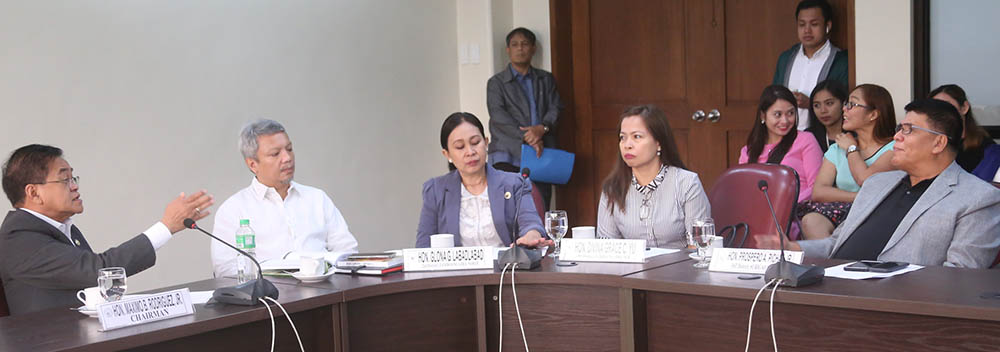
Maximo Rodriguez Jr. (leftmost) chairs a hearing of the House Mindanao Affairs Committee on July 24, 2018.

In 2016, Rodriguez's elder brother, Rufus, the incumbent representative of Cagayan de Oro's 2nd congressional district, was term-limited and ran for the city's mayoralty. Rodriguez successfully ran for the district seat as an independent candidate and joined the ruling party PDP–Laban at the start of the 17th Congress. He was elected chairperson of the House Committee on Mindanao Affairs on August 9, 2016.

==== Party-list representative (2025–present) ====
After Abante Mindanao failed to win a seat in 2019 and was delisted in the 2022 elections, the party-list once again gained representation in the House in 2025, placing 37th and winning a single seat. Rodriguez, as the party's first nominee, was elected to serve a fourth term in Congress. He currently serves as chairperson of the House Special Committee on the East ASEAN Growth Area, to which he was elected on August 6, 2025. He has frequently co-authored bills with his brother Rufus.

During the 20th Congress, Rodriguez refiled his 2018 House Bill No. 681 as House Bill No. 4772, seeking to create a trust fund for child stars by requiring movie and television producers to deposit their talent fees and earnings into it.

Rodriguez voted in favor of Vice President Sara Duterte's second impeachment on May 11, 2026.

== Personal life ==
Rodriguez is married to Mary Grace Rodriguez. He is the younger brother of representative Rufus Rodriguez.

== Electoral history ==
Electoral history of Maximo Rodriguez Jr.
| Year | Office | Party | Votes received | | | | Result |
| Year | Office | Party | Total | % | P. | Swing | Result |
|---|---|---|---|---|---|---|---|
| 2010 | Representative (Party-list) | Abante Mindanao | 378,345 | 1.26% | 19th | —N/a | Won |
| 2013 | Representative (Party-list) | Abante Mindanao | 466,114 | 1.68% | 16th | +0.42 | Won |
| 2025 | Representative (Party-list) | Abante Mindanao | 320,349 | 0.81% | 37th | -0.87 | Won |
| 2016 | Representative (Cagayan de Oro–2nd) | Independent | 46,363 | 40.05% | 1st | —N/a | Won |

House of Representatives of the Philippines
| Preceded by None (party out of Congress) | Member for Abante Mindanao; June 30, 2025 – present (June 30, 2010 – June 30, 2016) | Incumbent |
| New political party | Member for Abante Mindanao; June 30, 2025 – present (June 30, 2010 – June 30, 2016) | Succeeded by None (party out of Congress) |
| Preceded by Rufus Rodriguez | Member for Cagayan de Oro's 2nd district June 30, 2016 – June 30, 2019 | Succeeded by Rufus Rodriguez |
