= 2025 Iligan local elections =

Local election in the Philippines

- May 12, 2025
- Registered: 189,050
- Turnout: 158,396
- Mayoral election
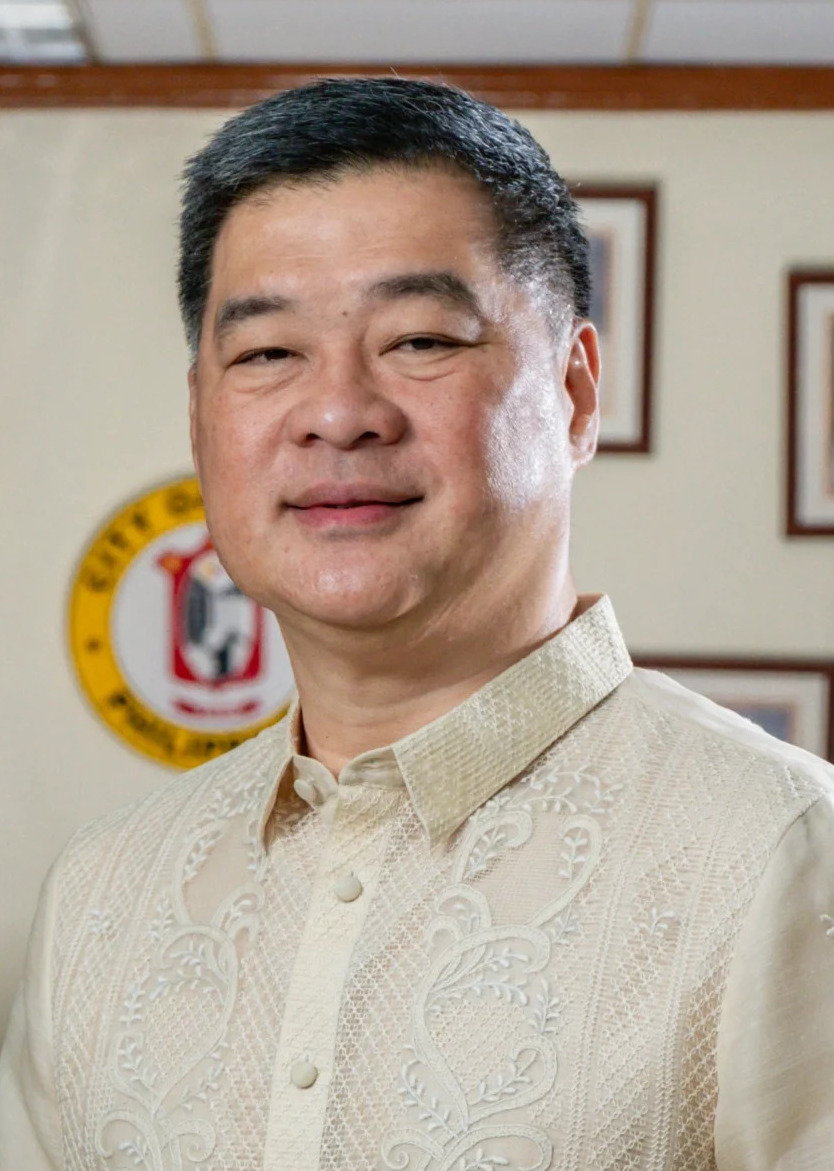
		PMP
Candidate	Frederick Siao	Leony Roy Ga
Party	Nacionalista	PMP
Running mate	Marianito Alemania	Ernest Oliver Uy
Popular vote	73,095	66,894
Percentage	46.15%	42.23%
	IND	NUP
Candidate	Franklin Quijano	Rolando Anduyan
Party	Independent	NUP
Running mate	Jemar Vera Cruz	Andres Visaya Jr.
Popular vote	10,283	4,097
Percentage	6.49%	2.59%
Mayor before election
Frederick Siao
Nacionalista
Elected mayor
Frederick Siao
Nacionalista

Local elections were held in Iligan on May 12, 2025, as part of the 2025 Philippine general election. The electorate elected a mayor, a vice mayor, twelve members of the Iligan City Council, and one district representative to the House of Representatives of the Philippines. The officials elected will assume their respective offices on June 30, 2025, for a three-year-long term.

- Electorate (2025): 189,050
- Turnout (2025): 158,396 (83.79%)

== Mayoral election ==
Incumbent mayor Frederick Siao reelected for his second consecutive term.

2025 Iligan City Mayoral Election
Party	Candidate	Votes	%
Nacionalista	Frederick Siao	73,095	46.15
PMP	Leony Roy Ga	66,894	42.23
Independent	Franklin Quijano	10,283	6.49
NUP	Rolando Anduyan	4,097	2.59
Valid ballots		154,378	97.46
Invalid or blank votes		4,018	2.54
Total votes		158,396	100.00

== Vice mayoral election ==
Businessman Ernest Oliver Uy unseated incumbent Marianito Alemania.

2025 Iligan City vice mayoral Election
Party	Candidate	Votes	%
PMP	Ernest Oliver Uy	70,306	44.39
Nacionalista	Marianito Alemania	65,976	41.65
PDP–Laban	Jemar Vera Cruz	13,175	8.32
NUP	Andres Visaya Jr.	1,699	1.07
Valid ballots		151,165	95.43
Invalid or blank votes		7,231	4.57
Total votes		158,396	100.00

== Congressional election ==
Incumbent Celso Regencia also reelected for his second consecutive term.

2025 Philippine House of Representatives election in Iligan City
Party	Candidate	Votes	%
Lakas	Celso Regencia	73,535	46.42
Nacionalista	Oscar Badelles	57,728	36.45
NUP	Graciano Mijares	11,343	7.16
PDP–Laban	Emmanuel Salibay	5,697	3.60
Independent	Seigred Joseph Espina	740	0.47
Valid ballots		149,043	94.10
Invalid or blank votes		9,353	5.90
Total votes		158,396	100.00

== City council election ==
Below is the complete list of candidates. Parties are as stated in their certificates of candidacy.

2025 Iligan City Council Elections
Party	Candidate	Votes	%
PMP	Nhicolle Capangpangan	73,120	46.16
Nacionalista	Thomas Derrick Siao	68,002	42.93
Nacionalista	Providencio Abragan Jr.	67,869	42.85
Nacionalista	Bernard Pacaña	66,272	41.84
Nacionalista	Michelle Echavez Sweet	65,970	41.65
Nacionalista	Marlene Young	65,840	41.57
Nacionalista	Samuel Huertas	65,307	41.23
Nacionalista	Vincenro King Belmonte	64,135	40.49
PMP	Ian Chua Uy	62,590	39.51
PMP	Randy Lasmarias Ong	62,202	39.27
Nacionalista	Ramil Emborong	61,931	39.10
NPC	Simplicio Larrazabal III	60,695	38.32
PMP	Lamberto Macapagal Jr.	60,193	38.00
PMP	Veronico Echavez	59,406	37.50
PMP	Demosthenes Plando	58,139	36.70
PMP	Holden Ian Loking	57,749	36.46
Nacionalista	Melvin Anggot	57,643	36.39
PMP	Grecita Catubig	57,315	36.18
Nacionalista	Maria Paz Teresa Zalsos-Uychiat	56,867	35.90
PMP	Dexter Rey Sumaoy	55,364	34.95
PMP	Giovanni Encabo	54,642	34.50
Nacionalista	Irvine Sumagang	52,898	33.40
PMP	Amador Baller	52,892	33.39
PMP	Richard Gomez-Yap Veloso	48,509	30.63
PDP–Laban	Sorilie Christine Bacsarpa	17,524	11.06
PDP–Laban	Voltaire Rovira II	16,486	10.41
NUP	Rudolph Charles Tamula	14,414	9.10
PDP–Laban	Ariel Barry Magallanes	13,759	8.69
Independent	Rex Lao Razo	13,141	8.30
NUP	Teodoro Gayo Jr.	12,262	7.74
NUP	Philamer Sabarre	9,165	5.79
PDP–Laban	Dominic Carillo	8,664	5.47
PDP–Laban	Michael Hussein Macarambon	8,383	5.29
PDP–Laban	Randy Salcedo	7,727	4.88
NUP	Leopoldo Ricarte Jr.	7,645	4.83
PDP–Laban	Valeriano Murillo Jr.	6,795	4.29
PDP–Laban	Jonathan Maeslim	5,392	3.40
NUP	Alberto Ong Jr.	5,336	3.37
NUP	Allysah Pangandaman	5,074	3.20
NUP	Alfredo Nuena Obina Jr.	4,998	3.16
NUP	Kirk Troy Fernan	3,990	2.52
NUP	Lilibeth Imperial	2,905	1.83
Independent	Julie Olazo Lao	2,681	1.69
Independent	Kenneth Austria	2,636	1.66
Independent	Scott Summer Destura	2,203	1.39
Independent	Jun Marmay Biston	1,201	0.76
Independent	Izwyn Giban Marin	1,143	0.72
Valid ballots		135,958	85.83
Invalid or blank votes		22,438	14.17
Total votes		158,396	100.00

== Tickets ==
=== Asenso Iliganon Party 2025 ===
Asenso Iliganon Party 2025
#	Position	Party
For Mayor
4	Frederick Siao	Nacionalista
For Vice Mayor
1	Marianito Alemania	Nacionalista
For House of Representatives (Lone District)
1	Oscar Badelles	Nacionalista
For City Council
1	Providencio Abragan Jr.	Nacionalista
2	Melvin Anggot	Nacionalista
7	King Belmonte	Nacionalista
13	Ramil Emborong	Nacionalista
17	Samuel Huertas	Nacionalista
20	Simplicio Larrazabal III	NPC
31	Bernard Pacaña	Nacionalista
39	Derrick Siao	Nacionalista
40	Irvine Sumagang	Nacionalista
43	Michelle Echavez Sweet-Booc	Nacionalista
47	Marlene Young	Nacionalista
48	Maria Paz Teresa Zalsos-Uychiat	Nacionalista

=== United Iligan Party 2025 ===
United Iligan Party 2025
#	Position	Party
For Mayor
2	Roy Ga	PMP
For Vice Mayor
2	Wekwek Uy	PMP
For House of Representatives (Lone District)
4	Celso Regencia	Lakas
For City Council
6	Amador "Dongki" Baller	PMP
9	Nhicolle Capangpangan	PMP
11	Grace Catubig	PMP
12	Veronico Echavez	PMP
14	Atty. Vanni Encabo	PMP
21	Ian Loking	PMP
22	Macky Macapagal	PMP
30	Ryan Rhandy Ong	PMP
33	Demosthenes Plando	PMP
41	Dexter Sumaoy	PMP
45	Ian Uy	PMP
46	Richard Veloso	PMP

=== Abante Iligan ===
Abante Iligan
#	Position	Party
For Vice Mayor
3	Jemar Monsi Vera Cruz	PDP
For House of Representatives (Lone District)
3	General Buboy Mijares	NUP
For City Council
4	Ate Sol Bacsarpa	PDP
10	Dominic Tesdaman Carillo	PDP
23	Michael Maglinte Macarambon	PDP
24	Jonathan Magaro Maeslim	PDP
25	Bong Magallanes	PDP
27	Pastor Val Murillo	PDP
36	Voltaire Rovira II	PDP
38	Randy Salcedo	PDP

=== Kargador 2025 ===
Kargador 2025
#	Position	Party
For Mayor
1	Rolando Anduyan	NUP
For City Council
15	Troy Arias Fernan	NUP
16	Teodoro Gayo Jr.	NUP
28	Alfredo Nuena Obina Jr.	NUP
31	Allysah Pangandaman	NUP
35	Leo Padilla Ricarte	NUP
44	Rudolph Charles Tamula	NUP

=== Barug Iligan Movement 2025 ===
Barug Iligan Movement 2025
#	Position	Party
For Vice Mayor
1	Andres Visaya Jr.	NUP
For City Council
15	Pastor Philamer Sabarre	NUP
16	Lilibeth Imperial	NUP
28	Albert Iglupas Ong Jr.	NUP
