= 2019 Iligan local elections =

Philippine election

Iligan City Mayoral Elections, 2019
- May 13, 2019
- Turnout: 72.55%
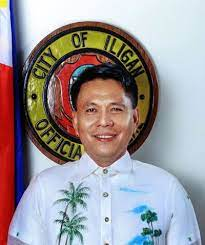

Nominee	Celso Regencia	Marianito Alemania	Thomas Dean Quijano
Party	PDP–Laban	Nacionalista	One Iligan
Running mate	Jemar Vera Cruz	Samuel Huertas	Ma. Paz Theresa Zalsos-Uychiat
Popular vote	74,835	47,720	6,335
Percentage	56.04	35.74	4.74
Nominee	Manuel Battung Jr.
Party	Independent
Running mate	none
Popular vote	431
Percentage	0.32
Mayor before election
Celso Regencia
NPC
Elected mayor
Celso Regencia
PDP–Laban

Local elections held in Iligan City last May 13, 2019 as part of the Philippine general election. Registered voters elected officials for the local posts in the city: the mayor, vice mayor, the one congressman, and twelve councilors. At the end of filing of certificates of candidacy (COC) last October 2018, a total of 54 hopefuls have filed their COC for city's 15 elective positions: 4 are running for congressman, 4 for mayor, 3 for vice-mayor, and 13 for city councilors.

On May 14, 2019, the incumbent mayor, vice-mayor, and congressman were declared winners by the city board of canvassers at the session hall of the Sangguniang Panlungsod. There were 184,058 eligible voters in the city for this election, and there were 133,537 votes cast, giving a voter turnout of 72.55%.

== Lone District Representative ==
Frederick Siao (NP) is the incumbent. He was reelected for his second term as district representative.

2018 Philippine House of Representatives election in Iligan City
Party	Candidate	Votes	%
Nacionalista	Frederick Siao	64,354	48.19%
PDP–Laban	Leony Roy Ga	61,480	46.04%
PFP	James Aldeguer	727	0.54%
Invalid or blank votes		6,976	5.22%
Total votes		133,537	100.00%
Nacionalista gain from PDP–Laban			

== Mayor ==
Celso Regencia (PDP-Laban) is the incumbent. Regencia won via landslide against businessman Marianito Alemania (NP) and reelected for his 3rd and final term as city mayor.

Iligan City Mayoral Election
Party	Candidate	Votes	%
PDP–Laban	Celso Regencia	74,835	56.04%
Nacionalista	Marianito Alemania	47,720	35.74%
One Iligan	Thomas Dean Quijano	6,335	4.74%
Independent	Manuel Battung Jr.	431	0.32%
Invalid or blank votes		4,216	3.16%
Total votes		133,537	100.00
PDP–Laban gain from Nacionalista			

== Vice Mayor ==
Jemar Vera-Cruz (PDP-Laban) is the incumbent and reelected for his second term as vice-mayor.

Iligan City Vice Mayoral Election
Party	Candidate	Votes	%
PDP–Laban	Jemar Vera Cruz	62,132	46.53%
Nacionalista	Samuel Huertas	55,176	41.32%
One Iligan	Ma. Paz Theresa Zalsos-Uychiat	7,990	5.98%
Invalid or blank votes		8,239	6.17%
Total votes		133,537	100.00%
PDP–Laban gain from Nacionalista			

== City Councilors ==
Below is the result of election for city councilors. Parties are stated on their certificate of candidacies. A total of 41 hopefuls ran for 12 city assemblymen posts.

Iligan City City Councilor Election
Party	Candidate	Votes	%
PDP–Laban	Rhandy Ryan Francis Ong	58,982	44.17%
PDP–Laban	Ian Uy	57,929	43.38%
PDP–Laban	Lamberto Macapagal Jr.	57,724	43.23%
PDP–Laban	Jessie Balanay	56,915	42.62%
Nacionalista	Providencio Abragan Jr.	56,360	42.21%
Nacionalista	Rosevi Queenie Belmonte	56,039	41.97%
PDP–Laban	Rudolph Charles Tamula	56,010	41.94%
PDP–Laban	Sorilie Christine Bacsarpa	55,375	41.47%
PDP–Laban	Petronilo Pardillo	54,563	40.86%
PDP–Laban	Demosthenes Plando	53,641	40.17%
Nacionalista	Michelle Echavez-Sweet	53,430	40.01%
UNA	Simplicio Larrazabal III	52,946	39.65%
PDP–Laban	Bernard Pacaña	51,195	38.34%
PDP–Laban	Belinda Lim	51,490	38.56%
PDP–Laban	Renato Ancis	47,985	35.93%
PDP–Laban	Rafael Benedictos Jr.	47,650	35.68%
Nacionalista	Veronico Echavez	43,810	32.81%
Nacionalista	Winefredo Niez	43,704	32.73%
Nacionalista	Alfredo Busico	43,387	32.49%
Independent	Mariza Go-Minaga	39,357	29.47%
Nacionalista	Philamer Sabarre	37,330	27.95%
Nacionalista	Jules Verne Padilla	36,729	27.50%
Nacionalista	Glenn Villacin	35,268	26.41%
Nacionalista	Arturo Alibanggo	34,932	26.16%
Independent	Amador Baller	27,987	20.96%
Independent	Ruderic Marzo	23,972	17.95%
PFP	Eric Capitan	20,777	15.56%
One Iligan	Edsel Cabaluna	20,436	15.30%
Independent	Chonilo Ruiz	13,004	9.74%
Independent	Jeffrey Rebleza	12,903	9.66%
Independent	Moises Dalisay Jr.	12,616	9.45%
Independent	Damian Ruiz Jr.	7,195	5.39%
Independent	Samson Dajao	6,796	5.09%
Independent	Roel Quidlat	4,015	3.01%
One Iligan	Emz Barriaga	3,719	2.78%
PDP–Laban	Elmer Marcella	3,661	2.74%
Independent	Asterio Mercarsos	3,556	2.66%
One Iligan	Tingting Maminta	3,477	2.60%
One Iligan	Tata Genon	2,984	2.23%
Independent	Elizer Escalona	2,239	1.68%
Independent	Joan delos Santos Tabinas	1,881	1.41%
Total votes		133,537	100.00%
