= Iligan's at-large congressional district =

Congressional district in Iligan

- Constituency for the House of Representatives of the Philippines
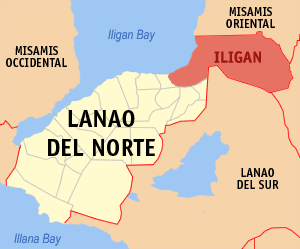
- Map of Lanao del Norte showing the location of Iligan.
- City: Iligan
- Region: Northern Mindanao
- Population: 363,115 (2020)
- Electorate: 189,050 (2025)
- Major settlements: Iligan
- Area: 813.37 km^{2} (314.04 sq mi)

Current constituency
- Created: 1984
- Representative: Celso Regencia
- Political party: Lakas
- Congressional bloc: Majority

Iligan's at-large congressional district is the congressional district of the Philippines in Iligan. It has been represented in the House of Representatives of the Philippines since 2010, and in the Batasang Pambansa in 1984 to 1986. Previously included in Lanao del Norte's 1st congressional district from 1987 to 2010,Region XII from 1978 to 1984, and in Lanao del Norte's at-large congressional district prior to 1978, it includes all barangays of the city. It is currently represented in the 20th Congress by Celso Regencia of the Lakas-CMD (Lakas).

== Representation history ==
#	Image	Member	Term of office		Parliament	Party	Electoral history
#	Image	Member	Start	End	Parliament	Party	Electoral history
=== Iligan's at-large district for the Regular Batasang Pambansa ===
District created February 1, 1984 from Region XII's at-large district.
1		Camilo Cabili	July 23, 1984	March 25, 1986	2nd	KBL	Elected in 1984
District dissolved into Lanao del Norte's 1st district.
#	Image	Member	Term of office		Congress	Party	Electoral history
#	Image	Member	Start	End	Congress	Party	Electoral history
=== Iligan's at-large district for the House of Representatives of the Philippines ===
District re-created October 20, 2009.
2		Vicente Belmonte Jr.	June 30, 2010	June 30, 2016	15th	Liberal	Redistricted from Lanao del Norte's 1st district and re-elected in 2010.
2		Vicente Belmonte Jr.	June 30, 2010	June 30, 2016	16th	Liberal	Re-elected in 2013.
3		Frederick Siao	June 30, 2016	June 30, 2022	17th	UNA	Elected in 2016.
3		Frederick Siao	June 30, 2016	June 30, 2022	18th	Nacionalista	Re-elected in 2019.
4		Celso Regencia	June 30, 2022	Incumbent	19th	PDP	Elected in 2022.
4		Celso Regencia	June 30, 2022	Incumbent	20th	Lakas	Re-elected in 2025.

== Election results ==
=== 2025 ===
Candidate	Party	Votes	%
Celso Regencia (incumbent)	Lakas–CMD	74,818	49.34
Oscar Badelles	Nacionalista Party	58,895	38.84
Graciano Mijares	National Unity Party	11,447	7.55
Emmanuel Salibay	Independent	5,747	3.79
Seigred Espina	Independent	745	0.49
Total		151,652	100.00
Valid votes		151,652	94.12
Invalid/blank votes		9,481	5.88
Total votes		161,133	100.00
Registered voters/turnout		189,050	85.23
Lakas–CMD hold			
Source: Commission on Elections

=== 2010 ===
Philippine House of Representatives election at Iligan
Party	Candidate	Votes	%
Liberal	Vicente Belmonte, Jr.	86,786	92.20
Independent	Samson Dajao	4,550	4.83
PMP	Jose Pantoja	2,789	2.96
Valid ballots		94,125	95.03
Invalid or blank votes		4,926	4.97
Total votes		99,051	100.00
Liberal win (new seat)			

=== 2013 ===
2013 Philippine House of Representatives election in Iligan
Party	Candidate	Votes	%
Liberal	Vicente Belmonte, Jr.	59,591	73.83
PMP	Uriel Borja	10,196	12.63
Independent	Samson Dajao	9,034	11.19
NUP	Jose Noel Arquiza	1,138	1.41
Independent	Joe Booc	566	0.70
Independent	Alberto Ora	185	0.23
Total votes		89,083	100.00
Liberal hold			

=== 2016 ===
2016 Philippine House of Representatives election in Iligan City
Party	Candidate	Votes	%
UNA	Frederick Siao	34,222	29.93%
NPC	Alipio Cirilo Badelles	26,267	22.97%
Liberal	Lawrence Lluch-Cruz	21,521	18.82%
CDP	Vermin Quimco	13,662	11.94%
PDP–Laban	Franklin Quijano	13,540	11.84%
Independent	Melchora Ambalong	2,378	2.07%
Independent	Uriel Borja	1,993	1.74%
Independent	Samson Dajao	381	0.33%
Independent	Luis Carrillo	363	0.31%
Total votes		124,915	100%
UNA gain from Liberal			

=== 2019 ===
2019 Philippine House of Representatives election in Iligan City
Party	Candidate	Votes	%
Nacionalista	Frederick Siao	64,354	50.84%
PDP–Laban	Roy Ga	61,480	48.57%
PFP	James Aldeguer	727	0.57%
Valid ballots		126,561	94.78
Invalid or blank votes		6946	5.22
Total votes		133,537	100.00
Nacionalista hold			

== See also ==
- Legislative district of Iligan
