= Centrist Democratic Youth Association of the Philippines =

Filipino youth political association

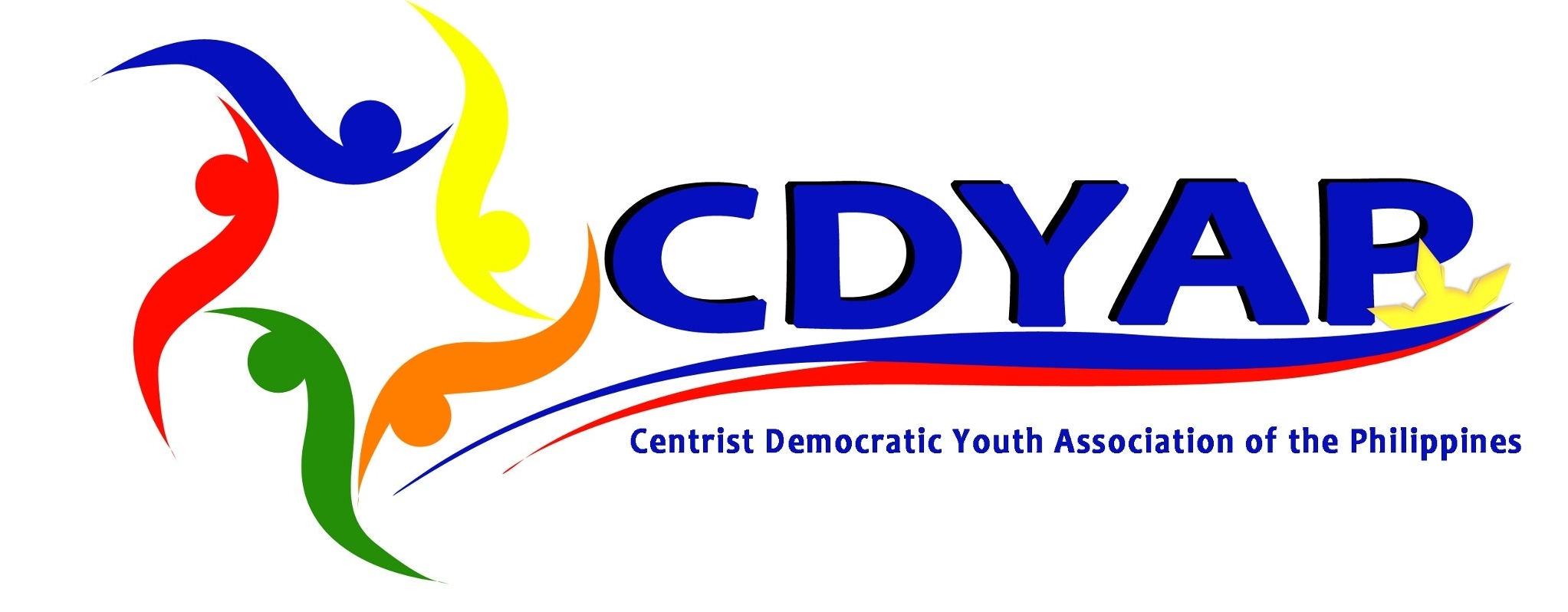
- Chairperson: Cristita Marie Laude Giangan
- Founded: September 8, 2012
- Ideology: Christian democracy Federalism
- Mother party: Centrist Democratic Party of the Philippines
- Website: cdyap.weebly.com

The Centrist Democratic Youth Association of the Philippines (CDYAP) is a centrist democratic youth political association closely linked with the Centrist Democratic Party of the Philippines. It believes in the core values of Human Dignity, Empowerment, Socio-Political Maturity and Integrity. It also believes in non-obstructive political engagement and participation of young people and seeks to dismantle the politics of apathy amongst the youth.

== History ==
The CDYAP was established in three different regions from July to August 2012 in the National Capital Region, Cebu and Davao. From those established regions, regional officers were elected.

After setting up the first three regional assemblies, on September 8, 2012, the National Founding Council of the CDYAP was established under the leadership of former Gilbert Teodoro Spokesperson Aaron Benedict De Leon as its National Chairperson and Cristita Marie Giangan as Secretary-General. The composition of the National Founding Council were representatives from Manila, Cebu, Davao and Northern Mindanao.

== Structure ==
The CDYAP has presence in 11 out of 17 regions in the Philippines, with 3 Established Regions with at least 3 Districts in the National Capital Region, Northern Mindanao Region and the Autonomous Region for Muslim Mindanao.

== Activities and Projects ==
The CDYAP was especially active in the 2013 Elections as it launched several Political Education campaigns aimed at ensuring a clean, honest and free elections. Because of this advocacy, it forged a partnership with AAGAPAY Youth to form the Kabataang Kumikilos para sa Bayan (KKB) Coalition. It also was the main support association of the Centrist Democratic Party's candidates also in the said elections.

The CDYAP continues to do fund-raising and innovative projects, promote policies that adhere to the well-being of the youth sector and establish programs that directly serve the needs of the youth constituency even after elections.
