= Rufus Rodriguez =

Filipino lawyer and politician (born 1953)

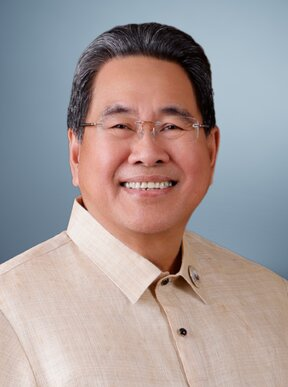
- Official portrait, 2025

Deputy Speaker of the House of Representatives of the Philippines
- In office November 18, 2020 – June 1, 2022
- Speaker: Lord Allan Velasco

Member of the House of Representatives from Cagayan de Oro's 2nd district
- Incumbent
- Assumed office June 30, 2019
- Preceded by: Maxie Rodriguez
- In office June 30, 2007 – June 30, 2016
- Preceded by: District established
- Succeeded by: Maxie Rodriguez

Commissioner of the Bureau of Immigration
- In office July 1, 1998 – January 20, 2001
- Appointed by: Joseph Estrada
- Preceded by: Edgar Mendoza
- Succeeded by: Andrea D. Domingo

Vice Governor of Misamis Oriental
- In office 1984–1986
- Governor: Fernando Pacana Jr.

Member of the Misamis Oriental Provincial Board
- In office 1980–1984

Personal details
- Born: Rufus Bautista Rodriguez; September 13, 1953 (age 73) Cagayan de Oro, Misamis Oriental, Philippines
- Party: CDP (2010–present)
- Other political affiliations: PMP (2007–2010); Independent (1992–2007); NPC (1992)
- Spouse: Fenina T. Rodriguez
- Education: De La Salle University (BA); University of the Philippines Diliman (LL.B); Xavier University – Ateneo de Cagayan (MEcon); Columbia University (LL.M)

Rufus Bautista Rodriguez (born September 13, 1953) is a Filipino lawyer and politician. He is the president of the Centrist Democratic Party and has been a member of the House of Representatives representing the Cagayan de Oro's 2nd district since 2019, a position he previously held from 2007 to 2016. He previously served as Vice Governor of Misamis Oriental from 1984 to 1986 and Board Member from 1980 to 1984. Rodriguez also was appointed as the head of the Bureau of Immigration by President Joseph Estrada in 1998 and served in that capacity until 2001.

== Education ==
During his high school graduation, Rodriguez was the recipient of the Insular Life Excellence Award.

He graduated from De La Salle University in 1975 with a Bachelor of Arts in Economics. He then earned his Bachelor of Laws degree in the University of the Philippines Diliman. As a sophomore law student, he was elected the first and first-Filipino president of the World Association of Law Students based in Washington, D.C. As such he presided over the organization’s assemblies in Khartoum, Madrid, and São Paulo. During his time as a law student at U.P., he became the youngest author of law books in his junior year by writing the Law on Transportation published by Rex Bookstore. He also became a member of the Order of the Purple Feather Honor Society from 1st to 4th year. After graduation he then passed the 1981 bar examinations with grades of 90% in three bar subjects, namely Commercial Law, Criminal Law and Labor Law.

He then studied in Xavier University – Ateneo de Cagayan and earned a Master of Arts in Economics in 1984. He took up further studies in law overseas and graduated with a Master of Laws Magna Cum Laude and a Harlan Fiske Stone Award at the Columbia School of Law in 1995.

== Political career ==
In 1980, while on his senior year at law school, Rodriguez was elected member of the Misamis Oriental Provincial Board. In 1984 he became Vice Governor of Misamis Oriental and served until 1986.

In 1990, Rodriguez was appointed the law dean of the San Sebastian College of Law, Manila.

He ran for a Senate seat in the 1992 election under the Nationalist People's Coalition but lost, finishing 75th.

From 2007 to 2016, Rodriguez was elected as the representative of the second district of Cagayan de Oro in the 14th-16th Congress, ranking second among 268 congressmen on the most number of bills and resolutions filed at 554, of which 53 became Republic Acts. He was re-elected to the House in the 2010 and 2013 elections.

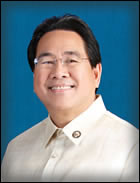
Rodriguez official portrait during the 16th Congress

In the 15th Congress, Rodriguez ranked first in the House of Representatives in number of bills and resolutions filed, with 997, 9 of which have become laws, making him the House member with the most number of bills filed that became law.

On June 19, 2009, Rodriguez received a Certificate, Leaders in Development from the John F. Kennedy School of Government of Harvard University.

In 2011 he received a Certificate on Summer Courses on Public International Law from The Hague Academy of International Law.

In June 2012, Representative Rodriguez sponsored an amendment to the Expanded Breastfeeding Promotion Act of 2009. The proposed amendment revises the provisions rendering a time for breastfeeding babies during work hours. Breastfeeding mothers would no longer be paid for time spent breastfeeding as they are under the current Milk Code, provided the breaks do not exceed 40 minutes during an eight-hour work period.

Rodriguez then attended the 17th Session of the Rhodes Academy of Oceans Law and Policy in Rhodes, Greece in July of that same year.

In 2015 Justice Undersecretary Justiniano amended a complaint against Representative Rodriguez for his part in the 2013 Pork Barrel Scam. It was for cases for malversation of funds.

Rep. Rufus Rodriguez gives his comment on the proposal of inclusion of Freedom of Panorama in Intellectual Property Code of the Philippines

During the May 9, 2016 presidential elections, Rodriguez first showed his support to candidates Grace Poe and Mar Roxas, but later in the campaign—when surveys changed in Rodrigo Duterte's favor—his support veered towards the Davao City mayor, who subsequently won.

When the 70 congressmen denied ABS-CBN's hopes of renewing its legislative broadcast franchise on July 10, 2020, he slammed the vote because the solons defied the evidence that the network has not committed numerous violations.

On 3 February 2026, Rodriguez accused House Minority Leader Rep. Marcelino Libanan of "defending China," right after his privilege speech of instituting professionalism in sensitive foreign policy, reaffirming Philippine Coast Guard spokesperson Jay Tarriela's exclusion from the speech. Rodriguez also maintained in filing an ethics probe on Libanan for purported "treason."

== Personal life ==
Rodriguez is married to Fenina Tiukinhoy of Surigao City and has a daughter, Atty. Regine Beatrice T. Rodriguez, who passed the 2021 Bar Examinations with Exemplary Performance.

== Electoral history ==
Electoral history of Rufus Rodriguez
| Year | Office | Party | Votes received | | | | Result |
| Year | Office | Party | Total | % | P. | Swing | Result |
|---|---|---|---|---|---|---|---|
| 1992 | Senator of the Philippines | NPC | 812,144 | 3.35% | 75th | —N/a | Lost |
| 2007 | Representative (Cagayan de Oro–2nd) | PMP | 43,907 | 55.53% | 1st | —N/a | Won |
| 2010 | Representative (Cagayan de Oro–2nd) | PMP | 100,059 | 96.88% | 1st | +41.35 | Won |
| 2013 | Representative (Cagayan de Oro–2nd) | CDP | 88,853 | 81.99% | 1st | -14.89 | Won |
| 2019 | Representative (Cagayan de Oro–2nd) | CDP | 82,692 | 63.13% | 1st | -18.86 | Won |
| 2022 | Representative (Cagayan de Oro–2nd) | CDP | 126,106 | 84.49% | 1st | +21.36 | Won |
| 2025 | Representative (Cagayan de Oro–2nd) | CDP | 127,646 | 94.54% | 1st | +10.05 | Won |
| 2016 | Mayor of Cagayan de Oro | CDP | 61,304 | 25.71% | 3rd | —N/a | Lost |

== Awards ==
Rodriguez was awarded “Most Outstanding Alumnus” by De La Salle University in 1999 and Xavier University in 2002.

In December 2008 he was awarded the Xavier University 75th Anniversary's Most Outstanding Alumnus Award for Public Service.

On November 14, 2010, he received the Gold Vision Triangle Award, the highest award given by the YMCA of the Philippines, for his exemplary and distinctive service to the Filipino youth.

In 2011 he was conferred a degree of Doctorate of Humanities (Civil Law), Honoris Causa, by the Central Mindanao University. That same year he was also awarded the YMCA Centennial Leadership Award for Government Service.

Rodriguez was also conferred a Doctor of Laws (Honoris Causa) degree by the University of Negros Occidental - Recoletos (UNO-R) in 2012.

House of Representatives of the Philippines
| Preceded by Maxie Rodriguez | Member of the House of Representatives from Cagayan de Oro's 2nd district 2019–present | Incumbent |
| Preceded by Constantino G. Jaraula (at-large/lone district) | Member of the House of Representatives from Cagayan de Oro's 2nd district 2007–2016 | Succeeded by Maxie Rodriguez |
