= Celso Regencia =

Filipino politician (born 1961)

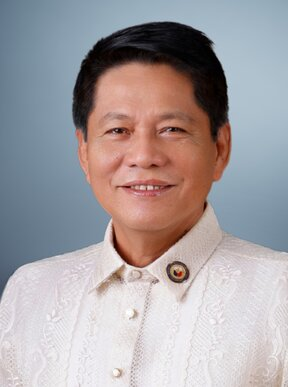
- Official portrait, 2025

Member of Philippine House of Representatives for Iligan's at-large district
- Incumbent
- Assumed office June 30, 2022
- Preceded by: Frederick Siao

Mayor of Iligan
- In office June 30, 2013 – June 30, 2022
- Vice Mayor: Jemar Vera Cruz (2016–2022); Ruderic Marzo (2013–2016)
- Preceded by: Lawrence Cruz
- Succeeded by: Frederick Siao

Personal details
- Born: Celso Gomera Regencia; January 9, 1961 (age 65) Kolambugan, Lanao del Norte, Philippines
- Party: Lakas (2022–present); United Iligan (local party; 2023–present)
- Other political affiliations: PDP–Laban (2019–2022); NPC (2016–2019); NUP (2013–2016)
- Spouse: Marissa Jimenez
- Children: 5
- Nickname: Reggie
- Police career
- Service: Philippine National Police
- Rank: Senior Superintendent

Celso Gomera Regencia (born January 9, 1961) is a Filipino retired police officer and politician who has served as the representative for Iligan's at-large congressional district in the Philippine House of Representatives since 2022. Currently a member of Lakas–CMD, he previously served as mayor of Iligan from 2013 to 2022.

== Career ==
=== Police career ===
Regencia graduated as a member of the Philippine National Police Academy Tagapaglingkod Class of 1987. Prior to entering public office, he served in the Philippine National Police, holding the rank of Police Senior Superintendent.

=== Mayor of Iligan (2013–2022) ===
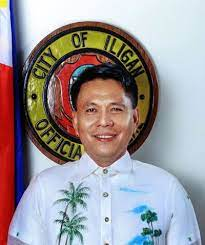
Official portrait as mayor of Iligan

Regencia was elected mayor of Iligan in 2013 under the National Unity Party. In January 2015, he was accused of being behind the ambush of former representative Vicente Belmonte Jr. and was detained on charges of murder and frustrated murder after surrendering to authorities in October of the same year. The Quezon City Regional Trial Court Branch 77 later acquitted him on January 25, 2017, after the Department of Justice ordered the withdrawal of all charges filed in court, finding insufficient evidence and lack of probable cause to indict him and his nine co-accused.

In March 2015, Regencia was suspended from office for six months for alleged abuse of authority following a complaint filed against him by the city's Sangguniang Panlungsod. He successfully ran for a second term in 2016 under the Nationalist People's Coalition, and for a third term in 2019 under PDP–Laban.

During his final term as mayor, the Iligan City Wet Park, a public civic park, was opened and was cited as one of the major accomplishments of his administration.

=== House of Representatives (2022–present) ===
==== 2022 and 2025 elections ====
Regencia ran for Iligan's at-large congressional district in 2022, winning against Belmonte, who was endorsed by incumbent representative Frederick Siao, by a margin of 5,000 votes. He was re-elected in 2025.

==== Tenure ====
Regencia filed various bills in the 20th Congress seeking to declare ecotourism sites and tourist destinations.

He was among the 215 representatives who signed the first impeachment complaint against Vice President Sara Duterte in 2025, and later voted in favor of her impeachment in 2026.

==== Committee membership ====
- Committee on Dangerous Drugs (Vice Chair)
- Committee on Legislative Franchises (Vice Chair)
- Committee on Mindanao Affairs (Vice Chair)
- Committee on Agriculture and Food
- Committee on Appropriations
- Committee on Games and Amusements
- Committee on Health
- Committee on Public Order and Safety
- Committee on Public Works and Highways
- Committee on Social Services
- Committee on Suffrage and Electoral Reforms
- Committee on Tourism

== Electoral history ==
Electoral history of Celso Regencia
Year	Office	Party		Votes received				Result
Year	Office	Local	National	Total	%	P.	Swing	Result
2013	Mayor of Iligan	—N/a	NUP	43,586	44.43	1st	—N/a	Won
2016	Mayor of Iligan	—N/a	NPC	68,995	58.51%	1st	+14.08	Won
2019	Mayor of Iligan	—N/a	PDP–Laban	74,835	56.04%	1st	-2.47	Won
2022	Representative (Iligan at-large)	—N/a	PDP–Laban	75,426	51.76%	1st	—N/a	Won
2025	Representative (Iligan at-large)	United Iligan	Lakas	74,818	49.34%	1st	-2.42	Won

House of Representatives of the Philippines
Preceded by Frederick Siao	Member for Iligan's at-large district June 30, 2022 – present	Incumbent
Political offices
Preceded by Lawrence Cruz	Mayor of Iligan; June 30, 2013 – June 30, 2022	Succeeded by Frederick Siao
