= Philippine House Special Committee on the East ASEAN Growth Area =

Special committee of the House of Representatives of the Philippines

Special Committee on the East ASEAN Growth Area
- 20th Congress

History
- New session started: July 28, 2025

Leadership
- Chairman: Vacant since June 30, 2025
- Minority Leader: Vacant since June 30, 2025

Website
- Special Committee on the East ASEAN Growth Area

The Philippine House Special Committee on the East ASEAN Growth Area is a special committee of the Philippine House of Representatives.

== Jurisdiction ==
As prescribed by House Rules, the committee's jurisdiction includes the following:

- Social, political, economic policies affecting the East ASEAN Growth Area
- Promotion of trade and investment among the bloc's four constituent countries: Brunei, Indonesia, Malaysia and the Philippines

== Members, 20th Congress ==
As of June 30, 2025, all committee membership positions are vacant.

== Historical membership rosters ==
=== 18th Congress ===
Position	Members	Party	Province/City	District
Chairperson	Sabiniano Canama	COOP-NATCCO	Party-list	
Vice Chairpersons	Rashid Matba	PDP–Laban	Tawi-Tawi	Lone
Vice Chairpersons	Gil Acosta	PPP	Palawan	3rd
Vice Chairpersons	Ansaruddin Abdul Malik Adiong	Nacionalista	Lanao del Sur	1st
Vice Chairpersons	Munir Arbison	Nacionalista	Sulu	2nd
Vice Chairpersons	Shirlyn Bañas-Nograles	PDP–Laban	South Cotabato	1st
Member for the Majority	Alan Dujali	PDP–Laban	Davao del Norte	2nd
Members for the Minority	Angelica Natasha Co	BHW	Party-list	
Members for the Minority	Ma. Victoria A. Umali	A TEACHER	Party-list	

==== Chairperson ====
- Rogelio Pacquiao (Sarangani–Lone, PDP–Laban) August 13, 2019 – October 13, 2020

== See also ==
- House of Representatives of the Philippines
- List of Philippine House of Representatives committees
