= Cagayan de Oro's 2nd congressional district =

Congressional district in the Philippines

- Constituency for the House of Representatives of the Philippines
- Map
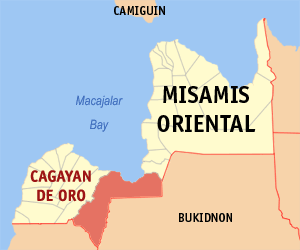
- Location of Cagayan de Oro within Misamis Oriental
- City: Cagayan de Oro
- Region: Northern Mindanao
- Population: 342,474 (2015)
- Electorate: 180,214 (2019)
- Major settlements: 56 barangays: Barangays; Barangays 1–40 (City Proper); Agusan; Balubal; Bugo; Camaman-an; Consolacion; Cugman; F.S. Catanico; Gusa; Indahag; Lapasan (Agora); Macabalan; Macasandig; Nazareth; Puerto; Puntod; Tablon
- Area: 123.50 km^{2} (47.68 sq mi)

Current constituency
- Created: 2007
- Representative: Rufus Rodriguez
- Political party: CDP
- Congressional bloc: Majority

Cagayan de Oro's 2nd congressional district is one of the two congressional districts of the Philippines in Cagayan de Oro. It has been represented in the House of Representatives since 2007. It was created by the 2007 reapportionment that divided the city into two congressional districts and which took effect in the same year. The district is composed of the barangays located east of the Cagayan River and includes the city's downtown commercial core and port area. It is currently represented in the 20th Congress by Rufus Rodriguez of the Centrist Democratic Party of the Philippines (CDP).

== Representation history ==
#	Image	Member	Term of office		Congress	Party	Electoral history	Constituent LGUs
#	Image	Member	Start	End	Congress	Party	Electoral history	Constituent LGUs
=== Cagayan de Oro's 2nd district for the House of Representatives of the Philippines ===
District created February 22, 2007 from Cagayan de Oro's at-large district.
1		Rufus Rodriguez	June 30, 2007	June 30, 2016	14th	PMP	Elected in 2007.	2007–present Barangays 1–40 (City Proper), Agusan, Balubal, Bugo, Camaman-an, Consolacion, Cugman, F.S. Catanico, Gusa, Indahag, Lapasan (Agora), Macabalan, Macasandig, Nazareth, Puerto, Puntod, Tablon
1		Rufus Rodriguez	June 30, 2007	June 30, 2016	15th	CDP	Re-elected in 2010.	2007–present Barangays 1–40 (City Proper), Agusan, Balubal, Bugo, Camaman-an, Consolacion, Cugman, F.S. Catanico, Gusa, Indahag, Lapasan (Agora), Macabalan, Macasandig, Nazareth, Puerto, Puntod, Tablon
1		Rufus Rodriguez	June 30, 2007	June 30, 2016	16th	CDP	Re-elected in 2013.	2007–present Barangays 1–40 (City Proper), Agusan, Balubal, Bugo, Camaman-an, Consolacion, Cugman, F.S. Catanico, Gusa, Indahag, Lapasan (Agora), Macabalan, Macasandig, Nazareth, Puerto, Puntod, Tablon
2		Maximo Rodriguez Jr.	June 30, 2016	June 30, 2019	17th	PDP–Laban	Elected in 2016.	2007–present Barangays 1–40 (City Proper), Agusan, Balubal, Bugo, Camaman-an, Consolacion, Cugman, F.S. Catanico, Gusa, Indahag, Lapasan (Agora), Macabalan, Macasandig, Nazareth, Puerto, Puntod, Tablon
(1)		Rufus Rodriguez	June 30, 2019	Incumbent	18th	CDP	Elected in 2019.	2007–present Barangays 1–40 (City Proper), Agusan, Balubal, Bugo, Camaman-an, Consolacion, Cugman, F.S. Catanico, Gusa, Indahag, Lapasan (Agora), Macabalan, Macasandig, Nazareth, Puerto, Puntod, Tablon
(1)		Rufus Rodriguez	June 30, 2019	Incumbent	19th	CDP	Re-elected in 2022.	2007–present Barangays 1–40 (City Proper), Agusan, Balubal, Bugo, Camaman-an, Consolacion, Cugman, F.S. Catanico, Gusa, Indahag, Lapasan (Agora), Macabalan, Macasandig, Nazareth, Puerto, Puntod, Tablon
(1)		Rufus Rodriguez	June 30, 2019	Incumbent	20th	CDP	Re-elected in 2025.	2007–present Barangays 1–40 (City Proper), Agusan, Balubal, Bugo, Camaman-an, Consolacion, Cugman, F.S. Catanico, Gusa, Indahag, Lapasan (Agora), Macabalan, Macasandig, Nazareth, Puerto, Puntod, Tablon

== Election results ==
=== 2025 ===
2025 Philippine House of Representatives elections in Cagayan de Oro's 2nd district
Party	Candidate	Votes	%
CDP	Rufus Rodriguez	127,646	94.54%
Independent	Bebs Morales	7,369	5.46%
Total votes		149,259	100%
CDP hold			

=== 2022 ===
2022 Philippine House of Representatives elections in Cagayan de Oro's 2nd district
Party	Candidate	Votes	%
CDP	Rufus Rodriguez	126,106	84.49%
PRP	Irene Floro	23,153	15.51%
Total votes		149,259	100%
CDP hold			

=== 2019 ===
2019 Philippine House of Representatives elections in Cagayan de Oro's 2nd district
Party	Candidate	Votes	%
CDP	Rufus Rodriguez	82,692	63.13%
PDP–Laban	Alam Lim	46,861	35.78%
PFP	Roger Villazorda	1,422	1.09%
Total votes		130,975	100%
CDP gain from PDP–Laban			

=== 2016 ===
2016 Philippine House of Representatives elections in Cagayan de Oro's 2nd district
Party	Candidate	Votes	%
Independent	Maximo Rodriguez Jr.	46,363	40.05%
UNA	Ramon Tabor	34,123	29.48%
Liberal	Edgar Cabanlas	29,343	25.35%
Independent	Evangeline Carrasco	4,905	4.23%
Independent	Chito Fernandez	507	0.43%
Independent	Celso Balat	502	0.43%
Total votes		115,743	100%
Independent gain from CDP			

=== 2010 ===
2010 Philippine House of Representatives elections in Cagayan de Oro's 2nd district
Party	Candidate	Votes	%
PMP	Rufus Rodriguez	100,059	96.88%
Liberal	Samuel Aloysius Jardin	2,798	2.71%
Independent	Alrhoy Naliponguit	426	0.41%
Total votes		103,283	100%
PMP hold			

=== 2007 ===
2007 Philippine House of Representatives elections in Cagayan de Oro's 2nd district
Party	Candidate	Votes	%
PMP	Rufus Rodriguez	43,907	55.53%
PADAYN	Jose Benjamin Benaldo	35,162	44.47%
Total votes		79,069	100%
PMP win (new seat)			

== See also ==
- Legislative districts of Cagayan de Oro
