= Philippine House Committee on Mindanao Affairs =

Standing committee of the House of Representatives of the Philippines

Committee on Mindanao Affairs
- 20th Congress

History
- New session started: To convene on July 28, 2025

Leadership
- Chairman: Vacant
- Minority Leader: Vacant

Website
- Committee on Mindanao Affairs

The Philippine House Committee on Mindanao Affairs, or House Mindanao Affairs Committee is a standing committee of the Philippine House of Representatives.

== Jurisdiction ==
As prescribed by House Rules, the committee's jurisdiction is on Mindanao's development which includes the preparation of a comprehensive and integrated development plan for the said island group.

== Members, 20th Congress ==
As of June 30, 2025, all committee membership positions are vacant until the House convenes for its first regular session on July 28.

== Historical membership rosters ==
=== 18th Congress ===
Position	Members	Party	Province/City	District
Chairperson	Mohamad Khalid Dimaporo	PDP–Laban	Lanao del Norte	1st
Vice Chairpersons	Rogelio Pacquiao	PDP–Laban	Sarangani	Lone
Vice Chairpersons	Adolph Edward Plaza	NUP	Agusan del Sur	2nd
Vice Chairpersons	Esmael Mangudadatu	PDP–Laban	Maguindanao	2nd
Vice Chairpersons	Ansaruddin Abdul Malik Adiong	Nacionalista	Lanao del Sur	1st
Vice Chairpersons	Abdulmunir Arbison	Nacionalista	Sulu	2nd
Vice Chairpersons	Alberto Pacquiao	OFWFC	Party-list	
Members for the Majority	Rashidin Matba	PDP–Laban	Tawi-Tawi	Lone
Members for the Majority	Diego Ty	NUP	Misamis Occidental	1st
Members for the Majority	Juliette Uy	NUP	Misamis Oriental	2nd
Members for the Majority	Datu Roonie Sinsuat Sr.	PDP–Laban	Maguindanao	1st
Members for the Majority	Princess Rihan Sakaluran	NUP	Sultan Kudarat	1st
Members for the Majority	Shirlyn Bañas-Nograles	PDP–Laban	South Cotabato	1st
Members for the Majority	Yasser Balindong	Lakas	Lanao del Sur	2nd
Members for the Majority	Amihilda Sangcopan	AMIN	Party-list	
Members for the Minority	Eufemia Cullamat	Bayan Muna	Party-list	
Members for the Minority	Sergio Dago-oc	APEC	Party-list	
Members for the Minority	Arnolfo Teves Jr.	PDP–Laban	Negros Oriental	3rd
Members for the Minority	Lawrence Lemuel Fortun	Nacionalista	Agusan del Norte	1st

== See also ==
- House of Representatives of the Philippines
- List of Philippine House of Representatives committees
