= Centrist Democratic Party of the Philippines =

- President: Rufus Rodriguez
- Chairman: Lito Monico Lorenzana
- Founder: Rufus Rodriguez
- Founded: 2010; September 12, 2012 (registered)
- Headquarters: 2/F Mille Building, 335-337 Sen. Gil Puyat Avenue (Buendia) corner Dominga Street, Pasay
- Think tank: Centrist Democracy Political Institute
- Youth wing: Centrist Democratic Youth Association of the Philippines
- Ideology: Christian democracy Federalism
- Political position: Center-right
- Colors: Blue
- Slogan: Ang Partido ng Tunay na Demokrasya (The Party of True Democracy)
- Senate: 0 / 24
- House of Representatives: 1 / 318

The Centrist Democratic Party of the Philippines (CDP) is a Christian democratic party in the Philippines. Created in 2010, it is headed by Cagayan de Oro representative Rufus Rodriguez. The party aims to "institutionalize an alternative to patronage-oriented political parties".

== History ==
The party recognizes Senators Manuel Manahan and Raul Manglapus as the earliest proponents of Christian democracy in the Philippines. The party also recognizes Ninoy Aquino and Aquilino Pimentel Jr. as primary proponents of the ideology in the country. Lito Monico Lorenzana, one of the members of the cabinet of President Corazon Aquino, founded the Centrist Democratic Movement (CDM), that would eventually evolve into the CDP.

On September 12, 2012, the party was accredited by the Commission on Elections. A month later, the party, while not putting up candidates for the 2013 Senate election, announced that they are supporting the candidacies of Francis Escudero, Aquilino Pimentel III and Bam Aquino, all from Team PNoy. Newly-installed party leader Rufus Rodriguez remarked that the CDP has a "real ideology" unlike other parties, while Lorenzana claimed not to be beholden to anyone, and abhorred patronage politics. Aside from supporting three senatorial candidates, the party has 74 candidates for lower positions.

In its campaign for the 2013 elections, the party started a road show for constitutional reform or charter change (Cha-cha). Rodriguez, who is a proponent of charter change, had earlier written a House of Representatives resolution calling for a shift to federalism, return to a two-party system, regional or state election of senators, amendment of the presidential term of office to four years with one reelection and a four-year term with no term limits for local officials, and lifting of nationalist economic provisions in the constitution.

In the 2016 local elections in the town of Salcedo, Eastern Samar, Melchor Llego Mergal ran for mayor under the CDP (as a guest candidate of the Liberal Party/Koalisyon ng Daang Matuwid and the Coalition for Change/Kilusang Pagbabago) with Maricris "Utay" Duran Fabillar and won. Mergal and Duran eventually became the party's highest-ranking officials.

== Electoral performance ==
=== Presidential and vice presidential elections ===
Year	Presidential election			Vice presidential election		
Year	Candidate	Vote share	Result	Candidate	Vote share	Result
2016	None (Note: CDP endorsed Rodrigo Duterte who won for president.)		Rodrigo Duterte (PDP–Laban)	None (Note: CDP endorsed Leni Robredo for vice president.)		Leni Robredo (Liberal)
2022	None (Note: CDP endorsed Leni Robredo for president.)		Bongbong Marcos (PFP)	None (Note: CDP endorsed Sara Duterte who won for vice president.)		Sara Duterte (Lakas-CMD)

=== Senate ===
The CDP has never put up candidates for the Senate but has endorsed candidates from other parties.

=== House of Representatives ===
Party president Rufus Rodriguez, the representative from Cagayan de Oro's 2nd congressional district. consistently holds the party's sole seat in the House of Representatives.

Election	Number of votes	Share of votes	Seats	Outcome of election
2013	68,281	0.24%	1 / 293	Joined the majority bloc
2016	13,662	0.04%	0 / 297	Lost
2019	81,741	0.20%	1 / 304	Joined the majority bloc
2022	128,134	0.27%	1 / 316	Joined the majority bloc
2025	127,646	0.25%	1 / 317	Joined the majority bloc
