= Bryan Revilla =

Filipino politician (born 1986)

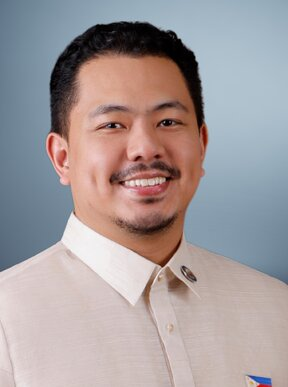
- Official portrait, 2026

Member of the Philippine House of Representatives for Agimat Partylist
- Incumbent
- Assumed office July 25, 2022
- Preceded by: Position established

Personal details
- Born: Leonard Bryan Hernandez Bautista; November 22, 1986 (age 39) Makati, Philippines
- Party: Agimat
- Parents: Bong Revilla (father); Lani Mercado (mother)
- Relatives: Jolo Revilla (brother); Ramon Revilla Sr. (grandfather)
- Occupation: Politician

Leonard Bryan Hernandez Bautista (born November 22, 1986), better known as Bryan Revilla is a Filipino actor and politician who has served as representative for Agimat Partylist since 2022. He is also the son of former senator Bong Revilla and representative Lani Mercado. His siblings include fellow representative Jolo Revilla and Cavite vice governor Ramon Vicente Revilla.

== Political career ==
In the 2022 Philippine House of Representatives elections, he was a nominee for the Agimat Partylist. Agimat eventually won one seat, which was given to him. He was re-elected in 2025.

In his tenure as representative, he principally authored 240 bills and co-authored 66 bills. Revilla supports the labor industry, the health industry, and the economic industry. He is part of multiple committees, including:

- Creative Industries — Member for the Majority
- Disaster Resilience — Member for the Majority
- Foreign Affairs - Member for the Majority
- Games And Amusements — Member for the Majority
- Information and Communications Technology — Member for the Majority
- Land Use — Member for the Majority
- Peace, Reconciliation and Unity — Member for the Majority
- Youth and Sports Development — Member for the Majority
- Rules — Assistant Majority Leader

== Electoral history ==
Electoral history of Bryan Revilla
| Year | Office | Party | Votes received | | | | Result |
| Year | Office | Party | Total | % | P. | Swing | Result |
|---|---|---|---|---|---|---|---|
| 2022 | Representative (Party-list) | Agimat | 586,909 | 1.61% | 13th | —N/a | Won |
| 2025 | Representative (Party-list) | Agimat | 420,813 | 1.00% | 25th | -0.61 | Won |
