= Vanvan Aumentado =

Filipino businesswoman and politician (born 1981)

Maria Vanessa Cadorna Aumentado
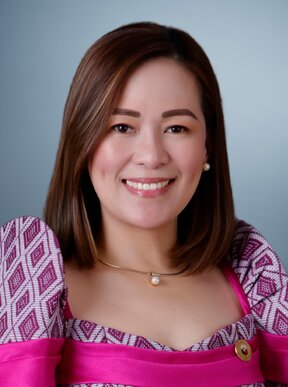
- Official portrait, 2025

Member of the Philippine House of Representatives from Bohol's 2nd District
- Incumbent
- Assumed office June 30, 2022
- Preceded by: Erico Aristotle Aumentado

Personal details
- Born: Maria Vanessa Cabatingan Cadorna; May 21, 1981 (age 45) Tagbilaran, Bohol, Philippines
- Party: NUP (2026–present)
- Other political affiliations: Lakas (2022–2026); PRP (2021–2022)
- Spouse: Erico Aristotle Aumentado

Maria Vanessa Cadorna-Aumentado, also known in Bohol as Vanvan (born May 21, 1981), is a Filipino businesswoman, registered nurse and politician. She is a member of the House of Representatives, representing the 2nd District of Bohol since 2022.

== Early life and education ==
Maria Vanessa Cadorna was born in May 21, 1981, and the youngest among six children. Her father is a ship captain and her mother is a school teacher.

Vanvan graduated both class salutatorian at Duero Central Elementary School in 1994 and at Immaculate Academy in 1998. In college, she completed her Bachelor of Commerce major in Management at Holy Name University in 2002.

She worked as a PSBank teller from 2003-2005 in Tagbilaran City. She then went back to school and took up Bachelor of Science Nursing from 2005-2009. She successfully passed the Licensure Board Exams for Nurses in July 2009.

She became a Dialysis Nurse at the Bohol Medical Care Institute.

She married Erico Aristotle Aumentado on September 7, 2003 with whom she has two sons and a daughter.

== Miss Sandugo ==
Vanvan finished 1st runners-up at 2001 Miss Bohol Sandugo representing her hometown of Duero. She later became the 2001 Miss Bohol titleholder when the earlier titleholder from Valencia wasn't able to finish her reign, thus earning her the coveted crown, subsequently accepting the roles and responsibilities of the winner.

== Political career ==
Aumentado's first stint in politics was during the 2022 Bohol local elections when she ran for representative of Bohol's 2nd District, after her husband Erico Aristotle Aumentado ran for governor, ending the latter's three consecutive terms as congressman. She filed her certificate of candidacy (COC) on October 7, 2021.

=== Representative, Bohol's 2nd District ===
On May 9, 2022, Aumentado won and elected as the new representative of the province's 2nd District during the 2022 Bohol local elections besting other four candidates via a landslide victory. She also became the first congresswoman from Bohol's 2nd District and third congresswoman from Bohol after Venice Borja-Agana and Kristine Alexie Besas-Tutor. On May 11, 2022, she was proclaimed new congresswoman of the second district of Bohol

On February 5, 2025, Aumentado (No. 119) was one of three legislators of Bohol, together with 214 others signed the impeachment complaint against incumbent Vice President Sara Duterte at the plenary hall of House of Representatives.

==== House Committee membership ====
- Vice-chairperson, Creative Industries
- Vice-chairperson, Tourism
- Member of the Majority, Accounts
- Member of the Majority, Appropriations
- Member of the Majority, Disaster Resilience
- Member of the Majority, Ecology
- Member of the Majority, Health
- Member of the Majority, Science and Technology
- Member of the Majority, Trade and Industry
- Member of the Majority, Visayas Development

== Passed bills ==
Principal Authored Bills
  - HB0004 - enacted as Republic Act 11967 - an act providing protection to consumers and merchants engaged in internet transactions, creating for the purpose the electronic commerce bureau, and appropriating funds therefor, 2023-12-05
  - HB01171 - enacted as Republic Act 11960 - an act promoting inclusive and sustainable economic development through the institutionalization of "one town, one product" Philippines program and appropriating funds therefor, 2023-08-24
  - HB05961 - enacted as Republic Act 11957 - an act recognizing the municipality of baler in the province of aurora as the “birthplace of Philippine surfing” and declaring it an ecotourism destination, (lapsed into law on 2023-08-06)
  - HB06510 - enacted as Republic Act 11983 - an act providing for a new passport law, repealing for the purpose Republic Act no. 8239, otherwise known as the “Philippine passport act of 1996”, 2024-03-11
  - HB06558 - enacted as Republic Act 12001 - an act instituting reforms in real property valuation and assessment in the Philippines, reorganizing the bureau of local government finance, and appropriating funds therefor, 2024-06-13
  - HB06608 - enacted Republic Act 119540 - an act establishing the Maharlika investment fund, providing for the management, investment, and use of the proceeds of the fund, and appropriating funds therefor, 2023-07-18
  - HB07535 - enacted Republic Act 11982 - an act granting additional benefits to Filipino centenarians, recognizing octogenarians and nonagenarians, and appropriating funds therefor, amending for the purpose Republic Act no. 10868, otherwise known as the “centenarians act of 2016”, 2024-02-26
  - HB07751 - enacted Republic Act 11959 - an act establishing specialty centers in hospitals under the direct supervision and control of the department of health, and appropriating funds therefor, 2023-08-24
  - HB07939 - enacted Republic Act 11958 - an act rationalizing the disability pension of veterans, amending for the purpose Republic Act no. 6948, entitled, “an act standardizing and upgrading the benefits for military veterans and their dependents,” as amended, 2023-08-24
  - HB08525 - enacted Republic Act 11981 - an act mandating the formulation, financing, implementation, monitoring, and evaluation of a comprehensive and multi-year "tatak pinoy" (proudly Filipino) strategy, establishing a tatak pinoy council, and appropriating funds therefor, 2024-02-26
  - HB08980 - enacted Republic Act 11975 - an act appropriating funds for the operation of the government of the republic of the Philippines from January one to December thirty-one, two thousand and twenty-four, 2023-12-20
  - HB09682 - enacted Republic Act 11997 - an act institutionalizing the grant of teaching supplies allowance for public school teachers and appropriating funds therefor, 2024-05-31

House of Representatives of the Philippines
Preceded by Erico Aristotle Aumentado	Member of the House of Representatives from Bohol's 2nd district 2022–present	Incumbent
