= Roy Gonzales =

Filipino politician (born 1971)

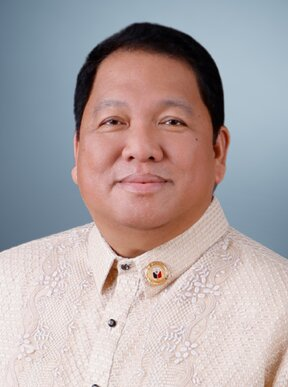
- Official portrait, 2026

Member of Philippine House of Representatives for Santa Rosa's at-large district
- Incumbent
- Assumed office June 30, 2025
- Preceded by: Dan Fernandez

Member of the Santa Rosa City Council
- In office June 30, 2016 – June 30, 2025
- In office 2005–2007

Personal details
- Born: Roy Maragat Gonzales; October 30, 1971 (age 54) Santa Rosa, Laguna, Philippines
- Party: PFP (2026–present)
- Other political affiliations: Lakas (2024–2026); PDP–Laban (2016–2024); Liberal (2015–2016)
- Spouse: Mylene Gonzales
- Education: St. Peter’s College Seminary (AB)

Roy Maragat Gonzales (born October 30, 1971) is a Filipino politician who has served as the representative for the Santa Rosa's at-large congressional district in the Philippine House of Representatives since 2025. Currently a member of the Partido Federal ng Pilipinas, he previously served as a member of the Santa Rosa City Council from 2016 to 2025.

== Early life and education ==
Roy Maragat Gonzales was born on October 30, 1971, in Santa Rosa, Laguna, to Rosauro Gonzales and Rosenda Maragat. He attended St. Peter’s College Seminary, where he earned a Bachelor of Arts degree in Classical Philosophy in 1993. He later earned an AB in Theological Studies from the Divine Word School of Theology in 1997 and took master's units in Public Administration at the Philippine Women's University.

== Santa Rosa City Council (2016–2025) ==
Gonzales was first appointed as city councilor of Santa Rosa from 2005 to 2007, before serving three terms as an elected councilor from 2016 to 2025, ranking first, fifth, and third, respectively, in the 2016, 2019, and 2022 elections.

== House of Representatives (2025–present) ==
Gonzales ran in 2025 for Santa Rosa's at-large congressional district under Lakas–CMD against incumbent Dan Fernandez's son, Danzel Fernandez, the National Unity Party candidate, and won by a margin of over 26,000 votes.

=== Committee membership ===
==== 20th Congress ====
- Special Committee on Globalization and WTO (Vice Chair)
- Committee on Housing and Urban Development (Vice Chair)
- Special Committee on Nuclear Energy (Vice Chair)
- Special Committee on Southern Tagalog Development (Vice Chair)
- Committee on Tourism (Vice Chair)
- Committee on Appropriations
- Committee on Energy
- Committee on Games and Amusements
- Special Committee on Land Use
- Committee on Legislative Franchises
- Committee on Public Works and Highways
- Committee on Senior Citizens
- Committee on Transportation
- Committee on Ways and Means

== Electoral history ==
Electoral history of Roy Gonzales
Year	Office	Party	Votes received				Result
Year	Office	Party	Total	%	P.	Swing	Result
2016	Councilor of Santa Rosa	Liberal	67,107	6.45%	1st	—N/a	Won
2019	Councilor of Santa Rosa	PDP–Laban	71,512	7.18%	5th	+0.73	Won
2022	Councilor of Santa Rosa	PDP–Laban	98,458	6.77%	3rd	−0.41	Won
2025	Representative (Santa Rosa)	Lakas	86,177	49.36%	1st	—N/a	Won

House of Representatives of the Philippines
Preceded by Dan Fernandez	Member of Philippine House of Representatives for Santa Rosa's at-large district 2025–present	Incumbent
