= Philippine House Committee on Aquaculture and Fisheries Resources =

Standing committee of the House of Representatives of the Philippines

Committee on Aquaculture and Fisheries Resources
- 20th Congress

History
- New session started: July 28, 2025

Leadership
- Chair: Hori Horibata, NUP since July 30, 2025
- Minority Leader: Vacant since June 30, 2025

Website
- Committee on Aquaculture and Fisheries Resources

The Philippine House Committee on Aquaculture and Fisheries Resources, or House Aquaculture and Fisheries Resources Committee is a standing committee of the Philippine House of Representatives.

== Jurisdiction ==
As prescribed by House Rules, the committee's jurisdiction includes the following:

- Aquaculture and fisheries education and training including extension services, conservation of streams, rivers, lakes and other fisheries resources
- Aquaculture and fisheries production and development
- Business of aquaculture
- Fishpond and fisheries culture production and development including related technical, financial and guarantee assistance programs
- Fresh water and fisheries culture research and technology applications
- Use of aquatic resources

== Senate Counterpart ==
The jurisdiction of the House Committee on Aquaculture and Fisheries Resources has a counterpart in the Senate:

- Senate Committee on Agriculture, Food and Agrarian Reform

== Members, 20th Congress ==
Position	Member	Constituency	Party
Chairperson	Hori Horibata	Camarines Sur–1st	NUP
Vice Chairpersons	Vacant		
Members for the Majority	Vacant		
Members for the Minority	Vacant		

== Historical membership rosters ==
=== 18th Congress ===
Position	Members	Party	Province/City	District
Chairperson	Leo Rafael Cueva	NUP	Negros Occidental	2nd
Vice Chairpersons	Ciriaco Gato Jr.	NPC	Batanes	Lone
Vice Chairpersons	Diego Ty	NUP	Misamis Occidental	1st
Vice Chairpersons	Janice Salimbangon	NUP	Cebu	4th
Vice Chairpersons	Alan 1 Ecleo	PDP–Laban	Dinagat Islands	Lone
Vice Chairpersons	Rommel Rico Angara	LDP	Aurora	Lone
Vice Chairpersons	Gil Acosta	PPP	Palawan	3rd
Vice Chairpersons	Macnell Lusotan	MARINO	Party-list	
Members for the Majority	Abdullah Dimaporo	NPC	Lanao del Norte	2nd
Members for the Majority	Leonardo Babasa Jr.	PDP–Laban	Zamboanga del Sur	2nd
Members for the Majority	Esmael Mangudadatu	PDP–Laban	Maguindanao	2nd
Members for the Majority	Samier Tan	PDP–Laban	Sulu	1st
Members for the Majority	John Reynald Tiangco	Partido Navoteño	Navotas	Lone
Members for the Majority	Jake Vincent Villa	NPC	Siquijor	Lone
Members for the Majority	Gerardo Valmayor Jr.	NPC	Negros Occidental	1st
Members for the Majority	Michael John Duavit	NPC	Rizal	1st
Members for the Majority	Arnold Celeste	Nacionalista	Pangasinan	1st
Members for the Majority	Romeo Jalosjos Jr.	Nacionalista	Zamboanga del Norte	1st
Members for the Majority	Shirlyn Bañas-Nograles	South Cotabato	PDP–Laban	1st
Members for the Minority	Argel Joseph Cabatbat	MAGSASAKA	Party-list	
Members for the Minority	Isagani Amatong	Liberal	Zamboanga del Norte	3rd
Members for the Minority	Ferdinand Gaite	Bayan Muna	Party-list	
Members for the Minority	Gabriel Bordado Jr.	Liberal	Camarines Sur	3rd
Members for the Minority	Eufemia Cullamat	Bayan Muna	Party-list	

==== Member for the Majority ====
- Bernardita Ramos (Note: Died on September 8, 2020.) (Sorsogon–2nd, NPC)

== See also ==
- House of Representatives of the Philippines
- List of Philippine House of Representatives committees
- Bureau of Fisheries and Aquatic Resources
