= List of Philippine House of Representatives committees =

This is a complete list of Philippine congressional committees (standing committees, and special committees) that are currently operating in the House of Representatives of the Philippines, the lower house of the Philippine Congress.

The House has 66 standing committees, 15 special committees and 4 ad hoc committees during the 20th Congress. Chairpersons of eight select committees were elected on July 29, 2025.

== Standing committees ==
Committee	Chair	Party	Senior minority member	Party	Total members
Accounts	Maricar Zamora	Lakas	Arlyn Ayon	Swerte	60
Agrarian Reform	Eleanor Begtang	NPC	Eli San Fernando	Kamanggagawa	40
Agriculture and Food	Mark Enverga	NPC	Allan Ty	LPGMA	100
Appropriations	Mikaela Suansing	PFP	Jonathan Clement Abalos	4Ps	140
Aquaculture and Fisheries Resources	Hori Horibata	NUP	Sheen Gonzales	NUP	55
Banks and Financial Intermediaries	Irwin Tieng	NUP	Terry Ridon	Bicol Saro	45
Basic Education and Culture	Roman Romulo	NPC	Jonathan Clement Abalos	4Ps	65
Civil Service and Professional Regulation	Laarni Roque	Nacionalista	Arlyn Ayon	Swerte	35
Climate Change	Aniela Tolentino	NUP	Iris Marie Montes	4K	20
Constitutional Amendments	Rufus Rodriguez	CDP	Jonathan Clement Abalos	4Ps	55
Cooperatives Development	Felimon Espares	Coop‑NATCCO	Jonathan Clement Abalos	4Ps	25
Dangerous Drugs	Jonathan Keith Flores	Lakas	Alden Almario	MKTZNU	45
Disaster Resilience	Joseph Lara	Lakas	JC Rahman Nava	NUP	30
Ecology	Vanvan Aumentado	Lakas	Renee Co	Kabataan	35
Economic Affairs	Antonio Legarda Jr.	NPC	Roberto Nazal Jr.	BH	35
Energy	Jose Alvarez	NPC	Terry Ridon	Bicol Saro	70
Ethics and Privileges	Jonathan Clement Abalos (Note: Chair from the minority bloc)	4Ps	Chel Diokno	Akbayan	25
Flagship Programs and Projects	Jose Arturo Garcia Jr.	NPC	Dadah Kiram Ismula	Akbayan	20
Foreign Affairs	Maria Rachel Arenas	Lakas	Jonathan Clement Abalos	4Ps	55
Games and Amusements	Antonio Ferrer	NUP	Terry Ridon	Bicol Saro	70
Good Government and Public Accountability	Joel Chua	NUP	Terry Ridon	Bicol Saro	45
Government Enterprises and Privatization	Eric Olivarez	Lakas	Eli San Fernando	Kamanggagawa	35
Government Reorganization	Salvador Pleyto	PFP	Chel Diokno	Akbayan	25
Health	Jun Gato	NPC	Arlyn Ayon	Swerte	85
Higher and Technical Education	Jude Acidre	Tingog	Jonathan Clement Abalos	4Ps	70
Housing and Urban Development	Marivic Co-Pilar	NUP	Terry Ridon	Bicol Saro	55
Human Rights	Benny Abante	NUP	Chel Diokno	Akbayan	35
Indigenous Cultural Communities and Indigenous Peoples	Mauricio Domogan	Lakas	Dadah Kiram Ismula	Akbayan	25
Information and Communications Technology	Miguel Luis Villafuerte	NUP	Arlyn Ayon	Swerte	55
Inter-Parliamentary Relations and Diplomacy	Gina de Venecia	Lakas	Jonathan Clement Abalos	4Ps	50
Justice	Gerville Luistro	Lakas	Terry Ridon	Bicol Saro	55
Labor and Employment	Jolo Revilla	Lakas	Allan Ty	LPGMA	45
Legislative Franchises	Jeffrey Ferrer	NUP	Arlyn Ayon	Swerte	60
Local Government	Florencio Miraflores	NPC	Arlyn Ayon	Swerte	65
Metro Manila Development	Dean Asistio	Lakas	Jonathan Clement Abalos	4Ps	50
Micro, Small and Medium Enterprise Development	Leody Tarriela	PFP	Iris Marie Montes	4K	25
Mindanao Affairs	Jason Almonte	Nacionalista	Dadah Kiram Ismula	Akbayan	60
Muslim Affairs	Dimple Mastura	Lakas	Dadah Kiram Ismula	Akbayan	20
National Defense and Security	Oscar Malapitan	Nacionalista	Jonathan Clement Abalos	4Ps	65
Natural Resources	Alfredo Marañon III	NUP	Terry Ridon	Bicol Saro	65
North Luzon Growth Quadrangle	Angelo Marcos Barba	Nacionalista	Allan Ty	LPGMA	35
Overseas Workers Affairs	Bryan Revilla	Agimat	Arlyn Ayon	Swerte	35
People's Participation	Marcelino Teodoro	NUP	Eli San Fernando	Kamanggagawa	25
Population and Family Relations	Edwin Ongchuan	PFP	Jonathan Clement Abalos	4Ps	25
Poverty Alleviation	Gloria Macapagal Arroyo	Lakas	Jonathan Clement Abalos	4Ps	40
Public Accounts	Terry Ridon	Bicol Saro	Sheen Gonzales	NUP	45
Public Information	Lordan Suan	Lakas	Paolo Marcoleta	SAGIP	35
Public Order and Safety	Rolando Valeriano	NUP	Allan Ty	LPGMA	55
Public Works and Highways	Romeo Momo	Nacionalista	Terry Ridon	Bicol Saro	100
Revision of Laws	Dino Tanjuatco	NPC	Jonathan Clement Abalos	4Ps	25
Rules	Sandro Marcos	PFP	Marcelino Libanan	4Ps	30
Rural Development	Wilton Kho	Lakas	Eli San Fernando	Kamanggagawa	30
Science and Technology	Jules Ledesma	NPC	Roberto Nazal Jr.	BH	35
Senior Citizens	Milagros Magsaysay	United Senior Citizens	Arlyn Ayon	Swerte	25
Social Services	Cheeno Miguel Almario	Lakas	Jonathan Clement Abalos	4Ps	40
Suffrage and Electoral Reforms	Zia Alonto Adiong	Lakas	Jonathan Clement Abalos	4Ps	35
Sustainable Development Goals	Jose Manuel Alba	Lakas	Arlyn Ayon	Swerte	20
Tourism	Eleandro Jesus Madrona	Nacionalista	Arlyn Ayon	Swerte	75
Trade and Industry	Maximo Dalog	Nacionalista	Terry Ridon	Bicol Saro	60
Transportation	Franz Pumaren	NUP	Jonathan Clement Abalos	4Ps	85
Veterans Affairs and Welfare	Rudy Caoagdan	Nacionalista	Allan Ty	LPGMA	30
Visayas Development	Lolita Javier	Nacionalista	Sheen Gonzales	NUP	35
Ways and Means	Miro Quimbo	PFP	Terry Ridon	Bicol Saro	75
Welfare of Children	Richelle Singson-Michael	Ako Ilocano Ako	Renee Co	Kabataan	35
Women and Gender Equality	Ann Matibag	Lakas	Arlyn Ayon	Swerte	55
Youth and Sports Development	Mike Dy	Lakas	Renee Co	Kabataan	50

== Special committees ==
Committee	Chair	Party	Total members
ASEAN Affairs	Yedda Romualdez	Tingog	To be determined
Bases Conversion	Arthur Robes	Lakas	To be determined
Bicol Affairs and Economic Development	Leo Rodriguez	PFP	To be determined
Creative Industries	Javi Benitez	PFP	To be determined
East ASEAN Growth Area	Maximo Rodriguez Jr.	Abamin	To be determined
Food Security	Adrian Salceda	Lakas	To be determined
Globalization and WTO	Alexie Tutor	Lakas	To be determined
Land Use	Francisco Matugas	Lakas	To be determined
Nuclear Energy	Mark Cojuangco	NPC	To be determined
Peace, Reconciliation and Unity	Samier Tan	Lakas	To be determined
Persons with Disabilities	Alfel Bascug	NUP	To be determined
Reforestation	Bong Rivera	NPC	To be determined
Southern Tagalog Development	Loreto Amante	Lakas	To be determined
Strategic Intelligence	Alexander Pimentel	PFP	To be determined
West Philippine Sea	Maria Angela Garcia	NUP	To be determined

== Ad hoc committees ==
Committee	Chair	Total members
Agriculture Services Convergence Initiative	Vacant	To be determined
Marawi Rehabilitation and Victims Compensation	Vacant	To be determined
Military and Uniformed Personnel Pension System	Vacant	To be determined
Relocation of the House of Representatives Complex	Vacant	To be determined

== See also ==
- List of Philippine Senate committees
