= Philippine House Committee on Ecology =

Standing committee of the House of Representatives of the Philippines

Committee on Ecology
- 20th Congress

History
- New session started: July 28, 2025

Leadership
- Chair: Vacant since June 30, 2025
- Minority Leader: Vacant since June 30, 2025

Website
- Committee on Ecology

The Philippine House Committee on Ecology, or House Ecology Committee is a standing committee of the Philippine House of Representatives.

== Jurisdiction ==
As prescribed by House Rules, the committee's jurisdiction is on the ecosystem management including pollution control.

== Members, 20th Congress ==
As of June 30, 2025, all committee membership positions are vacant.

== Historical membership rosters ==
=== 18th Congress ===
Position	Members	Party	Province/City	District
Chairperson	Glona Labadlabad	PDP–Laban	Zamboanga del Norte	2nd
Vice Chairpersons	Jose Teves Jr.	TGP	Party-list	
Vice Chairpersons	Allen Jesse Mangaoang	Nacionalista	Kalinga	Lone
Vice Chairpersons	Luisa Lloren Cuaresma	NUP	Nueva Vizcaya	Lone
Members for the Majority	Rozzano Rufino Biazon	PDP–Laban	Muntinlupa	Lone
Members for the Majority	Jose Francisco Benitez	PDP–Laban	Negros Occidental	3rd
Members for the Majority	Junie Cua	PDP–Laban	Quirino	Lone
Members for the Majority	Frederick Siao	Nacionalista	Iligan	Lone
Members for the Majority	Ma. Lourdes Acosta-Alba	Bukidnon Paglaum	Bukidnon	1st
Members for the Majority	Cheryl Deloso-Montalla	Liberal	Zambales	2nd
Members for the Majority	Gil Acosta	PPP	Palawan	3rd
Members for the Majority	Ciriaco Gato Jr.	NPC	Batanes	Lone
Members for the Majority	Erico Aristotle Aumentado	NPC	Bohol	2nd
Members for the Majority	Solomon Chungalao	NPC	Ifugao	Lone
Members for the Majority	Jocelyn Limkaichong	Liberal	Negros Oriental	1st
Members for the Majority	Julienne Baronda	NUP	Iloilo City	Lone
Members for the Majority	Vincent Franco Frasco	Lakas	Cebu	5th
Members for the Majority	Ramon Nolasco Jr.	NUP	Cagayan	1st
Members for the Majority	Faustino Michael Dy V	NUP	Isabela	6th
Members for the Majority	Adolph Edward Plaza	NUP	Agusan del Sur	2nd
Members for the Majority	Jocelyn Fortuno	Nacionalista	Camarines Sur	5th
Members for the Majority	Datu Roonie Sinsuat Sr.	PDP–Laban	Maguindanao	1st
Members for the Majority	Romeo Jalosjos Jr.	Nacionalista	Zamboanga del Norte	1st
Members for the Majority	Enrico Pineda	1PACMAN	Party-list	
Members for the Majority	Allan Benedict Reyes	PFP	Quezon City	3rd
Members for the Majority	Leonardo Babasa Jr.	PDP–Laban	Zamboanga del Sur	2nd
Members for the Majority	Christian Unabia	Lakas	Misamis Oriental	1st
Members for the Majority	Jake Vincent Villa	NPC	Siquijor	Lone
Members for the Majority	Dahlia Loyola	NPC	Cavite	5th
Members for the Majority	Divina Grace Yu	PDP–Laban	Zamboanga del Sur	1st
Members for the Minority	Lawrence Lemuel Fortun	Nacionalista	Agusan del Norte	1st
Members for the Minority	Irene Gay Saulog	KALINGA	Party-list	
Members for the Minority	Eufemia Cullamat	Bayan Muna	Party-list	

== See also ==
- House of Representatives of the Philippines
- List of Philippine House of Representatives committees
