= Philippine House Committee on Suffrage and Electoral Reforms =

Standing committee of the House of Representatives of the Philippines

Committee on Suffrage and Electoral Reforms
- 20th Congress

History
- New session started: To convene on July 28, 2025

Leadership
- Chairman: Vacant
- Minority Leader: Vacant

Website
- Committee on Suffrage and Electoral Reforms

The Philippine House Committee on Suffrage and Electoral Reforms, or House Suffrage and Electoral Reforms Committee is a standing committee of the Philippine House of Representatives.

== Jurisdiction ==
As prescribed by House Rules, the committee's jurisdiction includes the following:

- Protection and advancement of the right of suffrage
- Conduct of elections, plebiscites, initiatives, recalls and referendums

== Members, 20th Congress ==
As of June 30, 2025, all committee membership positions are vacant until the House convenes for its first regular session on July 28.

== Historical membership rosters ==
=== 18th Congress ===
Position	Members	Party	Province/City	District
Chairperson	Juliet Marie Ferrer	NUP	Negros Occidental	4th
Vice Chairpersons	Virgilio Lacson	MANILA TEACHERS	Party-list	
Vice Chairpersons	Elpidio Barzaga Jr.	NUP	Cavite	4th
Vice Chairpersons	Henry Villarica	PDP–Laban	Bulacan	4th
Vice Chairpersons	Edgar Erice	Liberal	Caloocan	2nd
Members for the Majority	Pablo Ortega	NPC	La Union	1st
Members for the Majority	Francisco Jose Matugas II	PDP–Laban	Surigao del Norte	1st
Members for the Majority	Mohamad Khalid Dimaporo	PDP–Laban	Lanao del Norte	1st
Members for the Majority	Samier Tan	PDP–Laban	Sulu	1st
Members for the Majority	Josefina Tallado	PDP–Laban	Camarines Norte	1st
Members for the Majority	Marisol Panotes	PDP–Laban	Camarines Norte	2nd
Members for the Majority	Cyrille Abueg-Zaldivar	PPP	Palawan	2nd
Members for the Majority	Maria Fe Abunda	PDP–Laban	Eastern Samar	Lone
Members for the Majority	Ma. Angelica Amante-Matba	PDP–Laban	Agusan del Norte	2nd
Members for the Majority	Alyssa Sheena Tan	PFP	Isabela	4th
Members for the Majority	Vicente Veloso III	NUP	Leyte	3rd
Members for the Majority	Luisa Lloren Cuaresma	NUP	Nueva Vizcaya	Lone
Members for the Majority	Rufus Rodriguez	CDP	Cagayan de Oro	2nd
Members for the Majority	Allan Ty	LPGMA	Party-list	
Members for the Majority	Rodolfo Ordanes	SENIOR CITIZENS	Party-list	
Members for the Minority	Lawrence Lemuel Fortun	Nacionalista	Agusan del Norte	1st
Members for the Minority	Ferdinand Gaite	Bayan Muna	Party-list	

==== Member for the Majority ====
- Francisco Datol Jr. (Note: Died on August 10, 2020.) (SENIOR CITIZENS)

== See also ==
- House of Representatives of the Philippines
- List of Philippine House of Representatives committees
- Commission on Elections
- Elections in the Philippines
