= Philippine House Committee on Rural Development =

Standing committee of the House of Representatives of the Philippines

Committee on Rural Development
- 20th Congress

History
- New session started: To convene on July 28, 2025

Leadership
- Chairman: Vacant
- Minority Leader: Vacant

Website
- Committee on Rural Development

The Philippine House Committee on Rural Development, or House Rural Development Committee is a standing committee of the Philippine House of Representatives.

== Jurisdiction ==
As prescribed by House Rules, the committee's jurisdiction is on the development of rural areas and islands through policies, programs, support services and other interventions which includes the following:

- Access to rural projects funding and financing
- Area development planning
- Community mobilization and development
- Livelihood and enterprise development
- Microfinancing

== Members, 20th Congress ==
As of June 30, 2025, all committee membership positions are vacant until the House convenes for its first regular session on July 28.

== Historical membership rosters ==
=== 18th Congress ===
Position	Members	Party	Province/City	District
Chairperson	Elisa Kho	PDP–Laban	Masbate	1st
Vice Chairpersons	Alfred Delos Santos	ANG PROBINSYANO	Party-list	
Vice Chairpersons	Ronnie Ong	ANG PROBINSYANO	Party-list	
Vice Chairpersons	Fernando Cabredo	PDP–Laban	Albay	3rd
Members for the Majority	Leonardo Babasa Jr.	PDP–Laban	Zamboanga del Sur	2nd
Members for the Majority	Divina Grace Yu	PDP–Laban	Zamboanga del Sur	1st
Members for the Majority	Antonino Calixto	PDP–Laban	Pasay	Lone
Members for the Majority	Carl Nicolas Cari	PFP	Leyte	5th
Members for the Majority	Lorenz Defensor	PDP–Laban	Iloilo	3rd
Members for the Majority	Alan Dujali	PDP–Laban	Davao del Norte	2nd
Members for the Majority	Alan Ecleo	PDP–Laban	Dinagat Islands	Lone
Members for the Majority	Gerardo Espina Jr.	Lakas	Biliran	Lone
Members for the Majority	Ciriaco Gato Jr.	NPC	Batanes	Lone
Members for the Majority	Allen Jesse Mangaoang	Nacionalista	Kalinga	Lone
Members for the Majority	Maximo Dalog Jr.	Nacionalista	Mountain Province	Lone
Members for the Majority	Rudys Caesar Fariñas I	Probinsyano Ako	Party-list	
Members for the Majority	Juliette Uy	NUP	Misamis Oriental	2nd
Members for the Majority	Romeo Jalosjos Jr.	Nacionalista	Zamboanga del Norte	1st
Members for the Majority	Narciso Bravo Jr.	NUP	Masbate	1st
Members for the Majority	Edgar Mary Sarmiento	NUP	Samar	1st
Members for the Minority	Sergio Dagooc	APEC	Party-list	
Members for the Minority	Eufemia Cullamat	Bayan Muna	Party-list	
Members for the Minority	Godofredo Guya	RECOBODA	Party-list	

== See also ==
- House of Representatives of the Philippines
- List of Philippine House of Representatives committees
