= Philippine House Committee on Local Government =

Standing committee of the House of Representatives of the Philippines

Committee on Local Government
- 20th Congress

Leadership
- Chairperson: Florencio Miraflores (NPC) since July 30, 2025
- Minority Leader: Marcelino Libanan (4Ps) since July 25, 2022

Website
- Committee on Local Government

The Philippine House Committee on Local Government, or House Local Government Committee is a standing committee of the Philippine House of Representatives.

== Jurisdiction ==
As prescribed by House Rules, the committee's jurisdiction includes the following:

- Autonomous regions
- Barangays
- Municipalities
- Cities
- Provinces
- Revenues and expenditures of the said subdivisions

== Members, 20th Congress ==
As of June 30, 2025, all committee membership positions are vacant until the House convenes for its first regular session on July 28.

== Historical membership rosters ==
=== 19th Congress ===
Position	Members	Party	Province/City	District
Chairperson	Noel Villanueva	NPC	Tarlac	3rd
Vice Chairpersons	Adolph Edward Plaza	NUP	Agusan del Sur	2nd
Vice Chairpersons	Faustino Dy V	NUP	Isabela	6th
Vice Chairpersons	Eugenio Angelo Barba	Nacionalista	Ilocos Norte	2nd
Vice Chairpersons	Esmael Mangudadatu	PDP–Laban	Maguindanao	2nd
Vice Chairpersons	Datu Roonie Sinsuat Sr.	PDP–Laban	Maguindanao	1st
Vice Chairpersons	Jose Teves Jr.	TGP	Party-list	
Vice Chairpersons	Leonardo Babasa Jr.	PDP–Laban	Zamboanga del Sur	2nd
Vice Chairpersons	Luis Campos Jr.	NPC	Makati	2nd
Members for the Majority	Luisa Lloren Cuaresma	NUP	Nueva Vizcaya	Lone
Members for the Majority	Wilfredo Caminero	NUP	Cebu	2nd
Members for the Majority	Strike Revilla	NUP	Cavite	2nd
Members for the Majority	Diego Ty	NUP	Misamis Occidental	1st
Members for the Majority	Juliette Uy	NUP	Misamis Oriental	2nd
Members for the Majority	Vicente Veloso III	NUP	Leyte	3rd
Members for the Majority	Frederick Siao	Nacionalista	Iligan	Lone
Members for the Majority	Ansaruddin Abdul Malik Adiong	Nacionalista	Lanao del Sur	1st
Members for the Majority	David Suarez	Nacionalista	Quezon	2nd
Members for the Majority	Maximo Dalog Jr.	Nacionalista	Mountain Province	Lone
Members for the Majority	Jeffrey Khonghun	Nacionalista	Zambales	1st
Members for the Majority	Carlo Lisandro Gonzalez	MARINO	Party-list	
Members for the Majority	Elisa Kho	PDP–Laban	Masbate	2nd
Members for the Majority	Ma. Angelica Amante-Matba	PDP–Laban	Agusan del Norte	2nd
Members for the Majority	Jesus Manuel Suntay	PDP–Laban	Quezon City	4th
Members for the Majority	Antonino Calixto	PDP–Laban	Pasay	Lone
Members for the Majority	Rozzano Rufino Biazon	PDP–Laban	Muntinlupa	Lone
Members for the Majority	Dulce Ann Hofer	PDP–Laban	Zamboanga Sibugay	2nd
Members for the Majority	Dale Malapitan	PDP–Laban	Caloocan	1st
Members for the Majority	Ramon Nolasco Jr.	NUP	Cagayan	1st
Members for the Majority	Mohamad Khalid Dimaporo	PDP–Laban	Lanao del Norte	1st
Members for the Majority	Jose Enrique Garcia III	NUP	Bataan	2nd
Members for the Majority	Juan Fidel Felipe Nograles	Lakas	Rizal	2nd
Members for the Majority	Solomon Chungalao	NPC	Ifugao	Lone
Members for the Majority	Arnulf Bryan Fuentebella	NPC	Camarines Sur	4th
Members for the Majority	Greg Gasataya	NPC	Bacolod	Lone
Members for the Majority	Dahlia Loyola	NPC	Cavite	5th
Members for the Majority	Elias Bulut Jr.	NPC	Apayao	Lone
Members for the Majority	Manuel Sagarbarria	NPC	Negros Oriental	2nd
Members for the Majority	Gerardo Valmayor Jr.	NPC	Negros Occidental	1st
Members for the Majority	Michael John Duavit	NPC	Rizal	1st
Members for the Majority	Teodorico Haresco Jr.	Nacionalista	Aklan	2nd
Members for the Majority	Ma. Laarni Cayetano	Nacionalista	Taguig	2nd
Members for the Majority	Manuel Cabochan	MAGDALO	Party-list	
Members for the Majority	Hector Sanchez	Lakas	Catanduanes	Lone
Members for the Majority	Alfred Delos Santos	ANG PROBINSYANO	Party-list	
Members for the Majority	Divina Grace Yu	PDP–Laban	Zamboanga del Sur	1st
Members for the Minority	Isagani Amatong	Liberal	Zamboanga del Norte	3rd
Members for the Minority	Angelica Natasha Co	BHW	Party-list	
Members for the Minority	Ferdinand Gaite	Bayan Muna	Party-list	
Members for the Minority	Sarah Jane Elago	Kabataan	Party-list	

==== Vice Chairperson ====
- Francisco Datol Jr. (Note: Died on August 10, 2020.) (SENIOR CITIZENS)

==== Member for the Majority ====
- Nestor Fongwan (Note: Died on December 18, 2019.) (Benguet–Lone, PDP–Laban)

== See also ==
- House of Representatives of the Philippines
- List of Philippine House of Representatives committees
- Department of the Interior and Local Government
