= Philippine House Committee on Foreign Affairs =

Standing committee of the House of Representatives of the Philippines

Committee on Foreign Affairs
- 20th Congress

History
- New session started: July 28, 2025

Leadership
- Chair: Maria Rachel Arenas, Lakas since July 30, 2025
- Minority Leader: Vacant since June 30, 2025

Website
- Committee on Foreign Affairs

The Philippine House Committee on Foreign Affairs, or House Foreign Affairs Committee is a standing committee of the Philippine House of Representatives.

== Jurisdiction ==
As prescribed by House Rules, the committee's jurisdiction includes the following:

- Diplomatic and consular services
- Other international organizations and agencies
- Relations of the Philippines with other countries
- United Nations and its agencies

== Members, 20th Congress ==
Position	Member	Constituency	Party
Chairperson	Maria Rachel Arenas	Pangasinan–3rd	Lakas
Vice Chairpersons	Vacant		
Members for the Majority	Vacant		
Members for the Minority	Vacant		

== Historical membership rosters ==
=== 18th Congress ===
Position	Members	Party	Province/City	District
Chairperson	Dulce Ann Hofer	PDP–Laban	Zamboanga Sibugay	2nd
Vice Chairpersons	Ma. Laarni Cayetano	Nacionalista	Taguig	2nd
Vice Chairpersons	Manuel Sagarbarria	NPC	Negros Oriental	2nd
Vice Chairpersons	Domingo Rivera	CIBAC	Party-list	
Vice Chairpersons	Samantha Louise Vargas-Alfonso	NUP	Cagayan	2nd
Vice Chairpersons	Cyrille Abueg-Zaldivar	PPP	Palawan	2nd
Vice Chairpersons	Ronnie Ong	ANG PROBINSYANO	Party-list	
Members for the Majority	Ed Christopher Go	Nacionalista	Isabela	2nd
Members for the Majority	Vincent Franco Frasco	Lakas	Cebu	5th
Members for the Majority	Julienne Baronda	NUP	Iloilo City	Lone
Members for the Majority	Juliet Marie Ferrer	NUP	Negros Occidental	4th
Members for the Majority	Marisol Panotes	PDP–Laban	Camarines Norte	2nd
Members for the Majority	Ciriaco Gato Jr.	NPC	Batanes	Lone
Members for the Majority	Erico Aristotle Aumentado	NPC	Bohol	2nd
Members for the Majority	Ian Paul Dy	NPC	Isabela	3rd
Members for the Majority	Abdullah Dimaporo	NPC	Lanao del Norte	2nd
Members for the Majority	Weslie Gatchalian	NPC	Valenzuela	1st
Members for the Majority	Cesar Jimenez Jr.	PDP–Laban	Zamboanga City	1st
Members for the Majority	Lucy Torres-Gomez	PDP–Laban	Leyte	4th
Members for the Majority	Estrellita Suansing	PDP–Laban	Nueva Ecija	1st
Members for the Majority	Kristine Alexie Besas-Tutor	Nacionalista	Bohol	3rd
Members for the Majority	Camille Villar	Nacionalista	Las Piñas	Lone
Members for the Majority	Sol Aragones	Nacionalista	Laguna	3rd
Members for the Majority	Rosanna Vergara	PDP–Laban	Nueva Ecija	3rd
Members for the Majority	Antonio Albano	NUP	Isabela	1st
Members for the Majority	Jocelyn Tulfo	ACT-CIS	Party-list	
Members for the Majority	Lorna Silverio	NUP	Bulacan	3rd
Members for the Majority	Florida Robes	NUP	San Jose del Monte	Lone
Members for the Majority	Enrico Pineda	1PACMAN	Party-list	
Members for the Majority	Rufus Rodriguez	CDP	Cagayan de Oro	2nd
Members for the Majority	Alberto Pacquiao	OFWFC	Party-list	
Members for the Majority	Elizalde Co	AKO BICOL	Party-list	
Members for the Majority	Juliette Uy	NUP	Misamis Oriental	2nd
Members for the Majority	Micaela Violago	NUP	Nueva Ecija	2nd
Members for the Majority	Ma. Lourdes Acosta-Alba	Bukidnon Paglaum	Bukidnon	1st
Members for the Majority	Glona Labadlabad	PDP–Laban	Zamboanga del Norte	2nd
Members for the Majority	Emmarie Ouano-Dizon	PDP–Laban	Cebu	6th
Members for the Majority	Ma. Lucille Nava	PDP–Laban	Guimaras	Lone
Members for the Majority	Cheryl Deloso-Montalla	Liberal	Zambales	2nd
Members for the Majority	Eric Yap	ACT-CIS	Party-list	
Members for the Majority	Shernee Tan	Kusug Tausug	Party-list	
Members for the Majority	Ducielle Marie Cardema	Duterte Youth	Party-list	
Members for the Minority	Arlene Brosas	GABRIELA	Party-list	
Members for the Minority	Arnolfo Teves Jr.	PDP–Laban	Negros Oriental	3rd
Members for the Minority	Sergio Dagooc	APEC	Party-list	
Members for the Minority	Argel Joseph Cabatbat	MAGSASAKA	Party-list	

==== Vice Chairperson ====
- Francisco Datol Jr. (Note: Died on August 10, 2020.) (SENIOR CITIZENS)

== See also ==
- House of Representatives of the Philippines
- List of Philippine House of Representatives committees
- Department of Foreign Affairs
- Foreign relations of the Philippines
