= Philippine House Committee on Agrarian Reform =

Standing committee of the House of Representatives of the Philippines

Committee on Agrarian Reform
- House of Representatives of the Philippines; 20th Congress

History
- New session started: July 28, 2025

Leadership
- Chair: Eleanor Begtang (NPC) since August 4, 2025
- Senior minority member: Eli San Fernando (Kamanggagawa) since August 12, 2025

Structure
- Seats: 40
- Political groups: Majority (25): Lakas (9); PFP (5); NPC (4); Party-lists (4); NUP (2); Nacionalista (1); Minority (2): Party-lists (2); Vacant (13): Vacant (Note: Unfilled seats) (13)

Website
- Committee on Agrarian Reform

The Philippine House Committee on Agrarian Reform, or House Agrarian Reform Committee is a standing committee of the House of Representatives of the Philippines.

== Jurisdiction ==
As prescribed by House Rules, the committee's jurisdiction includes the following:

- Agrarian reform
- Implementation and amendment of the Comprehensive Agrarian Reform Program
- Resettlement of and other support services for agrarian reform beneficiaries

== Senate counterpart ==
The jurisdiction of the House Committee on Agrarian Reform has a counterpart in the Senate:

- Senate Committee on Agriculture, Food and Agrarian Reform

== Members, 20th Congress ==
Since August 4, 2025
Majority	Minority
Eleanor Begtang (Apayao at-large, NPC), Chair	Eli San Fernando (Kamanggagawa, Party-list)
Rosalie Salvame (Palawan–1st, NUP), Vice Chair	Sarah Elago (Gabriela, Party-list)
Imelda Dimaporo (Lanao del Norte–1st, PFP), Vice Chair	
Sonny Lagon (Ako Bisaya, Party-list), Vice Chair	
Doris Maniquiz (Zambales–2nd, Lakas), Vice Chair	
Dino Yulo (Negros Occidental–5th, Lakas), Vice Chair	
Ruth Sakaluran (Sultan Kudarat–1st, Lakas), Vice Chair	
Felimon Espares (Coop-NATCCO, Party-list), Vice Chair	
Esmael Mangudadatu (Maguindanao del Sur at-large, PFP)	
Keith Micah Tan (Quezon–4th, NPC)	
Dino Tanjuatco (Rizal–2nd, NPC)	
Florencio Miraflores (Aklan–2nd, NPC)	
Ferdinand Beltran (MAGBUBUKID, Party-list)	
Girlie Veloso (Malasakit@Bayanihan, Party-list)	
Samier Tan (Sulu–1st, Lakas)	
Dante Garcia (La Union–2nd, Lakas)	
Salvador Pleyto (Bulacan–6th, PFP)	
Antonio Kho (Masbate–1st, Lakas)	
Janice Degamo (Negros Oriental–3rd, Lakas)	
Angelo Barba (Ilocos Norte–2nd, Nacionalista)	
Caroline Agyao (Kalinga at-large, PFP)	
Dale Corvera (Agusan del Norte at-large, PFP)	
Christopherson Yap (Southern Leyte–2nd, Lakas)	
Mica Gonzales (Pampanga–3rd, Lakas)	
Jerry Perez (Zamboanga City–2nd, NUP)	

== Historical membership rosters ==
=== 18th Congress ===
September 30, 2019 – June 30, 2022
Majority	Minority
Solomon Chungalao (Ifugao at-large, NPC), Chair	Argel Joseph Cabatbat (Magsasaka, Party-list)
Gerardo Espina Jr. (Biliran at-large, Lakas), Vice Chair	Lawrence Fortun (Agusan del Norte–1st, Nacionalista)
Datu Roonie Sinsuat Sr. (Maguindanao–1st, UBJP), Vice Chair	Eufemia Cullamat (Bayan Muna, Party-list)
Tyrone Agabas (Pangasinan–6th, NPC), Vice Chair	Isagani Amatong (Zamboanga del Norte–3rd, Liberal)
Maricel Natividad-Nagaño (Nueva Ecija–4th, Unang Sigaw), Vice Chair	
Abdullah Dimaporo (Lanao del Norte–2nd, NPC)	
Mark Enverga (Quezon–1st, NPC)	
Noel Villanueva (Tarlac–3rd, NPC)	
Gil Acosta Jr. (Palawan–3rd, PPPL)	
Anna Suarez (ALONA, Party-list)	
Alfredo Garbin (Ako Bicol, Party-list)	
Zaldy Co (Ako Bicol, Party-list)	
Aleta Suarez (Quezon–3rd, Lakas)	
Geraldine Roman (Bataan–1st, Lakas)	
Angelica Amante (Agusan del Norte–2nd, PDP–Laban)	

==== Vice Chairperson ====
- Nestor Fongwan (Note: Died on December 18, 2019.) (Benguet at-large, PDP–Laban)

==== Member for the Majority ====
- Rodolfo Albano Jr. (Note: Died on November 5, 2019.) (LPGMA, Party-list)

== See also ==
- House of Representatives of the Philippines
- List of Philippine House of Representatives committees
- Department of Agrarian Reform
- Comprehensive Agrarian Reform Program
