= Philippine House Committee on Labor and Employment =

Standing committee of the House of Representatives of the Philippines

Committee on Labor and Employment
- 20th Congress

History
- New session started: To convene on July 28, 2025

Leadership
- Chairman: Vacant
- Minority Leader: Vacant

Website
- Committee on Labor and Employment

The Philippine House Committee on Labor and Employment, or House Labor and Employment Committee is a standing committee of the Philippine House of Representatives.

== Jurisdiction ==
As prescribed by House Rules, the committee's jurisdiction includes the following:

- Advancement and protection of the rights and welfare of worker
- Employment and manpower development inclusive of the promotion of industrial peace and employer-employee cooperation
- Labor education
- Labor standards and statistics
- Organization and development of the labor market including the recruitment, training and placement of manpower

== Members, 20th Congress ==
As of June 30, 2025, all committee membership positions are vacant until the House convenes for its first regular session on July 28.

== Historical membership rosters ==
=== 18th Congress ===
Position	Members	Party	Province/City	District
Chairperson	Enrico Pineda	1PACMAN	Party-list	
Vice Chairpersons	Michael Edgar Aglipay	DIWA	Party-list	
Vice Chairpersons	Raymond Democrito Mendoza	TUCP	Party-list	
Vice Chairpersons	Mark Go	Nacionalista	Baguio	Lone
Vice Chairpersons	Henry Villarica	PDP–Laban	Bulacan	4th
Vice Chairpersons	Ma. Fe Abunda	PDP–Laban	Eastern Samar	Lone
Vice Chairpersons	Ma. Theresa Collantes	PDP–Laban	Batangas	3rd
Members for the Majority	Horacio Suansing Jr.	NUP	Sultan Kudarat	2nd
Members for the Majority	Joy Myra Tambunting	NUP	Parañaque	2nd
Members for the Majority	Ed Christopher Go	Nacionalista	Isabela	2nd
Members for the Majority	Diego Ty	NUP	Misamis Occidental	1st
Members for the Majority	Corazon Nuñez-Malanyaon	Nacionalista	Davao Oriental	1st
Members for the Majority	Josefina Tallado	PDP–Laban	Camarines Norte	1st
Members for the Majority	Joey Salceda	PDP–Laban	Albay	2nd
Members for the Majority	Ruth Mariano-Hernandez	Independent	Laguna	2nd
Members for the Majority	Marisol Panotes	PDP–Laban	Camarines Norte	2nd
Members for the Majority	Cyrille Abueg-Zaldivar	PPP	Palawan	2nd
Members for the Majority	Ma. Angelica Amante-Matba	PDP–Laban	Agusan del Norte	2nd
Members for the Majority	Leonardo Babasa Jr.	PDP–Laban	Zamboanga del Sur	2nd
Members for the Majority	Francisco Benitez	PDP–Laban	Negros Occidental	3rd
Members for the Majority	Fernando Cabredo	PDP–Laban	Albay	3rd
Members for the Majority	Antonino Calixto	PDP–Laban	Pasay	Lone
Members for the Majority	Carl Nicolas Cari	PFP	Leyte	5th
Members for the Majority	Rowena Niña Taduran	ACT-CIS	Party-list	
Members for the Majority	Jose Gay Padiernos	GP	Party-list	
Members for the Majority	Edcel Lagman	Liberal	Albay	1st
Members for the Majority	Alfredo Garbin Jr.	AKO BICOL	Party-list	
Members for the Majority	Cheryl Deloso-Montalla	Liberal	Zambales	2nd
Members for the Majority	Dahlia Loyola	NPC	Cavite	5th
Members for the Majority	Manuel Luis Lopez	NPC	Manila	1st
Members for the Majority	Elizalde Co	AKO BICOL	Party-list	
Members for the Majority	Virgilio Lacson	MANILA TEACHERS	Party-list	
Members for the Majority	Datu Roonie Sinsuat Sr.	PDP–Laban	Maguindanao	1st
Members for the Majority	Macnell Lusotan	MARINO	Party-list	
Members for the Majority	Allan Ty	LPGMA	Party-list	
Members for the Majority	Romeo Momo Sr.	CWS	Party-list	
Members for the Minority	Ferdinand Gaite	Bayan Muna	Party-list	
Members for the Minority	Lawrence Lemuel Fortun	Nacionalista	Agusan del Norte	1st
Members for the Minority	Alex Advincula	NUP	Cavite	3rd

==== Vice Chairperson ====
- Rodolfo Albano (Note: Died on November 5, 2019.) (LPGMA)

==== Member for the Majority ====
- Francisco Datol Jr. (Note: Died on August 10, 2020.) (SENIOR CITIZENS)

== See also ==
- House of Representatives of the Philippines
- List of Philippine House of Representatives committees
- Labor Code of the Philippines
- Department of Labor and Employment
