= Philippine House Committee on Population and Family Relations =

Standing committee of the House of Representatives of the Philippines

Committee on Population and Family Relations
- 20th Congress

History
- New session started: To convene on July 28, 2025

Leadership
- Chairman: Vacant
- Minority Leader: Vacant

Website
- Committee on Population and Family Relations

The Philippine House Committee on Population and Family Relations, or House Population and Family Relations Committee is a standing committee of the Philippine House of Representatives.

== Jurisdiction ==
As prescribed by House Rules, the committee's jurisdiction includes the following:

- Family relations
- Population census and statistics
- Population growth and family planning

== Members, 20th Congress ==
As of June 30, 2025, all committee membership positions are vacant until the House convenes for its first regular session on July 28.

== Historical membership rosters ==
=== 18th Congress ===
| Position | Members | Party | Province/City | District |
|---|---|---|---|---|
| Chairperson | Ma. Lucille Nava | PDP–Laban | Guimaras | Lone |
| Vice Chairpersons | Marisol Panotes | PDP–Laban | Camarines Norte | 2nd |
| Vice Chairpersons | Shirlyn Bañas-Nograles | PDP–Laban | South Cotabato | 1st |
| Members for the Majority | Juliet Marie Ferrer | NUP | Negros Occidental | 4th |
| Members for the Majority | Diego Ty | NUP | Misamis Occidental | 1st |
| Members for the Majority | Antonino Calixto | PDP–Laban | Pasay | Lone |
| Members for the Majority | Carl Nicolas Cari | PFP | Leyte | 5th |
| Members for the Majority | Lorenz Defensor | PDP–Laban | Iloilo | 3rd |
| Members for the Majority | Alan Dujali | PDP–Laban | Davao del Norte | 2nd |
| Members for the Majority | Alan 1 Ecleo | PDP–Laban | Dinagat Islands | Lone |
| Members for the Majority | Gerardo Espina Jr. | Lakas–CMD | Biliran | Lone |
| Members for the Majority | Ma. Lourdes Acosta-Alba | Bukidnon Paglaum | Bukidnon | 1st |
| Members for the Majority | Edcel Lagman | Liberal | Albay | 1st |
| Members for the Majority | Divina Grace Yu | PDP–Laban | Zamboanga del Sur | 1st |
| Members for the Majority | Ruth Mariano-Hernandez | Independent | Laguna | 2nd |
| Members for the Minority | Arlene Brosas | GABRIELA | Party-list | |
| Members for the Minority | Ma. Victoria A. Umali | A TEACHER | Party-list | |

== See also ==
- House of Representatives of the Philippines
- List of Philippine House of Representatives committees
