= Philippine House Committee on People Participation =

Standing committee of the House of Representatives of the Philippines

Committee on People Participation
- 20th Congress

History
- New session started: To convene on July 28, 2025

Leadership
- Chairman: Vacant
- Minority Leader: Vacant

Website
- Committee on People Participation

The Philippine House Committee on People Participation, or House People Participation Committee is a standing committee of the Philippine House of Representatives.

== Jurisdiction ==
As prescribed by House Rules, the committee's jurisdiction includes the following:

- Role, rights and responsibilities of people's organizations, non-government and civic organizations, and other similar groups
- Establishment of mechanisms for consultation with and participation of the people in governance and in legislation including the establishment and maintenance of a data bank on all such organizations

== Members, 20th Congress ==
As of June 30, 2025, all committee membership positions are vacant until the House convenes for its first regular session on July 28.

== Historical membership rosters ==
=== 18th Congress ===
| Position | Members | Party | Province/City | District |
|---|---|---|---|---|
| Chairperson | Florida Robes | NUP | San Jose del Monte | Lone |
| Vice Chairpersons | Juliette Uy | NUP | Misamis Oriental | 2nd |
| Vice Chairpersons | Shirlyn Bañas-Nograles | PDP–Laban | South Cotabato | 1st |
| Members for the Majority | Rosanna Vergara | PDP–Laban | Nueva Ecija | 3rd |
| Members for the Majority | Sandra Eriguel | NUP | La Union | 2nd |
| Members for the Majority | Elisa Kho | PDP–Laban | Masbate | 2nd |
| Members for the Majority | Carl Nicolas Cari | PFP | Leyte | 5th |
| Members for the Majority | Glona Labadlabad | PDP–Laban | Zamboanga del Norte | 2nd |
| Members for the Majority | Yasser Balindong | Lakas | Lanao del Sur | 2nd |
| Members for the Majority | Solomon Chungalao | NPC | Ifugao | Lone |
| Members for the Majority | Precious Castelo | NPC | Quezon City | 2nd |
| Members for the Majority | Faustino Michael Dy V | NUP | Isabela | 6th |
| Members for the Majority | Jose Antonio Sy-Alvarado | NUP | Bulacan | 1st |
| Members for the Majority | Gavini Pancho | NUP | Bulacan | 2nd |
| Members for the Majority | Ma. Lourdes Acosta-Alba | Bukidnon Paglaum | Bukidnon | 1st |
| Members for the Majority | Macnell Lusotan | MARINO | Party-list | |
| Members for the Minority | Gabriel Bordado Jr. | Liberal | Camarines Sur | 3rd |
| Members for the Minority | Eufemia Cullamat | Bayan Muna | Party-list | |

== See also ==
- House of Representatives of the Philippines
- List of Philippine House of Representatives committees
