= Philippine House Special Committee on West Philippine Sea =

Special committee of the House of Representatives of the Philippines

Special Committee on West Philippine Sea
- 20th Congress

History
- New session started: July 28, 2025

Leadership
- Chairman: Antolin Oreta III (NUP) since February 11, 2026
- Sr. Vice-Chairman: Richard Gomez (PFP) since August 12, 2025

Website
- Special Committee on West Philippine Sea

The Philippine House Special Committee on West Philippine Sea is a special committee of the Philippine House of Representatives.

== Jurisdiction ==
As prescribed by House Rules, the committee's jurisdiction is on the South China Sea issues which includes the following:

- Joint cooperation arrangements
- Maritime and environmental concerns
- National and regional peace and security issues
- Territorial and boundary disputes

The committee is named after "West Philippine Sea", a designation by the Philippine government on portions of the South China Sea.

== Members, 20th Congress ==
Position	Member	Party	Constituency
Chairperson	Antolin Oreta III	NUP	Malabon's at-large
Senior Vice Chairperson	Richard Gomez	PFP	Leyte's 4th
Vice Chairperson	Doris Maniquiz	Lakas–CMD	Zambales's 2nd
Vice Chairperson	Ziaur-Rahman Alonto Adiong	Lakas–CMD	Lanao del Sur's 1st
Members for the Majority	Arnan Panaligan	Lakas–CMD	Oriental Mindoro's 1st
Members for the Majority	Ed Christopher Go	PFP	Isabela's 2nd
Members for the Majority	Jose Manuel Alba	NUP	Bukidnon's 1st
Members for the Majority	Maria Rachel Arenas	Lakas–CMD	Pangasinan's 3rd
Members for the Majority	Marlyn Primicias-Agabas	Lakas–CMD	Pangasinan's 6th
Members for the Majority	Binky April Tupas	Lakas–CMD	Iloilo's 5th
Members for the Majority	Jose Alvarez	NPC	Palawan's 2nd
Members for the Majority	Ronald Singson	NPC	Ilocos Sur's 1st
Members for the Majority	Albert Garcia	NUP	Bataan's 2nd
Members for the Majority	Anna Victoria Veloso-Tuazon	NUP	Leyte's 3rd
Members for the Majority	Leody Tarriela	PFP	Occidental Mindoro's at-large
Members for the Majority	Eugenio Angelo Marcos Barba	Nacionalista	Ilocos Norte's 2nd
Members for the Majority	Franz Vincent Legazpi (Note: Resigned on May 18, 2026.)	Pinoy Workers	Party-list
Members for the Majority	Florabel Yatco	Nanay	Party-list
Members for the Minority	Allan Ty	LPGMA	Party-list
Members for the Minority	Jose Manuel Tadeo Diokno	Akbayan	Party-list

== Historical membership rosters ==
=== 18th Congress ===
Position	Members	Party	Constituency
Chairperson	Manuel Sagarbarria	NPC	Negros Oriental
Vice Chairpersons	Cyrille Abueg-Zaldivar	Liberal	Palawan
Vice Chairpersons	Gil Acosta	PPP	Palawan
Vice Chairpersons	Franz Alvarez	NUP	Palawan
Members for the Majority	Vicente Veloso III	NPC	Leyte
Members for the Majority	Jose Ong Jr.	NUP	Northern Samar
Members for the Majority	Dulce Ann Hofer	PDP–Laban	Zamboanga Sibugay
Members for the Majority	Ed Christopher Go	Nacionalista	Isabela
Members for the Majority	Macnell Lusotan	MARINO	Party-list
Members for the Minority	Lawrence Lemuel Fortun	Nacionalista	Agusan del Norte
Members for the Minority	Carlos Isagani Zarate	Bayan Muna	Party-list

== See also ==
- House of Representatives of the Philippines
- List of Philippine House of Representatives committees
- Territorial disputes in the South China Sea
