= Philippine House Committee on Inter-Parliamentary Relations and Diplomacy =

Standing committee of the House of Representatives of the Philippines

Committee on Inter-Parliamentary Relations and Diplomacy
- 20th Congress

History
- New session started: To convene on July 28, 2025

Leadership
- Chairman: Vacant
- Minority Leader: Vacant

Website
- Committee on Inter-Parliamentary Relations and Diplomacy

The Philippine House Committee on Inter-Parliamentary Relations and Diplomacy, or House Inter-Parliamentary Relations and Diplomacy Committee is a standing committee of the Philippine House of Representatives.

== Jurisdiction ==
As prescribed by House Rules, the committee's jurisdiction includes the following:

- Establishment of inter-parliamentary friendship societies
- Inter-parliamentary relations and linkages with international parliamentary organizations such as but not limited to:
  - ASEAN Inter-Parliamentary Assembly (AIPA)
  - Asian-Pacific Parliamentarians' Union (APPU)
  - Asian Parliamentary Assembly (APA)
  - Inter-Parliamentary Union (IPU)
- Visits of parliamentary delegations as well as other foreign dignitaries

== Members, 20th Congress ==
As of June 30, 2025, all committee membership positions are vacant until the House convenes for its first regular session on July 28.

== Historical membership rosters ==
=== 18th Congress ===
Position	Members	Party	Province/City	District
Chairperson	Sandra Eriguel	NUP	La Union	2nd
Vice Chairpersons	Samantha Louise Vargas-Alfonso	NUP	Cagayan	2nd
Vice Chairpersons	Juliet Marie Ferrer	NUP	Negros Occidental	4th
Vice Chairpersons	Ma. Theresa Collantes	PDP–Laban	Batangas	3rd
Vice Chairpersons	Precious Castelo	NPC	Quezon City	2nd
Vice Chairpersons	Rogelio Neil Roque	Nacionalista	Bukidnon	4th
Vice Chairpersons	Dulce Ann Hofer	PDP–Laban	Zamboanga Sibugay	2nd
Members for the Majority	Michael John Duavit	NPC	Rizal	1st
Members for the Majority	Wilfrido Mark Enverga	NPC	Quezon	1st
Members for the Majority	Carlos Cojuangco	NPC	Tarlac	1st
Members for the Majority	Manuel Luis Lopez	NPC	Manila	1st
Members for the Majority	Erico Aristotle Aumentado	NPC	Bohol	2nd
Members for the Majority	Weslie Gatchalian	NPC	Valenzuela	1st
Members for the Majority	Resurreccion Acop	NUP	Antipolo	2nd
Members for the Majority	Juliette Uy	NUP	Misamis Oriental	2nd
Members for the Majority	Jose Antonio Sy-Alvarado	NUP	Bulacan	1st
Members for the Majority	Anthony Peter Crisologo	NUP	Quezon City	1st
Members for the Majority	Micaela Violago	NUP	Nueva Ecija	2nd
Members for the Majority	Camille Villar	Nacionalista	Las Piñas	Lone
Members for the Majority	Antonio Albano	NUP	Isabela	1st
Members for the Majority	Jocelyn Tulfo	ACT-CIS	Party-list	
Members for the Majority	Lorna Silverio	NUP	Bulacan	3rd
Members for the Majority	Florida Robes	NUP	San Jose del Monte	Lone
Members for the Majority	Princess Rihan Sakaluran	NUP	Sultan Kudarat	1st
Members for the Majority	Solomon Chungalao	NPC	Ifugao	Lone
Members for the Majority	Wilton Kho	PDP–Laban	Masbate	3rd
Members for the Majority	Joseph Lara	PDP–Laban	Cagayan	3rd
Members for the Majority	Esmael Mangudadatu	PDP–Laban	Maguindanao	2nd
Members for the Majority	Datu Roonie Sinsuat Sr.	PDP–Laban	Maguindanao	1st
Members for the Majority	Jesus Manuel Suntay	PDP–Laban	Quezon City	4th
Members for the Majority	Samier Tan	PDP–Laban	Sulu	1st
Members for the Majority	Henry Villarica	PDP–Laban	Bulacan	4th
Members for the Majority	Marisol Panotes	PDP–Laban	Camarines Norte	2nd
Members for the Majority	Josefina Tallado	PDP–Laban	Camarines Norte	1st
Members for the Majority	Rosanna Vergara	PDP–Laban	Nueva Ecija	3rd
Members for the Majority	Julienne Baronda	NUP	Iloilo City	Lone
Members for the Majority	Ma. Lucille Nava	PDP–Laban	Guimaras	Lone
Members for the Minority	Arlene Brosas	GABRIELA	Party-list	
Members for the Minority	Sarah Jane Elago	Kabataan	Party-list	
Members for the Minority	Irene Gay Saulog	KALINGA	Party-list	
Members for the Minority	Lawrence Lemuel Fortun	Nacionalista	Agusan del Norte	1st
Members for the Minority	Ma. Victoria A. Umali	A TEACHER	Party-list	
Members for the Minority	Carlos Isagani Zarate	Bayan Muna	Party-list	

==== Chairperson ====
- Divina Grace Yu (Zamboanga del Sur–1st, PDP–Laban) August 7, 2019 – October 12, 2020

== See also ==
- House of Representatives of the Philippines
- List of Philippine House of Representatives committees
