= Philippine House Special Committee on Bicol Recovery and Economic Development =

Special committee of the House of Representatives of the Philippines

Special Committee on Bicol Recovery and Economic Development
- 20th Congress

History
- New session started: July 28, 2025

Leadership
- Chairman: Vacant since June 30, 2025
- Minority Leader: Vacant since June 30, 2025

Website
- Special Committee on Bicol Recovery and Economic Development

The Philippine House Special Committee on Bicol Recovery and Economic Development is a special committee of the Philippine House of Representatives.

== Jurisdiction ==
As prescribed by House Rules, the committee's jurisdiction is on the policies and programs to promote and enhance the development of the Bicol region including developmental projects, care programs and the Bicol river basin project.

== Members, 20th Congress ==
As of June 30, 2025, all committee membership positions are vacant.

== Historical membership rosters ==
=== 18th Congress ===
Position	Members	Party	Province/City	District
Chairperson	Jocelyn Fortuno	Nacionalista	Camarines Sur	5th
Vice Chairpersons	Ma. Laarni Cayetano	Nacionalista	Taguig–Pateros	2nd
Vice Chairpersons	Alfred Delos Santos	ANG PROBINSYANO	Party-list	
Members for the Majority	Joey Salceda	PDP–Laban	Albay	2nd
Members for the Majority	Marisol Panotes	PDP–Laban	Camarines Norte	2nd
Members for the Majority	Josefina Tallado	PDP–Laban	Camarines Norte	1st
Members for the Majority	Ronnie Ong	ANG PROBINSYANO	Party-list	
Members for the Majority	Narciso Bravo Jr.	NUP	Masbate	1st
Members for the Minority	Gabriel Bordado Jr.	Liberal	Camarines Sur	3rd
Members for the Minority	Angelica Natasha Co	BHW	Party-list	

== See also ==
- House of Representatives of the Philippines
- List of Philippine House of Representatives committees
