= Philippine House Committee on Tourism =

Standing committee of the House of Representatives of the Philippines

Committee on Tourism
- 20th Congress

History
- New session started: To convene on July 28, 2025

Leadership
- Chairman: Vacant
- Minority Leader: Vacant

Website
- Committee on Tourism

The Philippine House Committee on Tourism, or House Tourism Committee is a standing committee of the Philippine House of Representatives.

== Jurisdiction ==
As prescribed by House Rules, the committee's jurisdiction is on the promotion and development of tourism both domestic and international.

== Members, 20th Congress ==
As of June 30, 2025, all committee membership positions are vacant until the House convenes for its first regular session on July 28.

== Historical membership rosters ==
=== 18th Congress ===
Position	Members	Party	Province/City	District
Chairperson	Sol Aragones	Nacionalista	Laguna	3rd
Vice Chairpersons	Lucy Torres-Gomez	PDP–Laban	Leyte	4th
Vice Chairpersons	Yedda Marie Romualdez	Tingog Sinirangan	Party-list	
Vice Chairpersons	Ramon Nolasco Jr.	NUP	Cagayan	1st
Vice Chairpersons	Franz Alvarez	NUP	Palawan	1st
Vice Chairpersons	Edgar Chatto	Liberal	Bohol	1st
Vice Chairpersons	Manuel Zubiri	Bukidnon Paglaum	Bukidnon	3rd
Vice Chairpersons	Rommel Rico Angara	LDP	Aurora	Lone
Vice Chairpersons	Ronnie Ong	ANG PROBINSYANO	Party-list	
Vice Chairpersons	Gil Acosta	PPP	Palawan	3rd
Members for the Majority	Leo Rafael Cueva	NUP	Negros Occidental	2nd
Members for the Majority	Alfelito Bascug	NUP	Agusan del Sur	1st
Members for the Majority	Wilfredo Caminero	NUP	Cebu	2nd
Members for the Majority	Juliette Uy	NUP	Misamis Oriental	2nd
Members for the Majority	Vicente Veloso III	NUP	Leyte	3rd
Members for the Majority	Micaela Violago	NUP	Nueva Ecija	2nd
Members for the Majority	Rashidin Matba	PDP–Laban	Tawi-Tawi	Lone
Members for the Majority	Faustino Dy V	NUP	Isabela	6th
Members for the Majority	Elias Bulut Jr.	NPC	Apayao	Lone
Members for the Majority	Carlito Marquez	NPC	Aklan	1st
Members for the Majority	Gerardo Valmayor Jr.	NPC	Negros Occidental	1st
Members for the Majority	Solomon Chungalao	NPC	Ifugao	Lone
Members for the Majority	Ciriaco Gato Jr.	NPC	Batanes	Lone
Members for the Majority	Maximo Dalog Jr.	Nacionalista	Mountain Province	Lone
Members for the Majority	Ramon Guico III	Lakas	Pangasinan	5th
Members for the Majority	Jose Tejada	Nacionalista	Cotabato	3rd
Members for the Majority	Mark Go	Nacionalista	Baguio	Lone
Members for the Majority	Rogelio Neil Roque	Nacionalista	Bukidnon	4th
Members for the Majority	Corazon Nuñez-Malanyaon	Nacionalista	Davao Oriental	1st
Members for the Majority	Ma. Lourdes Acosta-Alba	Bukidnon Paglaum	Bukidnon	1st
Members for the Majority	Josefina Tallado	PDP–Laban	Camarines Norte	1st
Members for the Majority	Francisco Jose Matugas II	PDP–Laban	Surigao del Norte	1st
Members for the Majority	Cyrille Abueg-Zaldivar	PPP	Palawan	2nd
Members for the Majority	Fernando Cabredo	PDP–Laban	Albay	3rd
Members for the Majority	Lorenz Defensor	PDP–Laban	Iloilo	3rd
Members for the Majority	Dulce Ann Hofer	PDP–Laban	Zamboanga Sibugay	2nd
Members for the Majority	Estrellita Suansing	PDP–Laban	Nueva Ecija	1st
Members for the Majority	Ria Christina Fariñas	PDP–Laban	Ilocos Norte	1st
Members for the Majority	Janice Salimbangon	NUP	Cebu	4th
Members for the Majority	Adriano Ebcas	AKO PADAYON	Party-list	
Members for the Majority	Jocelyn Fortuno	Nacionalista	Camarines Sur	5th
Members for the Majority	Mercedes Cagas	Nacionalista	Davao del Sur	Lone
Members for the Majority	Jose Teves Jr.	TGP	Party-list	
Members for the Majority	Gerardo Espina Jr.	Lakas	Biliran	Lone
Members for the Majority	Ma. Angelica Amante-Matba	PDP–Laban	Agusan del Norte	2nd
Members for the Majority	Arnold Celeste	Nacionalista	Pangasinan	1st
Members for the Majority	Enrico Pineda	1PACMAN	Party-list	
Members for the Majority	Alfredo Garbin Jr.	AKO BICOL	Party-list	
Members for the Majority	Princess Rihan Sakaluran	NUP	Sultan Kudarat	1st
Members for the Majority	Elizalde Co	AKO BICOL	Party-list	
Members for the Majority	Michael Edgar Aglipay	DIWA	Party-list	
Members for the Majority	Mario Vittorio Mariño	Nacionalista	Batangas	5th
Members for the Majority	Shirlyn Bañas-Nograles	PDP–Laban	South Cotabato	1st
Members for the Majority	Roger Mercado	Lakas	Southern Leyte	Lone
Members for the Minority	Angelica Natasha Co	BHW	Party-list	
Members for the Minority	Sergio Dagooc	APEC	Party-list	
Members for the Minority	Irene Gay Saulog	KALINGA	Party-list	
Members for the Minority	Godofredo Guya	RECOBODA	Party-list	

==== Member for the Majority ====
- Bernardita Ramos (Note: Died on September 8, 2020.) (Sorsogon–2nd, NPC)

== See also ==
- House of Representatives of the Philippines
- List of Philippine House of Representatives committees
- Department of Tourism
