= Philippine House Committee on Sustainable Development Goals =

Standing committee of the House of Representatives of the Philippines

Committee on Sustainable Development Goals
- 20th Congress

History
- New session started: To convene on July 28, 2025

Leadership
- Chairman: Vacant
- Minority Leader: Vacant

Website
- Committee on Sustainable Development Goals

The Philippine House Committee on Sustainable Development Goals, or House Sustainable Development Goals Committee is a standing committee of the Philippine House of Representatives.

Originally designated as a special committee, it was elevated into a standing committee on March 10, 2020.

== Jurisdiction ==
As prescribed by House Rules, the committee's jurisdiction is on the achievement of the country's commitment of the United Nations (UN) 2030 Agenda for Sustainable Development which includes, but not limited to the following:

- Achieving gender equality and empowering women
- Ensuring access to affordable and clean energy
- Ensuring access to waters
- Eradicating extreme poverty and hunger
- Obtaining quality education
- Promoting health and well-being
- Promoting inclusive & sustainable economic growth and decent work
- Sanitation for all

== Members, 20th Congress ==
As of June 30, 2025, all committee membership positions are vacant until the House convenes for its first regular session on July 28.

== Historical membership rosters ==
=== 18th Congress ===
Position	Members	Party	Province/City	District
Chairperson	Anna Marie Villaraza-Suarez	ALONA	Party-list	
Vice Chairpersons	Cristal Bagatsing	PDP–Laban	Manila	5th
Vice Chairpersons	Jocelyn Tulfo	ACT-CIS	Party-list	
Vice Chairpersons	Vincent Franco Frasco	Lakas	Cebu	5th
Vice Chairpersons	Marlyn Alonte-Naguiat	PDP–Laban	Biñan	Lone
Members for the Majority	Jose Francisco Benitez	PDP–Laban	Negros Occidental	3rd
Members for the Majority	Claudine Diana Bautista	Dumper-PTDA	Party-list	
Members for the Majority	Rozzano Rufino Biazon	PDP–Laban	Muntinlupa	Lone
Members for the Majority	Braeden John Biron	Nacionalista	Iloilo	4th
Members for the Majority	Mohamad Khalid Dimaporo	PDP–Laban	Lanao del Norte	1st
Members for the Majority	Wilfrido Mark Enverga	NPC	Quezon	1st
Members for the Majority	Juliet Marie Ferrer	NUP	Negros Occidental	4th
Members for the Majority	Jose Enrique Garcia III	NUP	Bataan	2nd
Members for the Majority	Princess Rihan Sakaluran	NUP	Sultan Kudarat	1st
Members for the Majority	Geraldine Roman	PDP–Laban	Bataan	1st
Members for the Majority	Manuel Zubiri	Bukidnon Paglaum	Bukidnon	3rd
Members for the Majority	Antonio Albano	NUP	Isabela	1st
Members for the Majority	Amihilda Sangcopan	Anak Mindanao	Party-list	
Members for the Majority	Yedda Marie Romualdez	Tingog Sinirangan	Party-list	
Members for the Minority	Sarah Jane Elago	Kabataan	Party-list	
Members for the Minority	Stella Luz Quimbo	Liberal	Marikina	2nd

== See also ==
- House of Representatives of the Philippines
- List of Philippine House of Representatives committees
