= Philippine House Committee on Housing and Urban Development =

Standing committee of the House of Representatives of the Philippines

Committee on Housing and Urban Development
- 20th Congress

History
- New session started: To convene on July 28, 2025

Leadership
- Chairman: Vacant
- Minority Leader: Vacant

Website
- Committee on Housing and Urban Development

The Philippine House Committee on Housing and Urban Development, or House Housing and Urban Development Committee is a standing committee of the Philippine House of Representatives.

== Jurisdiction ==
As prescribed by House Rules, the committee's jurisdiction is on shelter delivery and management of urbanization issues and concerns which includes the following:

- Urban land reform
- Urban planning and development
- Welfare of the urban poor

== Members, 20th Congress ==
As of June 30, 2025, all committee membership positions are vacant until the House convenes for its first regular session on July 28.

== Historical membership rosters ==
=== 18th Congress ===
Position	Members	Party	Province/City	District
Chairperson	Jose Francisco Benitez	PDP–Laban	Negros Occidental	3rd
Vice Chairpersons	Mario Vittorio Mariño	Nacionalista	Batangas	5th
Vice Chairpersons	Gavini Pancho	NUP	Bulacan	2nd
Vice Chairpersons	Naealla Rose Bainto-Aguinaldo	BAHAY	Party-list	
Vice Chairpersons	Faustino Michael Carlos Dy III	PFP	Isabela	5th
Vice Chairpersons	Alfonso Umali Jr.	Liberal	Oriental Mindoro	2nd
Vice Chairpersons	Micaela Violago	NUP	Nueva Ecija	2nd
Vice Chairpersons	John Marvin Nieto	NUP	Manila	3rd
Vice Chairpersons	Florida Robes	NUP	San Jose del Monte	Lone
Vice Chairpersons	Florencio Noel	An Waray	Party-list	
Members for the Majority	Alfelito Bascug	NUP	Agusan del Sur	1st
Members for the Majority	Juliette Uy	NUP	Misamis Oriental	2nd
Members for the Majority	Vicente Veloso III	NUP	Leyte	3rd
Members for the Majority	Rashidin Matba	PDP–Laban	Tawi-Tawi	Lone
Members for the Majority	Faustino Michael Dy V	NUP	Isabela	6th
Members for the Majority	Jose Ong Jr.	NUP	Northern Samar	2nd
Members for the Majority	Eugenio Angelo Barba	Nacionalista	Ilocos Norte	2nd
Members for the Majority	Kristine Alexie Besas-Tutor	Nacionalista	Bohol	3rd
Members for the Majority	Romeo Jalosjos Jr.	Nacionalista	Zamboanga del Norte	1st
Members for the Majority	Jocelyn Fortuno	Nacionalista	Camarines Sur	5th
Members for the Majority	Sonny Lagon	Ako Bisaya	Party-list	
Members for the Majority	Jose Gay Padiernos	GP	Party-list	
Members for the Majority	Gerardo Valmayor Jr.	NPC	Negros Occidental	1st
Members for the Majority	Precious Castelo	NPC	Quezon City	2nd
Members for the Majority	Michael John Duavit	NPC	Rizal	1st
Members for the Majority	Cesar Jimenez Jr.	PDP–Laban	Zamboanga City	1st
Members for the Majority	Manuel Luis Lopez	NPC	Manila	1st
Members for the Majority	John Reynald Tiangco	Partido Navoteño	Navotas	Lone
Members for the Majority	Henry Villarica	PDP–Laban	Bulacan	4th
Members for the Majority	Emmarie Ouano-Dizon	PDP–Laban	Cebu	6th
Members for the Majority	Janice Salimbangon	NUP	Cebu	4th
Members for the Majority	Francis Gerald Abaya	Liberal	Cavite	1st
Members for the Majority	Allan Benedict Reyes	PFP	Quezon City	3rd
Members for the Majority	Rosanna Vergara	PDP–Laban	Nueva Ecija	3rd
Members for the Majority	Victor Yap	NPC	Tarlac	2nd
Members for the Majority	Paul Daza	Liberal	Northern Samar	1st
Members for the Majority	Shirlyn Bañas-Nograles	PDP–Laban	South Cotabato	1st
Members for the Minority	Stella Luz Quimbo	Liberal	Marikina	2nd
Members for the Minority	Arlene Brosas	GABRIELA	Party-list	
Members for the Minority	Eufemia Cullamat	Bayan Muna	Party-list	

==== Chairperson ====
- Strike Revilla (Cavite–2nd, NUP) August 5, 2019 – December 14, 2020

== See also ==
- House of Representatives of the Philippines
- List of Philippine House of Representatives committees
- Department of Human Settlements and Urban Development
