= Philippine House Committee on Information and Communications Technology =

Standing committee of the House of Representatives of the Philippines

Committee on Information and Communications Technology
- 20th Congress

History
- New session started: To convene on July 28, 2025

Leadership
- Chairman: Vacant
- Minority Leader: Vacant

Website
- Committee on Information and Communications Technology

The Philippine House Committee on Information and Communications Technology, or House Information and Communications Technology Committee is a standing committee of the Philippine House of Representatives.

== Jurisdiction ==
As prescribed by House Rules, the committee's jurisdiction includes the following:

- Any and all other public and private electronic means of capturing, processing, storing and transmitting of information for information technology
- Information systems including hardware, software and content applications
- Mobile short messaging system (SMS) applications affecting upstream and downstream business application
- Networks that enable access to online technology
- Postal, telegraph, radio, broadcast, cable television, telephone, convergence, computers and telecommunications technologies including but not limited to broadband access to wired and wireless connectivity to the internet such as voice over internet protocol (VOIP), video conferencing and audio/video/data streaming

== Members, 20th Congress ==
As of June 30, 2025, all committee membership positions are vacant until the House convenes for its first regular session on July 28.

== Historical membership rosters ==
=== 18th Congress ===
Position	Members	Party	Province/City	District
Chairperson	Victor Yap	NPC	Tarlac	2nd
Vice Chairpersons	Carlito Marquez	NPC	Aklan	1st
Vice Chairpersons	Joy Myra Tambunting	NUP	Parañaque	2nd
Vice Chairpersons	Frederick Siao	Nacionalista	Iligan	Lone
Vice Chairpersons	Fernando Cabredo	PDP–Laban	Albay	3rd
Vice Chairpersons	Francis Gerald Abaya	Liberal	Cavite	1st
Vice Chairpersons	Micaela Violago	NUP	Nueva Ecija	2nd
Members for the Majority	Faustino Michael Dy V	NUP	Isabela	6th
Members for the Majority	Alyssa Sheena Tan	PFP	Isabela	4th
Members for the Majority	Julienne Baronda	NUP	Iloilo City	Lone
Members for the Majority	Strike Revilla	NUP	Cavite	2nd
Members for the Majority	Ronnie Ong	ANG PROBINSYANO	Party-list	
Members for the Majority	Rozzano Rufino Biazon	PDP–Laban	Muntinlupa	Lone
Members for the Majority	Alan Dujali	PDP–Laban	Davao del Norte	2nd
Members for the Majority	Ramon Nolasco Jr.	NUP	Cagayan	1st
Members for the Majority	Jose Francisco Benitez	PDP–Laban	Negros Occidental	3rd
Members for the Majority	Juan Fidel Felipe Nograles	Lakas	Rizal	2nd
Members for the Majority	Eric Olivarez	PDP–Laban	Parañaque	1st
Members for the Majority	Wilton Kho	PDP–Laban	Masbate	3rd
Members for the Majority	Jose Enrique Garcia III	NUP	Bataan	2nd
Members for the Majority	Faustino Michael Carlos Dy III	PFP	Isabela	5th
Members for the Majority	Ian Paul Dy	NPC	Isabela	3rd
Members for the Majority	Erico Aristotle Aumentado	NPC	Bohol	2nd
Members for the Majority	John Reynald Tiangco	Partido Navoteño	Navotas	Lone
Members for the Majority	Manuel Luis Lopez	NPC	Manila	1st
Members for the Majority	Weslie Gatchalian	NPC	Valenzuela	1st
Members for the Majority	Enrico Pineda	1PACMAN	Party-list	
Members for the Majority	Carlos Cojuangco	NPC	Tarlac	1st
Members for the Majority	Maricel Natividad-Nagaño	PRP	Nueva Ecija	4th
Members for the Majority	Elizalde Co	AKO BICOL	Party-list	
Members for the Majority	Virgilio Lacson	MANILA TEACHERS	Party-list	
Members for the Minority	Gabriel Bordado Jr.	Liberal	Camarines Sur	3rd
Members for the Minority	Francisca Castro	ACT TEACHERS	Party-list	

== See also ==
- House of Representatives of the Philippines
- List of Philippine House of Representatives committees
- Department of Information and Communications Technology
