= Philippine House Committee on Visayas Development =

Standing committee of the House of Representatives of the Philippines

Committee on Visayas Development
- 20th Congress

History
- New session started: To convene on July 28, 2025

Leadership
- Chairman: Vacant
- Minority Leader: Vacant

Website
- Committee on Visayas Development

The Philippine House Committee on Visayas Development, or House Visayas Development Committee is a standing committee of the Philippine House of Representatives.

== Jurisdiction ==
As prescribed by House Rules, the committee's jurisdiction is on the policies, programs and related initiatives affecting the economic, social, political and cultural development of municipalities, cities and provinces in the Visayas region including needs, concerns and issues that impact on the welfare of constituencies therein.

== Members, 20th Congress ==
As of June 30, 2025, all committee membership positions are vacant until the House convenes for its first regular session on July 28.

== Historical membership rosters ==
=== 18th Congress ===
Position	Members	Party	Province/City	District
Chairperson	Vincent Franco Frasco	Lakas	Cebu	5th
Vice Chairperson	Sonny Lagon	Ako Bisaya	Party-list	
Members for the Majority	Francisco Benitez	PDP–Laban	Negros Occidental	3rd
Members for the Majority	Leo Rafael Cueva	NUP	Negros Occidental	2nd
Members for the Majority	Julienne Baronda	NUP	Iloilo City	Lone
Members for the Majority	Wilfredo Caminero	NUP	Cebu	2nd
Members for the Majority	Janice Salimbangon	NUP	Cebu	4th
Members for the Majority	Jose Ong Jr.	NUP	Northern Samar	2nd
Members for the Majority	Edgar Mary Sarmiento	NUP	Samar	1st
Members for the Majority	Vicente Veloso III	NUP	Leyte	3rd
Members for the Majority	Juliet Marie Ferrer	NUP	Negros Occidental	4th
Members for the Majority	Manuel Sagarbarria	NPC	Negros Oriental	2nd
Members for the Majority	Ma. Lucille Nava	PDP–Laban	Guimaras	Lone
Members for the Majority	Jocelyn Limkaichong	Liberal	Negros Oriental	1st
Members for the Majority	Greg Gasataya	NPC	Bacolod	Lone
Members for the Majority	Emmarie Ouano-Dizon	PDP–Laban	Cebu	6th
Members for the Majority	Emmanuel Billones	Liberal	Capiz	1st
Members for the Majority	Carlito Marquez	NPC	Aklan	1st
Members for the Majority	Lucy Torres-Gomez	PDP–Laban	Leyte	4th
Members for the Majority	Gerardo Valmayor Jr.	NPC	Negros Occidental	1st
Members for the Majority	Jake Vincent Villa	NPC	Siquijor	Lone
Members for the Majority	Carl Nicolas Cari	PFP	Leyte	5th
Members for the Majority	Genaro Alvarez Jr.	NPC	Negros Occidental	6th
Members for the Majority	Ma. Fe Abunda	PDP–Laban	Eastern Samar	Lone
Members for the Majority	Lolita Javier	PFP	Leyte	2nd
Members for the Majority	Teodorico Haresco Jr.	Nacionalista	Aklan	2nd
Members for the Majority	Braeden John Biron	Nacionalista	Iloilo	4th
Members for the Majority	Ma. Lourdes Arroyo	Lakas	Negros Occidental	5th
Members for the Majority	Paul Daza	Liberal	Northern Samar	1st
Members for the Majority	Gerardo Espina Jr.	Lakas	Biliran	Lone
Members for the Majority	Florencio Noel	An Waray	Party-list	
Members for the Majority	Kristine Alexie Tutor	Nacionalista	Bohol	3rd
Members for the Minority	Sharee Ann Tan	PDP–Laban	Samar	2nd
Members for the Minority	Arnolfo Teves Jr.	PDP–Laban	Negros Oriental	3rd
Members for the Minority	Eufemia Cullamat	Bayan Muna	Party-list	

== See also ==
- House of Representatives of the Philippines
- List of Philippine House of Representatives committees
