= Philippine House Committee on Trade and Industry =

Standing committee of the House of Representatives of the Philippines

Committee on Trade and Industry
- 20th Congress

History
- New session started: To convene on July 28, 2025

Leadership
- Chairman: Vacant
- Minority Leader: Vacant

Website
- Committee on Trade and Industry

The Philippine House Committee on Trade and Industry, or House Trade and Industry Committee is a standing committee of the Philippine House of Representatives.

== Jurisdiction ==
As prescribed by House Rules, the committee's jurisdiction includes the following:

- Consumer protection
- Designs
- Development, regulation and diversification of industry and investments
- Domestic and foreign trade
- Handicrafts and cottage industries
- Intellectual property rights
- Patents
- Prices and marketing of commodities
- Quality control
- Standards
- Trade names and trade marks
- Weights and measures

== Members, 20th Congress ==
As of June 30, 2025, all committee membership positions are vacant until the House convenes for its first regular session on July 28.

== Historical membership rosters ==
=== 18th Congress ===
Position	Members	Party	Province/City	District
Chairperson	John Reynald Tiangco	Partido Navoteño	Navotas	Lone
Vice Chairpersons	Camille Villar	Nacionalista	Las Piñas	Lone
Vice Chairpersons	Franz Alvarez	NUP	Palawan	1st
Vice Chairpersons	Rosanna Vergara	PDP–Laban	Nueva Ecija	3rd
Vice Chairpersons	Manuel Zubiri	Bukidnon Paglaum	Bukidnon	3rd
Vice Chairpersons	Braeden John Biron	Nacionalista	Iloilo	4th
Vice Chairpersons	Emmarie Ouano-Dizon	PDP–Laban	Cebu	6th
Vice Chairpersons	Jesus Manuel Suntay	PDP–Laban	Quezon City	4th
Vice Chairpersons	Allan Ty	LPGMA	Party-list	
Members for the Majority	Ma. Theresa Collantes	PDP–Laban	Batangas	3rd
Members for the Majority	Michael John Duavit	NPC	Rizal	1st
Members for the Majority	Kristine Singson-Meehan	Bileg Ti Ilokano	Ilocos Sur	2nd
Members for the Majority	Erico Aristotle Aumentado	NPC	Bohol	2nd
Members for the Majority	Luis Campos Jr.	NPC	Makati	2nd
Members for the Majority	Manuel Sagarbarria	NPC	Negros Oriental	2nd
Members for the Majority	Manuel Luis Lopez	NPC	Manila	1st
Members for the Majority	Allan Benedict Reyes	PFP	Quezon City	3rd
Members for the Majority	Julienne Baronda	NUP	Iloilo City	Lone
Members for the Majority	Leo Rafael Cueva	NUP	Negros Occidental	2nd
Members for the Majority	Strike Revilla	NUP	Cavite	2nd
Members for the Majority	Junie Cua	PDP–Laban	Quirino	Lone
Members for the Majority	Elisa Kho	PDP–Laban	Masbate	2nd
Members for the Majority	Eric Olivarez	PDP–Laban	Parañaque	1st
Members for the Majority	Eric Martinez	PDP–Laban	Valenzuela	2nd
Members for the Majority	Jose Enrique Garcia III	NUP	Bataan	2nd
Members for the Majority	Francisco Jose Matugas II	PDP–Laban	Surigao del Norte	1st
Members for the Majority	Rogelio Pacquiao	PDP–Laban	Sarangani	Lone
Members for the Majority	Marisol Panotes	PDP–Laban	Camarines Norte	2nd
Members for the Majority	Leonardo Babasa Jr.	PDP–Laban	Zamboanga del Sur	2nd
Members for the Majority	Antonino Calixto	PDP–Laban	Pasay	Lone
Members for the Majority	Jumel Anthony Espino	PDP–Laban	Pangasinan	2nd
Members for the Majority	Mark Go	Nacionalista	Baguio	Lone
Members for the Majority	Alfredo Garbin Jr.	AKO BICOL	Party-list	
Members for the Majority	Christian Unabia	Lakas	Misamis Oriental	1st
Members for the Majority	Jake Vincent Villa	NPC	Siquijor	Lone
Members for the Majority	Shirlyn Bañas-Nograles	PDP–Laban	South Cotabato	1st
Members for the Majority	Sabiniano Canama	COOP-NATCCO	Party-list	
Members for the Majority	Sharon Garin	AAMBIS-OWA	Party-list	
Members for the Majority	Roger Mercado	Lakas	Southern Leyte	Lone
Members for the Majority	Shernee Tan	Kusug Tausug	Party-list	
Members for the Minority	Gabriel Bordado Jr.	Liberal	Camarines Sur	3rd
Members for the Minority	Stella Luz Quimbo	Liberal	Marikina	2nd

==== Chairperson ====
- Weslie Gatchalian (Valenzuela–1st, NPC) July 31, 2019 – December 7, 2020

==== Member for the Majority ====
- Rodolfo Albano (Note: Died on November 5, 2019.) (LPGMA)

== See also ==
- House of Representatives of the Philippines
- List of Philippine House of Representatives committees
