= Philippine House Committee on Micro, Small and Medium Enterprise Development =

Standing committee of the House of Representatives of the Philippines

Committee on Micro, Small and Medium Enterprise Development
- 20th Congress

History
- New session started: To convene on July 28, 2025

Leadership
- Chairman: Vacant
- Minority Leader: Vacant

Website
- Committee on Micro, Small and Medium Enterprise Development

The Philippine House Committee on Micro, Small and Medium Enterprise Development, or House Micro, Small and Medium Enterprise Development Committee is a standing committee of the Philippine House of Representatives.

== Jurisdiction ==
As prescribed by House Rules, the committee's jurisdiction is on the policies and programs on entrepreneurship development which includes the promotion of the following:

- Entrepreneurship
- Establishment and continuing viability and growth of small and medium-scale enterprises
- Support to entrepreneurs

== Members, 20th Congress ==
As of June 30, 2025, all committee membership positions are vacant until the House convenes for its first regular session on July 28.

== Historical membership rosters ==
=== 18th Congress ===
Position	Members	Party	Province/City	District
Chairperson	Virgilio Lacson	MANILA TEACHERS	Party-list	
Vice Chairpersons	Camille Villar	Nacionalista	Las Piñas	Lone
Vice Chairpersons	Juliet Marie Ferrer	NUP	Negros Occidental	4th
Vice Chairpersons	Ma. Lucille Nava	PDP–Laban	Guimaras	Lone
Vice Chairpersons	Adriano Ebcas	AKO PADAYON	Party-list	
Members for the Majority	Ruth Mariano-Hernandez	Independent	Laguna	2nd
Members for the Majority	Alan Dujali	PDP–Laban	Davao del Norte	2nd
Members for the Majority	Leonardo Babasa Jr.	PDP–Laban	Zamboanga del Sur	2nd
Members for the Majority	Ria Christina Fariñas	PDP–Laban	Ilocos Norte	1st
Members for the Majority	Jonathan Keith Flores	PDP–Laban	Bukidnon	2nd
Members for the Majority	Christian Unabia	Lakas	Misamis Oriental	1st
Members for the Majority	Braeden John Biron	Nacionalista	Iloilo	4th
Members for the Majority	Allan Benedict Reyes	PFP	Quezon City	3rd
Members for the Majority	Naealla Rose Bainto-Aguinaldo	BAHAY	Party-list	
Members for the Majority	Lorna Silverio	NUP	Bulacan	3rd
Members for the Majority	Elpidio Barzaga Jr.	NUP	Cavite	4th
Members for the Majority	Fernando Cabredo	PDP–Laban	Albay	3rd
Members for the Majority	Janice Salimbangon	NUP	Cebu	4th
Members for the Majority	Princess Rihan Sakaluran	NUP	Sultan Kudarat	1st
Members for the Majority	Rowena Niña Taduran	ACT-CIS	Party-list	
Members for the Majority	Jose Ong Jr.	NUP	Northern Samar	2nd
Members for the Majority	Edgar Mary Sarmiento	NUP	Samar	1st
Members for the Majority	Romulo Peña Jr.	Liberal	Makati	1st
Members for the Majority	Enrico Pineda	1PACMAN	Party-list	
Members for the Majority	Shirlyn Bañas-Nograles	PDP–Laban	South Cotabato	1st
Members for the Minority	Angelica Natasha Co	BHW	Party-list	
Members for the Minority	Arnolfo Teves Jr.	PDP–Laban	Negros Oriental	3rd
Members for the Minority	Godofredo Guya	RECOBODA	Party-list	
Members for the Minority	Argel Joseph Cabatbat	MAGSASAKA	Party-list	
Members for the Minority	Stella Luz Quimbo	Liberal	Marikina	2nd

== See also ==
- House of Representatives of the Philippines
- List of Philippine House of Representatives committees
