= Philippine House Committee on Public Information =

Standing committee of the House of Representatives of the Philippines

Committee on Public Information
- 20th Congress

History
- New session started: To convene on July 28, 2025

Leadership
- Chairman: Vacant
- Minority Leader: Vacant

Website
- Committee on Public Information

The Philippine House Committee on Public Information, or House Public Information Committee is a standing committee of the Philippine House of Representatives.

== Jurisdiction ==
As prescribed by House Rules, the committee's jurisdiction is on the dissemination and production of information to the public through all forms of which includes the following:

- Advertising
- Cable television
- Internet
- Movie and television
- Print and broadcast media
- Video

This also includes their regulation and the rights and responsibilities of the entities and persons engaged therein.

== Members, 20th Congress ==
As of June 30, 2025, all committee membership positions are vacant until the House convenes for its first regular session on July 28.

== Historical membership rosters ==
=== 18th Congress ===
Position	Members	Party	Province/City	District
Chairperson	Joseph Lara	PDP–Laban	Cagayan	3rd
Vice Chairpersons	Ron Salo	KABAYAN	Party-list	
Vice Chairpersons	Amihilda Sangcopan	AMIN	Party-list	
Vice Chairpersons	Alfred Vargas	PDP–Laban	Quezon City	5th
Vice Chairpersons	Carl Cari	PFP	Leyte	5th
Members for the Majority	Sol Aragones	Nacionalista	Laguna	3rd
Members for the Majority	Ed Christopher Go	Nacionalista	Isabela	2nd
Members for the Majority	Jose Tejada	Nacionalista	Cotabato	3rd
Members for the Majority	Braeden John Biron	Nacionalista	Iloilo	4th
Members for the Majority	Ramon Guico III	Lakas	Pangasinan	5th
Members for the Majority	Ian Paul Dy	NPC	Isabela	3rd
Members for the Majority	Faustino Michael Carlos Dy III	PFP	Isabela	5th
Members for the Majority	Allan Benedict Reyes	PFP	Quezon City	3rd
Members for the Majority	Allan Ty	LPGMA	Party-list	
Members for the Majority	Cesar Jimenez Jr.	PDP–Laban	Zamboanga City	1st
Members for the Majority	Jake Vincent Villa	NPC	Siquijor	Lone
Members for the Majority	Vincent Franco Frasco	Lakas	Cebu	5th
Members for the Majority	Esmael Mangudadatu	PDP–Laban	Maguindanao	1st
Members for the Majority	Gavini Pancho	NUP	Bulacan	2nd
Members for the Majority	Princess Rihan Sakaluran	NUP	Sultan Kudarat	1st
Members for the Minority	Gabriel Bordado Jr.	Liberal	Camarines Sur	3rd
Members for the Minority	Francisca Castro	ACT TEACHERS	Party-list	
Members for the Minority	Arnolfo Teves Jr.	PDP–Laban	Negros Oriental	3rd

== See also ==
- House of Representatives of the Philippines
- List of Philippine House of Representatives committees
