= Philippine House Committee on Science and Technology =

Standing committee of the House of Representatives of the Philippines

Committee on Science and Technology
- 20th Congress

History
- New session started: To convene on July 28, 2025

Leadership
- Chairman: Vacant
- Minority Leader: Vacant

Website
- Committee on Science and Technology

The Philippine House Committee on Science and Technology (formerly the House Committee on Scientific and Technological Research) is a standing committee of the Philippine House of Representatives.

== Jurisdiction ==
As prescribed by House Rules, the committee's jurisdiction is on science and technology which includes the following:

- Climate and weather forecasting
- Intellectual property rights on biotechnology
- Science and technology education including the Philippine Science High School System
- Scientific and technological research and development
- Technology transfer

== Members, 20th Congress ==
As of June 30, 2025, all committee membership positions are vacant until the House convenes for its first regular session on July 28.

== Historical membership rosters ==
=== 6th Congress ===
Position	Members	Party	Province/City	District
1st Chairperson	Olegario B. Cantos	Liberal	Batangas	2nd
2nd Chairperson	Frisco F. San Juan	Nacionalista	Rizal	2nd
Vice Chairperson	Felix M. Feria Jr.	Nacionalista	Negros Occidental	3rd
Members	Amado Arrieta	Nacionalista	Cebu	6th
Members	Salvador R. Encinas	Liberal	Sorsogon	1st
Members	Angel P. Macapagal	Liberal	Pampanga	2nd
Members	José D. Moreno	Nacionalista	Romblon	At-large
Members	Gregorio P. Murillo Sr.	Nacionalista	Surigao del Sur	At-large
Members	Emmanuel Pelaez	Nacionalista	Misamis Oriental	At-large
Members	Lorenzo Sarmiento	Nacionalista	Davao	At-large

=== 18th Congress ===
Position	Members	Party	Province/City	District
Chairperson	Erico Aristotle Aumentado	NPC	Bohol	2nd
Vice Chairpersons	Faustino Dy V	NUP	Isabela	6th
Vice Chairpersons	Domingo Rivera	Citizens' Battle Against Corruption	Party-list	
Vice Chairpersons	Francis Gerald Abaya	Liberal	Cavite	1st
Members for the Majority	Divina Grace Yu	PDP–Laban	Zamboanga del Sur	1st
Members for the Majority	Joey Salceda	PDP–Laban	Albay	2nd
Members for the Majority	Alan Dujali	PDP–Laban	Davao del Norte	2nd
Members for the Majority	Jumel Anthony Espino	PDP–Laban	Pangasinan	2nd
Members for the Majority	Ria Christina Fariñas	PDP–Laban	Ilocos Norte	1st
Members for the Majority	Jonathan Keith Flores	PDP–Laban	Bukidnon	2nd
Members for the Majority	Wilton Kho	PDP–Laban	Masbate	3rd
Members for the Majority	Joseph Lara	PDP–Laban	Cagayan	3rd
Members for the Majority	Esmael Mangudadatu	PDP–Laban	Maguindanao	2nd
Members for the Majority	Faustino Michael Carlos Dy III	PFP	Isabela	5th
Members for the Majority	Michael John Duavit	NPC	Rizal	1st
Members for the Majority	Carlito Marquez	NPC	Aklan	1st
Members for the Majority	Ciriaco Gato Jr.	NPC	Batanes	Lone
Members for the Majority	Teodorico Haresco Jr.	Nacionalista	Aklan	2nd
Members for the Majority	Macnell Lusotan	MARINO	Party-list	
Members for the Majority	Shirlyn Bañas-Nograles	PDP–Laban	South Cotabato	1st
Members for the Minority	Sarah Jane Elago	Kabataan	Party-list	
Members for the Minority	Argel Joseph Cabatbat	MAGSASAKA	Party-list	

==== Member for the Majority ====
- Nestor Fongwan (Note: Died on December 18, 2019.) (Benguet–Lone, PDP–Laban)

=== 19th Congress ===
Position	Members	Party	Province/City	District
Chairperson	Carlito Marquez	NPC	Aklan	1st
Vice Chairpersons	Loreto Acharon	NPC	General Santos	At-large
Vice Chairpersons	Maria Angela Garcia	NUP	Bataan	3rd
Vice Chairpersons	Ricardo T. Kho	Lakas–CMD	Masbate	1st
Vice Chairpersons	Aniela Bianca Tolentino	NUP	Cavite	8th
Members for the Majority	Christopher de Venecia	Lakas–CMD	Pangasinan	4th
Members for the Majority	Cheeno Miguel Almario	Lakas–CMD	Davao Oriental	2nd
Members for the Majority	Maria Vanessa "Vanvan" Aumentado	Lakas–CMD	Bohol	2nd
Members for the Majority	Jil Bongalon	Ako Bicol	Party-list	
Members for the Majority	Danilo Fernandez	NUP	Santa Rosa	At-large
Members for the Majority	Joey Salceda	Lakas–CMD	Albay	2nd
Members for the Minority	Raoul Manuel	Kabataan	Party-list	
Members for the Minority	Gabriel Bordado	Liberal	Camarines Sur	3rd
Members for the Minority	Wilbert T. Lee	AGRI	Party-list	

== See also ==
- House of Representatives of the Philippines
- List of Philippine House of Representatives committees
- Department of Science and Technology
