= Philippine House Special Committee on Globalization and WTO =

Special committee of the House of Representatives of the Philippines

Special Committee on Globalization and WTO
- 20th Congress

History
- New session started: To convene on July 28, 2025

Leadership
- Chairman: Vacant
- Minority Leader: Vacant

Website
- Special Committee on Globalization and WTO

The Philippine House Special Committee on Globalization and WTO is a special committee of the Philippine House of Representatives.

== Jurisdiction ==
As prescribed by House Rules, the committee's jurisdiction is on the effects on various social sectors of the World Trade Organization's policies and other actions to harness opportunities offered by globalization for economic development.

== Members, 20th Congress ==
As of June 30, 2025, all committee membership positions are vacant until the House convenes for its first regular session on July 28.

== Historical membership rosters ==
=== 18th Congress ===
Position	Members	Party	Province/City	District
Chairperson	Shernee Tan	Kusug Tausug	Party-list	
Vice Chairpersons	Jose Gay Padiernos	GP	Party-list	
Vice Chairpersons	Sharon Garin	AAMBIS-OWA	Party-list	
Members for the Majority	Rosanna Vergara	PDP–Laban	Nueva Ecija	3rd
Members for the Majority	Aloysia Lim	RAM	Party-list	
Members for the Majority	Luisa Lloren Cuaresma	NUP	Nueva Vizcaya	Lone
Members for the Majority	Franz Alvarez	NUP	Palawan	1st
Members for the Majority	Florida Robes	NUP	San Jose del Monte	Lone
Members for the Majority	Geraldine Roman	PDP–Laban	Bataan	1st
Members for the Majority	Josefina Tallado	PDP–Laban	Camarines Norte	1st
Members for the Majority	Samier Tan	PDP–Laban	Sulu	1st
Members for the Majority	Rowena Niña Taduran	ACT-CIS	Party-list	
Members for the Minority	Francisca Castro	ACT TEACHERS	Party-list	
Members for the Minority	Godofredo Guya	RECOBODA	Party-list	

== See also ==
- House of Representatives of the Philippines
- List of Philippine House of Representatives committees
