= Philippine House Special Committee on Peace, Reconciliation and Unity =

Special committee of the House of Representatives of the Philippines

Special Committee on Peace, Reconciliation and Unity
- 20th Congress

History
- New session started: To convene on July 28, 2025

Leadership
- Chairman: Vacant
- Minority Leader: Vacant

Website
- Special Committee on Peace, Reconciliation and Unity

The Philippine House Special Committee on Peace, Reconciliation and Unity is a special committee of the Philippine House of Representatives.

== Jurisdiction ==
As prescribed by House Rules, the committee's jurisdiction includes the following:

- Cessation of hostilities generated by internal armed conflicts
- Negotiations and other policy and program initiatives in pursuit of the peace process and national reconciliation
- Welfare of rebel-returnees

== Members, 20th Congress ==
As of June 30, 2025, all committee membership positions are vacant until the House convenes for its first regular session on July 28.

== Historical membership rosters ==
=== 18th Congress ===
Position	Members	Party	Province/City	District
Chairperson	Esmael Mangudadatu	PDP–Laban	Maguindanao	2nd
Vice Chairpersons	Ma. Fe Abunda	PDP–Laban	Eastern Samar	Lone
Vice Chairpersons	Joseph Sto. Niño Bernos	Nacionalista	Abra	Lone
Vice Chairpersons	Rashidin Matba	PDP–Laban	Tawi-Tawi	Lone
Members for the Majority	Solomon Chungalao	NPC	Ifugao	Lone
Members for the Majority	Ansaruddin Abdul Malik Adiong	Nacionalista	Lanao del Sur	1st
Members for the Majority	Arnold Celeste	Nacionalista	Pangasinan	1st
Members for the Majority	Samier Tan	PDP–Laban	Sulu	1st
Members for the Majority	Abdulmunir Arbison	Nacionalista	Sulu	2nd
Members for the Majority	Geraldine Roman	PDP–Laban	Bataan	1st
Members for the Majority	Adriano Ebcas	AKO PADAYON	Party-list	
Members for the Majority	Presley De Jesus	PHILRECA	Party-list	
Members for the Minority	Eufemia Cullamat	Bayan Muna	Party-list	
Members for the Minority	Ma. Victoria A. Umali	A TEACHER	Party-list	

== See also ==
- House of Representatives of the Philippines
- List of Philippine House of Representatives committees
- Civil conflict in the Philippines
- Office of the Presidential Adviser on the Peace Process
