= Aris Aumentado =

Filipino politician and businessman (born 1977)

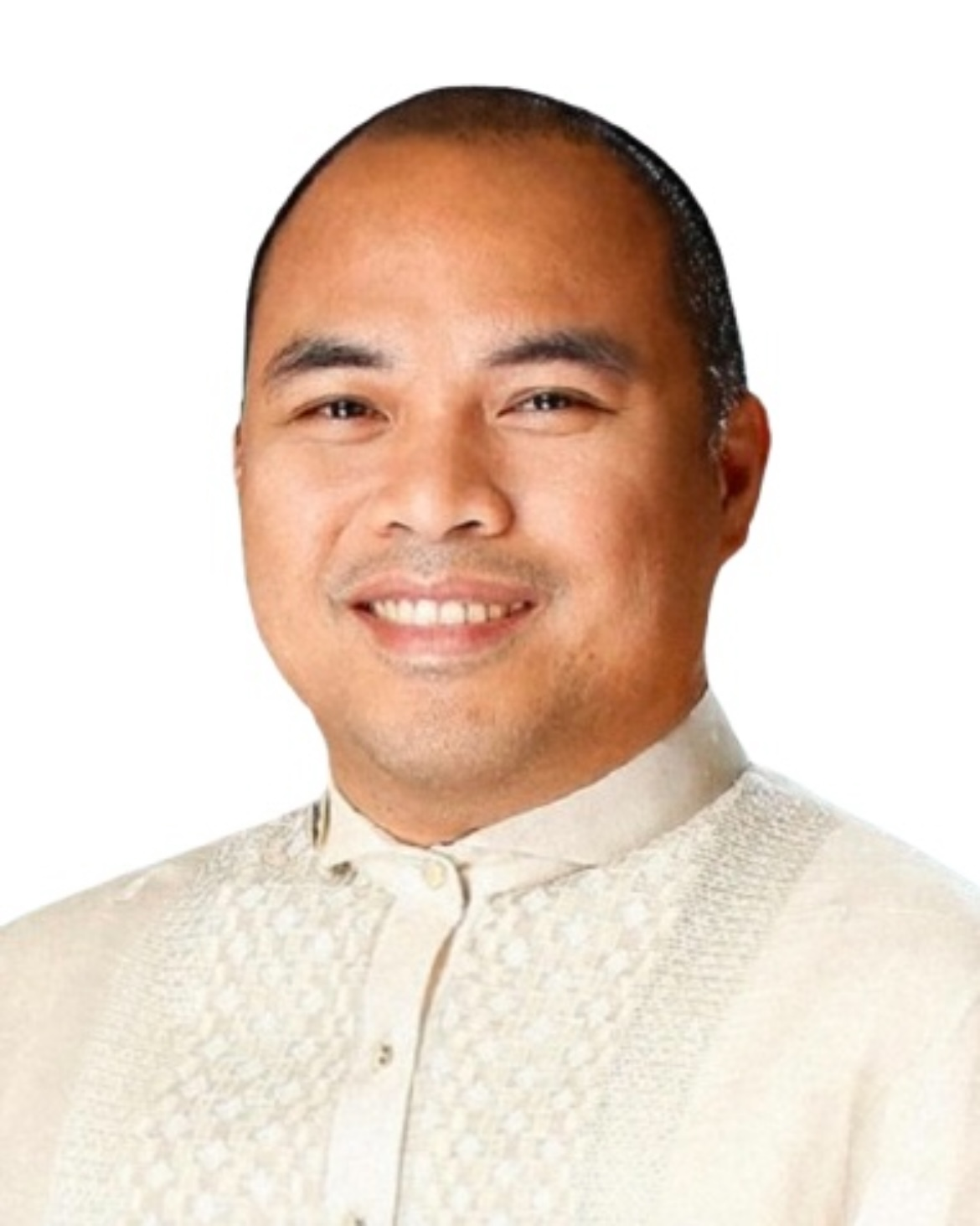
- Official portrait, 2023

27th Governor of Bohol
- Incumbent
- Assumed office June 30, 2022; Suspended: May 28 to July 31, 2024
- Vice Governor: Dionisio Victor Balite (2022–2024); Tita Baja (2024–2025); Nick Besas (2025–present)
- Preceded by: Arthur C. Yap

Member of the Philippine House of Representatives from Bohol's 2nd congressional district
- In office June 30, 2013 – June 30, 2022
- Preceded by: Erico Aumentado
- Succeeded by: Ma. Vanessa Cadorna-Aumentado

Personal details
- Born: Erico Aristotle Cabagnot Aumentado; December 29, 1977 (age 48) Tagbilaran, Bohol, Philippines
- Party: PFP (2023–present)
- Other political affiliations: NPC (2012–2023)
- Spouse: Ma. Vanessa Cadorna-Aumentado
- Children: 3
- Relatives: Erico Aumentado (father)
- Education: University of San Carlos(BBA)

Erico Aristotle Cabagnot Aumentado (born December 29, 1977), also known in Bohol as Aris, is a Filipino businessman and politician. He was a member of the House of Representatives, representing the second district of Bohol. He is the Governor of the Province of Bohol, assuming office on June 30, 2022 but was preventively suspended on May 28, 2024 due to the controversial resort construction in the middle of the Chocolate Hills. He was reinstated by the Ombudsman on July 31.

== Early life and education ==
Erico Aristotle is the youngest of eight children of former Bohol governor and deputy speaker Erico Aumentado and Peregrina Cabagnot-Aumentado. He finished his elementary and secondary education at Bohol Wisdom School. He took up Bachelor of Science in Business Administration at the University of San Carlos in 1995.

== Political career ==
Aumentado became a kagawad, and then chairman of the Sangguniang Kabataan in 1996–2001. Aumentado wanted to run as board member in 2010 elections but his father didn't allow any of his children to enter politics.

He served as chief of staff of his father until he was designated by the House of Representatives as the caretaker congressman of Bohol's second district to serve the remaining seven months left of his father's term in December 2012.

=== Representative, Bohol's 2nd District ===
On May 13, 2013, Aumentado won and elected as the new representative of the province's 2nd District. On May 9, 2016, he was re-elected for the second term. Like his father, Aumentado ran again for the third consecutive term and was re-elected on May 13, 2019.

During the 17th and 18th Congress, Aumentado was the chairperson of the Philippine House Committee on Science and Technology consisting of 29 members.

==== House Committee Membership ====
- Chairman, Science and Technology
- Member, Ecology
- Member, Economic Affairs
- Member, Foreign Affairs
- Member, Information and Communications Technology
- Member, Inter-Parliamentary Relations and Diplomacy
- Member, National Defense And Security
- Member, Public Order and Safety
- Member, Public Works and Highways
- Member, Trade and Industry

In October 2019, Aumentado firmly opposed the reported establishment of a coal power plant in Bohol through his House Bill 3710.

During the COVID-19 pandemic, Aumentado filed House Resolution No. 669 to temporarily ban flights between China and Bohol-Panglao International Airport.

==== Passed Bills ====
Principal Authored Bills
  - HB05792 Balik Scientist Act of 2018 (Republic Act No. 11035).
  - HB08541 Philippine Space Development Act of 2019 (Republic Act No. 11363).
  - Consolidated to Salary Standardization Law of 2020 (Republic Act No. 11466)
    - HB03955 An Act Upgrading the Minimum Salary of Government Nurses From Salary Grade 11 to Salary Grade 15
    - HB03956 An Act Upgrading the Basic Salary of Public School Teachers Salary Grade 11 to Salary Grade 15
    - HB05712 An Act Modifying the Salary Schedule for Civilian Government Personnel And Authorizing the Grant of Additional Benefits, and for Other Purposes
  - HB00059 Retail Trade Liberalization Act of 2020 (Republic Act No. 11595)
  - HB04933 An Act Postponing the May 2020 Barangay and Sangguniang Kabataan Elections (Republic Act No. 11462)
  - Republic Act No. 11516
    - HB04924 An act granting the Negros Broadcasting and Publishing Corporation a franchise to construct, install, establish, operate and maintain radio broadcasting stations in Luzon, Visayas and Mindanao.
    - HB07264 An act renewing for another twenty-five (25) years the franchise granted to Negros Broadcasting and Publishing Corporation, under Republic Act No. 8161, entitled “An act granting the Negros Broadcasting and Publishing Corporation a franchise to establish, operate and maintain radio and television broadcasting stations in the Visayas and Mindanao”
  - HB04157 An Act Amending Sections and Adding New Sections all under the National Internal Revenue Code of 1997, as amended and for other purposes. (Republic Act No. 11534)
  - HB05832 An act authorizing the President to expedite the processing and issuance of national and local permits, licenses and certifications in times of National Emergency. (Republic Act No. 11517)
  - HB04402 An act renewing for another twenty-five (25) years the franchise granted to Tagbilaran Broadcasting System Inc., formerly Tagbilaran System, to construct, install, operate, and maintain radio and television broadcasting stations in the province of Bohol and anywhere in the Philippines. (Republic Act No. 11578)
  - HB05832 An act creating the Department of Filipinos Overseas and Foreign Employment, defining its mandate, powers and functions, appropriating funds therefor. (Republic Act No. 11641)
Co-Authored Bills
  - HB01026 An Act Amending Sections 141, 142 and 143 of Republic Act No. 8424, as Amended, Otherwise known as the National Internal Revenue Code of 1997 (Republic Act No. 11467)
  - HB00078 An act providing for the definition of public utility, further amending for the purpose Commonwealth Act No. 146, otherwise known as the "Public Service Act" as amended. (Republic Act No. 11659)
  - HB00313 An act amending sections 4, 5, 20, 22, 27, 28, 34, 40, 50, 73, 112, 117, 204, 222, 237, 237-a, 255, 256, 257, 258, 260, 261, 262, 263, 264, 265, 266, 275, 288, 290 and adding sections 6-a, 282-a, 291, 292, 293, 294, 295, 296, 297, 298, 299, 300, 301, 301-a, 301-b, 302, 303, 304, 305, 306, 307, 308, 309, 310, 311, 312, 313 and 314 under the National Internal Revenue Code of 1997, as amended, and for other purposes. (Republic Act No. 11534)
  - HB01029 An act postponing the date of the barangay and sangguniang kabataan elections to second Monday of May 2021, amending further for the purpose republic act no. 9164, as amended by republic act no. 9340, Republic Act no. 10632, Republic Act no. 10656, Republic Act no. 10923 and Republic Act no. 10952. (Republic Act No. 11462)
  - HB01221 An act amending sections 4 and 8 of Republic Act no. 7042, as amended, otherwise known as the 'Foreign Investments Act of 1991'. (Republic Act No. 11647)
  - HB01222 An act setting the minimum paid up capital and locally produced stock inventory requirements for foreign retail business enterprises amending for the purpose Republic Act no. 8762, otherwise known as the Retail Trade Liberalization Act. (Republic Act No. 11595)
  - HB02067 An act creating the department of Overseas Filipino Workers, defining its powers and functions, appropriating funds therefor, and for other purposes. (Republic Act no. 11641).

=== Governor of Bohol ===
On May 10, 2022, Aumentado was proclaimed as new governor of province after defeating the then incumbent governor Arthur C. Yap via landslide.

On October 19, 2022, Aumentado was appointed chairman of the Regional Development Council (RDC) in Central Visayas through a submitted transmittal letter from President Bongbong Marcos.

==== Suspension ====
On May 28, 2024, Aumentado alongside 68 other Bohol officials received preventive suspensions from the Office of the Ombudsman due to the cases filed against Aumentado with illegal construction of buildings in the middle of the Chocolate Hills.

According to the order that was distributed, Aumentado will be suspended for six months from office. This led to Vice Governor Dionisio Balite temporarily assuming the office of governor that day.

On June 11, 2024, Aumentado filed an appeal to reconsider the Ombudsman's preventive suspension. The Ombudsman Samuel Martires, in his Order dated July 31, lifted the six-month suspension of Aumentado and 30 other officials.

== Electoral history ==
Electoral history of Aris Aumentado
Year	Office	Party	Votes received				Result
Year	Office	Party	Total	%	P.	Swing	Result
2013	Representative (Bohol–2nd)	NPC	99,691	50.64%	1st	—N/a	Won
2016	Representative (Bohol–2nd)	NPC	134,537	72.94%	1st	+22.30	Won
2019	Representative (Bohol–2nd)	NPC	148,541	71.08%	1st	-1.86	Won
2022	Governor of Bohol	NPC	469,736	56.09%	1st	—N/a	Won
2025	Governor of Bohol	PFP	563,746	65.43%	1st	+9.34	Won

Political offices
Preceded by Arthur C. Yap	Governor of Bohol; 2022–2024; Suspended:May 28–July 31, 2024	Succeeded by Dionisio Victor Balite; May 28–July 17, 2024; Tita Baja; July 18, 2024–present
House of Representatives of the Philippines
Preceded by Erico B. Aumentado	Member of the House of Representatives from Bohol's 2nd district 2013–2022	Succeeded by Ma. Vanessa C. Aumentado
