= Philippine House Committee on Veterans Affairs and Welfare =

Standing committee of the House of Representatives of the Philippines

Committee on Veterans Affairs and Welfare
- 20th Congress

History
- New session started: To convene on July 28, 2025

Leadership
- Chairman: Vacant
- Minority Leader: Vacant

Website
- Committee on Veterans Affairs and Welfare

The Philippine House Committee on Veterans Affairs and Welfare, or House Veterans Affairs and Welfare Committee, is a standing committee of the Philippine House of Representatives.

== Jurisdiction ==
As prescribed by House Rules, the committee's jurisdiction is on the welfare of war veterans, veterans of military campaigns, military retirees, and their surviving spouses and other beneficiaries.

== Members, 20th Congress ==
As of June 30, 2025, all committee membership positions are vacant until the House convenes for its first regular session on July 28.

== Historical membership rosters ==
=== 18th Congress ===
Position	Members	Party	Province/City	District
Chairperson	Geraldine Roman	PDP–Laban	Bataan	1st
Vice Chairpersons	Jose Ong Jr.	NUP	Northern Samar	2nd
Vice Chairpersons	Manuel Cabochan	MAGDALO	Party-list	
Members for the Majority	Hector Sanchez	Lakas	Catanduanes	Lone
Members for the Majority	Leonardo Babasa Jr.	PDP–Laban	Zamboanga del Sur	2nd
Members for the Majority	Christian Unabia	Lakas	Misamis Oriental	1st
Members for the Majority	Pablo Ortega	NPC	La Union	1st
Members for the Majority	Shirlyn Bañas-Nograles	PDP–Laban	South Cotabato	1st
Members for the Majority	Raymond Democrito Mendoza	TUCP	Party-list	
Members for the Minority	Sergio Dagooc	APEC	Party-list	
Members for the Minority	Ma. Victoria A. Umali	A TEACHER	Party-list	

==== Member for the Majority ====
- Rodolfo Albano (Note: Died on November 5, 2019.) (LPGMA)

== See also ==
- House of Representatives of the Philippines
- List of Philippine House of Representatives committees
