= Philippine House Committee on Government Reorganization =

Standing committee of the House of Representatives of the Philippines

Committee on Government Reorganization
- 20th Congress

History
- New session started: To convene on July 28, 2025

Leadership
- Chairman: Salvador Pleyto, PFP
- Minority Leader: Chel Diokno, Akbayan

Website
- Committee on Government Reorganization

The Philippine House Committee on Government Reorganization, or House Government Reorganization Committee is a standing committee of the Philippine House of Representatives.

== Jurisdiction ==
As prescribed by House Rules, the committee's jurisdiction includes the following:

- Reorganization of the government or any of its branches, departments and instrumentalities, excluding government-owned or controlled corporations
- Creation, abolition or change of the principal functions or nature of any government department, agency, commission or board

== Members, 20th Congress ==
As of June 30, 2025, all committee membership positions are vacant until the House convenes for its first regular session on July 28.

== Historical membership rosters ==
=== 18th Congress ===
Position	Members	Party	Province/City	District
Chairperson	Mario Vittorio Mariño	Nacionalista	Batangas	5th
Vice Chairpersons	Jose Gay Padiernos	GP	Party-list	
Vice Chairpersons	Lorenz Defensor	PDP–Laban	Iloilo	3rd
Vice Chairpersons	Allan Ty	LPGMA	Party-list	
Members for the Majority	Mohamad Khalid Dimaporo	PDP–Laban	Lanao del Norte	1st
Members for the Majority	Marisol Panotes	PDP–Laban	Camarines Norte	2nd
Members for the Majority	Joey Salceda	PDP–Laban	Albay	2nd
Members for the Majority	Mark Go	Nacionalista	Baguio	Lone
Members for the Majority	Raul Tupas	Nacionalista	Iloilo	5th
Members for the Majority	Vicente Veloso III	NUP	Leyte	3rd
Members for the Majority	Jose Ong Jr.	NUP	Northern Samar	2nd
Members for the Majority	Ron Salo	KABAYAN	Party-list	
Members for the Majority	Presley De Jesus	PHILRECA	Party-list	
Members for the Majority	Yedda Marie Romualdez	Tingog Sinirangan	Party-list	
Members for the Majority	Ian Paul Dy	NPC	Isabela	3rd
Members for the Majority	Sabiniano Canama	COOP-NATCCO	Party-list	
Members for the Minority	Sergio Dagooc	APEC	Party-list	
Members for the Minority	Francisca Castro	ACT TEACHERS	Party-list	
Members for the Minority	Ferdinand Gaite	Bayan Muna	Party-list	

== See also ==
- House of Representatives of the Philippines
- List of Philippine House of Representatives committees
