= Philippine House Committee on Disaster Resilience =

Standing committee of the House of Representatives of the Philippines

Committee on Disaster Resilience
- 20th Congress

History
- New session started: July 28, 2025

Leadership
- Chair: Vacant since June 30, 2025
- Minority Leader: Vacant since June 30, 2025

Website
- Committee on Disaster Management

The Philippine House Committee on Disaster Resilience, or House Disaster Resilience Committee is a standing committee of the Philippine House of Representatives.

The said committee was previously called as the Committee on Disaster Management.

== Jurisdiction ==
As prescribed by House Rules, the committee's jurisdiction includes the following:

- Disaster and calamities both natural and man-made
- Policies, plans, programs and projects related to disaster risk and vulnerability reduction and management including disaster preparedness and resiliency, relief and rescue, recovery, rehabilitation and reconstruction

== Members, 20th Congress ==
As of June 30, 2025, all committee membership positions are vacant.

== Historical membership rosters ==
=== 18th Congress ===
Position	Members	Party	Province/City	District
Chairperson	Lucy Torres-Gomez	PDP–Laban	Leyte	4th
Vice Chairpersons	Romeo Momo Sr.	CWS	Party-list	
Vice Chairpersons	Yedda Marie Romualdez	Tingog Sinirangan	Party-list	
Vice Chairpersons	Dale Malapitan	PDP–Laban	Caloocan	1st
Vice Chairpersons	Marisol Panotes	PDP–Laban	Camarines Norte	2nd
Vice Chairpersons	Leonardo Babasa Jr.	PDP–Laban	Zamboanga del Sur	2nd
Vice Chairpersons	Presley De Jesus	PHILRECA	Party-list	
Vice Chairpersons	Eleandro Jesus Madrona	Nacionalista	Romblon	Lone
Members for the Majority	Divina Grace Yu	PDP–Laban	Zamboanga del Sur	1st
Members for the Majority	Cheryl Deloso-Montalla	Liberal	Zambales	2nd
Members for the Majority	Alfred Vargas	PDP–Laban	Quezon City	5th
Members for the Majority	Lorenz Defensor	PDP–Laban	Iloilo	3rd
Members for the Majority	Mohamad Khalid Dimaporo	PDP–Laban	Lanao del Norte	1st
Members for the Majority	Alan 1 Ecleo	PDP–Laban	Dinagat Islands	Lone
Members for the Majority	Ruwel Peter Gonzaga	PDP–Laban	Davao de Oro	2nd
Members for the Majority	John Reynald Tiangco	Partido Navoteño	Navotas	Lone
Members for the Majority	Juliet Marie Ferrer	NUP	Negros Occidental	4th
Members for the Majority	Manuel Luis Lopez	NPC	Manila	1st
Members for the Majority	Ansaruddin Abdul Malik Adiong	Nacionalista	Lanao del Sur	1st
Members for the Majority	Nestor Fongwan (Note: Died on December 18, 2019.)	PDP–Laban	Benguet	Lone
Members for the Majority	Amihilda Sangcopan	Anak Mindanao	Party-list	
Members for the Majority	Micaela Violago	NUP	Nueva Ecija	2nd
Members for the Majority	Elizalde Co	AKO BICOL	Party-list	
Members for the Minority	Angelica Natasha Co	BHW	Party-list	
Members for the Minority	Arlene Brosas	GABRIELA	Party-list	

== See also ==
- House of Representatives of the Philippines
- List of Philippine House of Representatives committees
- National Disaster Risk Reduction and Management Council
