= Philippine House Special Committee on Land Use =

Special committee of the House of Representatives of the Philippines

Special Committee on Land Use
- 20th Congress

History
- New session started: To convene on July 28, 2025

Leadership
- Chairman: Vacant
- Minority Leader: Vacant

Website
- Special Committee on Land Use

The Philippine House Special Committee on Land Use is a special committee of the Philippine House of Representatives.

== Jurisdiction ==
As prescribed by House Rules, the committee's jurisdiction is on land use issues which includes the following:

- Enhancement of resource use and management of indigenous cultural communities
- Land valuation regulation
- Preservation of historical and cultural heritage sites
- Public-private partnership as well as linkages among national and local agencies and stakeholders in land resource management

== Members, 20th Congress ==
As of June 30, 2025, all committee membership positions are vacant until the House convenes for its first regular session on July 28.

== Historical membership rosters ==
=== 18th Congress ===
Position	Members	Party	Province/City	District
Chairperson	Eduardo Gullas	Nacionalista	Cebu	1st
Vice Chairpersons	Teodorico Haresco Jr.	Nacionalista	Aklan	2nd
Vice Chairpersons	Presley De Jesus	PHILRECA	Party-list	
Members for the Majority	Samantha Louise Vargas-Alfonso	NUP	Cagayan	2nd
Members for the Majority	Ramon Nolasco Jr.	NUP	Cagayan	1st
Members for the Majority	Adriano Ebcas	AKO PADAYON	Party-list	
Members for the Majority	Jocelyn Tulfo	ACT-CIS	Party-list	
Members for the Minority	Arlene Brosas	GABRIELA	Party-list	
Members for the Minority	Sergio Dagooc	APEC	Party-list	

== See also ==
- House of Representatives of the Philippines
- List of Philippine House of Representatives committees
