= Philippine House Special Committee on Creative Industry and Performing Arts =

Special Committee on Creative Industry and Performing Arts
- 20th Congress

History
- New session started: July 28, 2025

Leadership
- Chairman: Vacant since June 30, 2025
- Minority Leader: Vacant since June 30, 2025

Website
- Special Committee on Creative Industry and Performing Arts

The Philippine House Special Committee on Creative Industry and Performing Arts is a special committee of the Philippine House of Representatives.

== Members, 20th Congress ==
As of June 30, 2025, all committee membership positions are vacant.

== Historical membership rosters ==
=== 18th Congress ===
Position	Members	Party	Province/City	District
Chairperson	Christopher De Venecia	Lakas	Pangasinan	4th
Vice Chairperson	Lucy Torres-Gomez	PDP–Laban	Leyte	4th
Members for the Majority	Cristal Bagatsing	PDP–Laban	Manila	5th
Members for the Majority	Lianda Bolilia	Nacionalista	Batangas	4th
Members for the Majority	Marlyn Alonte-Naguiat	PDP–Laban	Biñan	Lone
Members for the Majority	Rosanna Vergara	PDP–Laban	Nueva Ecija	3rd
Members for the Majority	Sol Aragones	Nacionalista	Laguna	3rd
Members for the Majority	John Marvin Nieto	NUP	Manila	3rd
Members for the Minority	Stella Luz Quimbo	Liberal	Marikina	2nd
Members for the Minority	Angelica Natasha Co	BHW	Party-list	

== See also ==
- House of Representatives of the Philippines
- List of Philippine House of Representatives committees
