= LPG Marketers Association =

Philippine trade group and political party

- — Philippine partylist —
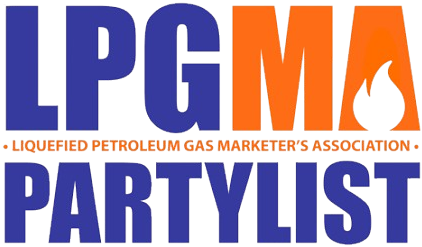
- Abbreviation: LPGMA or LPG/MA
- President: Arnel Ty
- Sector(s) represented: Liquefied petroleum gas retailers and indigent sector
- Founded: 2003; 23 years ago
- COMELEC accreditation: 2009; 17 years ago
- Colors: Orange, Blue

Current representation (20th Congress)
- Seats in the House of Representatives: 1 / 3 (Out of 63 party-list seats)
- Representative(s): Allan Ty

Website
- lpgma.com.ph

The LPG Marketers Association (LPGMA or LPG/MA) is an organization for retailers of liquefied petroleum gas in the Philippines which also has party-list representation in the House of Representatives of the Philippines.

== History ==
The LPG Marketers Association was established in 2003, although it only was registered with the Commission on Elections as a group eligible for party-list representation in the House of Representatives in 2009.

Outside of its role as a partylist, the LPGMA is a group of independent retailers of liquefied petroleum gas who agrees upon and regulates prizes of LPG products sold by its members.

It first sought sectoral representation in the lower house of the Congress in the 2010 elections. It won a seat.

The Federation of Philippine Industries (FPI) under president Jesus Arranza filed cartelization charges against members of the LPGMA. Arnel Ty retorted stating that Arranza was being critical against the LPGMA decision's to lower LPG prizes. The LPGMA alleged that the FPI is a front of the Big 3, or the three main petroleum firms in the Philippines – Shell, Petron, and Chevron.

Their participation in the 2013 elections was challenged by the FPI which argued that retailers are not eligible to have partylist representation as per the Partylist Law or the 1986 Philippine Constitution. The association was allowed to participate and it retained its seat. The FPI continued to sought the disqualification of LPGMA. The Supreme Court dismissed FPI's petition by June 2014.

== Electoral history ==
Election	Votes	%	Seats
2010	417,771	1.39	1
2013	370,897	1.34	1
2016	466,103	1.44	1
2019	208,219	0.75	1
2022	453,895	1.23	1
2025	517,833	1.23	1

== Representatives to Congress ==
Period	Representative
15th Congress; 2010–2013	Arnel Ty
16th Congress; 2013–2016	Arnel Ty
17th Congress; 2016–2019	Arnel Ty
18th Congress; 2019–2022	Rodolfo Albano Jr. (until November 2019; died in office)
18th Congress; 2019–2022	Allan Ty (since November 2019)
19th Congress; 2022–2025	Allan Ty
20th Congress; 2025–2028	Allan Ty
Note: A party-list group, can win a maximum of three seats in the House of Representatives.
