= Ang Probinsyano Party-list =

Political party in the Philippines

Ang Probinsyano
- — Philippine partylist —
- Full name: Alyansa ng mga Mamamayang Probinsyano
- Abbreviation: APPL
- Sector(s) represented: Rural
- Headquarters: Legazpi, Albay
- Colors: Blue, Red; Green (formerly; 2019 elections)
- Slogan: "Ang boses ng Probinsya ko!" (transl. 'The Voice of my Province!')

Current representation (20th Congress)
- Seats in the House of Representatives: 1 / 3 (Out of 63 party-list seats)
- Representative(s): Alfred delos Santos

Website
- agimatpartylist.org.ph

The Alyansa ng mga Mamamayang Probinsyano (lit. 'Alliance of Citizens from the Provinces'), also known as the Ang Probinsyano Party-list (APPL) is political organization which has party-list representation in the House of Representatives of the Philippines as of the 18th Congress.

The group seeks representation of farmers, fishers and other marginalized groups in the provinces or rural areas of the Philippines.

== Electoral history ==
=== 2019 elections ===
Ang Probinsyano sought representation for the first time when it ran in the 2019 mid-term elections. The partylist group seeks to represent the concerns of those residing in therural areas of the Philippines. Its campaign was supported by Coco Martin and Yassi Pressman. The two were known for their acting roles in the ABS-CBN television series Ang Probinsyano which shares the name with the partylist group.

Angelo Palmones former representative of AGHAM Partylist made a bid for the Commission on Elections (Comelec) to stop the proclamation of Ang Probinsyano on the grounds that it allegedly took undue advantage of naming themselves after Ang Probinsyano for name recall. Palmones argues that this gave the partylist, 1,210 minutes of indirect exposure from February 12 until April 5 (from the official start of the campaign season to the date when Palmones' petition was filed) and also took note the endorsement of two of the series' lead actors. The Section 9 of Comelec Resolution 10488 limits campaign advertisements for national candidates to 120 minutes for television which Palmones argues the partylist and ABS-CBN violated.

Ang Probinsyano was among the 51 winning partylist groups proclaimed by the Comelec. It secured 2 seats in the House of Representatives.

=== 2022 elections ===
Ang Probinsyano won one seat in the 2022 election.

=== 2025 elections ===
In the 2025 elections, Ang Probinsyano Party-list won its seat by Comelec canceling the registration of Duterte Youth Partylist.

== Representatives to Congress ==
=== Summary ===
Period	1st Representative	2nd Representative
18th Congress; 2019–2022	Alfred delos Santos	Ronnie Ong
19th Congress; 2022–2025	Alfred delos Santos	—
20th Congress; 2025–2028	Alfred delos Santos	—
Note: A party-list group, can win a maximum of three seats in the House of Representatives.

== Electoral history ==
Election	Votes	%	Seats
2019	770,344	2.76	2
2022	714,634	1.94	1
2025	250,886	0.60	1
