= Eufemia Cullamat =

Filipina politician

Member of the Philippine House of Representatives for Bayan Muna party-list
- In office June 30, 2019 – June 30, 2022 Serving with Carlos Isagani Zarate and Ferdinand Gaite

Personal details
- Born: Eufemia Campos; August 13, 1960 (age 65) Lianga, Surigao del Sur, Philippines
- Party: Bayan Muna
- Children: Jevilyn Cullamat (deceased); Jikson Cullamat
- Profession: Politician; Human rights activist Lawyer

Eufemia Campos Cullamat (born August 13, 1960), also known as Ka Femia, is a Filipina farmer, activist, and politician. She was a member of the Philippine House of Representatives for the 18th Congress under the Bayan Muna party-list group. She is the second Manobo to serve in Congress after former Cotabato Representative Nancy Catamco.

As a tribal leader and activist, she has been active in movements to fight for the rights of indigenous peoples in the Philippines since the 1980s. She was chair of Lumad organization Kahugpungan sa Lumadnong Organisasyon sa Caraga (Kasalo Caraga).

On December 4, 2024, Cullamat and 74 others filed the second impeachment complaint against Vice President Sara Duterte, submitting one article of impeachment: betrayal of public trust.

== Biography ==
Cullamat was born on August 13, 1960 in Lianga, Surigao del Sur. She is a member of the Manobo people from the mountains of Barangay Diatagon of Lianga. She has been active in movements to fight for the rights of indigenous peoples in the Philippines since the 1980s.

She was a community development worker at the Tribal Filipino Program of Surigao del Sur (TRIFPSS).

She helped found Malahutayong Pakigbisog Alang sa Sumusunod (MAPASU) in 1996 and served as one of its council members. She was also chair of Lumad organization Kasalo Caraga.

== Political career ==
Cullamat authored or supported a number of bills and resolutions as a member of the 18th Congress. She co-authored the anti-endo bill seeking to give security of employment to workers by ending the practice of endo or labor contractualization.

She also co-authored the Sexual Orientation and Gender Identity Expression (SOGIE) Equality Bill, which aims to prevent discrimination based on sexual orientation.

Cullamat supports the renewal of ABS-CBN's TV and radio broadcasting franchise.

She supports climate justice and is one of the principal authors of a House of Representatives resolution declaring a climate and environmental emergency. The resolution gives the Philippine government justification to pursue climate justice from industrialized countries whose actions have triggered destructive climate change effects.

== Advocacies ==
Cullamat is involved in the fight for the rights of national minorities and is active in Indigenous peoples organizations. She campaigns to protect Lumad schools in Mindanao and continues to protest the persecution and red-tagging of Lumad communities and their leaders.

Cullamat has called for an end to mining and logging on ancestral lands, where Indigenous peoples are harassed and face displacement.

== Death of Jevilyn Cullamat ==
On November 29, 2020, her youngest daughter Jevilyn Campos Cullamat died in an encounter with the 3rd Special Forces “Arrowhead” Battalion of the Philippine Army in Marihatag, Surigao Del Sur. The battalion alleged that she was a medic for New People's Army unit in Surigao Del Sur. The battalion also allegedly recovered firearms, ammunition, and subversive documents at the encounter site. Antonio Parlade Jr. of the National Task Force to End Local Communist Armed Conflict alleged that Jevilyn's death is proof of Bayan Muna's role in recruiting the youth to the NPA.

Jevilyn's death was a subject of controversies. The Makabayan bloc condemned the manner of the rebel's corpse after photographs were posted depicting what they say as Jevilyn's "obviously artificially posed body" along with confiscated paraphernalia. The bloc said that the remains were treated as a war trophy. Defense Secretary Delfin Lorenzana has called for the investigation on the body's treatment and a review protocol in handling bodies of rebels killed in battle.
