= Legislative districts of Palawan =

Legislative district of the Philippines

The legislative districts of Palawan are the representations of the province of Palawan and the highly urbanized city of Puerto Princesa in the various national legislatures of the Philippines. The province and the city are currently represented in the lower house of the Congress of the Philippines through their first, second, and third congressional districts.

== History ==
Areas now under the jurisdiction of Palawan were represented under the districts of Calamianes, Paragua, and Balabac in the Malolos Congress from 1898 to 1899. Paragua and Balabac had two delegates each, while Calamianes had three. Paragua was later renamed to Palawan in 1903 and Calamianes and Balabac were dissolved and annexed to Palawan.

Palawan later comprised a single assembly district from 1907 to 1972. When seats for the upper house of the Philippine Legislature were elected from territory-based districts between 1916 and 1935, the province formed part of the eighth senatorial district which elected two out of the 24-member senate.

In the disruption caused by the Second World War, two delegates represented the province in the National Assembly of the Japanese-sponsored Second Philippine Republic: one was the provincial governor (an ex officio member), while the other was elected through a provincial assembly of KALIBAPI members during the Japanese occupation of the Philippines. Upon the restoration of the Philippine Commonwealth in 1945, the province continued to comprise a lone district.

The province was represented in the Interim Batasang Pambansa as part of Region IV-A from 1978 to 1984, and elected one representative, at large, to the Regular Batasang Pambansa in 1984. Palawan was reapportioned into two congressional districts under the new Constitution which was proclaimed on February 11, 1987, and elected members to the restored House of Representatives starting that same year.

The passage of Republic Act No. 10171 in 2012 separated Puerto Princesa and Aborlan from the second district to form the third district, which first elected its own representative in the 2013 elections.

== Current districts ==
The province was last redistricted in 2012, wherein the province gained its third seat in the House. All incumbent representatives are part of the majority bloc.

Political parties

NUP (1)
NPC (2)

Legislative districts and representatives of Palawan
District	Current Representative		Party	Constituent LGUs	Population (2020)	Area
District	Image	Name	Party	Constituent LGUs	Population (2020)	Area
1st		Rosalie A. Salvame (since 2025); Taytay	NUP	List: Agutaya; Araceli; Busuanga; Cagayancillo; Coron; Culion; Cuyo; Dumaran; El Nido; Kalayaan; Linapacan; Magsaysay; Roxas; San Vicente; Taytay	453,897	7,725.90 km^{2}
2nd		Jose Alvarez (since 2022); Rizal	NPC	List: Balabac; Bataraza; Brooke's Point; Narra; Quezon; Rizal; Sofronio Española	438,769	6,116.50 km^{2}
3rd		Gil A. Acosta Jr. (since 2025); Bancao-bancao, Puerto Princesa	NPC	List: Aborlan; Puerto Princesa	345,815	3,188.35 km^{2}

== Historical districts ==
=== Lone District (defunct) ===
Period	Representative
1st Philippine Legislature; 1907–1909	Santiago M. Patero
2nd Philippine Legislature; 1909–1912	Manuel Sandoval
3rd Philippine Legislature; 1912–1916	Manuel Sandoval
4th Philippine Legislature; 1916–1919	Manuel Sandoval
5th Philippine Legislature; 1919–1922	Ramon De Jesus
6th Philippine Legislature; 1922–1925	Patricio Fernandez
7th Philippine Legislature; 1925–1928	Patricio Fernandez
8th Philippine Legislature; 1928–1931	Patricio Fernandez
9th Philippine Legislature; 1931–1934	Claudio R. Sandoval
10th Philippine Legislature; 1934–1935	Claudio R. Sandoval
1st National Assembly; 1935–1938	Claudio R. Sandoval
2nd National Assembly; 1938–1941	Claudio R. Sandoval
1st Commonwealth Congress; 1945	Sofronio Española
1st Congress; 1946–1949	Sofronio Española
2nd Congress; 1949–1953	Gaudencio E. Abordo (Note: Replaced by Sofronio Española as per House of Representatives Electoral Tribunal decision on March 6, 1953.)
2nd Congress; 1949–1953	Sofronio Española
3rd Congress; 1953–1957	Gaudencio E. Abordo
4th Congress; 1957–1961	Gaudencio E. Abordo
5th Congress; 1961–1965	Gaudencio E. Abordo
6th Congress; 1965–1969	Ramon V. Mitra, Jr. (Note: Elected to the Senate in 1971.)
7th Congress; 1969–1972	Ramon V. Mitra, Jr.
7th Congress; 1969–1972	vacant

=== At-Large (defunct) ===
==== 1898–1899 ====
Period	Representatives
Malolos Congress; 1898–1899	Felipe Calderón
Malolos Congress; 1898–1899	Domingo Colmenar

==== 1943–1944 ====
Period	Representative
National Assembly; 1943–1944	Iñigo R. Peña
National Assembly; 1943–1944	Patricio Fernandez (ex officio)

==== 1984–1986 ====
Period	Representative
Regular Batasang Pambansa; 1984–1986	Ramon V. Mitra, Jr.
