= Legislative districts of Negros Occidental =

Philippine electoral districts

Legislative districts of Negros Occidental.

The legislative districts of Negros Occidental are the representations of the province of Negros Occidental in the various national legislatures of the Philippines. The province is currently represented in the lower house of the Congress of the Philippines through its first, second, third, fourth, fifth, and sixth congressional districts.

== History ==
In 1899, the cities and pueblos of San Carlos, Calatrava, Escalante, Sagay, Cadiz, Manapla, Victorias, and Saravia shall compose the first district. From General Order No. 30, from Office US Military Governor in the Philippine Islands, Manila, P.I. July 22, 1899.

Negros Occidental was divided into three legislative districts from 1907 to 1972, it was redistricted into six legislative districts in 1986. It was part of the representation of Region VI from 1978 to 1984, and from 1984 to 1986 it elected 7 assemblymen at-large. Until 1986, Bacolod was part of its representation.

== Current districts ==
Legislative districts and representatives of Negros Occidental
District	Current Representative		Party	Constituent LGUs	Population (2020)	Area	Map
District	Image	Name	Party	Constituent LGUs	Population (2020)	Area	Map
1st		Jules Ledesma (since 2025); San Carlos City	NPC	List: Calatrava; Escalante; Salvador Benedicto; San Carlos; Toboso	381,716	1,436.59 km²	
2nd		Alfredo Marañon III (since 2022); Sagay City	NUP	List: Cadiz; Manapla; Sagay	362,521	967.77 km²	
3rd		Javi Benitez (since 2025); Victorias City	PFP	List: Enrique B. Magalona; Murcia; Silay; Talisay; Victorias	482,646	942.29 km²	
4th		Jeffrey Ferrer (since 2025); La Carlota City	NUP	List: Bago; La Carlota; Pontevedra; Pulupandan; San Enrique; Valladolid	406,666	750.86 km²	
5th		Dino Yulo (since 2022); Isabela	Lakas	List: Binalbagan; Himamaylan; Hinigaran; Isabela; La Castellana; Moises Padilla	464,026	1,220.00 km²	
6th		Mercedes Alvarez (since 2022); Ilog	NPC	List: Candoni; Cauayan; Hinoba-an; Ilog; Kabankalan; Sipalay	525,597	2,485.03 km²	

== Historical districts ==
=== At-Large (defunct) ===
==== 1943-1944 ====
- Excludes Bacolod

Period	Representative
National Assembly; 1943–1944	Vicente F. Gustilo
National Assembly; 1943–1944	Gil M. Montilla

==== 1984-1986 ====
- Includes Bacolod

Period	Representative
Regular Batasang Pambansa; 1984–1986	Wilson Gamboa
Regular Batasang Pambansa; 1984–1986	Antonio M. Gatuslao
Regular Batasang Pambansa; 1984–1986	Roberto A. Gatuslao
Regular Batasang Pambansa; 1984–1986	Jaime G. Golez
Regular Batasang Pambansa; 1984–1986	Alfredo G. Marañon, Jr.
Regular Batasang Pambansa; 1984–1986	Roberto L. Montelibano
Regular Batasang Pambansa; 1984–1986	Jose Y. Varela, Jr.

== See also ==
- Legislative district of Bacolod
