= Sam Verzosa =

Businessman and politician (born 1982)

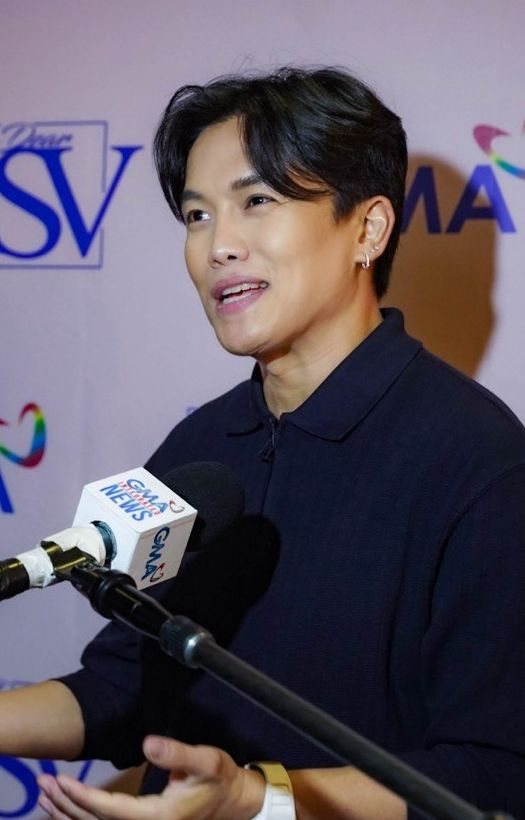
- Verzosa in 2023

Member of the Philippine House of Representatives for Tutok To Win
- In office June 30, 2022 – June 30, 2025
- Preceded by: Post established
- Constituency: Party-list

Personal details
- Born: Samuel Salonga Verzosa Jr. September 12, 1982 (age 44)
- Party: Tutok To Win
- Education: University of the Philippines Diliman (BS)
- Occupation: Businessman

Samuel Salonga Verzosa Jr. (born September 12, 1982) is a Filipino businessman and politician who is known for being the co-founder of the multi-level marketing company, Frontrow. He also served as the representative of the Tutok To Win Party-List in the House of Representatives from 2022 to 2025.

== Early life and education ==
Samuel Verzosa Jr. was born in September 12, 1982. He is the eldest son of five siblings and spent his childhood growing up in Sampaloc. He attended Angelicum College for his elementary and high school studies. On June 14, 1999 as a high schooler, Sam was part of the Angelicum College team that reached the Grand Finals of Battle of the Brains, where they settled for 3rd place behind Manila Science High School (Grand Champion) and The Sisters of Mary School (2nd place).

He earned a bachelor's degree in civil engineering from the University of the Philippines Diliman.

== Career ==
=== Business career ===
Verzosa learned about the direct selling and multi-level marketing (MLM) industries while he was preparing for his engineering board examinations. He joined a direct-selling company, where he met RS Francisco. When the company closed, the two decided to establish Frontrow International in 2009. Frontrow also maintains the E-Skwela program, where the MLM provides Internet and printing hubs for school use in far-flung areas as part of its corporate social responsibility. Frontrow has partnered with the Ang Probinsyano Partylist for this program's implementation.

The business however has been hounded by controversies. For instance, a disgruntled former member reached out to Aksyon sa Radyo program of Raffy Tulfo accused Verzosa and his business partner of scamming him.

Frontrow also sponsored Willie Revillame's Tutok to Win program. Revillame is a close friend of Verzosa. Frontrow is also a partner of the Miss Universe Organization.

Verzosa also manages the Modena Motorsports company, which distributes Maserati cars in the Philippines. He is also a part-owner of the Manila Batang Sampaloc basketball team.

=== Political career ===
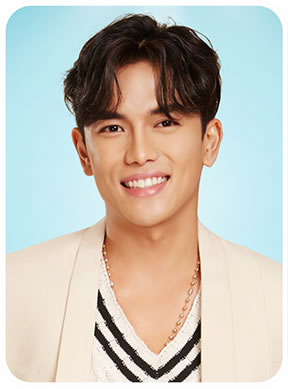
Official portrait for the 19th Congress.

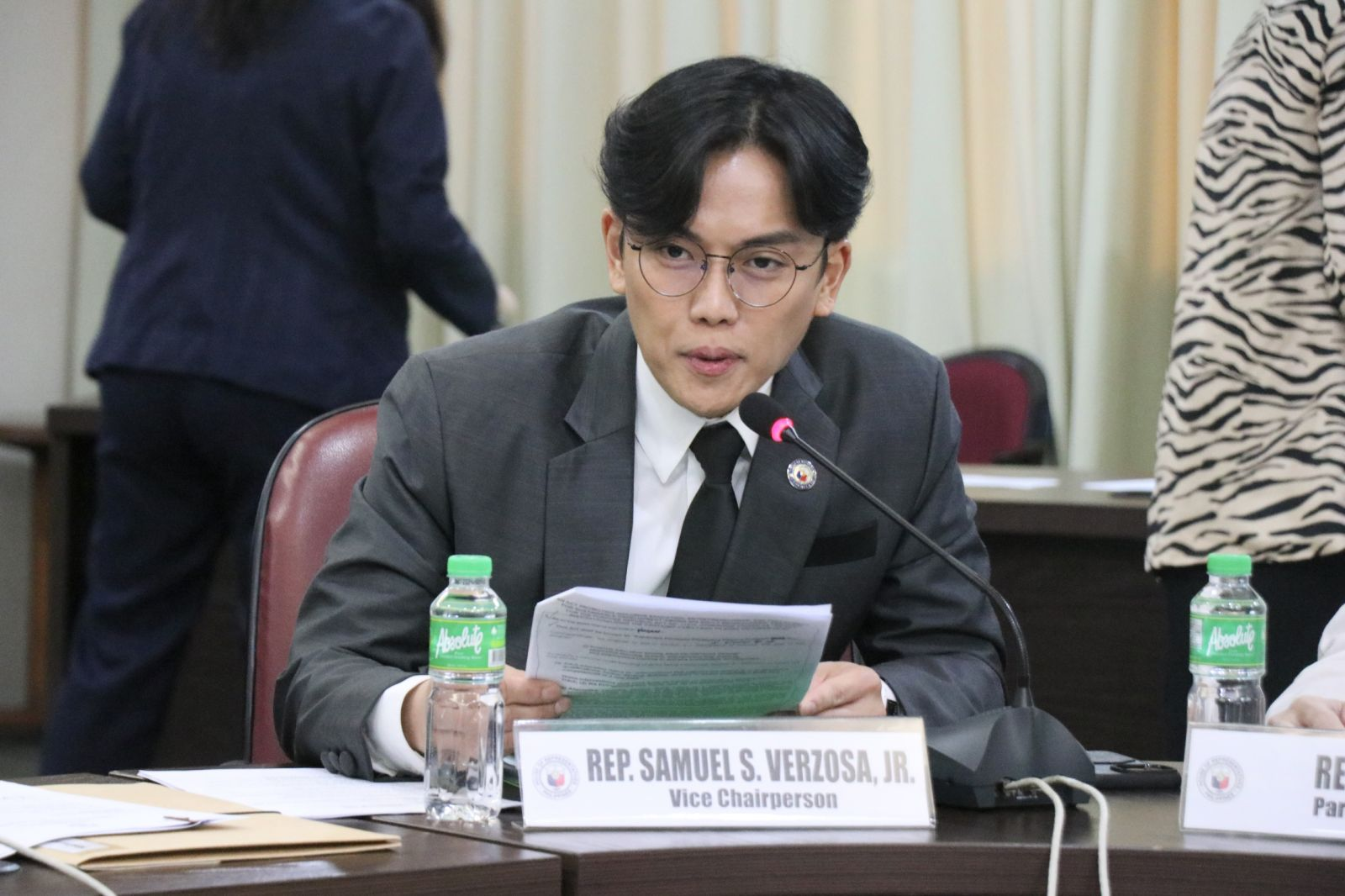
Verzosa speaks at the third meeting of the House Committee on Poverty Alleviation in 2023.

Verzosa was named as the first nominee of the Tutok To Win Party-List for the 2022 elections. The organization managed to win a seat.

As a House representative for the 19th Congress, Verzosa became vice chairman of the Poverty Alleviation, Socual Services, Welfare of Children, and Disaster Resilience committees. Among his bills filed are the Poor Job Applicants Discount Act, which seeks to provide a 20 percent discount to government-issued pre-employment documents for indigent jobseekers, and the E-Skwela Act which aims to institutionalize Frontrow's E-Skwela program under the government.

On October 6, 2024, Verzosa filed his candidacy to run for Mayor of Manila in 2025 as an independent candidate (under the name 'Team SV Manila'). Some of his priority programs, if elected, were to boost the healthcare and educational needs of Manileños. However, he lost to former Mayor Isko Moreno, placing third in the mayoral race of the 2025 Manila local elections, garnering only 164,434 votes or 18.28% of the total. Verzosa conceded defeat on the same day via social media.

Tutok to Win, which fielded seven of Verzosa's relatives among its ten nominees, aimed to retain a seat in 2025 but later failed to secure a seat in the 20th Congress of the Philippines.

=== Television ===
Verzosa is the presenter of the public service series Dear SV which features stories from various Filipino individuals. Its pilot episode aired in February 2023 on CNN Philippines. The series returned on GMA Network premiering on November 18, 2023.

Following Revillame's return to television via TV5, he became a co-host of Wil To Win.

== Libel case against Star Elamparo ==
In November 2024, Verzosa filed a libel case with the Manila City Prosecutor's Office against Daily Tribune columnist Estrella "Star" C. Elamparo for alleged fake news publication ("Celebrities and cheating at NYCM?") implying that he and Ramos cheated in their participation at the New York City Marathon. She also faces a Cebu City arrest warrant for a separate defamation case.

In her original column, Elamparo—drawing on publicly available records, reports, and her contacts in the running community—pointed out alleged discrepancies without making any direct accusations of misconduct on Verzosa's behalf. She has further clarified her position with caveats in a follow-up column. She clarified that she did not outright claim the couple cheated and "only raised the possibility" of such

The current status of Verzosa's complaint remains unclear. Meanwhile, an earlier cyber libel charge against Ellamparo – related to her earlier legal obligations as a leading litigator and former prosecutor - has already been dismissed by the Department of Justice for lack of merit. According to a resolution by the Department of Justice (NPS Docket No. VII-INV- 23E-01311 P.5, Pa III, dated Nov 28, 2024): "the most important element of libel or cyberlibel, which is the existence of malice, was not established..."

== Personal life ==
Verzosa had actress Rhian Ramos as his girlfriend. He first publicized his relationship with Ramos in August 2022. In March 2026, Ramos said they had already broken up in October last year. Verzosa likewise had earlier described himself as single and not looking for a new relationship.

== Electoral history ==
Electoral history of Sam Verzosa
| Year | Office | Party | Votes received | | | | Result |
| Year | Office | Party | Total | % | P. | Swing | Result |
|---|---|---|---|---|---|---|---|
| 2022 | Representative (Party-list) | Tutok to Win | 685,578 | 1.88% | 9th | —N/a | Won |
| 2025 | Mayor of Manila | Independent | 164,434 | 18.28% | 3rd | —N/a | Lost |

== Awards and nominations ==
In November 2024, Verzosa received the Gusi Peace Prize at the Manila Metropolitan Theater, with the organizers citing his philanthropy. He is the youngest Filipino to be given the award. The organizers recognized for his philanthropy.
