= Philippine House Committee on Cooperatives Development =

Standing committee of the House of Representatives of the Philippines

Committee on Cooperatives Development
- 20th Congress

History
- New session started: July 28, 2025

Leadership
- Chair: Felimon Espares, Coop‑NATCCO since July 30, 2025
- Minority Leader: Vacant since June 30, 2025

Website
- Committee on Cooperatives Development

The Philippine House Committee on Cooperatives Development, or House Cooperatives Development Committee is a standing committee of the Philippine House of Representatives.

== Jurisdiction ==
As prescribed by House Rules, the committee's jurisdiction includes the following:

- Cooperatives inclusive of cooperative movements and organizations
- Electric cooperatives registered with the Cooperative Development Authority
- Implementation or amendment of the Cooperative Code of the Philippines
- Urban and rural-based credit, consumer, producers, marketing, service and multi-purpose cooperatives

== Members, 20th Congress ==
Position	Member	Constituency	Party
Chairperson	Felimon Espares	Party-list	Coop‑NATCCO
Vice Chairpersons	Vacant		
Members for the Majority	Vacant		
Members for the Minority	Vacant		

== Historical membership rosters ==
=== 18th Congress ===
Position	Members	Party	Province/City	District
Chairperson	Presley De Jesus	PHILRECA	Party-list	
Vice Chairpersons	Jose Ong Jr.	NUP	Northern Samar	2nd
Vice Chairpersons	Jose Gay Padiernos	GP	Party-list	
Vice Chairpersons	Virgilio Lacson	MANILA TEACHERS	Party-list	
Vice Chairpersons	Adriano Ebcas	AKO PADAYON	Party-list	
Members for the Majority	Rico Geron	AGAP	Party-list	
Members for the Majority	Wilfredo Caminero	NUP	Cebu	2nd
Members for the Majority	Diego Ty	NUP	Misamis Occidental	1st
Members for the Majority	Fernando Cabredo	PDP–Laban	Albay	3rd
Members for the Majority	Janice Salimbangon	NUP	Cebu	4th
Members for the Majority	Rashidin Matba	PDP–Laban	Tawi-Tawi	Lone
Members for the Majority	Teodorico Haresco Jr.	Nacionalista	Aklan	2nd
Members for the Minority	Godofredo Guya	RECOBODA	Party-list	
Members for the Minority	Sergio Dagooc	APEC	Party-list	

==== Chairperson ====
- Sabiniano Canama (COOP-NATCCO) September 17, 2019 – December 14, 2020

== See also ==
- House of Representatives of the Philippines
- List of Philippine House of Representatives committees
