= Brian Poe Llamanzares =

Filipino philanthropist, entrepreneur, and public servant (born 1992)

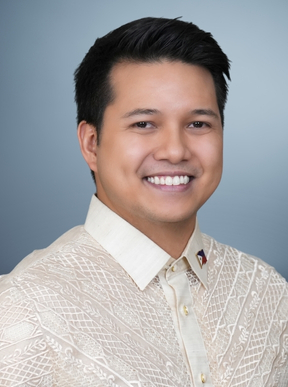
- Official portrait, 2025

Assistant Majority Leader of the House of Representatives of the Philippines
- Incumbent
- Assumed office July 29, 2025 Serving with several others
- Leader: Sandro Marcos

Member of the Philippine House of Representatives for FPJ Panday Bayanihan
- Incumbent
- Assumed office June 30, 2025
- Preceded by: Title established

Personal details
- Born: Brian Daniel Poe Llamanzares; April 16, 1992 (age 34) United States
- Citizenship: Philippines; United States (renounced by 2025)
- Spouse: Margarita Gutierrez (m. 2026)
- Parent: Grace Poe (mother)
- Relatives: Fernando Poe Jr. (grandfather); Susan Roces (grandmother); Lovi Poe (half-aunt); Merceditas Gutierrez (mother-in-law)
- Education: Ateneo de Manila University (AB, 2013); Columbia University (MA, 2018); University of Perpetual Help System DALTA (DPA, 2022); National Defense College of the Philippines (MNSA, 2024)
- Occupation: Businessman; journalist; philanthropist; politician
- Website: brianpoe.org

Brian Daniel Poe Llamanzares (born April 16, 1992) is a Filipino politician, businessman, journalist, and civic leader serving as the representative for the FPJ Panday Bayanihan Party-list in the House of Representatives of the Philippines since June 30, 2025. He concurrently serves as an Assistant House Majority Leader in the 20th Congress of the Philippines.

Llamanzares is the only son of former senator Grace Poe and businessman Neil Llamanzares, and the grandson of National Artist and Filipino film actor Fernando Poe Jr. and actress Susan Roces. Prior to his election, he served as a television journalist at CNN Philippines, as campaign manager for his mother's senatorial and presidential campaigns, and as her chief of staff in the Senate of the Philippines from 2019 to 2024.

He is also a published author, having written A Sustainable Future (2022), a national bestseller on sustainability, climate policy, and economic development in the Philippines. He is additionally a commissioned officer in the Armed Forces of the Philippines Reserve Force, holding the rank of Lieutenant Colonel.

== Early life and education ==
Brian Daniel Poe Llamanzares was born in the United States on April 16, 1992. He is the only son of Grace Poe and businessman Neil Llamanzares, who also had two daughters. His maternal grandparents were the Filipino film actors Fernando Poe Jr. and Susan Roces. Fernando Poe Jr., his grandfather, was posthumously declared a National Artist for Film, and had once campaigned for the Philippine presidency in 2004.

He earned a Bachelor of Arts degree in political science from Ateneo de Manila University in 2013, graduating as a Model Graduating Student for the School of Social Sciences. In 2018, he completed a Master of Arts in Climate and Society at Columbia University in New York. While at Columbia, he also completed the "Leadership in Crisis" program at Harvard Kennedy School and pursued studies in Conference Diplomacy and Multilateral Negotiations at the United Nations in Geneva.

Llamanzares later obtained a Doctor of Philosophy in Public Administration from the University of Perpetual Help System DALTA in 2022. In June 2024, he graduated from the National Defense College of the Philippines with a Master in National Security Administration (MNSA).

His specialized training includes executive education programs at Harvard Kennedy School, the Massachusetts Institute of Technology, Stanford University, and the Wharton School of the University of Pennsylvania. In 2024, he completed a counterintelligence course with the National Intelligence Coordinating Agency (NICA).

== Journalism and writing ==
Llamanzares began his professional career as part of the pioneer reporting team of CNN Philippines, where he worked as a television reporter covering national affairs and public policy. During his time in journalism, he received the Outstanding Television Reporter Award from the Volunteers Against Crime and Corruption (VACC) in 2015 for his work in media and public information. He also received a journalism award for his investigative reporting on the conditions of Filipino overseas workers.

In 2022, Llamanzares published the book A Sustainable Future, which discusses sustainability, climate policy, and economic development in the Philippines (ISBN 978-6219663533). The book became a national bestseller and was recognized as the first bestseller published by the Manila Bulletin's publishing division. Following its publication, Llamanzares delivered lectures on sustainability and governance at universities and institutions in the Philippines and abroad, including Ivy League universities, the National University of Singapore, and events organized by the Philippine Embassy in New York.

Since 2024, Llamanzares has written a weekly Sunday opinion column titled Best Practices for The Philippine Star, where he addresses governance, technology policy, economic development, and public administration.

== Public service ==
Llamanzares played a pivotal role as campaign coordinator during the senatorial campaign of his mother, Grace Poe, helping her win a Senate seat in 2013 with the highest number of votes in Philippine history at the time. He later served as campaign manager for her successful 2019 re-election bid. In July 2019, he was appointed as chief of staff of Senator Grace Poe, a role he held until 2024, making him the youngest chief of staff in the Philippine Senate at the time.

Amid the COVID-19 pandemic, Llamanzares co-founded FPJ Panday Bayanihan, a non-governmental organization focused on providing relief and medical assistance to Filipinos in need.

== Legislative career ==
Llamanzares was elected to the House of Representatives of the Philippines in the 2025 Philippine party-list elections as the first nominee of the FPJ Panday Bayanihan Party-list. He assumed office on June 30, 2025. On July 29, 2025, he was named Assistant Majority Leader under Ilocos Norte's 1st district representative Sandro Marcos.

During his first six months in the House of Representatives, Llamanzares filed 129 bills and resolutions, including 110 principally authored measures and 19 co-authored proposals. By the end of 2025, eleven of his authored bills had passed third reading in the House, including House Bill No. 6262, the Philippine Blue Economy Act, and House Bill No. 6789, the Department of Water Resources Act.

His legislative work has focused on agricultural modernization, artificial intelligence policy, workforce development, digital infrastructure, and transparency in governance. Among his proposed measures are the Binhi ng Pag-asa Program Act, which seeks to promote youth participation in agriculture through technology-driven training, and the Food Security and Sovereignty Act, aimed at strengthening national agricultural production and distribution systems.

In the field of technology and digital policy, Llamanzares introduced the Philippine Artificial Intelligence Governance Act, which proposes the creation of an Artificial Intelligence Development Authority to oversee national artificial intelligence policy. He also authored the Open Access in Data Transmission Act, intended to liberalize the telecommunications data transmission sector and expand digital infrastructure access. The bill passed third reading in December 2025.

Llamanzares has also raised concerns about the potential impact of artificial intelligence on the Philippine economy, particularly on the country's business process outsourcing (BPO) sector. During a February 2026 hearing of the Committee on Economic Affairs, he warned that advances in automation could disrupt employment in an industry that employs more than one million Filipino workers. He called for proactive policy adjustments, including workforce retraining programs, infrastructure reforms in economic zones, and national investment strategies. He linked these concerns to his proposed Career Transitions Act, which seeks to establish government-supported programs for skills training, job placement, and career mobility for workers affected by technological disruption.

He has likewise introduced measures focused on transparency and governance, including the Citizens Access and Disclosure of Expenditures for National Accountability (CADENA) Act, which proposes the use of blockchain technology for public monitoring of government expenditures, and the Freedom and Protection of Journalists Act, which seeks to strengthen protections for journalists and reform provisions on criminal libel.

Other measures he principally authored that passed third reading in the House in 2025 include the Private Basic Education Voucher Program Act, the Last Mile Schools Act, the Informal Settler Families Resettlement Act, the New Philippine Building Act, and amendments to the charters of the University of Science and Technology of the Philippines and Capiz State University. He was also among the authors of the General Appropriations Act of 2025.

=== Committee assignments ===
Llamanzares serves as an Assistant Majority Leader under the Committee on Rules of the House of Representatives. He also holds several vice-chairmanships, including in the Committees on Appropriations, Agriculture and Food, Economic Affairs, Justice, National Defense and Security, and Public Information.

He sits as a member of several additional committees, including those on Transportation, Health, Higher and Technical Education, Climate Change, Creative Industries, and Nuclear Energy. In 2025, he attended 111 committee meetings and participated in deliberations on national budget allocations, including plenary defenses for the budgets of the Department of Information and Communications Technology and the National Amnesty Commission.

On October 6, 2025, he was elected Deputy Secretary-General of the Party-list Coalition Foundation Inc. in the House of Representatives.

== Military and defense work ==
=== Commission and rank ===
In September 2025, Llamanzares was commissioned as a Lieutenant Colonel in the reserve force of the Armed Forces of the Philippines (AFP). He vowed to use his position to actively support the AFP's mandate, particularly in the areas of reservist reform, defense modernization, and national readiness.

His great-grandfather, Fernando Poe Sr., also served in the Philippine Army Reserve as a First Lieutenant during World War II, participated in the Bataan Death March, and ultimately reached the rank of Captain before retiring from military service. Fernando Poe Sr. was awarded the Gold Cross Medal for his service.

=== Multisectoral Advisory Board of the AFP Reserve Command ===
Llamanzares serves as Chairman of the Communications Multisectoral Advisory Board (MSAB) of the Philippine Army Reserve Command. The MSAB was established to bring together civilian and sectoral leaders to help the Reserve Command develop and modernize the reservist force. Llamanzares has served alongside fellow board member Matteo Guidicelli in this capacity.

In his role with the MSAB, Llamanzares donated polo shirts and eyeglasses for the Reserve Command force and expressed support for preserving the history of the Philippine Reserve Force, including the establishment of a military museum honoring the contributions of past reservists. He also led the first-ever FPJ Shoot for a Cause invitational shooting competition at Camp Aguinaldo firing range, gathering 165 participants from the AFP and the Philippine National Police, with proceeds donated to the Hero Foundation, which provides educational support to military orphans.

=== Defense advocacy and legislative support ===
Llamanzares has been a vocal advocate for the welfare and modernization of the AFP in the House of Representatives. He backed the Department of National Defense's budget of ₱295.18 billion, emphasizing the importance of solid modernization programs and reforms to the reservist system. He has stated that the pension of uniformed personnel is uncompromisable and has consistently defended funding for the AFP during budget deliberations in Congress.

As tensions in the West Philippine Sea escalated in 2026, Llamanzares led the turnover of training equipment — including airsoft rifles, handguns, and pistols — to the Philippine Army Reserve Command, describing the contribution as a reaffirmation of shared commitment to preparedness, discipline, and national service. He also facilitated the donation of doxycycline antibiotics to the AFP amid a leptospirosis threat affecting military personnel and reservists.

He previously served as an adviser to the Aviation Security Group of the Philippine National Police.

=== Philippine Coast Guard Auxiliary ===
On May 21, 2026, Llamanzares was formally inducted as an Auxiliary Commodore of the Philippine Coast Guard Auxiliary Executive Squadron during a donning of ranks and oath-taking ceremony held at the National Headquarters of the Philippine Coast Guard in Manila. The ceremony was attended by former Senator Grace Poe and Department of Justice Undersecretary Margarita Gutierrez. Welcoming remarks were delivered by PCG Vice Admiral Hostillo Arturo Cornelio, while PCG Commandant Admiral Ronnie Gil Gavan led the official donning of ranks and administered the oath of membership.

In his remarks, Commandant Gavan welcomed Llamanzares into what he described as a family that has long stood watch over the nation's waters, noting that the Auxiliary is proud to have gained a young Filipino leader who chooses to show up, and paying tribute to the legacy of National Artist Fernando Poe Jr. and the public service of former Senator Grace Poe.

Llamanzares connected his induction with his broader legislative advocacy for marine biodiversity protection, fisheries sustainability, and the blue economy. He noted that the country's ocean economy generated approximately ₱1.01 trillion in 2024, equivalent to 3.8 percent of the national gross domestic product, while supporting an estimated 2.39 million jobs nationwide. He also expressed strong support for the proposed Revised Philippine Coast Guard Law (House Bill No. 11433) during a hearing of the House Committee on Transportation. Llamanzares argued that strengthening the PCG goes beyond transportation policy, touching on national security, disaster resilience, and food security, and called for the agency to be given adequate resources and training to address longstanding gaps in manpower, modernization, and operational reach.

== Humanitarian and civic initiatives ==
Llamanzares leads socio-civic initiatives through the FPJ Panday Bayanihan organization, which conducts disaster response and community service programs. The organization, named after his grandfather Fernando Poe Jr.'s iconic film Ang Panday, began organizing relief operations in 2013 when Typhoon Maring struck, and has since extended assistance through Typhoon Yolanda, the Marawi siege, the 2020 Taal volcanic eruption, and other calamities. Initiatives have included the distribution of relief supplies, water, tents, and medical assistance to communities affected by typhoons and the 2025 earthquake in Cebu.

He has also supported public health and social welfare programs. As outreach chairperson of the Party-List Coalition Foundation Inc., he helped launch the Batang Malusog program, which provides meals, vitamins, and educational materials to public school students. In Dagupan City, he organized the Katarungan Caravan, which provides free legal consultation and employment assistance to residents.

Llamanzares co-founded the Global AI Council Philippines, where he served as chairman, and the Blockchain Council of the Philippines, where he previously chaired the Committee on Youth and Education. He currently serves as a trustee of both organizations.

== Personal life ==
Llamanzares married Department of Justice undersecretary Margarita Gutierrez, the daughter of former justice secretary and Ombudsman Merceditas Gutierrez, on September 8, 2026, in a ceremony at Santuario de San Jose in Mandaluyong.

== Awards and recognition ==
Llamanzares has received numerous awards recognizing his contributions to journalism, public service, humanitarian work, and entrepreneurship.

In the field of journalism, he received the Outstanding Television Reporter Award from the Volunteers Against Crime and Corruption (VACC) in 2015 for his reporting on national affairs during his time at CNN Philippines.

In 2016, he was recognized by Lifestyle Asia magazine as one of its 10 Game Changers, a list celebrating young individuals who use their influence to create change in Philippine society.

In 2020, PeopleAsia magazine named him among its "Men Who Matter" awardees, recognizing him in his capacity as a businessman, Habitat for Humanity volunteer, and the youngest chief of staff in the Philippine Senate at the time.

In 2023, he was honored at the UAE Next Mastermind Awards in Dubai, where he received the Authors Award for his book A Sustainable Future. The same year, his company Pantheon Holdings was recognized as the Fastest Growing Company at the Burj CEO Awards 2023 in the United Arab Emirates.

In 2024, he received the Asia's Humanitarian Distinction award at the Asia Modern Hero Awards held at Okada Manila, recognizing over a decade of disaster relief efforts led through FPJ Panday Bayanihan. Llamanzares was honored alongside Senator Joel Villanueva, National Security Advisor Secretary Eduardo Año, and the Commanding General of the Philippine Army, Lt. General Roy M. Galido.

Also in 2024, he was awarded the International Golden Seal of Merit and Excellence Award (IGSMEA) for his dedicated leadership in community service and community empowerment. As part of the award, a donation was made in Llamanzares's name to the Josefheim Foundation in Pililla, and to the Center for Health Improvement and Life Development Haus (C.H.I.L.D Haus) in Paco, Manila.

The Harvard Kennedy School Alumni Association of the Philippines has also recognized Llamanzares among its members in public service.

He has been recognized by Tatler Asia as part of its Generation T list of young leaders shaping Asia's future, and has been featured in Esquire Philippines, Lifestyle Asia, and other regional publications.

== Legacy and commemorations ==
Llamanzares has supported initiatives aimed at preserving the legacy of his grandfather, Fernando Poe Jr., as well as commemorating the contributions of earlier members of the Poe family to Philippine cinema and public life. On December 14, 2025, he organized the event "FPJ Lives On: The Unveiling and Legacy Concert" in San Carlos, Pangasinan, which featured the public unveiling of a monument dedicated to Fernando Poe Jr. on his 21st death anniversary.

In October 2025, Llamanzares attended the unveiling of a statue commemorating Fernando Poe Sr. at a newly established firing range within Camp Riego de Dios, inaugurated by the Philippine Army Reserve Command. Fernando Poe Sr. was awarded the Gold Cross Medal for his military service and is recognized as a pioneer in early Philippine cinema.
