= Jose Ping-ay =

Filipino politician (1950–2020)

Jose R. Ping-ay
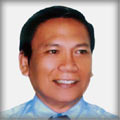
- Official portrait, 2010

Member of the Philippine House of Representatives from Coop-NATCCO Partylist
- In office January 19, 2009 – June 30, 2013
- Preceded by: Guillermo Cua
- Succeeded by: Cresente Paez

Vice Mayor of Santa Cruz, Ilocos Sur
- In office June 30, 2001 – June 30, 2004

Member of the Ilocos Sur Provincial Board from the 2nd District
- In office June 30, 1995 – June 30, 1998

Personal details
- Born: April 13, 1950 Santa Cruz, Ilocos Sur, Philippines
- Died: September 18, 2020 (aged 70)
- Spouse: Victoria B. Ping-ay
- Children: Waldimar Niño Ping-ay, Veejay Ping-ay, Lorie Ping-ay Grapa & 4 others
- Education: Saint Louis University
- Profession: Engineer, Businessman, Politician

Jose Ragandap Ping-ay (April 13, 1950 – September 18, 2020) is the patriarch of Ping-ay Family and was a Filipino politician who was a partylist representative of Coop-NATCCO in the 14th and 15th Congress, vice mayor of Santa Cruz, and a member of the Sangguniang Panlalawigan (Provincial Legislature) of Ilocos Sur.

== Biography ==
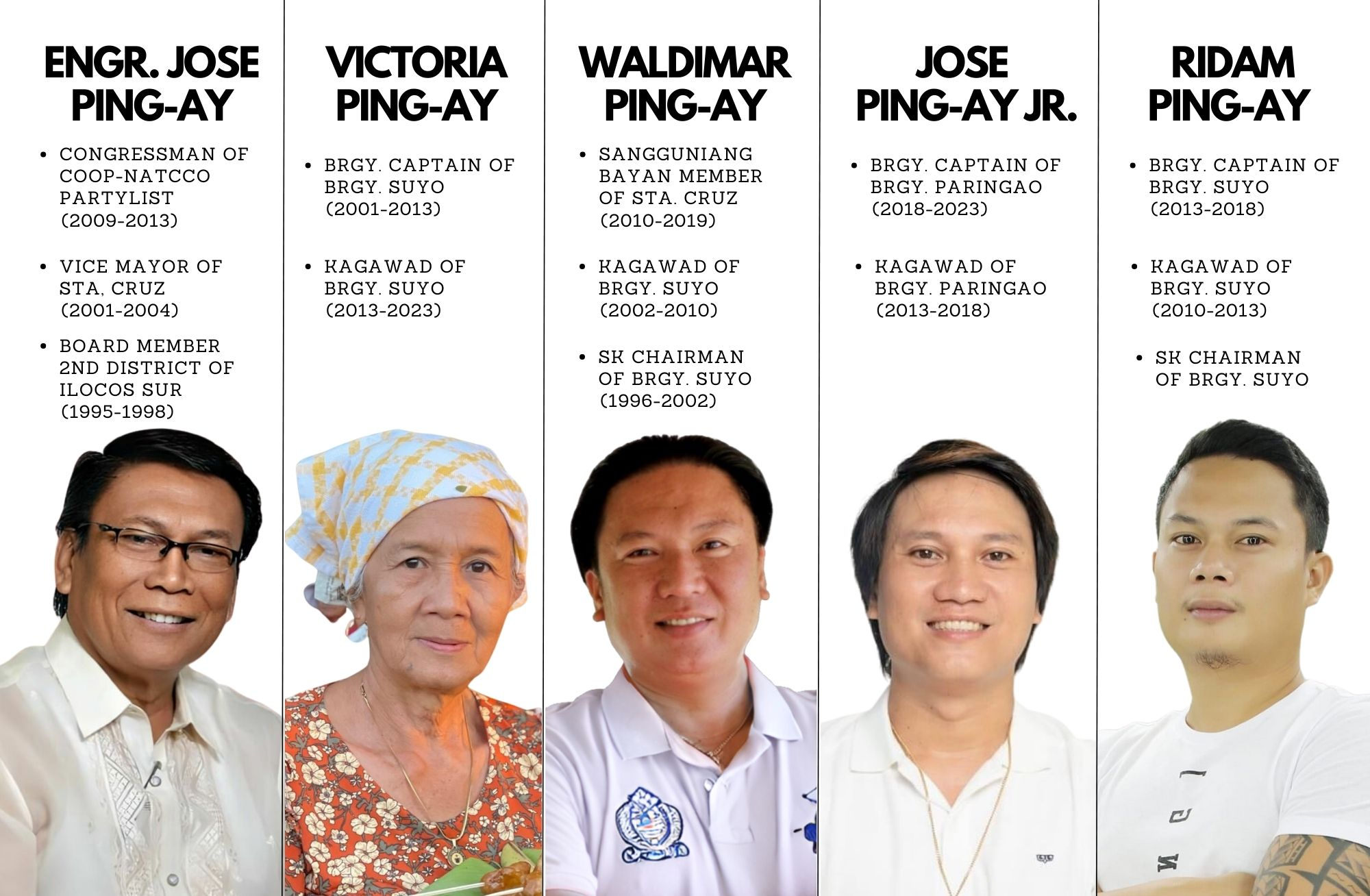
Ping-ay Family of Ilocos Sur

Jose Ping-ay was born on June 13, 1950, in Santa Cruz, Ilocos Sur. He is the eldest among the three children. He studied in Saint Louis University in Baguio City and become a civil engineer by profession. He is the proprietor and General Manager of Jose R. Ping-ay Agri-Trading and Jose R. Ping-ay Engineering and Construction.

He earned his Bachelor of Science in Civil Engineering degree at Saint Louis University in 1972 and was awarded Most Outstanding Group Coordinator when he completed a special course in urban and regional planning at the University of the Philippines in 1978.

== Political career ==
Ping-ay served as Provincial Board member of 2nd District of Ilocos Sur from 1995 to 1998 and vice mayor of his hometown from 2001 to 2004. The municipality of Santa Cruz has seen and experienced the last election with the incumbents having an opponent on the election of 2004 with Jose R. Ping-ay running as mayor. After that, the incumbents were unopposed for the next five consecutive elections. It took another almost two decades for another Ping-ay to run against them with his son Waldimar Ping-ay for the election of 2022. He took over as COOP-NATCCO's representative in Congress after Guillermo Cua of Cagayan de Oro City died in December 2009. Ping-ay was sworn into office in January 2009. In the May election of 2010, he ran for re-election as Partlylist Representative of Coop-Natcco. The party garnered 944, 864, or 3.42% of the overall votes, and at 6th place in over 178 participating parties. The party won 2 seats in Congress.

== Other work ==
Ping-ay led the Sta. Cruz Savings and Development Cooperative (SACDECO) which he chairs into a P236 million enterprise with five branches is a far cry from its petty status when it began in 1984 with P5,000 capital. Ping-ay previously served as a member of the Board of National Confederation of Cooperatives (NATCCO) for two years before he was elected as chairperson of the board. During his term as chairperson in 2008 NATCCO reached the landmark first Billion in Assets, thus earning him the title "Action Man". From 2006 up to 2009, Ping-ay is also the chairperson of the board and Founder of Ilocos Sur Cooperative Bank. Prior to it, he was ISCB's vice-chairperson. He was also the chairperson of the Board of Sta. Cruz Savings and Development Cooperative from 1989 to 1992 and again in 2005 to 2013. Similarly, he served as chairperson of the Board of NORLU-AGRI Marketing Cooperative from 1989 to 1992 and Northern Luzon Cooperative Development Center from 1990 to 1992. In 1989, he founded and chaired the board of Ilocos Sur Federation of Cooperatives until 1995. He too held other management positions as Vice Chairperson in Ilocos Sur Electric Cooperative and the National Confederation of Cooperatives.
