= Philippine House Special Committee on Bases Conversion =

Special committee of the House of Representatives of the Philippines

Special Committee on Bases Conversion
- 20th Congress

History
- New session started: July 28, 2025

Leadership
- Chairman: Vacant since June 30, 2025
- Minority Leader: Vacant since June 30, 2025

Website
- Special Committee on Bases Conversion

The Philippine House Special Committee on Bases Conversion is a special committee of the Philippine House of Representatives.

== Jurisdiction ==
As prescribed by House Rules, the committee's jurisdiction includes the following:

- Construction of new military camps
- Operation of special economic zones in former military bases
- Policies and programs relating to bases conversion
- Relocation of military camps and personnel
- Sale of military camps and disposition of proceeds thereof

== Members, 20th Congress ==
As of June 30, 2025, all committee membership positions are vacant.

== Historical membership rosters ==
=== 18th Congress ===
Position	Members	Party	Province/City	District
Chairperson	Aurelio Gonzales Jr.	PDP–Laban	Pampanga	3rd
Vice Chairpersons	Ma. Laarni Cayetano	Nacionalista	Taguig–Pateros	2nd
Vice Chairpersons	Carmelo Lazatin II	PDP–Laban	Pampanga	1st
Vice Chairpersons	Victor Yap	NPC	Tarlac	2nd
Vice Chairpersons	Juan Pablo Bondoc	PDP–Laban	Pampanga	4th
Vice Chairpersons	Geraldine Roman	PDP–Laban	Bataan	1st
Members for the Majority	Sonny Lagon	Ako Bisaya	Party-list	
Members for the Majority	Joey Salceda	PDP–Laban	Albay	2nd
Members for the Majority	Mark Go	Nacionalista	Baguio	Lone
Members for the Majority	Antonio Albano	NUP	Isabela	1st
Members for the Majority	Carlos Cojuangco	NPC	Tarlac	1st
Members for the Majority	Lorna Silverio	NUP	Bulacan	3rd
Members for the Majority	Rolando Valeriano	NUP	Manila	2nd
Members for the Majority	John Marvin Nieto	NUP	Manila	3rd
Members for the Majority	Braeden John Biron	Nacionalista	Iloilo	4th
Members for the Majority	Josephine Ramirez-Sato	Liberal	Occidental Mindoro	Lone
Members for the Majority	Luis Ferrer IV	NUP	Cavite	6th
Members for the Majority	Julienne Baronda	NUP	Iloilo City	Lone
Members for the Minority	Ferdinand Gaite	Bayan Muna	Party-list	
Members for the Minority	Alex Advincula	NUP	Cavite	3rd

==== Chairperson ====
- Francis Gerald Abaya (Cavite–1st, Liberal) August 14, 2019 – October 12, 2020

==== Member for the Majority ====
- Francisco Datol Jr. (Note: Died on August 10, 2020.) (SENIOR CITIZENS)

== See also ==
- House of Representatives of the Philippines
- List of Philippine House of Representatives committees
- Bases Conversion and Development Authority
