= Francis Gerald Abaya =

Filipino architect and politician

The Honorable Francis Gerald Abaya

Member of the Philippine House of Representatives from Cavite's 1st district
- In office June 30, 2013 – June 30, 2022
- Preceded by: Joseph Emilio Abaya
- Succeeded by: Jolo Revilla

Personal details
- Born: September 15, 1975 (age 51) Pasay, Rizal, Philippines
- Party: Liberal (2012–present); Magdalo (local party; 2012–present)
- Relations: Emilio Aguinaldo (great-grandfather)
- Education: Wentworth Institute of Technology

Francis Gerald "Boy Blue" Aguinaldo Abaya (born September 15, 1975) is a Filipino politician and architect who served as the Representative of Cavite's 1st district from 2013 to 2022.

== Early life and education ==
Abaya was born on September 15, 1975, to Plaridel Abaya, a former congressman, and Consuelo Aguinaldo-Abaya, granddaughter of the first President of the Philippines Emilio Aguinaldo. He is also the brother of former congressman and Secretary of Transportation and Communications Joseph Emilio Abaya.

In 2002, Abaya graduated from Wentworth Institute of Technology in Boston, Massachusetts with a bachelor's degree in architecture. He passed the Architectural Board Examination administered by the Professional Regulation Commission that same year.

== Early career ==
Before his political career, Abaya worked in the field of architecture serving as the Resident Architect of various construction and real estate companies. He also taught architecture at the De La Salle University – Dasmariñas for several years.

== Political career ==
Abaya entered politics in 2013 when he ran as congressman for Cavite's 1st District under the Liberal Party. The seat was vacant since October 2012 due to the resignation of his brother, Joseph Emilio Abaya, to serve as Transportation Secretary. Abaya won the seat gaining 94,283 votes or 67.96% of the total valid votes cast. In the 16th Congress, he was the vice-chairman of the House Committee on Information and Communications Technology; and assistant majority leader of the Committee on Rules. He also authored and filed a bill that would reinstate the mandatory Reserve Officers' Training Corps in all colleges and universities.

In the 2016 general elections, Abaya ran again for a second term as congressman and won. He also helped in the presidential campaign of Liberal Party candidate Mar Roxas. In the 17th Congress, he served as the vice-chairman of the House Committees on Climate Change, Information and Communications Technology, and Science and Technology.

Abaya ran again in the 2019 House of Representatives elections and won with 78.56% of his district's votes. In the 18th Congress, Abaya served as the chairman of the House Special Committee on Bases Conversion; vice-chairman of the Committees on Climate Change, Information and Communications Technology, and Science and Technology; and member of the Committees on Government Enterprises and Privatization, Housing and Urban Development, and Social Services. He was among the 12 members of the opposition Liberal Party that joined the “Super Majority Coalition” of the House of Representatives dominated by allies of President Rodrigo Duterte.

== Personal life ==
Abaya is married to a physician Nadia Khoo-Abaya and they have 3 children.

He is a member of the United Architects of the Philippines and a fellow at the Philippine Institute for Architects.

== Electoral history ==
Electoral history of Francis Gerald Abaya
Year	Office	Party	Votes received				Result
Year	Office	Party	Total	%	P.	Swing	Result
2013	Representative (Cavite–1st)	Liberal	94,283	76.67%	1st	—N/a	Won
2016	Representative (Cavite–1st)	Liberal	114,700	86.50%	1st	+9.83	Won
2019	Representative (Cavite–1st)	Liberal	117,031	89.28%	1st	+2.78	Won
2022	Mayor of Kawit	Liberal	22,619	46.76%	2nd	—N/a	Lost
2025	Mayor of Kawit	Liberal	24,258	47.44%	2nd	+0.68	Lost
