= Philippine House Committee on Social Services =

Standing committee of the House of Representatives of the Philippines

Committee on Social Services
- 20th Congress

History
- New session started: To convene on July 28, 2025

Leadership
- Chairman: Vacant
- Minority Leader: Vacant

Website
- Committee on Social Services

The Philippine House Committee on Social Services, or House Social Services Committee is a standing committee of the Philippine House of Representatives.

== Jurisdiction ==
As prescribed by House Rules, the committee's jurisdiction is on the social development and social services and interventions that will enhance and develop the life of the community and individual.

== Members, 20th Congress ==
As of June 30, 2025, all committee membership positions are vacant until the House convenes for its first regular session on July 28.

== Historical membership rosters ==
=== 18th Congress ===
| Position | Members | Party | Province/City | District |
|---|---|---|---|---|
| Chairperson | Alfred Vargas | PDP–Laban | Quezon City | 5th |
| Vice Chairpersons | Paz Radaza | Lakas | Lapu-Lapu City | Lone |
| Vice Chairpersons | Emmarie Ouano-Dizon | PDP–Laban | Cebu | 6th |
| Vice Chairpersons | Sabiniano Canama | COOP-NATCCO | Party-list | |
| Members for the Majority | Gerardo Valmayor Jr. | NPC | Negros Occidental | 1st |
| Members for the Majority | Elias Bulut Jr. | NPC | Apayao | Lone |
| Members for the Majority | Manuel Luis Lopez | NPC | Manila | 1st |
| Members for the Majority | Carmelo Lazatin II | PDP–Laban | Pampanga | 1st |
| Members for the Majority | Josefina Tallado | PDP–Laban | Camarines Norte | 1st |
| Members for the Majority | Janice Salimbangon | NUP | Cebu | 4th |
| Members for the Majority | Juliet Marie Ferrer | NUP | Negros Occidental | 4th |
| Members for the Majority | Diego Ty | NUP | Misamis Occidental | 1st |
| Members for the Majority | Joy Myra Tambunting | NUP | Parañaque | 2nd |
| Members for the Majority | Vincent Franco Frasco | Lakas | Cebu | 5th |
| Members for the Majority | Eugenio Angelo Barba | Nacionalista | Ilocos Norte | 2nd |
| Members for the Majority | Michael Gorriceta | Nacionalista | Iloilo | 2nd |
| Members for the Majority | Yedda Marie Romualdez | Tingog Sinirangan | Party-list | |
| Members for the Majority | Jocelyn Tulfo | ACT-CIS | Party-list | |
| Members for the Majority | Francis Gerald Abaya | Liberal | Cavite | 1st |
| Members for the Majority | Rommel Rico Angara | LDP | Aurora | Lone |
| Members for the Majority | Ma. Angelica Amante-Matba | PDP–Laban | Agusan del Norte | 2nd |
| Members for the Majority | Hector Sanchez | Lakas | Catanduanes | Lone |
| Members for the Majority | Macnell Lusotan | MARINO | Party-list | |
| Members for the Majority | Shirlyn Bañas-Nograles | PDP–Laban | South Cotabato | 1st |
| Members for the Majority | Aloysia Lim | RAM | Party-list | |
| Members for the Minority | Alex Advincula | NUP | Cavite | 3rd |
| Members for the Minority | Ma. Victoria Umali | A TEACHER | Party-list | |
| Members for the Minority | Irene Gay Saulog | KALINGA | Party-list | |
| Members for the Minority | Francisca Castro | ACT TEACHERS | Party-list | |

==== Chairperson ====
- Sandra Eriguel (La Union–2nd, NUP) August 7, 2019 – December 7, 2020

==== Vice Chairperson ====
- Marissa Andaya (Note: Died on July 5, 2020.) (Camarines Sur–1st, NPC)

== See also ==
- House of Representatives of the Philippines
- List of Philippine House of Representatives committees
- Department of Social Welfare and Development
