= Philippine House Committee on Ethics and Privileges =

Standing committee of the House of Representatives of the Philippines

Committee on Ethics and Privileges
- 20th Congress

History
- New session started: July 28, 2025

Leadership
- Chair: Jonathan Clement Abalos, 4Ps since July 30, 2025

Website
- Committee on Ethics and Privileges

The Philippine House Committee on Ethics and Privileges, or House Ethics and Privileges Committee is a standing committee of the Philippine House of Representatives.

== Jurisdiction ==
As prescribed by House Rules, the committee's jurisdiction is on the duties, conduct, rights, privileges and immunities, dignity, integrity and reputation of the House of Representatives of the Philippines and its members.

== Members, 20th Congress ==
Position	Member	Constituency	Party
Chairperson	Jonathan Clement Abalos	Party-list	4Ps
Vice Chairpersons	Vacant		
Members for the Majority	Vacant		
Members for the Minority	Vacant		

== Historical membership rosters ==
=== 18th Congress ===
Position	Members	Party	Province/City	District
Chairperson	Rosanna Vergara	PDP–Laban	Nueva Ecija	3rd
Vice Chairpersons	Cyrille Abueg-Zaldivar	PPP	Palawan	2nd
Vice Chairpersons	Florida Robes	NUP	San Jose del Monte	Lone
Member for the Majority	Luisa Lloren Cuaresma	NUP	Nueva Vizcaya	Lone
Members for the Minority	Gabriel Bordado Jr.	Liberal	Camarines Sur	3rd
Members for the Minority	Lawrence Lemuel Fortun	Nacionalista	Agusan del Norte	1st

== See also ==
- House of Representatives of the Philippines
- List of Philippine House of Representatives committees
