= Philippine House Committee on Government Enterprises and Privatization =

Standing committee of the House of Representatives of the Philippines

Committee on Government Enterprises and Privatization
- 20th Congress

History
- New session started: To convene on July 28, 2025

Leadership
- Chairman: Vacant
- Minority Leader: Vacant

Website
- Committee on Government Enterprises and Privatization

The Philippine House Committee on Government Enterprises and Privatization, or House Government Enterprises and Privatization Committee is a standing committee of the Philippine House of Representatives.

== Jurisdiction ==
As prescribed by House Rules, the committee's jurisdiction is on the creation, organization, operation, reorganization and amendments of the charters of government-owned or controlled corporations which includes the following:

- Government Service Insurance System
- Social Security System
- Similar institutions

However, this does not include government-owned or controlled banks and financial institutions.

== Members, 20th Congress ==
As of June 30, 2025, all committee membership positions are vacant until the House convenes for its first regular session on July 28.

== Historical membership rosters ==
=== 18th Congress ===
Position	Members	Party	Province/City	District
Chairperson	Eric Olivarez	PDP–Laban	Parañaque	1st
Vice Chairpersons	Jesus Manuel Suntay	PDP–Laban	Quezon City	4th
Vice Chairpersons	Eric Yap	ACT-CIS	Party-list	
Vice Chairpersons	Vincent Franco Frasco	Lakas	Cebu	5th
Members for the Majority	Ramon Nolasco Jr.	NUP	Cagayan	1st
Members for the Majority	Joselito Sacdalan	PDP–Laban	Cotabato	1st
Members for the Majority	Rolando Uy	NUP	Cagayan de Oro	1st
Members for the Majority	Joel Mayo Almario	PDP–Laban	Davao Oriental	2nd
Members for the Majority	Francis Gerald Abaya	Liberal	Cavite	1st
Members for the Majority	Weslie Gatchalian	NPC	Valenzuela	1st
Members for the Majority	Michael John Duavit	NPC	Rizal	1st
Members for the Majority	Manuel Luis Lopez	NPC	Manila	1st
Members for the Minority	Arlene Brosas	GABRIELA	Party-list	
Members for the Minority	Ferdinand Gaite	Bayan Muna	Party-list	

==== Members for the Majority ====
- Marissa Andaya (Note: Died on July 5, 2020.) (Camarines Sur–1st, NPC)

== See also ==
- House of Representatives of the Philippines
- List of Philippine House of Representatives committees
