= Felimon Espares =

Filipino politician (born 1965)

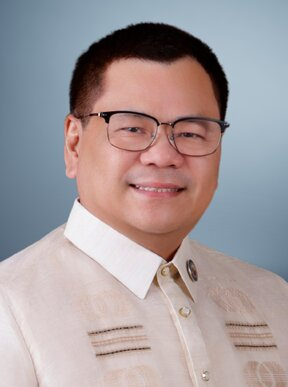
- Official portrait, 2025

Member of the Philippine House of Representatives for the Coop-NATCCO party-list
- Incumbent
- Assumed office June 30, 2022
- Preceded by: Sabiniamo Canama
House committee chairmanships
Chair of the House Committee on Ethics and Privileges
Incumbent
Assumed office June 30, 2022
Preceded by	Rosanna Vergara

Personal details
- Born: Felimon Mondia Espares; August 3, 1965 (age 61) Barbaza, Antique, Philippines
- Party: Coop-NATCCO (2022-present)
- Education: University of Antique (Education)

Felimon Mondia Espares (born August 3, 1965) is a respresentative in the House of Representatives of the Philippines for the Coop-NATCCO partylist.

== Early life ==
Felimon Mondia Espares was born on August 3, 1965, in Barbaza, Antique. In 1988, he graduated from the University of Antique. He gained a degree in Education, majoring in Mathematics. In 1992, he became a teacher in a high school. In 2000, he gained the Youngest Coop Manager award from the Visayas Cooperative Development Center. In 2007, he was recognized as an outstanding alumnus by the University. In 2012, he was declared as the Regional Outstanding Coop Leader by the Cooperative Development Authority.

== Political career ==
Espares was the first nominee of the Coop-NATCCO partylist. In the 2022 Philippine House of Representatives elections, Coop-NATCCO gained 30th place with 346,341 votes, 0.94 percent of the votes. Since Espares was the first nominee, he gained a seat in the 19th Congress of the Philippines. In his term, he principally authored 108 bills and co-authored 76 bills. He is the chairperson of the Philippine House Committee on Ethics and Privileges. On September 4, 2024, he told the Department of Energy to make sure that upcoming power plants are accessible to the transmission grid. Espares is the first nominee of the Coop-NATCCO partylist in the 2025 Philippine House of Representatives party-list election.
