= FPJ Panday Bayanihan =

Philippine foundation

- — Philippine partylist —
- Secretary general: Jyleazar Dela Rosa
- Type: Sectoral organization
- Sector(s) represented: Multi-sector
- Founded: 2013; 13 years ago
- COMELEC accreditation: 2024; 2 years ago

Current representation (20th Congress)
- Seats in the House of Representatives: 1 / 3 (Out of 63 Partylist seats)
- Representative(s): Brian Poe Llamanzares

Website
- fpjpandaybayanihan.org

FPJ Panday Bayanihan is a party-list organization and foundation in the Philippines that has secured representation in the House of Representatives of the Philippines. Originally established as a humanitarian foundation in 2013, the organization has grown into a multi-sector political party engaged in disaster relief, education, public health, sports development, and legislative advocacy. Its name references the classic Fernando Poe Jr.-starring film Ang Panday (1980) and the Filipino concept of bayanihan, meaning communal unity and cooperation.

== Background and founding ==
FPJ Panday Bayanihan was organized in 2013 by Grace Poe, daughter of the late actor and presidential candidate Fernando Poe Jr. (FPJ), in direct response to the devastation caused by Tropical Storm Trami (locally known as Maring). The foundation was conceived as a means of honoring FPJ's legacy of service to ordinary Filipinos, particularly those in vulnerable and marginalized communities.

Co-founded by Grace Poe's son, Brian Poe Llamanzares, the foundation steadily expanded its reach from emergency relief to longer-term socio-civic programs. Llamanzares has stated publicly that FPJ, who did not complete college following the death of his own father at a young age, was motivated throughout his life by a desire to help people, and that the foundation was created to continue that mission.

== Socio-civic and humanitarian work ==
Since its founding, FPJ Panday Bayanihan has implemented a wide range of humanitarian and community development programs across the Philippines. To date, the organization has assisted more than 22,000 families and distributed approximately 45,000 relief packs.

=== Disaster relief operations ===
FPJ Panday Bayanihan has mounted systematic relief efforts in the wake of some of the Philippines' most destructive natural disasters. These include operations following Typhoon Yolanda (Haiyan), the Marawi siege in 2017, and the eruption of Taal Volcano in January 2020.

In 2020, the organization distributed relief goods to families affected by Super Typhoon Carina, reaching 2,000 households in Metro Manila and Bulacan. That same year, relief operations were also conducted in Cagayan Valley following a separate typhoon disaster. The foundation further extended aid to victims of a fire in San Carlos City, Pangasinan in 2024, and provided relief goods to communities affected by Cebu earthquakes.

In 2025, the party-list distributed food packs and relief items across Pangasinan, including assistance to over 650 persons with disabilities (PWDs) in San Carlos, 350 senior citizens in Calasiao, and 450 fisherfolk in the island barangay of Pugaro Suit in Dagupan City. The organization also aided over 14,426 families in Basista, Pangasinan.

=== COVID-19 pandemic response ===
During the COVID-19 pandemic, FPJ Panday Bayanihan distributed more than 35,000 units of personal protective equipment (PPE) to medical frontliners across the country. Senator Grace Poe and the foundation also donated thousands of PPE sets as well as rice sacks to frontline healthcare workers and vulnerable sectors in 2020.

=== Education and youth programs ===
The foundation established the FPJ Panday Bayanihan Iskolar ng Bayan scholarship program, which provides financial assistance to college students from across the Philippines. In partnership with the Department of Social Welfare and Development (DSWD), scholars receive a ₱5,000 grant. The program was created in tribute to FPJ himself, who was unable to complete his college education after his father passed away when he was in his early teens.

The foundation has also partnered with UP Cebu to empower student athletes, and organized a Youth Congress to unite young leaders from various sectors. In 2023, the foundation partnered with SustainablePH to launch the Learn2Lead Sustainability Program, aimed at cultivating the next generation of environmentally conscious leaders.

=== Sports and community development ===
FPJ Panday Bayanihan has been an active backer of grassroots sports in the Philippines. In 2023, the foundation provided support for the 19th season of Ang Liga, a community basketball program. The organization also co-organized the FPJ Shoot for a Cause, a charity basketball event that raised funds to support the children of fallen soldiers in the Armed Forces of the Philippines (AFP).

=== Livelihood and fisheries support ===
In line with party-list representative Brian Poe Llamanzares' vice chairmanship of the House Committee on Food and Agriculture, FPJ Panday Bayanihan has undertaken programs targeting the Philippine fishing sector. In 2025, the organization announced plans to advance livelihood programs for fisherfolk communities.

== Political history ==
FPJ Panday Bayanihan received accreditation from the Commission on Elections (COMELEC) as a party-list group in 2024. Prior to this, the organization operated solely as a non-government foundation. The group subsequently amassed over 500,000 signatures from national supporters to strengthen its accreditation bid.

=== 2025 elections ===
FPJ Panday Bayanihan participated in the 2025 Philippine midterm elections as a registered party-list group. Its first nominee was Brian Poe Llamanzares, son of Senator Grace Poe and co-founder of the foundation. Grace Poe's husband was also among the group's nominees. The second nominee was Batangas contractor Mark Patron. During the campaign, Brian Poe Llamanzares received campaign donations from government contractors Maynard Ngu and Joseph Quirante. Ngu was the alleged bagman of Senator Francis Escudero in the 2025-2026 flood control projects scandal in the Philippines. The Philippine Omnibus Election Code bans candidates from receiving campaign donations from contractors.

The group won one seat in the House of Representatives, with Llamanzares proclaimed as party-list representative for the 20th Congress (2025–2028). The group garnered 538,003 votes, representing 1.28 percent of the total party-list vote.

Following the election, COMELEC announced plans to ban party-list groups using names shared with government aid programs and television series. In response, FPJ Panday Bayanihan clarified that "FPJ" in their name officially stands for "food, progress, and justice," while acknowledging that the initials are also widely recognized as those of Fernando Poe Jr.

== Legislative work (20th Congress) ==
As party-list representative for FPJ Panday Bayanihan in the 20th Congress, Brian Poe Llamanzares serves as vice chairman of the House Committees on Food and Agriculture, Economic Development, and Justice, among other committees. His legislative agenda reflects the foundation's longstanding civic programs, with particular focus on food security, employment, and access to justice.

=== School feeding program and food waste reduction ===
Rep. Llamanzares has been a leading advocate in the House for the expansion of the Department of Education's school-based feeding program. Working alongside the World Food Programme (WFP) and DepEd, he has pushed for broader coverage of the program to address child malnutrition in public schools. He has characterized funding for the feeding program as "non-negotiable," and successfully advocated for an augmentation of ₱18 billion for the initiative.

Llamanzares also championed food waste reduction legislation, speaking at the 1st Philippine Food Banking Summit in 2025 in support of a Food Waste Reduction Bill. He continued this advocacy into 2026, participating in events tied to the International Day of Zero Waste.

=== Employment and workforce upskilling ===
In the context of growing concerns about job displacement caused by artificial intelligence and declining employment in the business process outsourcing (BPO) sector, Rep. Llamanzares filed legislation and pushed for policies aimed at job creation and workforce upskilling. In February 2026, he called on Congress to take proactive steps to mitigate AI-driven unemployment, particularly for BPO workers whose roles are vulnerable to automation.

Llamanzares has also advocated for the expanded use of the Technical Education and Skills Development Authority (TESDA) as a vehicle for achieving zero unemployment by equipping workers with in-demand skills.

=== Justice and legal aid advocacy ===
Through his role in the House Committee on Justice, Rep. Llamanzares has championed greater funding and institutional support for the Philippine justice system. He has been a notable advocate for the Department of Justice's Katarungan Caravan, a mobile legal aid program that delivers free legal services to underserved communities. Llamanzares called for expanded budget allocations for the program, which has been lauded for bringing the justice system closer to marginalized Filipinos.

He has also supported increased funding for the Office of the Ombudsman, particularly for its Personnel Assistance Centers, which provide support to persons deprived of liberty (PDLs) and others navigating the justice system.

== Recognition and awards ==
In August 2024, Brian Poe Llamanzares was recognized as one of "Asia's Modern Heroes" at the Asia Modern Hero Awards held at Okada Manila. He received the "Asia's Humanitarian Distinction Honoring Heroic Contributions" award for his leadership of FPJ Panday Bayanihan. He was honored alongside National Security Adviser Eduardo Año, Tingog Party-list Representative Yedda Romualdez, and Philippine Army Chief Lt. General Roy M. Galido.

== Name ==
The organization takes its name from two distinct references. Panday (meaning "blacksmith" or "craftsman") refers to the FPJ film Ang Panday (1980), one of Fernando Poe Jr.'s most iconic roles. Bayanihan is a Filipino term denoting communal solidarity, traditionally symbolized by neighbors helping one another carry a house to a new location.

Following COMELEC's proposed restrictions on party-list names shared with government programs and television series, FPJ Panday Bayanihan announced that "FPJ" in its official party-list name stands for "food, progress, and justice", the three pillars of its legislative agenda, while noting that the initials have long been associated with Fernando Poe Jr. in popular memory.

== Election results ==
Election results for FPJ Panday Bayanihan
Election	Votes	%	Secured Seats	Party-List Seats	Congress	Representative
2025	538,003	1.28%	1 / 3	63	20th Congress 2025–2028	Brian Poe Llamanzares
