= Tutok to Win Party-List =

Political slate in the Philippines

Tutok To Win
- — Philippine partylist —
- Sector(s) represented: Urban poor
- Colors: Orange, Blue

Current representation (20th Congress)
- Seats in the House of Representatives: 0 / 3 (Out of 63 party-list seats)

The Tutok To Win Party-List is a political organization seeking party-list representation in the House of Representatives of the Philippines.

== Background ==
The Tutok To Win Party-List took part in the 2022 election aiming to secure at least a seat in the House of Representatives. Its platform tackles affordable housing, education, livelihood and health and aims to advance the interest of the indigent population, especially for those residing in the urban areas, the elderly and the youth.

Tutok To Win's first nominee to the House of Representatives was Sam Verzosa, a co-founder of the multi-level marketing firm Frontrow. The organization's campaign was endorsed by gameshow host Willie Revillame. Revillame and Versoza are close friends with the latter's Frontrow also sponsoring the former's Tutok to Win program.

Tutok to Win was an online game show conceptualized and hosted by Revillame in March 2020 amidst the imposition of community quarantines in the Philippines during the early part of the COVID-19 pandemic. The show gave an opportunity to a random viewer to interact and receive prizes from Revillame as well as featured the host's other charity projects. The program later become a segment of Revillame's television game show Wowowin at GMA Network. Revillame convinced Verzosa to enter politics so that they could serve a larger population than with the Tutok to Win program. Hence the Tutok To Win Party-List was established and the namesake program was renamed as Tutok Para Manalo. Tutok Para Manalo concluded in February 2022.

Sam Verzosa ran for mayor of Manila in the 2025 local elections. For the 2025 House of Representatives election, Tutok to Win will have a new set of nominees, with seven of ten being Verzosa's relatives. They lost representation after their vote share dropped to 40,958 votes, or 0.10% of the vote, the worst performing result amongst incumbent party-lists seeking reelection.

== Electoral history and Representation in Congress ==
Election	Votes	%	Secured Seats	Party-List Seats	Congress	1st Representative	2nd Representative	3rd Representative
2022	685,578	1.86%	1 / 3	63	19th Congress; 2022–2025	Sam Verzosa	—	—
2025	41,036	0.10%	0 / 3	63	20th Congress; 2025–2028	Failed to secure representation		
Note: A party-list representation in the House of Representatives of the Philippines, can win a maximum of three seats in the House of Representatives.
