= Jonathan Clement Abalos =

Filipino representative (born 1994)

JC Abalos
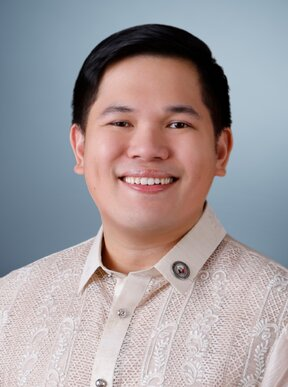
- Official portrait, 2025

Member of the Philippine House of Representatives for the 4Ps Party-list
- Incumbent
- Assumed office June 30, 2022 Serving with Marcelino Libanan

Assistant Minority Leader of the House of Representatives of the Philippines
- Incumbent
- Assumed office July 26, 2022

Chairperson of the House Committee on Ethics and Privileges
- Incumbent
- Assumed office July 30, 2025

Personal details
- Born: Jonathan Clement Miranda Abalos II; March 18, 1994 (age 32) Manila, Philippines
- Party: Independent; 4Ps Party-list
- Relations: Benjamin Abalos (grandfather); Benjamin Abalos, Jr. (uncle)
- Education: Ateneo de Manila University (AB)

Jonathan Clement "JC" Miranda Abalos II (born March 18, 1994) is a Filipino politician who is the party-list representative for 4Ps Party-list or Pagtibayin at Palaguin ang Pangkabuhayang Pilipino (lit.'Strengthen and Grow the Filipino Livelihood'), alongside Marcelino Libanan. He is the assistant minority leader (2022–2025) of the House of Representatives of the Philippines.

== Biography ==
JC Abalos is the only son of former Mandaluyong City councilor, Jonathan 'Jon' Abalos and Judy. His paternal grandfather is Benjamin Abalos and his uncle is Benjamin Abalos, Jr.

He finished his elementary education at La Salle Green Hills in 2008. He graduated high school at the Ateneo de Manila University in 2012. He received his Bachelor of Arts degree major in Interdisciplinary Studies with specializations in Communications and Philosophy from the Ateneo de Manila University in 2016.

== Career ==
JC Abalos is a first-term (from 2022) party-list representative from the 4Ps Party-list. He is a member of the minority bloc and is tasked to be part of twenty-two (22) house committees.

== Political positions ==
He prioritizes legislative measures that aim to alleviate poverty in the Philippines (especially through the conditional cash transfer program), bills that seek to improve electoral practice and institutions (such as the plan to declare election day as holiday) and interventions that intend to improve the health services of the Philippine government (such as bills the seek to establish a National Cancer Center, Virology Institute, among others).

== Controversy ==
JC Abalos is formerly the fifth nominee of 4Ps Party-list. His election as the second nominee (and eventually second representative, together with fellow 4Ps Party-list representative and House Minority Leader Marcelino Libanan) of 4Ps Party-list came as the result of the withdrawal of his father, Jon Abalos (second nominee) in November 2021.

In early 2024, he criticized the low budget for a cash transfer program, made by the Department of Social Welfare and Development (DSWD).

== Personal life ==
JC Abalos has had cancer.
