= Philippine House Committee on Climate Change =

Standing committee of the House of Representatives of the Philippines

Committee on Climate Change
- 20th Congress

History
- New session started: July 28, 2025

Leadership
- Chair: Aniela Tolentino, NUP since July 30, 2025
- Minority Leader: Vacant since June 30, 2025

Website
- Committee on Climate Change

The Philippine House Committee on Climate Change is a standing committee of the Philippine House of Representatives.

== Jurisdiction ==
As prescribed by House Rules, the committee's jurisdiction is on policies and programs to mitigate the impact of climate change to the environment which is characterized by the following:

- Global warming
- Greenhouse effect
- Rising of sea levels
- Shifts in meteorological patterns

== Members, 20th Congress ==
Position	Member	Constituency	Party
Chairperson	Aniela Tolentino	Cavite–8th	NUP
Vice Chairpersons	Vacant		
Members for the Majority	Vacant		
Members for the Minority	Vacant		

== Historical membership rosters ==
=== 18th Congress ===
Position	Members	Party	Province/City	District
Chairperson	Edgar Chatto	Liberal	Bohol	1st
Vice Chairpersons	Romeo Momo Sr.	CWS	Party-list	
Vice Chairpersons	Francis Gerald Abaya	Liberal	Cavite	1st
Vice Chairpersons	Elisa Kho	PDP–Laban	Masbate	2nd
Members for the Majority	Alan Dujali	PDP–Laban	Davao del Norte	2nd
Members for the Majority	Geraldine Roman	PDP–Laban	Bataan	1st
Members for the Majority	Ramon Nolasco Jr.	NUP	Cagayan	1st
Members for the Majority	Allen Jesse Mangaoang	Nacionalista	Kalinga	Lone
Members for the Majority	Leo Rafael Cueva	NUP	Negros Occidental	2nd
Members for the Majority	Yasser Balindong	Lakas	Lanao del Sur	2nd
Members for the Majority	Julienne Baronda	NUP	Iloilo City	Lone
Members for the Majority	Ed Christopher Go	Nacionalista	Isabela	2nd
Members for the Minority	Irene Gay Saulog	KALINGA	Party-list	
Members for the Minority	Eufemia Cullamat	Bayan Muna	Party-list	

== See also ==
- House of Representatives of the Philippines
- List of Philippine House of Representatives committees
