= 4Ps Partylist =

Political party in the Philippines

4Ps
- — Philippine partylist —
- Full name: Pagtibayin at Palaguin ang Pangkabuhayang Pilipino
- President: Marcelino Libanan
- Founded: April 17, 2019; 7 years ago
- Headquarters: Quezon City, Philippines

Current representation (20th Congress)
- Seats in the House of Representatives: 2 / 3 (Out of 63 party-list seats)
- Representative(s): Marcelino Libanan; Jonathan Clement Abalos

The Pagtibayin at Palaguin ang Pangkabuhayang Pilipino (lit. 'Strengthen and Grow the Filipino Livelihood'), also known as the 4Ps or 4Ps Partylist, is a party-list organization in the Philippines that seeks representation in the House of Representatives of the Philippines. Founded on April 17, 2019, the party advocates for poverty alleviation, social welfare, and the empowerment of marginalized sectors, particularly beneficiaries of the Pantawid Pamilyang Pilipino Program (4Ps). It is currently led by Marcelino Libanan as its president.

== History ==
The 4Ps Party-list was established in 2019 to represent the interests of beneficiaries of the Pantawid Pamilyang Pilipino Program (4Ps), a government conditional cash transfer program aimed at reducing poverty. The party seeks to ensure that the voices of low-income families and marginalized sectors are heard in the Philippine Congress.

== Background ==
4Ps Party-list took part in the 2022 Philippine elections, where it secured at least one seat in the House of Representatives.

The Partylist Watch and the Department of Social Welfare and Development (DSWD) sought to nullify the 4Ps Party-list's Securities and Exchange Commission (SEC) registration, alleging that the party-list named itself after the DSWD's Pantawid Pamilyang Pilipino Program (4Ps) conditional cash transfer program. However, the organization's key platform includes amending the 4Ps Law (Republic Act No. 11310) to enhance the program for beneficiaries.

For the 2022 Philippine House of Representatives elections, the 4Ps Party-list nominated Marcelino Libanan, Edwin Cigres, Gene Darryl Santok, April Andrew Alamer, and Jonathan Clement "JC" Abalos II. The party received 848,237 votes, or 2.30% of the total votes, securing two (2) seats in the House of Representatives of the Philippines. Its representatives are Marcelino Libanan and Jonathan Clement "JC" Abalos.

Marcelino Libanan was elected the House Minority Leader. He is joined by his colleague JC Abalos as Assistant Minority Leader.

Watchdog groups, including Partylist Watch, criticized 4Ps as a "fake" party-list, stating that the organization "no experience in championing the interests of the poor" and "has links to personalities implicated in corruption in the past". Election watchdog Kontra Daya tagged 4Ps on its list of party-list groups that do not serve marginalized groups and have links to political dynasties, big business, or the police or the military, or have corruption cases, since 4Ps is represented by Abalos who is a member of a political dynasty. Kontra Daya and Partylist Watch also flagged Marcelino Libanan, who was accused of graft and corruption relating to the purchase of P3.25 million worth of fertilizer in 2004 as part of the fertilizer fund scam.

== Name ==
The 4Ps Partylist is known as the Pagtibayin at Palaguin ang Pangkabuhayang Pilipino. Its abbreviation shares similarities with the Pantawid Pamilyang Pilipino Program (4Ps) conditional cash transfer program of the government.

Senator Leila de Lima alleged that the 4Ps Partylist deliberately named itself and used a similar logo promote associations of the group with the conditional cash transfer program. It suggest de Lima might be confusing their group to the Progresibong Patutulungan sa Pag-unlad ng Pilipinas which was disqualified by the COMELEC. Partylist Watch has a similar claim that the 4Ps Partylist is "credit grabbing" with its name choice.

The 4Ps Party-list denied these claims and has maintained that does not claim association with the DSWD's 4Ps program and that no entity has exclusive legal rights to the 4Ps acronym. It also justifies itself, stating that the acronym 4Ps is also used in marketing and research.

Responding to reports that the Commission on Election is planning to ban groups running under a name which shares government aid programs and television series after the conclusion of the 2025 election, the 4Ps Partylist repeated its reasoning that 4Ps was a marketing term both adopted by the DSWD and itself.

== Electoral results ==
Election	Votes	%	Secured Seats	Party-List Seats	Congress	1st Representatives	2nd Representatives	Ref.
2022	848,237	2.30%	2 / 3	63	19th Congress; 2022–2025	Marcelino Libanan	Jonathan Clement Abalos	
2025	1,469,571	3.50%	2 / 3	63	20th Congress; 2025–2028	Marcelino Libanan	Jonathan Clement Abalos	
Note: A party-list group, can win a maximum of three seats in the House of Representatives.
