= Coop-NATCCO =

Party-list in the Philippines

- — Philippine partylist —
- Full name: Cooperative NATCCO Party
- Sector(s) represented: Cooperatives
- Founded: 1997; 28 years ago
- COMELEC accreditation: 1997; 28 years ago
- Colors: Red, Yellow, Blue

Current representation (20th Congress)
- Seats in the House of Representatives: 1 / 3 (Out of 63 party-list seats)
- Representative(s): Felimon Espares

The Cooperative NATCCO Party (Coop-NATCCO) is a party-list in the Philippines which serves as the electoral wing of the National Confederation of Cooperatives (NATCCO). Coop-NATCCO has represented the Philippine co-operative sector in the Philippine 11th Congress since 1998 when the party won a seat in the House of Representatives in the first ever national party-list election held in the country that year. Coop-NATCCO has continued to win a seat in Congress in the succeeding party-list elections.

Coop-NATCCO representatives have included Cong. Jose R. Ping-ay in the 14th and 15th Congress. During his term as chairperson in 2008, NATCCO reached the landmark first billion in assets. NATCCO became a secondary federation in 2004.Cong. Cresente C. Paez in the 11th Congress and Cong. Guillermo P. Cua in the 13th Congress and the 14th Congress. Despite its winning votes, Coop-NATCCO had no representative in the 12th Congress because of a disqualification case brought against the party by another party-list. The disqualification issue dragged for almost the whole length of the 12th Congress. In December 2003, the Commission on Election (COMELEC) upheld Coop-NATCCO as a qualified party-list but by that time, it was too late for Coop-NATCCO to have a Congress Representative proclaimed for the party.

== Creation ==
Coop-NATCCO Party-List was created by NATCCO leaders who viewed the party-list system as an opportunity to go beyond mere dependence on traditional politicians to push forward the co-operative's legislative agenda.

On July 27, 1997, the NATCCO board met at Cauayan, Isabela, and approved the network's participation in the party-list election. On November 12, 1997, the board met again and commissioned Atty. Edmund Lao to prepare the party's manifestation to participate in the election and to draft the by-laws of Coop-NATCCO Network Party-List.

Coop-NATCCO Party-List was registered with the COMELEC on November 11, 1997. On February 7, 1998, a COMELEC promulgation disqualified the party. Atty. Edmund Lao filed a motion for reconsideration. Meanwhile, the party still proceeded to come up with its list of 5 nominees.

== Electoral performance ==
Election	Votes	%	Seats	Representative #1	Representative #2	Representative #3
1998	189,802	2.07%	1	Cresente Paez	—	—
2001	Disqualified					
2004	270,950	2.13%	1	Guillermo Cua	—	—
2007	409,987	2.12%	2	Jose Ping-ay	Cresente Paez	—
2010	944,864	3.14%	2	Jose Ping-ay	Cresente Paez	—
2013	642,005	2.32%	2	Cresente Paez	Antonio Bravo	—
2016	671,699	2.07%	2	Antonio Bravo	Sabiniano Canama	—
2019	417,285	1.50%	1	Sabiniano Canama	—	—
2022	346,341	0.94%	1	Felimon Espares	—	—
2025	509,913	1.22%	1	Felimon Espares	—	—
