= House of Representatives of the Philippines =

Lower house of the Congress of the Philippines

House of Representatives Kapulungan ng mga Kinatawan
- 20th Congress of the Philippines
- Seal of the House of Representatives of the Philippines

- Flag of the House of Representatives

Type
- Type: Lower house of the Congress of the Philippines
- Term limits: 3 consecutive terms (9 years), renewable after a term out of office

History
- Founded: 1987; 39 years ago (current form); October 16, 1907; 119 years ago (as the Philippine Assembly)

Leadership
- Speaker: Bojie Dy (PFP) since September 17, 2025
- Senior Deputy Speaker: Ferdinand Hernandez (PFP) since November 19, 2025
- Deputy Speakers: List: Janette Garin (Lakas); Yasser Balindong (Lakas); Paolo Ortega (Lakas); Jay Khonghun (Lakas); Ronaldo Puno (NUP); Ferjenel Biron (Nacionalista); Raymond Mendoza (TUCP), since July 28, 2025; Yevgeny Emano (Nacionalista), since August 11, 2025; David Suarez (Lakas), since November 19, 2025; Maria Rachel Arenas (Lakas); Duke Frasco (Independent); Albee Benitez (PFP), since March 18, 2026; Mercedes Alvarez–Lansang (NPC), since August 3, 2026
- Majority Leader: Sandro Marcos (Lakas) since July 28, 2025
- Minority Leader: Marcelino Libanan (4Ps) since July 25, 2022

Structure
- Seats: 318 representatives: 254 congressional district representatives; 64 party-list representatives
- Political groups: Majority (285): Lakas (73); NUP (54); PFP (51); Party-lists (43); NPC (35); Nacionalista (17); Liberal (3); MKTZNU (2); 1CEBU (1); CDP (1); LDP (1); Navoteño (1); PDP (1); Independent (1); Minority (27): Party-lists (20); Liberal (3); NUP (2); Lakas (1); Nacionalista (1); Independent (5): HTL (3); Lakas (1); Party-list (1); Vacant (1): Vacant (1)
- Committees: 66 standing committees, 14 special committees and 4 ad hoc committees
- Length of term: 3 years
- Authority: Article VI, Constitution of the Philippines

Elections
- Voting system: Parallel voting: First-past-the-post voting in 80% of seats; Party-list proportional representation in 20% of seats
- First election: May 11, 1987 (current form) July 30, 1907 (as the Philippine Assembly)
- Last election: May 12, 2025
- Next election: May 8, 2028
- Redistricting: Districts are reapportioned by law following each national census (this has not occurred since 1987); By statute (most frequent method)

Meeting place
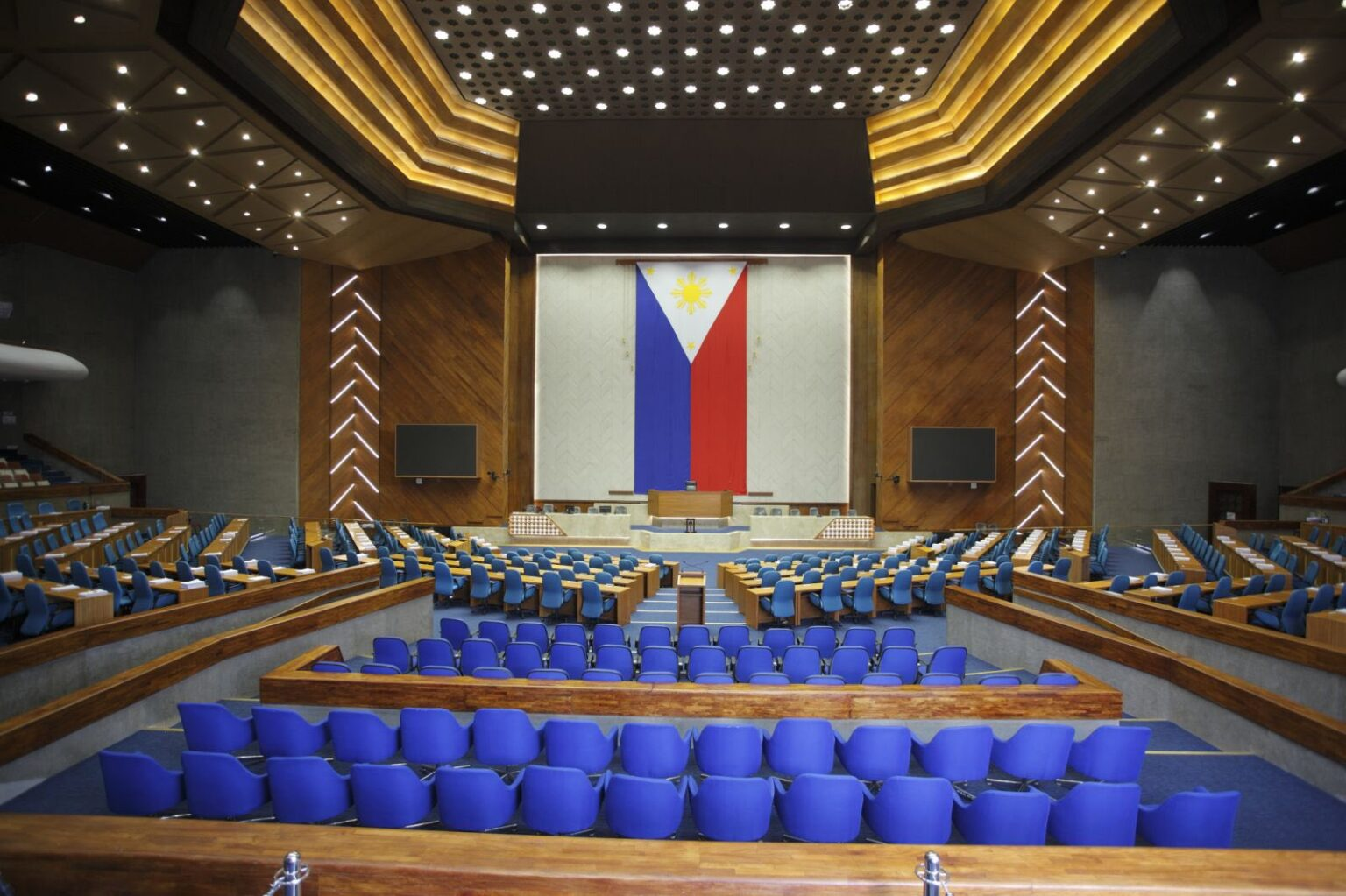
- Batasang Pambansa Complex, Batasan Hills, Quezon City

Website
- congress.gov.ph

Rules
- Rules of the House of Representatives (English)

The House of Representatives (Filipino: Kapulungan ng mga Kinatawan or Kamara) (Note: The Filipino term kamara comes from the Spanish word cámara, meaning "chamber", as in Cámara de Representantes.) is the lower house of Congress, the bicameral legislature of the Philippines, with the Senate as the upper house. The lower house is commonly referred to as Congress, (Note: The URL of the website of the House of Representatives is, for example, www.congress.gov.ph.) although the term collectively refers to both houses.

Members of the House are officially styled as representatives (mga kinatawan) and are sometimes informally called congressmen or congresswomen (mga kongresista). They are elected to a three-year term and can be re-elected, but cannot serve more than three consecutive terms without an interruption of one term (e.g. serving one term in the Senate ad interim). Around 80% of congressmen are district representatives, representing specific geographical areas. The 20th Congress has 254 congressional district representatives. Party-list representatives (currently 64), who make up not more than twenty percent of the total number of representatives, are elected through the party-list system.

Aside from needing its agreement to every bill before it is sent to the president for signature to become law, the House of Representatives has the power to impeach certain officials and all franchise and money bills must originate from the lower house.

The House of Representatives is headed by the House speaker (ispiker). The position is currently held by Bojie Dy. The speaker of the House is third in the Philippine presidential line of succession, after the vice president and the Senate president. The official headquarters of the House of Representatives is at the Batasang Pambansa (literally "national legislature") located in Batasan Hills, Quezon City. The building is often simply called Batasan, and the word has also become a metonym to refer to the House of Representatives.

== History ==
=== Malolos Congress ===
The Philippine legislative system began in a unicameral form of government in 1898 when then President Emilio Aguinaldo established the Malolos Congress of the short-lived First Philippine Republic from 1898 to 1901. The Congress’ notable achievement was the ratification of Philippine Independence when it was declared on June 12, 1898, in Kawit, Cavite.

The Malolos Congress’ convened at the Barasoain Church during the subsequent inauguration of Emilio Aguinaldo and the Malolos Constitution in 1898. A year prior to the establishment of the republic, the Congress approved the motion to declare war on the United States, thus beginning the Philippine–American War which lasted from 1899 to 1901. The Malolos Congress was dissolved on April 1, 1901, following Aguinaldo's declaration of allegiance to the United States when he was captured.

=== Philippine Assembly ===
At the beginning of American colonial rule, from March 16, 1900, the sole national legislative body was the Philippine Commission with all members appointed by the president of the United States. Headed by the governor-general of the Philippines, the body exercised all legislative authority given to it by the president and the United States Congress until October 1907 when it was joined by the Philippine Assembly. William Howard Taft was chosen to be the first American civilian governor-general and the first leader of this Philippine Commission, which subsequently became known as the Taft Commission.

The Philippine Bill of 1902, a basic law, or organic act, of the Insular Government, mandated that once certain conditions were met a bicameral, or two-chamber, Philippine Legislature would be created with the previously existing, all-appointed Philippine Commission as the upper house and the Philippine Assembly as the lower house. This bicameral legislature was inaugurated in October 1907. Under the leadership of speaker Sergio Osmeña and floor Leader Manuel L. Quezon, the rules of the 59th United States Congress was substantially adopted as the rules of the Philippine Legislature. Osmeña and Quezon led the Nacionalista Party, with a platform of independence from the United States, into successive electoral victories against the Progresista Party and later the Democrata Party, which first advocated United States statehood, then opposed immediate independence.

It is this body, founded as the Philippine Assembly, that would continue in one form or another, and with a few different names, up until the present day.

=== Jones Act of 1916 ===
In 1916, the Jones Act, officially the Philippine Autonomy Act, changed the legislative system. The Philippine Commission was abolished and a new fully elected, bicameral Philippine Legislature consisting of a House of Representatives and a Senate was established. The Nacionalistas continued their electoral dominance at this point, although they were split into two factions led by Osmeña and Quezon; the two reconciled in 1924, and controlled the Assembly via a virtual dominant-party system.

=== Commonwealth and the Third Republic ===
The legislative system was changed again in 1935. The 1935 Constitution established a unicameral National Assembly. But in 1940, through an amendment to the 1935 Constitution, a bicameral Congress of the Philippines consisting of a House of Representatives and a Senate was adopted.

Upon the inauguration of the Republic of the Philippines in 1946, Republic Act No. 6 was enacted providing that on the date of the proclamation of the Republic of the Philippines, the existing Congress would be known as the First Congress of the Republic. The "Liberal bloc" of the Nacionalistas permanently split from their ranks, creating the Liberal Party. These two will contest all of the elections in what appeared to be a two-party system. The party of the ruling president wins the elections in the House of Representatives; in cases where the party of the president and the majority of the members of the House of Representatives are different, a sufficient number will break away and join the party of the president, thereby ensuring that the president will have control of the House of Representatives.

=== Martial law ===
This set up continued until President Ferdinand Marcos declared martial law and abolished Congress. He would rule by decree even after the 1973 Constitution abolished the bicameral Congress and created a unicameral Batasang Pambansa parliamentary system of government, as parliamentary election would not occur in 1978. Marcos' Kilusang Bagong Lipunan (KBL; New Society Movement) won all of the seats except those from the Central Visayas ushering in an era of KBL dominance, which continued until the People Power Revolution overthrew Marcos in 1986.

=== 1987 Constitution ===
The 1987 Constitution restored the presidential system of government together with a bicameral Congress of the Philippines. One deviation from the previous setup was the introduction of the mid-term election; however, the dynamics of the House of Representatives resumed its pre-1972 state, with the party of the president controlling the chamber, although political pluralism ensued that prevented the restoration of the old Nacionalista-Liberal two-party system. Instead, a multi-party system evolved.

Corazon Aquino who nominally had no party, supported the Laban ng Demokratikong Pilipino (LDP; Struggle of the Democratic Filipinos). With the victory of Fidel V. Ramos in the 1992 presidential election, many representatives defected to his Lakas–NUCD party; the same would happen with Joseph Estrada's victory in 1998, but he lost support when he was ousted after the 2001 EDSA Revolution that brought his vice president Gloria Macapagal Arroyo to power. This also meant the restoration of Lakas–NUCD as the top party in the chamber. The same would happen when Benigno Aquino III won in 2010, which returned the Liberals into power. Rodrigo Duterte's election as president in 2016 had most Liberals to switch to the ruling party PDP–Laban. After Bongbong Marcos won in the 2022 elections, Lakas–CMD once again became the dominant party in the House.

The presiding officer is the speaker. Unlike the Senate president, the speaker usually serves the entire term of Congress, although there had been instances when the speaker left office due to conflict with the president: examples include Jose de Venecia Jr.'s resignation as speaker in 2008 when his son Joey de Venecia exposed alleged corrupt practices by first gentleman Mike Arroyo, and Manny Villar's ouster which occurred after he allowed the impeachment of president Estrada in 2000.

== Electoral system ==
The Philippines uses parallel voting for its lower house elections. For the 2025 elections, 318 seats in the House were contested; 254 of these are district representatives, and 64 are party-list representatives. The number of seats to be disputed may change depending on the creation of new congressional districts.

Philippine law mandates that there should be one party-list representative for every four district representatives. District representatives are elected under the plurality voting system from single-member districts. Party-list representatives are elected via the nationwide vote with a 2% election threshold, with a party winning not more than three seats. The party with the most votes usually wins three seats, then the other parties with more than 2% of the vote two seats. At this point, if all of the party-list seats are not filled up, the parties with less than 2% of the vote will win one seat each until all party-list seats are filled up.

Political parties competing in the party-list election are barred from participating district elections, and vice versa, unless permitted by the Commission on Elections. Party-lists and political parties participating in the district elections may forge coalition deals with one another.

Campaigning for elections from congressional districts seats are decidedly local; the candidates are most likely a part of an election slate that includes candidates for other positions in the locality, and slates may comprise different parties. The political parties contesting the election make no attempt to create a national campaign.

Party-list campaigning, on the other hand, is done on a national scale. Parties usually attempt to appeal to a specific demographic. Polling is usually conducted for the party-list election, while pollsters may release polls on specific district races. In district elections, pollsters do not attempt to make forecasts on how many votes a party would achieve, nor the number of seats a party would win; they do attempt to do that in party-list elections, though.

== Officers ==
The members of the House of Representatives who are also its officers are also ex officio members of all of the committees and have a vote.

On July 28, 2025, the 20th Congress of the Philippines elected among themselves their leaders. The terms of office of the officers elected are set to end on June 30, 2028.

=== Speaker ===
The speaker is the head of the House of Representatives. He presides over the session; decides on all questions of order, subject to appeal by any member; signs all acts, resolutions, memorials, writs, warrants, and subpoenas issued by or upon order of the House; appoints, suspends, dismisses, or disciplines House personnel; and exercise administrative functions.

The speaker is elected by a majority of all the members of the House, including vacant seats. The speaker is traditionally elected at the convening of each congress. Before a speaker is elected, the House secretary general sits as the presiding officer until a speaker is elected. Compared to the Senate president, the unseating of an incumbent speaker is rarer.

The incumbent speaker of the House is representative Bojie Dy, since September 17, 2025, following the resignation of former speaker Martin Romualdez.

=== Deputy speakers ===
There was a position of speaker pro tempore for Congresses prior the reorganization of the officers of the House of Representatives during the 10th Congress in 1995. The speaker pro tempore was the next highest position in the House after the speaker.

The position was replaced by deputy speakers in 1995. Originally, there was one deputy speaker for each island group of Luzon, Visayas and Mindanao. In the 15th Congress starting in 2010, all six deputy speakers are "at-large". In the 16th Congress, the deputy speakers represent the chamber at-large. Starting in the 17th Congress, each region is represented by a deputy speaker, with additional deputy speakers from the party-list ranks.

The deputy speakers perform the speaker's role when the speaker is absent. In case in the resignation of the speaker, the deputy speakers shall elect from among themselves an acting speaker, until a speaker is elected.

The current deputy speakers are representatives Dinand Hernandez of South Cotabato (who is also the senior deputy speaker), Janette Garin of Iloilo, Yasser Balindong of Lanao del Sur, Paolo Ortega of La Union, Jay Khonghun of Zambales, Ronaldo Puno of Antipolo City, Ferjenel Biron of Iloilo, Raymond Mendoza of the TUCP party-list, Yevgeny Emano of Misamis Oriental, David Suarez of Quezon, Maria Rachel Arenas of Pangasinan, Duke Frasco of Cebu, Albee Benitez of Bacolod, and Mercedes Alvarez–Lansang of Negros Occidental.

=== Majority floor leader ===
The majority leader, aside from being the spokesman of the majority bloc, is to direct the deliberations on the floor. The majority leader is also concurrently the chairman of the Committee on Rules. The majority leader is elected in a party caucus of the ruling majority party or coalition of parties forming the majority bloc.

The incumbent House majority leader is representative Sandro Marcos (PFP) from Ilocos Norte's 1st congressional district.

=== Minority floor leader ===
The minority leader is the spokesman of the minority bloc in the House and is an ex-officio member of all standing committees. The minority leader is elected in party caucus of all members of the House in the minority party or coalition of parties forming the minority bloc. By longstanding tradition, the losing candidate in a speakership election is named the minority leader, until the 17th Congress when the minority bloc elected from among its members the minority leader.

The incumbent House minority leader is representative Marcelino Libanan, a party-list member for 4Ps.

=== Secretary general ===
The secretary general enforces orders and decisions of the House; keeps the Journal of each session; notes all questions of order, among other things. The secretary general presides over the chamber at the first legislative session after an election, and is elected by a majority of the members.

At present, Cheloy Garafil is the secretary general of the House of Representatives.

=== Sergeant-at-arms ===
The sergeant-at-arms is responsible for the maintenance of public order in the House of Representatives, among other things. Like the secretary general, the sergeant-at-arms is elected by a majority of the members.

At present, retired Brigadier General Melchor dela Cruz is the sergeant-at-arms of the House of Representatives.

== Qualifications ==
The qualifications for membership in the House are expressly stated in Section 6, Art. VI of the 1987 Philippine Constitution as follows:

- No person shall be a Representative unless he/she is a natural-born citizen of the Philippines, and on the day of the election, is at least 25 years of age, able to read and write, a registered voter except for a party-list representative, and a resident of the country for not less than one year immediately preceding the day of the election.
- The age is fixed at 25 and must be possessed on the day of the elections, that is, when the polls are opened and the votes cast, and not on the day of the proclamation of the winners by the board of canvassers.
- With regard to the residence requirements, it was ruled in the case of Lim v. Pelaez that it must be the place where one habitually resides and to which he, after absence, has the intention of returning.
- The enumeration laid down by the 1987 Constitution is exclusive under the Latin principle of expressio unius est exclusio alterius. This means that Congress cannot anymore add additional qualifications other than those provided by the Constitution.

== Membership ==
There are two types of congressmen: those who represent geographic districts, and those who represent party-lists. The first-past-the-post (simple plurality voting) method is used to determine who represents each of the 254 geographic districts. The party-list representatives are elected via the party-list system. The party-list representatives should always comprise 20% of the seats.

According to the 1987 Constitution, the House of Representatives shall be composed of not more than 250 members. It also mandates party-list representatives shall constitute 20 percent of the total number of representatives. Originally set at 200 in the ordinance of the 1987 Constitution, the number of districts has grown to 254. All of the new districts are via created via piecemeal redistricting of the then existing 200 districts, and via the creation of new provinces and cities. The Supreme Court explicitly clarified that Congress can increase the 250-seat limit piecemeal (one by one) rather than through a single general law. The Constitution gave Congress to nationally redistrict the country after the release of every census but this has not been done.

The original 200 districts meant that there should have been 50 party-list representatives. However, the Constitution did not give the specifics on how party-list congressmen should have been elected. This led to presidents appointing sectoral representatives, which were then approved by the Commission on Appointments; only a handful of sectoral representatives were seated in this way. With the enactment of the Party-List System Act, the first party-list election was in 1998; with the 2% election threshold, a 3-seat cap and tens of parties participating, this led to only about a fraction of the party-list seats being distributed. Eventually, there had been several Supreme Court decisions changing the way the winning seats are distributed, ensuring that all party-list seats are filled up.

There were supposed to be 245 congressional districts that were to be disputed in the 2019 election, so there were 61 party-list seats contested in the party-list election. Elections in two of these districts were delayed due to its creation right before campaigning. The Supreme Court ruled that one district be contested in the next (2022) election, then the Commission on Elections applied the court's ruling to the other district, bringing the number of districts to 243, while still keeping the 61 party-list representatives, for a total of 304 seats.

Vacancies from representatives elected via districts are dealt with special elections, which may be done if the vacancy occurred less than a year before the next regularly scheduled election. Special elections are infrequently done; despite several vacancies, the last special election was in 2023. For party-list representatives, the nominee next on the list is asked to replace the outgoing representative; if the nominee agrees, then that person would be sworn in as a member, if the nominee doesn't agree, then the nominee after that person is asked, and the process is repeated. Vacating party-list representatives have always been replaced this way.

=== Congressional district representation ===
Eighty percent of representatives shall come from congressional districts, with each district returning one representative. The Constitution mandates that every province and every city with a population of 250,000 must have at least one representative. Each legislative district, regardless of population, has one congressman. For provinces that have more than one legislative district, the provincial districts are identical to the corresponding legislative district, with the exclusion of cities that do not vote for provincial officials. If cities are divided into multiple districts for city hall representation purposes, these are also used for congressional representation.

The representatives from the districts comprise at most 80% of the members of the House; therefore, for a party to have a majority of seats in the House, the party needs to win a larger majority of district seats. No party since the approval of the 1987 Constitution has been able to win a majority of seats, hence coalitions are not uncommon.

==== Legislative districts in provinces ====
- Abra (1)
- Agusan del Norte (1)
- Agusan del Sur (2)
- Aklan (2)
- Albay (3)
- Antique (1)
- Apayao (1)
- Aurora (1)
- Basilan (1)
- Bataan (3)
- Batanes (1)
- Batangas (6) (Note: The component cities of Batangas and Lipa are officially known as the 5th and 6th Districts of Batangas, respectively.)
- Benguet (1)
- Biliran (1)
- Bohol (3)
- Bukidnon (4)
- Bulacan (6) (Note: The component city of San Jose del Monte is represented separately from Bulacan, but remains as part of the province's 4th District for the purpose of electing Sangguniang Panlalawigan members.)
- Cagayan (3)
- Camarines Norte (2)
- Camarines Sur (5) (Note: The independent-component city of Naga remains part of Camarines Sur's congressional representation.)
- Camiguin (1)
- Capiz (2)
- Catanduanes (1)
- Cavite (8) (Note: The component cities of Bacoor, Dasmariñas, General Trias and Imus are officially known as the 2nd, 4th, 6th and 3rd Districts of Cavite, respectively.)
- Cebu (7)
- Cotabato (3)
- Davao de Oro (2)
- Davao del Norte (2)
- Davao Occidental (1)
- Davao Oriental (2)
- Davao del Sur (1)
- Dinagat Islands (1)
- Eastern Samar (1)
- Guimaras (1)
- Ifugao (1)
- Ilocos Norte (2)
- Ilocos Sur (2)
- Iloilo (5)
- Isabela (6) (Note: The independent-component city of Santiago remains part of Isabela's congressional representation.)
- Kalinga (1)
- La Union (2)
- Laguna (4) (Note: The component cities of Biñan and Calamba are represented separately from Laguna, but remains as part of the province's 1st and 2nd Districts, respectively, for the purpose of electing Sangguniang Panlalawigan members. The component city of Santa Rosa will be represented separately from Laguna starting 2022, but will remain part of the province's 1st SP district.)
- Lanao del Norte (2)
- Lanao del Sur (2)
- Leyte (5) (Note: The highly urbanized city of Tacloban and the independent-component city of Ormoc remain part of Leyte's congressional representation.)
- Maguindanao del Norte (1) (Note: The independent-component city of Cotabato remains part of Maguindanao's congressional representation.)
- Maguindanao del Sur (1)
- Marinduque (1)
- Masbate (3)
- Misamis Occidental (2)
- Misamis Oriental (2)
- Mountain Province (1)
- Negros Occidental (6)
- Negros Oriental (3)
- Northern Samar (2)
- Nueva Ecija (4)
- Nueva Vizcaya (1)
- Occidental Mindoro (1)
- Oriental Mindoro (2)
- Palawan (3) (Note: The highly urbanized city of Puerto Princesa remains part of Palawan's congressional representation.)
- Pampanga (4) (Note: The highly urbanized city of Angeles remains part of Pampanga's congressional representation.)
- Pangasinan (6) (Note: The independent-component city of Dagupan remains part of Pangasinan's congressional representation.)
- Quezon (4) (Note: The highly urbanized city of Lucena remains part of Quezon's congressional representation.)
- Quirino (1)
- Rizal (4) (Note: The component city of Antipolo is represented separately from Rizal, but returns one member from each of its districts to the province's Sangguniang Panlalawigan.)
- Romblon (1)
- Samar (2)
- Sarangani (1)
- Siquijor (1)
- Sorsogon (2)
- South Cotabato (3)
- Southern Leyte (2)
- Sultan Kudarat (2)
- Sulu (2)
- Surigao del Norte (2)
- Surigao del Sur (2)
- Tarlac (3)
- Tawi-Tawi (1)
- Zambales (2) (Note: The highly urbanized city of Olongapo remains part of Zambales's congressional representation.)
- Zamboanga del Norte (3)
- Zamboanga del Sur (2)
- Zamboanga Sibugay (2)

==== Legislative districts in cities ====
- Antipolo (2)
- Bacolod (1)
- Baguio (1)
- Biñan (1)
- Butuan (1)
- Cagayan de Oro (2)
- Calamba (1)
- Caloocan (3)
- Cebu City (2)
- Davao City (3)
- Iligan (1)
- General Santos (1)
- Iloilo City (1)
- Lapu-Lapu (1)
- Las Piñas (1)
- Makati (2)
- Malabon (1)
- Mandaluyong (1)
- Mandaue (1)
- Manila (6)
- Marikina (2)
- Muntinlupa (1)
- Navotas (1)
- Parañaque (2)
- Pasay (1)
- Pasig (1)
- Pateros and Taguig (1)
- Quezon City (6)
- San Jose del Monte (1)
- San Juan (1)
- Santa Rosa (1)
- Taguig (1)
- Valenzuela (2)
- Zamboanga City (2)

=== Party-list representation ===
The party-list system is the name designated for party-list representation. Under the 1987 Constitution, the electorate can vote for certain party-list organizations in order to give voice to significant minorities of society that would otherwise not be adequately represented through geographical district. From 1987 to 1998, party-list representatives were appointed by the President.

Since 1998, each voter votes for a single party-list organization. Organizations that garner at least 2% of the total number of votes are awarded one representative for every 2% up to a maximum of three representatives. Thus, there can be at most 50 party-list representatives in Congress, though usually no more than 20 are elected because many organizations do not reach the required 2% minimum number of votes.

After the 2007 election, in a controversial decision, the Supreme Court ordered the COMELEC to change how it allocates the party-list seats. Under the new formula only one party will have the maximum 3 seats. It based its decision on a formula contained in the VFP vs. COMELEC decision. In 2009, in the BANAT vs. COMELEC decision, it was changed anew in which parties with less than 2% of the vote were given seats to fulfill the 20% quota as set forth in the Constitution.

Aside from determining which party won and allocating the number of seats won per party, another point of contention was whether the nominees should be a member of the marginalized group they are supposed to represent; in the Ang Bagong Bayani vs. COMELEC decision, the Supreme Court not only ruled that the nominees should be a member of the marginalized sector, but it also disallowed major political parties from participating in the party-list election. However, on the BANAT decision, the court ruled that since the law did not specify who belongs to a marginalized sector, the court allowed anyone to be a nominee as long as the nominee as a member of the party (not necessarily the marginalized group the party is supposed to represent).

=== Sectoral representation ===
Prior to the enactment of the Party-list Act, the president, with the advice and consent of the Commission on Appointments, nominated sectoral representatives. These represented various sectors, from labor, peasants, urban poor, the youth, women and cultural communities. Their numbers grew from 15 members in the 8th Congress, to 32 in the 10th Congress.

In the Interim Batasang Pambansa, a sectoral election was held to fill up the sectoral seats of parliament.

=== Legislative caretakers ===
Under the Republic Act No. 6645 or "An Act Prescribing the Manner of Filling a Vacancy in the Congress of the Philippines", if a seat was vacated with at most 18 months prior to an election the House of Representatives could request the Commission on Elections to hold a special election to fill in the vacancy. The law does not specify for a mechanism if the seat was vacated within 18 months prior to an election. The House of Representatives through its speaker customarily appoints a caretaker or legislative liaison officer to fill in the vacancy. The caretaker cannot vote in the name of the district that is being taken care of.

== Redistricting ==
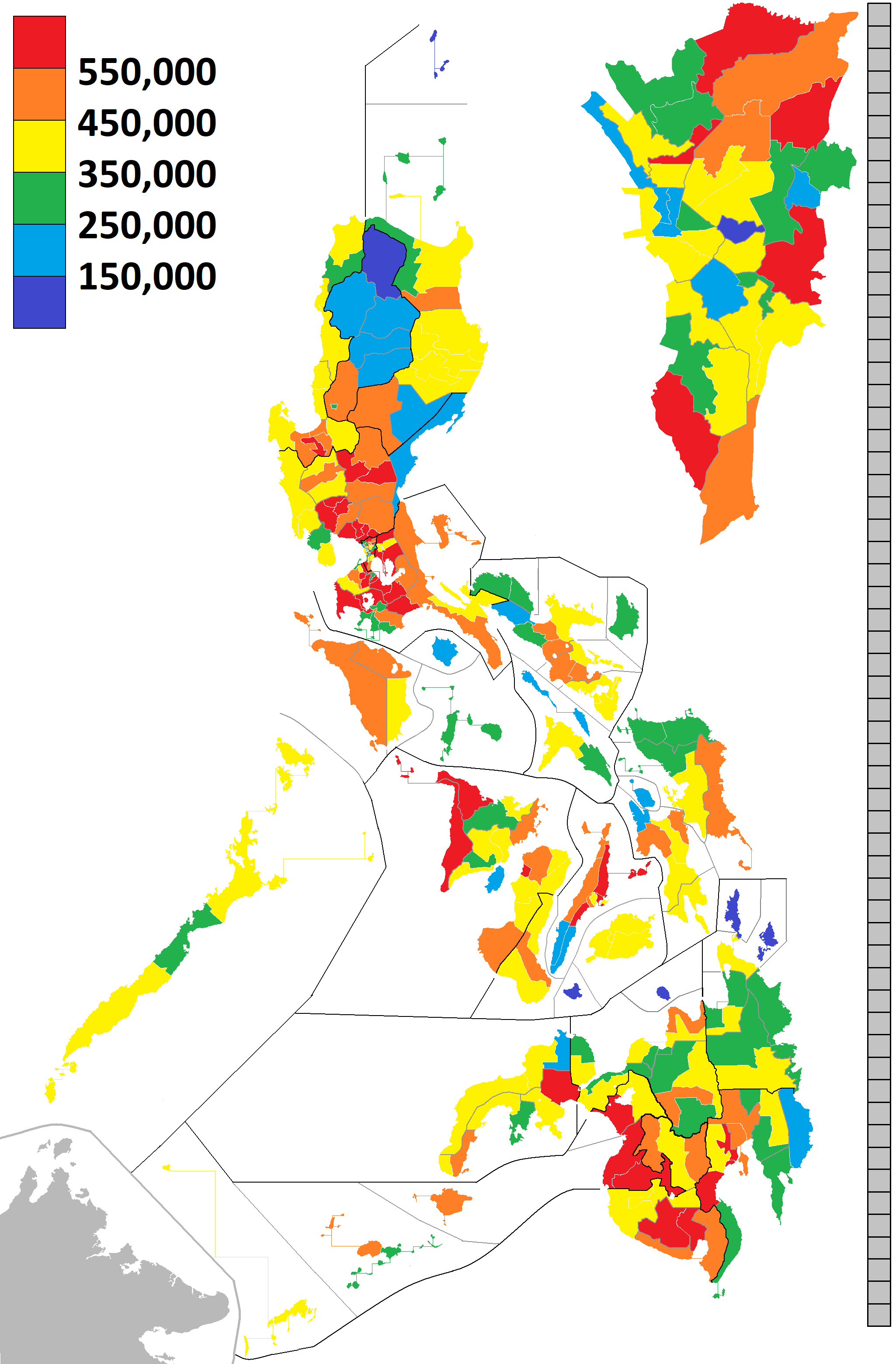
Population of each congressional district in the Philippines. Districts shaded with blue hues have less than 250,000 people, those shaded green are just over 250,000, yellow and orange are more than 250,000, and those shaded red can be split into two or more districts.

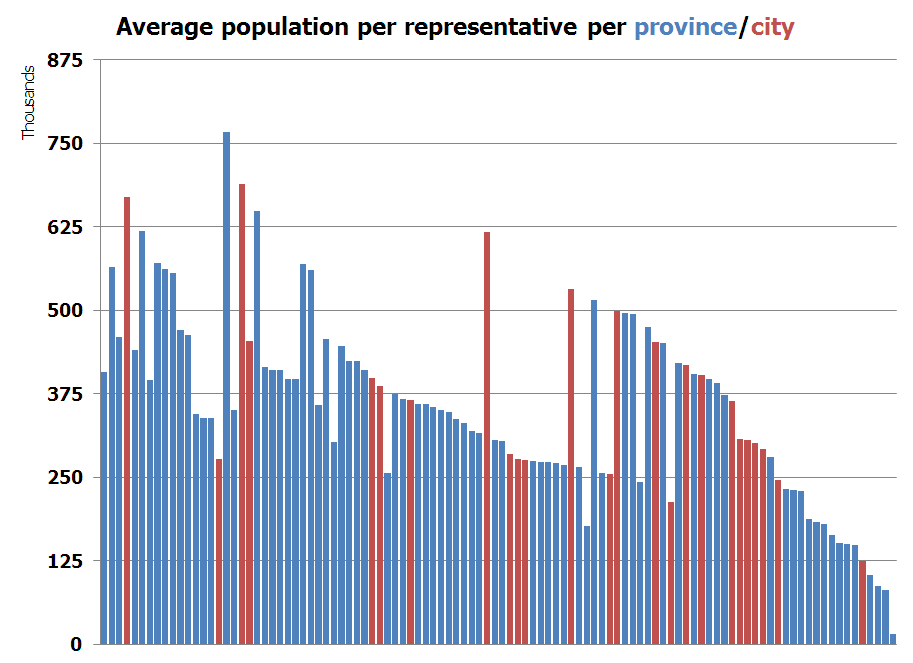
Persons per representative per province or city in the House of Representatives: Provinces (blue) and cities (red) are arranged in descending order of population from Cavite to Batanes (provinces) and from Quezon City to San Juan (cities).

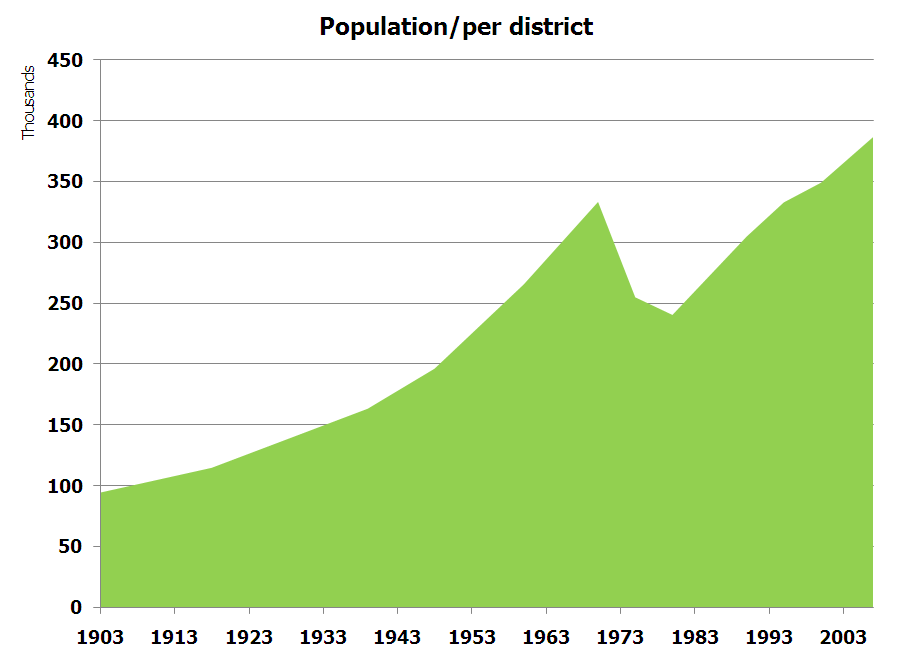
Persons per representative from 1903 to 2007. The last nationwide apportionment act was the ordinance to the 1987 Constitution, which was based on the 1980 census.

Congress is mandated to reapportion the legislative districts within three years following the return of every census. Since its restoration in 1987, Congress has not passed any general apportionment law, despite the publication of eight censuses in 1990, 1995, 2000, 2007, 2010, 2015, 2020 and 2024. The increase in the number of representative districts since 1987 were mostly due to the creation of new provinces, cities, and piecemeal redistricting of certain provinces and cities.

The apportionment of congressional districts is not dependent upon a specially mandated independent government body, but rather through republic acts which are drafted by members of Congress. Therefore, apportionment often can be influenced by political motivations. Incumbent representatives who are not permitted by law to serve after three consecutive terms sometimes resort to dividing their district, or even creating a new province which will be guaranteed a seat, just so that their allies be able to run, while "switching offices" with them. Likewise, politicians whose political fortunes are likely to be jeopardized by any change in district boundaries may delay or even ignore the need for reapportionment.

Since 1987, the creation of some new congressional districts has been met with controversy, especially due to incumbent political clans and their allies benefiting from the new district arrangements. Some of these new congressional districts are tied to the creation of a new province, because such an act necessarily entails the creation of a new congressional district.

- Creation of Davao Occidental, 2013: The rival Cagas and Bautista clans dominate politics in the province of Davao del Sur; their members have been elected as congressional representatives for the first and second districts of the province since 1987. However, the province's governorship has been in contest between the two clans in recent years: Claude Bautista, the current governor, was elected in 2013; before that Douglas Cagas served as governor from 2007 to 2013, after succeeding Benjamin Bautista Jr. who served from 2002 to 2007. Supporters of both clans have been subjected to political violence, prompting the police to put the province of Davao del Sur in the election watchlist. The law which created Davao Occidental, Republic Act No. 10360, was co-authored by House Representatives Marc Douglas Cagas IV and Franklin Bautista as House Bill 4451; the creation of the new province is seen as a way to halt the "often violent" political rivalry between the clans by ensuring that the Cagas and Bautista clans have separate domains.
- Reapportionment of Camarines Sur, 2009: A new congressional district was created within Camarines Sur under Republic Act No. 9716, which resulted in the reduction of the population of the province's first district to below the Constitutional ideal of 250,000 inhabitants. The move was seen as a form of political accommodation that would (and ultimately did) prevent two allies of then-President Gloria Macapagal Arroyo from running in the same district. Rolando Andaya, who was on his third term as congressman for the first district, was appointed budget secretary in 2006; his plans to run as representative of the same district in 2010 put him in direct competition with Diosdado Macapagal Arroyo, the president's youngest son, who was also seeking re-election. Then-senator Noynoy Aquino challenged the constitutionality of the law but the Supreme Court ultimately ruled that the creation of the new district was constitutional.
- Creation of Dinagat Islands, 2007: The separation of Dinagat Islands from Surigao del Norte has further solidified the hold of the Ecleo clan over the impoverished and typhoon-prone area, which remains among the poorest provinces in the country.

=== Most populous legislative districts ===
Currently the district with the lowest population is the lone district of Batanes, with only 18,831 inhabitants in 2020. The most populous congressional district, the first district of Rizal, has around 69 times more inhabitants. Data below reflect the district boundaries for the 2019 elections, and the population counts from the 2020 census.

Rank	Legislative district	Population (2020)
1	Rizal–1st	1,207,509
2	Caloocan–1st	953,125
3	Maguindanao del Norte at-large	943,500
4	Pampanga–1st	880,360
5	Cebu–1st	809,335
6	Pasig at-large	803,159
7	Pampanga–3rd	782,547
8	Batangas–3rd	768,561
9	Bulacan–1st	758,872
10	Quezon–2nd	753,343

=== Underrepresentation ===
Because of the lack of a nationwide reapportionment after the publication of every census since the Constitution was promulgated in 1987, faster-growing provinces and cities have become severely underrepresented. Each legislative district is ideally supposed to encompass a population of 250,000.

== Powers ==
The Philippine House of Representatives is modeled after the United States House of Representatives; the two chambers of Congress have roughly equal powers, and every bill or resolution that has to go through both houses needs the consent of both chambers before being passed for the president's signature. Once a bill is defeated in the House of Representatives, it is lost. Once a bill is approved by the House of Representatives on third reading, the bill is passed to the Senate, unless an exact identical bill has also been passed by the upper house. When a counterpart bill in the Senate is different from the one passed by the House of Representatives, either a bicameral conference committee is created consisting of members from both chambers of Congress to reconcile the differences, or either chamber may instead approve the other chamber's version.

Just like most lower houses, franchise and money bills originate in the House of Representatives, but the Senate may still propose or concur with amendments, same with bills of local application and private bills. The House of Representatives has the sole power to initiate impeachment proceedings, and may impeach an official by a vote of one-third of its members. Once an official is impeached, the Senate tries that official. The requirement that legislation be approved by both chambers encourages coordination between the House of Representatives and the Senate, reinforcing institutional balance and promoting consensus-based lawmaking within the Philippine political system.

== Seat ==
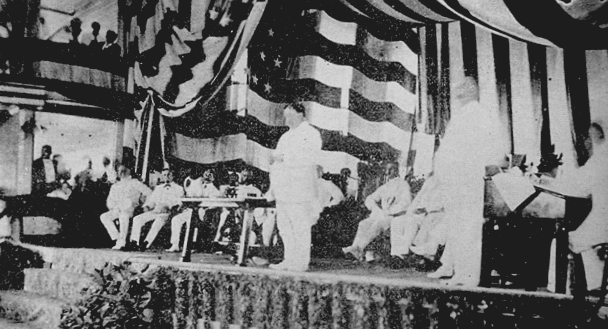
William Howard Taft addressing the 1st Philippine Legislature at the Manila Grand Opera House in 1907.

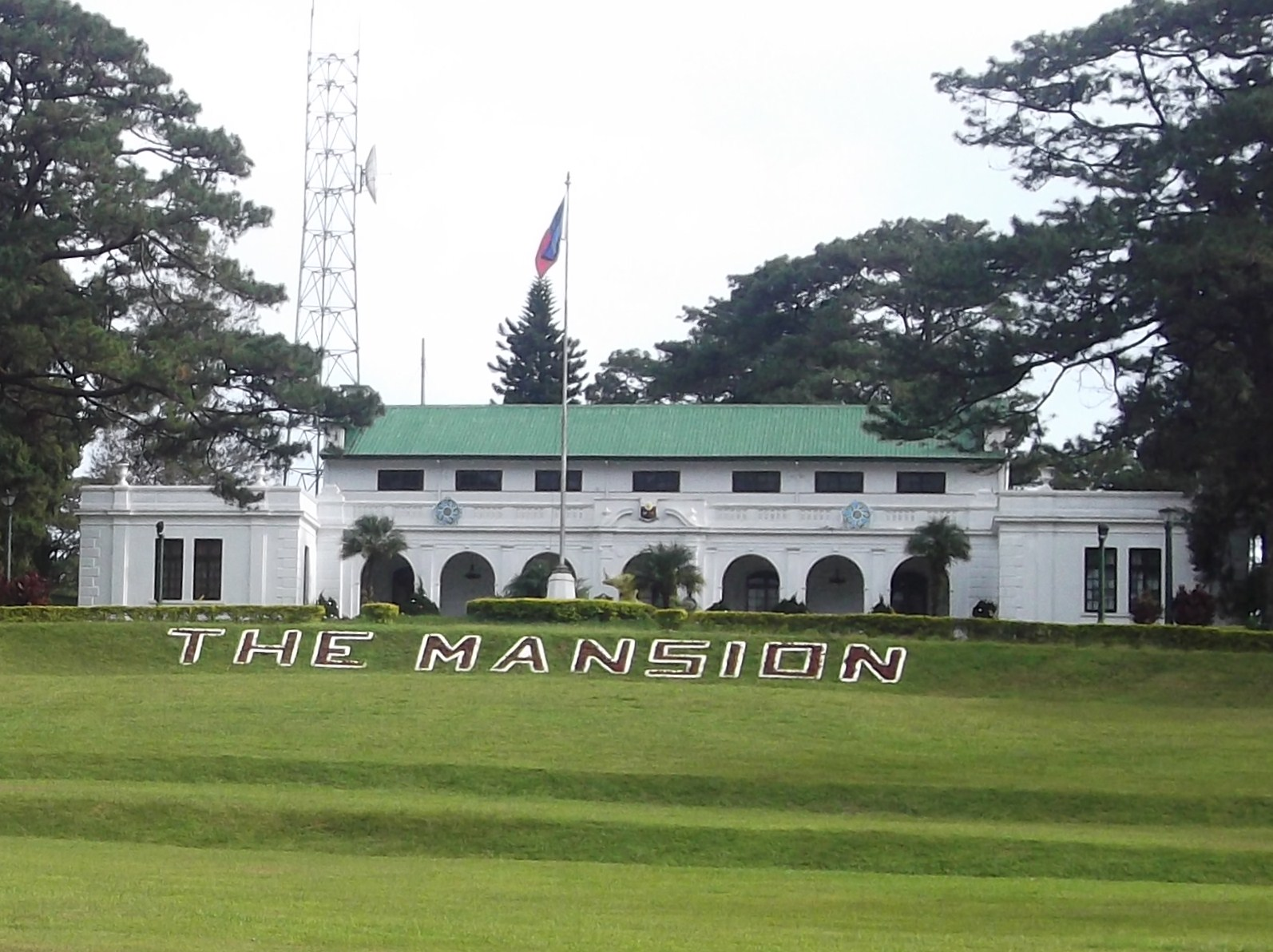
The 2nd Philippine Legislature convened at The Mansion in Baguio in 1921.

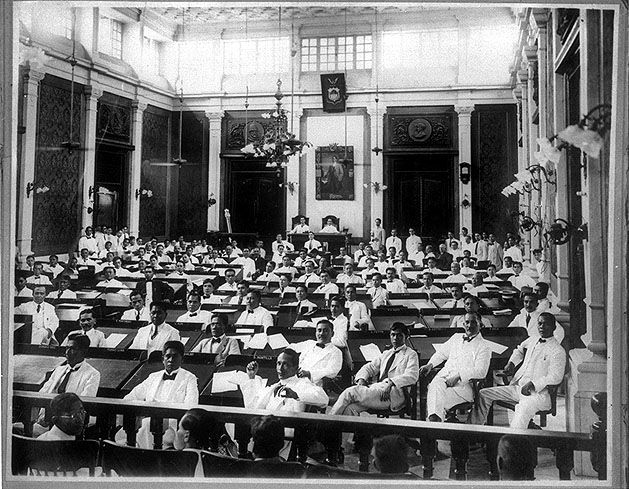
Joint session of the Philippine Legislature, Manila. November 15, 1916

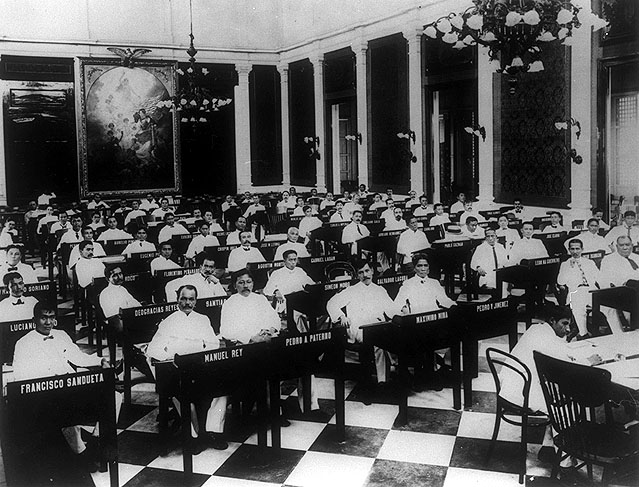
Philippine legislature before 1924

An undated photograph of a session of the 6th Congress

The Batasang Pambansa Complex in Quezon City is the seat of the House of Representatives since its restoration in 1987; it took its name from the Batasang Pambansa, the national parliament which convened there from 1978 to 1986.

The Philippine Legislature was inaugurated at the Manila Grand Opera House at 1907, then it conducted business at the Ayuntamiento in Intramuros. Governor-General Leonard Wood summoned the 2nd Philippine Legislature at Baguio and convened at The Mansion in Baguio for three weeks. The legislature returned to the Ayuntamiento, as the Legislative Building was being constructed; it first convened there on July 26, 1926. The House of Representatives continued to occupy the second floor until 1945 when the area was shelled during the Battle of Manila. The building was damaged beyond repair and Congress convened at the Old Japanese Schoolhouse at Lepanto (modern-day S. H. Loyola) Street, Manila until the Legislative Building can be occupied again in 1949. Congress stayed at the Legislative Building, by now called the Congress Building, until President Marcos shut Congress and ruled by decree starting in 1972.

Marcos then oversaw the construction of the new home of parliament at Quezon City, which convened in 1978. The parliament, called the Batasang Pambansa continued to sit there until the passage of the 1986 Freedom Constitution. The House of Representatives inherited the Batasang Pambansa Complex in 1987.

=== Batasang Pambansa Complex ===
The Batasang Pambansa Complex, now officially called the House of Representatives Building Complex, is at the National Government Center, Constitution Hills, Quezon City. Accessible via Commonwealth Avenue, the complex consists of four buildings. The main building hosts the session hall; the North and South wings, inaugurated in December 1977, are attached to it. The newest building, the Ramon Mitra, Jr. Building, was completed in 2001. It houses the Legislative Library, committee offices, the Reference and Research Bureau, and conference rooms.

== Current composition ==
The members of the House of Representatives, aside from being grouped into political parties, are also grouped into the "majority bloc", "minority bloc" and "independents" (different from the independent in the sense that they are not affiliated into a political party). Originally, members who voted for the winning Speaker belong to the majority and members who voted for the opponent are the minority. The majority and minority bloc are to elect amongst themselves a floor leader. While members are allowed to switch blocs, they must do so in writing. Also, the bloc where they intend to transfer shall accept their application through writing. When the bloc the member ought to transfer refuses to accept the transferring member, or a member does not want to be a member of either bloc, that member becomes an independent member. A member that transfers to a new bloc forfeits one's committee chairmanships and memberships, until the bloc the member transfers to elects the member to committees.

The membership in each committee should be in proportion to the size of each bloc, with each bloc deciding who amongst them who will go to each committee, upon a motion by the floor leader concerned to the House of Representatives in plenary. The speaker, deputy speakers, floor leaders, deputy floor leaders and the chairperson of the Committee on Accounts can vote in committees; the committee chairperson can only vote to break a tie.

To ensure that the representatives each get their pork barrel, most of them will join the majority bloc, or even to the president's party, as basis of patronage politics (known as the padrino system locally); thus, the House of Representatives always aligns itself with the party of the sitting president.

The majority bloc sits at the right side of the speaker, facing the House of Representatives.

=== Leadership ===
- House Speaker: Bojie Dy
- Senior Deputy Speaker: Ferdinand Hernandez
- Deputy Speakers:
  - Janette Garin
  - Yasser Balindong
  - Paolo Ortega
  - Jay Khonghun
  - Ronaldo Puno
  - Ferjenel Biron
  - Raymond Mendoza
  - Yevgeny Emano
  - David Suarez
  - Maria Rachel Arenas
  - Duke Frasco
  - Albee Benitez
  - Mercedes Alvarez–Lansang
- Majority Floor Leader: Sandro Marcos
- Minority Floor Leader: Marcelino Libanan
- Secretary General: Cheloy Garafil
- Sergeant-at-Arms: BGen. Ferdinand Melchor C. dela Cruz, PA (Ret.)

=== 20th Congress standing committees ===
Committee	Committee Chairman
Accounts	Maricar Zamora
Agrarian Reform	Eleanor Begtang
Appropriations	Mikaela Suansing
Agriculture and Food	Mark Enverga
Aquaculture and Fisheries Resources	Hori Horibata
Banks and Financial Intermediaries	Irwin Tieng
Basic Education and Culture	Roman Romulo
Civil Service and Professional Regulation	Laarni Roque
Climate Change	Aniela Tolentino
Constitutional Amendments	Rufus Rodriguez
Cooperatives Development	Felimon Espares
Dangerous Drugs	Jonathan Keith Flores
Disaster Resilience	Joseph Lara
Ecology	Vanvan Aumentado
Economic Affairs	Antonio Legarda Jr.
Energy	Jose Alvarez
Ethics and Privileges	Jonathan Clement Abalos
Flagship Programs and Projects	Jose Arturo Garcia Jr.
Foreign Affairs	Maria Rachel Arenas
Games and Amusements	Antonio Ferrer
Good Government and Public Accountability	Joel Chua
Government Enterprises and Privatization	Eric Olivarez
Government Reorganization	Salvador Pleyto
Health	Jun Gato
Higher and Technical Education	Jude Acidre
Housing and Urban Development	Ma. Victoria Co-Pilar
Human Rights	Benny Abante
Indigenous Cultural Communities and Indigenous Peoples	Mauricio Domogan
Information and Communications Technology	Miguel Luis Villafuerte
Inter-Parliamentary Relations and Diplomacy	Gina de Venecia
Justice	Gerville Luistro
Labor and Employment	Jolo Revilla
Legislative Franchises	Jeffrey Ferrer
Local Government	Florencio Miraflores
Metro Manila Development	Dean Asistio
Micro, Small and Medium Enterprise Development	Odie Tarriela
Mindanao Affairs	Jason Almonte
Muslim Affairs	Dimple Mastura
National Defense and Security	Oscar Malapitan
Natural Resources	Alfredo Marañon III
North Luzon Growth Quadrangle	Angelo Marcos Barba
Overseas Workers Affairs	Bryan Revilla
People's Participation	Marcelino Teodoro
Population and Family Relations	Edwin Ongchuan
Poverty Alleviation	Gloria Macapagal Arroyo
Public Accounts	Terry Ridon
Public Information	Lordan Suan
Public Order and Safety	Rolando Valeriano
Public Works and Highways	Romeo Momo
Revision of Laws	Dino Tanjuatco
Rules	Sandro Marcos
Rural Development	Wilton Kho
Science and Technology	Jules Ledesma
Senior Citizens	Milagros Aquino-Magsaysay
Social Services	Cheeno Almario
Suffrage and Electoral Reforms	Zia Alonto Adiong
Sustainable Development Goals	Jose Manuel Alba
Tourism	Eleandro Madrona
Trade and Industry	Maximo Dalog
Transportation	Franz Pumaren
Veterans Affairs and Welfare	Rudy Caoagdan
Visayas Development	Lolita Javier
Ways and Means	Miro Quimbo
Welfare of Children	Richelle Singson-Michael
Women and Gender Equality	Ann Matibag
Youth and Sports Development	Faustino Michael Carlos Dy III

== Latest election ==
Elections were held on May 12, 2025.

=== Elections at congressional districts ===
Party	Votes	%	+/–	Seats	+/–
Lakas–CMD	16,596,698	32.87	+23.70	103	+77
National Unity Party	6,080,987	12.05	+0.13	32	−1
Nationalist People's Coalition	5,974,201	11.83	−0.60	31	−4
Partido Federal ng Pilipinas	5,286,538	10.47	+9.53	27	+25
Nacionalista Party	4,724,803	9.36	−4.38	22	−14
Liberal Party	1,555,941	3.08	−0.70	6	−4
Aksyon Demokratiko	1,341,540	2.66	+0.72	2	+2
PDP–Laban	666,067	1.32	−21.45	2	−64
Hugpong sa Tawong Lungsod	542,710	1.07	+0.93	3	+3
Laban ng Demokratikong Pilipino	314,981	0.62	−0.16	2	+1
People's Reform Party	292,665	0.58	−1.38	1	−2
Pwersa ng Masang Pilipino	269,949	0.53	+0.52	2	+2
United Bangsamoro Justice Party	236,857	0.47	−0.14	0	0
Unang Sigaw	183,912	0.36	−0.29	0	0
Makatizens United Party	150,189	0.30	New	2	New
Sama Sama Tarlac	143,868	0.28	New	0	0
United Nationalist Alliance	142,655	0.28	+0.14	1	0
Katipunan ng Nagkakaisang Pilipino	134,137	0.27	+0.26	0	0
National Unity Party/United Negros Alliance	130,023	0.26	−0.27	1	−1
Centrist Democratic Party of the Philippines	127,646	0.25	−0.02	1	0
Partido Navoteño	116,622	0.23	+0.06	1	0
One Capiz	109,249	0.22	New	0	0
Reform PH Party	107,966	0.21	New	0	0
Lakas–CMD/One Cebu	104,768	0.21	New	1	New
Adelante Zamboanga Party	100,035	0.20	+0.05	1	0
Padajon Surigao	99,856	0.20	New	0	0
Galing at Serbisyo para sa Mindoreño	91,073	0.18	New	0	0
Filipino Rights Protection Advocates of Manila Movement	87,183	0.17	New	0	0
Nationalist People's Coalition/One Cebu	74,936	0.15	New	1	New
Asenso Manileño	70,780	0.14	New	1	0
Akay National Political Party	68,524	0.14	New	0	0
Workers' and Peasants' Party	50,618	0.10	+0.00	0	0
Kusog Bicolandia	33,789	0.07	New	0	0
Partido Lakas ng Masa	28,746	0.06	+0.05	0	0
Asenso Abrenio	23,308	0.05	New	0	0
Makabayan	22,698	0.04	New	0	0
Partido Demokratiko Sosyalista ng Pilipinas	14,343	0.03	−0.13	0	0
Partido para sa Demokratikong Reporma	12,672	0.03	−0.96	0	0
Independent	4,371,611	8.66	+4.23	11	+5
Party-list seats				64	+1
Total	50,485,144	100.00	–	318	+1
Valid votes	50,485,144	88.46	+1.48		
Invalid/blank votes	6,585,150	11.54	−1.48		
Total votes	57,070,294	100.00	–		
Registered voters/turnout	68,431,965	83.40	−0.70		
Source: COMELEC (results per district, registered voters)

=== Party-list election ===
Party	Votes	%	Seats	+/–
Akbayan	2,779,621	7.02	3	+2
Tingog Party List	1,822,708	4.60	3	+1
4Ps Partylist	1,469,571	3.71	2	0
ACT-CIS Partylist	1,239,930	3.13	2	−1
Ako Bicol	1,073,119	2.71	2	0
Uswag Ilonggo	777,754	1.96	1	0
Solid North Party	765,322	1.93	1	New
Trabaho Partylist	709,283	1.79	1	+1
Citizens' Battle Against Corruption	593,911	1.50	1	0
Malasakit at Bayanihan	580,100	1.46	1	0
Senior Citizens Partylist	577,753	1.46	1	0
Puwersa ng Pilipinong Pandagat	575,762	1.45	1	New
Mamamayang Liberal	547,949	1.38	1	New
FPJ Panday Bayanihan	538,003	1.36	1	New
United Senior Citizens Partylist	533,913	1.35	1	0
4K Partylist	521,592	1.32	1	New
LPG Marketers Association	517,833	1.31	1	0
Coop-NATCCO	509,913	1.29	1	0
Ako Bisaya	477,796	1.21	1	0
Construction Workers Solidarity	477,517	1.21	1	0
Pinoy Workers Partylist	475,985	1.20	1	New
AGAP Partylist	469,412	1.19	1	0
Asenso Pinoy	423,133	1.07	1	+1
Agimat Partylist	420,813	1.06	1	0
TGP Partylist	407,922	1.03	1	0
SAGIP Partylist	405,297	1.02	1	−1
Alona Partylist	393,684	0.99	1	0
1-Rider Partylist	385,700	0.97	1	−1
Kamanggagawa	382,657	0.97	1	New
Galing sa Puso Party	381,880	0.96	1	0
Kamalayan	381,437	0.96	1	+1
Bicol Saro	366,177	0.92	1	0
Kusug Tausug	365,916	0.92	1	0
Alliance of Concerned Teachers	353,631	0.89	1	0
One Coop	334,098	0.84	1	+1
KM Ngayon Na	324,405	0.82	1	+1
Abante Mindanao	320,349	0.81	1	New
Bagong Henerasyon	319,803	0.81	1	0
Trade Union Congress Party	314,814	0.79	1	0
Kabataan	312,344	0.79	1	0
APEC Partylist	310,427	0.78	1	0
Magbubukid	310,289	0.78	1	New
1Tahanan	309,761	0.78	1	+1
Ako Ilocano Ako	301,406	0.76	1	0
Manila Teachers Party-List	301,291	0.76	1	0
Nanay Partylist	293,430	0.74	1	New
Kapuso PM	293,149	0.74	1	New
SSS-GSIS Pensyonado	290,359	0.73	1	New
DUMPER Partylist	279,532	0.71	1	0
Abang Lingkod	274,735	0.69	1	0
Pusong Pinoy	266,623	0.67	1	0
Swerte	261,379	0.66	1	New
Philreca Party-List	261,045	0.66	1	0
Gabriela Women's Party (Note: Proclaimed as winner on September 17, 2025 by virtue of the COMELEC declaring a 64th seat being up)	256,811	0.65	1	0
Abono Partylist (Note: Proclaimed as winner on October 2, 2025 by virtue of Duterte Youth's disqualification)	254,474	0.64	1	0
Ang Probinsyano Party-list	250,886	0.63	1	0
Murang Kuryente Partylist	247,754	0.63	1	New
OFW Partylist	246,609	0.62	0	−1
Apat-Dapat	245,060	0.62	0	0
Tupad	243,152	0.61	0	0
Kalinga Partylist	235,186	0.59	0	0
1-Pacman Party List	233,096	0.59	0	−1
ANGAT Partylist	229,707	0.58	0	−1
Magsasaka Partylist	225,371	0.57	0	−1
P3PWD	214,605	0.54	0	−1
Barangay Health Wellness Partylist	203,719	0.51	0	−1
Democratic Independent Workers Association	195,829	0.49	0	0
Epanaw Sambayanan	188,505	0.48	0	0
Probinsyano Ako	185,606	0.47	0	−1
Toda Aksyon	183,111	0.46	0	0
Pinuno Partylist	181,066	0.46	0	−1
Serbisyo sa Bayan Party	175,520	0.44	0	0
Abante Pangasinan-Ilokano Party	170,795	0.43	0	−1
AGRI Partylist	168,032	0.42	0	−1
Asap Na	164,030	0.41	0	0
Bayan Muna	162,894	0.41	0	0
Eduaksyon	161,517	0.41	0	0
Akay ni Sol	159,748	0.40	0	0
Ahon Mahirap	157,991	0.40	0	0
1Munti Partylist	157,665	0.40	0	0
H.E.L.P. Pilipinas	157,308	0.40	0	0
A Teacher Partylist	157,116	0.40	0	0
Babae Ako	157,041	0.40	0	0
Anakalusugan	154,121	0.39	0	−1
Pilipinas Babangon Muli	154,025	0.39	0	0
Batang Quiapo Partylist	153,637	0.39	0	0
Lunas	151,494	0.38	0	0
Kabalikat ng Mamamayan	141,847	0.36	0	−1
WIFI	141,041	0.36	0	0
Aangat Tayo	140,597	0.35	0	0
Laang Kawal	136,484	0.34	0	0
Ako Padayon	134,292	0.34	0	0
Solo Parents	131,659	0.33	0	0
Pamilya Ko	124,228	0.31	0	0
Pamilyang Magsasaka	117,440	0.30	0	0
ANGKASANGGA	115,720	0.29	0	0
Kasambahay	111,269	0.28	0	0
Bangon Bagong Minero	111,174	0.28	0	0
Pamilya Muna	108,483	0.27	0	0
Kababaihan	107,848	0.27	0	0
AA-Kasosyo Party	107,262	0.27	0	0
Tulungan Tayo	106,504	0.27	0	0
Health Workers	105,512	0.27	0	0
1Agila	104,868	0.26	0	0
Boses Party-List	102,588	0.26	0	0
Buhay Party-List	99,365	0.25	0	0
Ipatupad For Workers	96,735	0.24	0	0
Gilas	96,646	0.24	0	0
Bunyog Party	93,825	0.24	0	0
Vendors Partylist	88,845	0.22	0	0
Bayaning Tsuper	84,204	0.21	0	0
Bisaya Gyud Party-List	79,915	0.20	0	0
Magdalo Party-List	78,984	0.20	0	0
Maharlikang Pilipino Party	78,700	0.20	0	0
Arangkada Pilipino	75,493	0.19	0	0
Bagong Maunlad na Pilipinas	70,595	0.18	0	0
Damayang Filipino	68,480	0.17	0	0
Partido sa Bagong Pilipino	68,085	0.17	0	0
Heal PH	67,085	0.17	0	0
Ang Tinig ng Seniors	66,553	0.17	0	0
Ako OFW	60,230	0.15	0	0
Aksyon Dapat	58,916	0.15	0	0
Aktibong Kaagapay	55,829	0.14	0	0
UGB Partylist	53,633	0.14	0	0
Ang Komadrona	53,017	0.13	0	0
United Frontliners	52,338	0.13	0	0
Gabay	52,109	0.13	0	0
Tictok	51,354	0.13	0	0
Ako Tanod	49,553	0.13	0	0
Barangay Natin	49,364	0.12	0	0
Abante Bisdak	49,114	0.12	0	0
Turismo	47,645	0.12	0	0
Ang Bumbero ng Pilipinas	47,027	0.12	0	0
BFF	45,816	0.12	0	0
Pinoy Ako	44,419	0.11	0	0
Patrol Partylist	41,570	0.10	0	−1
Tutok To Win Party-List	41,036	0.10	0	−1
Lingap	38,564	0.10	0	0
Maagap	35,871	0.09	0	0
PBA Partylist	35,078	0.09	0	−1
Ilocano Defenders	32,028	0.08	0	0
Pamana	31,526	0.08	0	0
Kaunlad Pinoy	30,898	0.08	0	0
Juan Pinoy	27,523	0.07	0	0
Rebolusyonaryong Alyansang Makabansa	26,771	0.07	0	0
Arise	26,565	0.07	0	0
Click Party	25,914	0.07	0	0
MPBL Partylist	23,189	0.06	0	0
PROMDI	23,144	0.06	0	0
Bida Katagumpay	20,885	0.05	0	0
Hugpong Federal	19,028	0.05	0	0
Arte	14,169	0.04	0	0
Peoples Champ Guardians Partylist	11,492	0.03	0	0
Sulong Dignidad	8,120	0.02	0	0
Total	39,611,775	100.00	64	+1
Valid votes	39,611,775	69.07	+3.62	
Invalid/blank votes (Note: Includes 2,338,564 votes for Duterte Youth, which the Commission on Elections (COMELEC) second division cancelled its registration on June 18, 2025, which was later affirmed by the COMELEC en banc, thereby preventing all of its nominees from assuming their seats. The COMELEC then proclaimed three party-lists with one seat each as winners.)	17,739,183	30.93	−3.62	
Total votes	57,350,958	100.00	–	
Registered voters/turnout	69,673,655	82.31	−0.67	
Source: COMELEC (vote totals)

== See also ==
- 2007 Batasang Pambansa bombing
- Politics of the Philippines
- Batasang Pambansa
- Congress TV
