= List of members of the House of Representatives of the Philippines (A) =

This is a complete list of past and present members of the House of Representatives of the Philippines whose last names begin with the letter A.

This list also includes members of the Philippine Assembly (1907–1916), the Commonwealth National Assembly (1935–1941), the Second Republic National Assembly (1943–1944) and the Batasang Pambansa (1978–1986).

== Ab ==
- Aurora Abad, member for Batanes (1965–1969)
- Florencio Abad, member for Batanes (1987–1992, 1995–2004)
- Henedina Abad, member for Batanes (2004–2007, 2010–2017)
- Jorge Abad, member for Batanes (1949–1957, 1961–1964, 1969–1972)
- Pedro Abad Santos, member for Pampanga's 2nd district (1916–1922)
- Vicente Abad Santos, member for Central Luzon (1978–1979)
- Rufino Abadiez, member for Misamis Occidental (1943–1944)
- Eduardo Abalo, member for Capiz (1943–1944)
- Benjamin Abalos Jr., member for Mandaluyong (2004–2007)
- Jonathan Clement Abalos, member for 4Ps party-list (2022–present)
- Benny Abante, member for Manila's 6th district (2004–2010, 2019–2025, 2025–present)
- Antonio Abaya, member for Isabela's 4th district (1987–1998, 2001–2003)
- Francis Gerald Abaya, member for Cavite's 1st district (2013–2022)
- Gabino Abaya, member for Batangas's 2nd district (1928–1931)
- Jun Abaya, member for Cavite's 1st district (2004–2012)
- Plaridel Abaya, member for Cavite's 1st district (1995–2004)
- Daryl Grace Abayon, member for Aangat Tayo party-list (2007–2013)
- Harlin Abayon, member for Northern Samar's 1st district (1998–2007, 2013–2016)
- Harlin Neil Abayon III, member for Aangat Tayo party-list (2016–2019)
- Felipe Abeleda, member for Mindoro (1943–1944), and Occidental Mindoro (1953–1965)
- Jesus Abeleda, member for Occidental Mindoro (1952–1953)
- Hilario Abellana, member for Cebu's 2nd district (1934–1941)
- Rodrigo Abellanosa, member for Cebu City's 2nd district (2013–2022)
- Emilio Abello Sr., member for Region IV (1978–1984)
- Iñigo Abenis, member for Samar's 3rd district (1922–1925)
- Augurio Abeto, member for Negros Occidental's 3rd district (1949–1953)
- Ricardo Abiera, member for Negros Oriental (1984–1986)
- Crisologo Abines, member for Cebu's 2nd district (1987–1998)
- Roque Ablan Jr., member for Ilocos Norte's 1st district (1968–1972, 1987–1998, 2001–2010)
- Gregorio Abogado, member for Samar's 3rd district (1928–1931, 1949–1957)
- Domitilo Abordo, member for Iloilo's 3rd district (1957–1961)
- Gaudencio Abordo, member for Palawan (1949–1965)
- Sofronio Abrera, member for San Pablo (1943–1944)
- Felipe Abrigo, member for Samar's 3rd district (1957–1965), and Eastern Samar (1965–1972)
- Raneo Abu, member for Batangas's 2nd district (2013–2022)
- Anuar Abubakar, member for Tawi-Tawi (2004–2006)
- Alfredo Amor Abueg Jr., member for Palawan's 2nd district (1992–2001)
- Beng Abueg, member for Palawan's 2nd district (2019–2022)
- Frederick Abueg, member for Palawan's 2nd district (2013–2019)
- Teodoro Abueva, member for Bohol's 3rd district (1922–1925)
- Maria Fe Abunda, member for Eastern Samar (2019–2025)

== Ac ==
- Francisco Ashley Acedillo, member for Magdalo party-list (2013–2016)
- Emilio Acevedo, member for Capiz's 2nd district (1912–1914)
- Loreto Acharon, member for General Santos (2022–2025)
- Pedro Acharon Jr., member for South Cotabato's 1st district (2010–2019)
- Jude Acidre, member for Tingog party-list (2022–present)
- Bong Acop, member for Antipolo's 2nd district (2026–present)
- Resurreccion Acop, member for Antipolo's 2nd district (2019–2021)
- Romeo Acop, member for Antipolo's 2nd district (2010–2019, 2022–2025)
- Gil Acosta, member for Palawan's 3rd district (2016–2019)
- Gil Acosta Jr., member for Palawan's 3rd district (2019–2022, 2025–present)
- Nereus Acosta, member for Bukidnon's 1st district (1998–2007)
- Socorro Acosta, member for Bukidnon's 1st district (1987–1998)
- Maria Lourdes Acosta-Alba, member for Bukidnon's 1st district (2013–2022)
- Eric Galo Acuña, member for Pangasinan's 3rd district (1992–1998)
- Mariano Acuña, member for Capiz's 1st district (1965–1969)
- Rafael Acuña, member for Capiz's 1st district (1909–1916), and Mindanao and Sulu (1916–1919, 1922–1925)

== Ad ==
- Ronald Adamat, sectoral member (1995–1998)
- Artemio Adasa Jr., member for Zamboanga del Norte's 1st district (1987–1995)
- Homobono Adaza, member for Misamis Oriental (1984–1986)
- Marcelo Adduru, member for Cagayan's 1st district (1931–1934, 1935–1938)
- Faustino Adiarte, member for Ilocos Norte's 2nd district (1919–1922)
- Ansaruddin Alonto Adiong, member for Lanao del Sur's 1st district (2013–2022)
- Mamintal Adiong Sr., member for Lanao del Sur's 1st district (1992–2001)
- Zia Alonto Adiong, member for Lanao del Sur's 1st district (2022–present)
- Macario Adriatico, member for Mindoro (1907–1914)
- Adrian Jay Advincula, member for Cavite's 3rd district (2022–present)
- Alex Advincula, member for Cavite's 3rd district (2013–2022)

== Af ==
- Valentin Afable, member for Zambales (1938–1941, 1943–1944, 1945–1946)
- Virgilio Afable, member for Zambales (1961–1965)

== Ag ==
- Tyrone Agabas, member for Pangasinan's 6th district (2019–2022)
- Anastacio Agan, member for Batanes (1946–1949)
- Vicente Agan, member for Batanes (1925–1928, 1934–1941, 1945–1946)
- Benjamin Agarao Jr., member for Laguna's 4th district (2004–2007, 2013–2022, 2025–present)
- Jam Agarao, member for Laguna's 4th district (2022–2025)
- Aguedo Agbayani, member for Pangasinan's 1st district (1957–1972)
- Rodolfo Agbayani, member for Nueva Vizcaya (2004–2007)
- Victor Aguedo Agbayani, member for Pangasinan (1984–1986), and Pangasinan's 2nd district (2007–2010)
- Mariano Agcaoili, member for Region IV-A (1978–1984)
- Maria Lourdes Aggabao, member for Isabela's 4th district (2016–2019)
- Giorgidi Aggabao, member for Isabela's 4th district (2003–2004, 2007–2016)
- Michael Edgar Aglipay, member for Diwa party-list (2019–2022)
- Emmeline Aglipay-Villar, member for Diwa party-list (2010–2018)
- Felipe Agoncillo, member for Batangas's 1st district (1907–1909)
- Vicente Agregado, member for Batangas's 2nd district (1919–1922)
- Marcelino Aguas, member for Pampanga's 2nd district (1907–1909)
- Manuel Agudo, member for Batanes (1957–1961)
- Amancio Aguilar, member for Sorsogon's 2nd district (1916–1919)
- Filemon Aguilar, member for Las Piñas–Muntinlupa (1987–1992)
- Rodolfo Aguinaldo, member for Cagayan's 3rd district (1998–2001)
- Emiliano Aguirre, member for Mountain Province (1934–1935)
- Ramon Aguirre, member for Agusan (1943–1944)
- Alberto Aguja, member for Leyte's 5th district (1953–1961)
- Armando Aguja Jr., sectoral member (1984–1986)
- Mario Aguja, member for Akbayan party-list (2004–2007)
- Manuel Agyao, member for Kalinga (2007–2016)
- Caroline Agyao, member for Kalinga (2025–present)

== Ak ==
- Jum Jainudin Akbar, member for Basilan (2016)
- Wahab Akbar, member for Basilan (2007)

== Al ==
- Juan Alano, member for Zamboanga (1935–1941, 1943–1944, 1946–1949)
- Yusop Alano, member for Basilan (2025–present)
- Eufrosino Alba, member for Capiz's 3rd district (1919–1921)
- Gabriel Alba, member for Zambales (1911–1912, 1914–1916)
- Jose Manuel Alba, member for Bukidnon's 1st district (2022–present)
- Juliano Alba, member for Capiz's 1st district (1969–1972)
- Leopoldo Alba, member for Capiz's 2nd district (1916–1919)
- Manuel Alba, Cabinet member (1984–1986)
- Delfin Albano, member for Isabela (1957–1965)
- Pedro Albano, member for Ilocos Norte's 2nd district (1946–1949)
- Rodolfo Albano Jr., member for Isabela (1969–1972, 1984–1986), Region II (1978–1984), Isabela's 1st district (1987–1998, 2001–2004, 2010–2013), and LPGMA party-list (2019)
- Rodolfo Albano III, member for Isabela's 1st district (1998–2001, 2004–2010, 2013–2019)
- Tonypet Albano, member for Isabela's 1st district (2019–present)
- Justo Albert, member for Manila's 4th district (1961–1965)
- Jose Alberto, member for Catanduanes (1957–1972, 1984–1986), and Region V (1978–1984)
- Irvin Alcala, member for Quezon's 2nd district (2010–2013)
- Proceso Alcala, member for Quezon's 2nd district (2004–2010)
- Vicente Alcala, member for Quezon's 2nd district (2013–2019)
- Juan Alcazaren, member for Cebu's 4th district (1925–1934)
- Pastor Alcover Jr., member for ANAD party-list (2007–2013)
- Damian Aldaba, member for Region VIII (1978–1984), and Leyte (1984–1986)
- Isidoro Aldanese, member for Cebu's 4th district (1919–1925)
- Mariano Alde, member for Samar's 3rd district (1912–1916)
- Agustin Aldea, member for Capiz's 2nd district (1922–1925)
- Jose Aldeguer, member for Iloilo's 5th district (1949–1972)
- Gary Alejano, member for Magdalo party-list (2013–2019)
- Ciriaco Alfelor, member for Camarines Sur (1984–1986), and Camarines Sur's 4th district (1987–1998)
- Felix Alfelor Jr., member for Camarines Sur's 4th district (2001–2010)
- Baby Alfonso, member for Cagayan's 2nd district (2011–2019, 2022–present)
- Datu Bato Ali, member for Lanao (1943–1944)
- Isidro Aligada, sectoral member (1995–1998)
- Amadeo Alinea, member for Region III (1978–1984)
- Estanislao Alinea Jr., member for Region IV (1978–1984)
- Nicasio Aliping Jr., member for Baguio (2013–2016)
- Mariano Alisangco, member for La Union's 1st district (1931–1934)
- Quiremon Alkuino, member for Leyte's 1st district (1907–1909)
- Cipriano Allas, member for Pangasinan's 5th district (1946–1953)
- Fausto Almeida, member for La Union's 1st district (1925–1928)
- Alden Almario, member for Makati's 2nd district (2025–present)
- Cheeno Almario, member for Davao Oriental's 2nd district (2022–present)
- Joel Mayo Almario, member for Davao Oriental's 2nd district (1998–2007, 2016–2022)
- Thelma Almario, member for Davao Oriental's 2nd district (1987–1998, 2007–2016)
- Aurelio Almazan, member for Laguna's 1st district (1934–1935)
- Felipe Almazan, member for Kalinga-Apayao (1969–1972)
- Alejandro Almendras, member for Region XI (1978–1984), Davao del Sur (1984–1986), and Davao del Sur's 1st district (1992–1995)
- Alejandro Almendras Jr., member for Davao del Sur's 1st district (1995–1998)
- Jovenal Almendras, member for Cebu's 1st district (1946–1949)
- Jason Almonte, member for Misamis Occidental's 1st district (2022–present)
- Jorge Almonte, member for Misamis Occidental's 1st district (2010–2019)
- Tomas Almonte, member for Albay's 1st district (1907–1909)
- Roy Almoro, member for Laguna's 1st district (1992–1995)
- Len Alonte, member for Biñan (2016–2025)
- Alauya Alonto, member for Mindanao and Sulu (1934–1935)
- Domocao Alonto, member for Lanao (1953–1955)
- Jose Alonzo, member for Cebu's 7th district (1919–1925)
- Paulino Alonzo, member for Cagayan's 2nd district (1946–1957)
- Tomás N. Alonso, member for Cebu's 7th district (1914–1919), and Cebu's 5th district (1928–1931)
- Jose Altavas, member for Capiz's 2nd district (1907–1909, 1925–1928)
- Rafael Alunan Sr., member for Negros Occidental's 2nd district (1912–1922)
- Agustin Alvarez, member for Mindanao and Sulu (1931–1934), and Zamboanga (1943–1944)
- Antonio Alvarez, member for Palawan's 1st district (2004–2013)
- Francisco Alvarez, member for Ambos Camarines's 3rd district (1907–1909)
- Franz Alvarez, member for Palawan's 1st district (2013–2022)
- Genaro Alvarez Jr., member for Negros Occidental's 6th district (1995–2004, 2007–2010, 2019–2022)
- Heherson Alvarez, member for Isabela's 4th district (1998–2001)
- Jose Alvarez, member for Palawan's 2nd district (2022–present)
- Mercedes Alvarez, member for Negros Occidental's 6th district (2010–2019, 2022–present)
- Pantaleon Alvarez, member for Davao del Norte's 1st district (1998–2001, 2016–2025)
- Juan Alvear, member for Pangasinan's 3rd district (1907–1909)
- Manuel Alzate, member for Nueva Ecija's 1st district (1935–1941)

== Am ==
- Loreto Amante, member for Laguna's 3rd district (2022–present)
- Angelica Amante, member for Agusan del Norte's 2nd district (2004–2007, 2010–2013, 2019–2022)
- Edelmiro Amante, member for Region X (1978–1984), Agusan del Norte (1984–1986), and Agusan del Norte's 2nd district (1987–1995, 2001–2004, 2007–2010)
- Erlpe John Amante, member for Agusan del Norte's 2nd district (2013–2019)
- Felix Amante, member for Negros Occidental's 2nd district (1965–1969)
- Victor Amasa, member for Region VIII (1978–1984)
- Ernesto Amatong, member for Zamboanga del Norte's 2nd district (1987–1995)
- Ian Amatong, member for Zamboanga del Norte's 3rd district (2022–present)
- Isagani Amatong, member for Zamboanga del Norte's 3rd district (2013–2022)
- Prospero Amatong, member for Compostela Valley's 2nd district (1998–2007)
- Rommel Amatong, member for Compostela Valley's 2nd district (2007–2016)
- Ombra Amilbangsa, member for Mindanao and Sulu (1934–1935), and Sulu (1935–1938, 1943–1944, 1945–1949, 1950–1961)
- Hussin Ututalum Amin, member for Sulu's 1st district (1998–2007)
- Jesus Amparo, member for Region XII (1978–1984)
- Atanacio Ampig, member for Iloilo's 3rd district (1934–1935, 1938–1941)

== An ==
- Berthobal Ancheta Sr., member for Bukidnon's 2nd district (2001–2004)
- Pio Ancheta, member for La Union's 1st district (1922–1925, 1928–1931)
- Manuel Andaya, member for Oriental Mindoro's 2nd district (1998–2001)
- Rolando Andaya Sr., member for Camarines Sur (1984–1986), and Camarines Sur's 1st district (1987–1998)
- Rolando Andaya Jr., member for Camarines Sur's 1st district (1998–2007, 2010–2019)
- Vicente Andaya Jr., member for Capiz's 2nd district (1992–2001)
- Gregorio Andolana, member for Cotabato's 2nd district (1987–1998)
- James Ang Jr., member for Uswag Ilonggo party-list (2022–present)
- Ronald Ang, member for Ako Bicol party-list (2019)
- Bella Angara, member for Aurora (1995–2004, 2013–2019)
- Jose Angara, member for Tayabas's 1st district (1934–1938)
- Rommel T. Angara, member for Aurora (2019–present)
- Sonny Angara, member for Aurora (2004–2013)
- Cristy Angeles, member for Tarlac's 2nd district (2025–present)
- Democlito Angeles, member for Marikina (1987–1992)
- Pablo Ángeles David, member for Pampanga's 1st district (1919–1922)
- Romeo Angeles, sectoral member (1987–1992)
- Harry Angping, member for Manila's 3rd district (1998–2004)
- Maria Zenaida Angping, member for Manila's 3rd district (2007–2016)
- Francisco Aniag Jr., member for Bulacan's 1st district (1987–1992)
- Arden Anni, member for Sulu's 2nd district (1987–1992)
- Indanan Anni, member for Sulu (1969–1972)
- Gregorio Anonas, member for Zambales (1928–1934)
- Adelbert Antonino, member for South Cotabato's 1st district (1987–1992)
- Darlene Antonino Custodio, member for South Cotabato's 1st district (2001–2010)
- Luwalhati Antonino, member for South Cotabato's 1st district (1992–2001)
- Magnolia Antonino, member for La Union's 1st district (1965–1967)
- Magnolia Rosa Antonino-Nadres, member for Nueva Ecija's 4th district (2013–2019)
- Rodolfo Antonino, member for Nueva Ecija's 4th district (2004–2013)
- Michelle Antonio, member for AGBIAG party-list (2016–2019)
- Patricio Antonio, member for Cagayan's 1st district (1995–1998), and AGBIAG party-list (2010–2016)
- Roberto Antonio, sectoral member (1984–1986)
- Rufino Antonio, member for Rizal's 1st district (1961–1965)

== Ap ==
- Apolinario Apacible, member for Batangas's 1st district (1949–1963)
- Conrado Apacible, member for Batangas's 1st district (1987–1992)
- Galicano Apacible, member for Batangas's 1st district (1909–1916)
- Tomas Apacible, member for Batangas's 1st district (2010–2013)
- Segundo Apostol, member for Leyte's 3rd district (1916–1919)
- Sergio Apostol, member for Leyte's 2nd district (1992–2001, 2010–2016)
- Trinidad Apostol, member for Leyte's 2nd district (2001–2010)

== Aq ==
- Antonio Aquino, member for Quezon City's 2nd district (1987–1992)
- Baltazar Aquino, member for Region III (1978–1984)
- Benigno Aquino Sr., member for Tarlac's 2nd district (1919–1928, 1934–1938, 1945–1946), and Tarlac (1943–1944)
- Benigno Aquino III, member for Tarlac's 2nd district (1998–2007)
- Florendo Aquino, member for Baguio (1943–1944)
- Herminio Aquino, member for Tarlac's 3rd district (1987–1998)
- Honorato Aquino, member for Baguio (1984–1986), and Benguet's 1st district (1987–1992)
- Jesus Reynaldo Aquino, member for Pampanga's 3rd district (2004–2007)
- Jose Aquino, member for Agusan (1965–1969)
- Jose Aquino II, member for Agusan del Norte's 1st district (2007–2013, 2022–2025), and Butuan (2025–present)
- Rafael Aquino, member for Sorsogon's 2nd district (1969–1972)
- Sergio Aquino, member for Tarlac (1943–1944)
- Tessie Aquino-Oreta, member for Malabon–Navotas (1987–1998)

== Ar ==
- Maria Evita Arago, member for Laguna's 3rd district (2007–2013)
- Sol Aragones, member for Laguna's 3rd district (2013–2022)
- Abdulmunir Arbison, member for Sulu's 2nd district (2001–2010, 2016–2022, 2025–present)
- Munir Arbison Jr., member for Sulu's 2nd district (2022–2025), and Kapuso PM party-list (2025–present)
- Maryam Arbison, member for Sulu's 2nd district (2013–2016)
- Francisco Arca, member for Cavite (1934–1935)
- Tomas Arejola, member for Ambos Camarines's 1st district (1907–1912)
- Francisco Arellano, member for Sorsogon's 2nd district (1928–1931)
- Maria Rachel Arenas, member for Pangasinan's 3rd district (2007–2013, 2022–present)
- Rose Marie Arenas, member for Pangasinan's 3rd district (2013–2022)
- Antonio Argosino, member for Tayabas's 2nd district (1934–1935)
- George Arnaiz, member for Negros Oriental's 2nd district (2007–2016)
- Ramon Arnaldo, member for Capiz's 1st district (1938–1941, 1945–1953)
- Godofredo Arquiza, member for Senior Citizens party-list (2009–2013)
- Asencio Arrancillo, member for Iloilo's 4th district (1925–1928)
- Melecio Arranz, member for Cagayan (1943–1944)
- Amado Arrieta, member for Cebu's 6th district (1965–1969)
- Reynante Arrogancia, member for Quezon's 3rd district (2022–present)
- Dato Arroyo, member for Camarines Sur's 1st district (2007–2016), and Camarines Sur's 2nd district (2010–2016)
- Gloria Macapagal Arroyo, member for Pampanga's 2nd district (2010–2019, 2022–present)
- Iggy Arroyo, member for Negros Occidental's 5th district (2004–2012)
- Joker Arroyo, member for Makati (1992–1998), and Makati's 1st district (1998–2001)
- José María Arroyo, member for Iloilo's 1st district (1916–1919)
- Marilou Arroyo-Lesaca, member for Ang Kasangga party-list (2007–2010), and Negros Occidental's 5th district (2019–2022)
- Mikey Arroyo, member for Pampanga's 2nd district (2004–2010, 2019–2022), and AGP party-list (2010–2013)
- Jose Artadi, member for Misamis's 1st district (1919–1925), Mindanao and Sulu (1928–1930), and Misamis Oriental (1943–1944, 1945–1946)
- Bartolome Arteche, sectoral member (1987–1992)
- Pedro Arteche, member for Samar's 2nd district (1945–1946)
- Ulpiano Arzadon, member for Ilocos Norte's 2nd district (1936–1941)

== As ==
- Carlos Ascutia, member for Camarines Norte (1943–1944)
- Benjamin Asilo, member for Manila's 1st district (2007–2016)
- Dean Asistio, member for Caloocan's 3rd district (2022–present)
- Luis Asistio, member for Caloocan's 2nd district (1992–2001, 2004–2007)
- Manolito Asok, member for Siquijor (1984–1986)
- Jose Aspiras, member for La Union's 2nd district (1969–1972, 1987–1998), Region I (1978–1984), and La Union (1984–1986)
- Andres Asprer, member for La Union's 1st district (1907–1909)

== At ==
- Arjo Atayde, member for Quezon City's 1st district (2022–present)
- Hermenegildo Atienza, member for Manila's 2nd district (1946–1949), and Manila's 4th district (1949–1952)
- Lito Atienza, member for Manila (1984–1986), and Buhay party-list (2013–2022)

== Au ==
- Aris Aumentado, member for Bohol's 2nd district (2013–2022)
- Erico Aumentado, member for Bohol's 2nd district (1992–2001, 2010–2013)
- Vanvan Aumentado, member for Bohol's 2nd district (2022–present)
- Pedro Aunario, member for Mountain Province (1919–1922)

== Av ==
- Daisy Avance-Fuentes, member for South Cotabato's 2nd district (1992–2001, 2010–2013)
- Amando Avanceña, member for Iloilo's 1st district (1907–1909), and Iloilo's 4th district (1912–1914)
- José Avelino, member for Samar's 1st district (1922–1928)
- Edgar Avila, sectoral member (1992–1998)

== Ay ==
- Arlyn Ayon, member for Swerte party-list (2025–present)

== Az ==
- Benito Azanza, member for Samar's 2nd district (1909–1912)
- Pascual Azanza, member for Samar's 2nd district (1922–1928, 1936–1941)
- Felipe Azcuna, member for Zamboanga del Norte (1969–1972)
- Makairog Aznar, sectoral member (1978–1984)
