= Andaya =

Andaya is a surname. Notable people with the surname include:

- Barbara Watson Andaya (born 1943), Australian historian and author
- Mark Andaya (born 1981), Filipino basketball player
- Marissa Mercado-Andaya (1969–2020), Filipina politician
- Rolando Andaya Jr. (1969–2022), Filipino lawyer and politician
