= Legarda Elementary School =

Public elementary school in Sampaloc, Manila, Philippines

- Mababang Paaralan ng Legarda
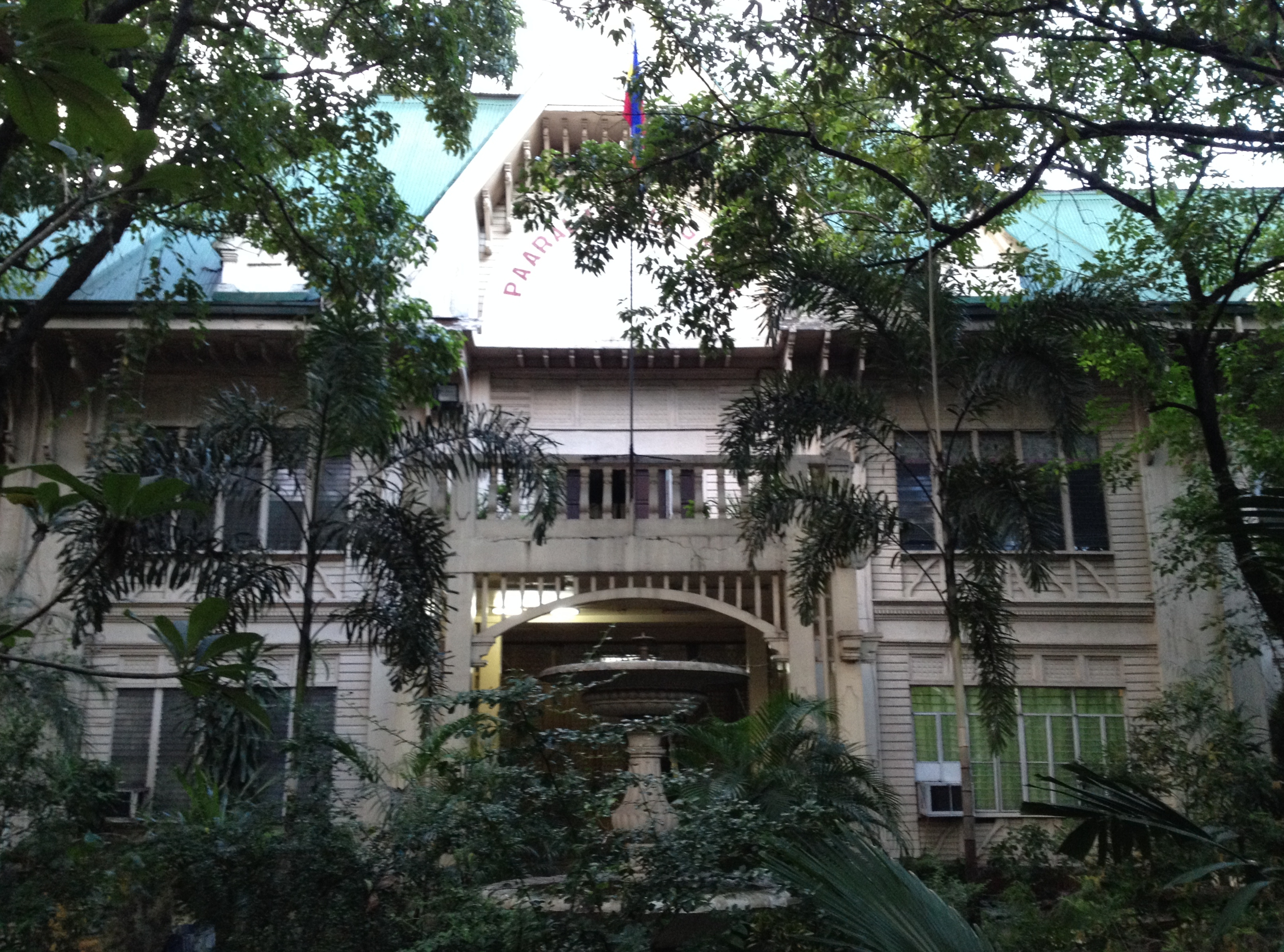

Location
- J. Fajardo St., Sampaloc, Manila; Philippines
- Coordinates: 14°36′42.91″N 120°59′56.95″E

Information
- School type: Public elementary school
- Founded: 1922
- Song: Awit ng Legarda (Song of Legarda)

The Legarda Elementary School is a public elementary school located in Sampaloc in the City of Manila. Built in 1922, the school is notable for its main school building that has managed to retain its pre-war architecture, making its building the oldest surviving campus in Manila.

== History ==
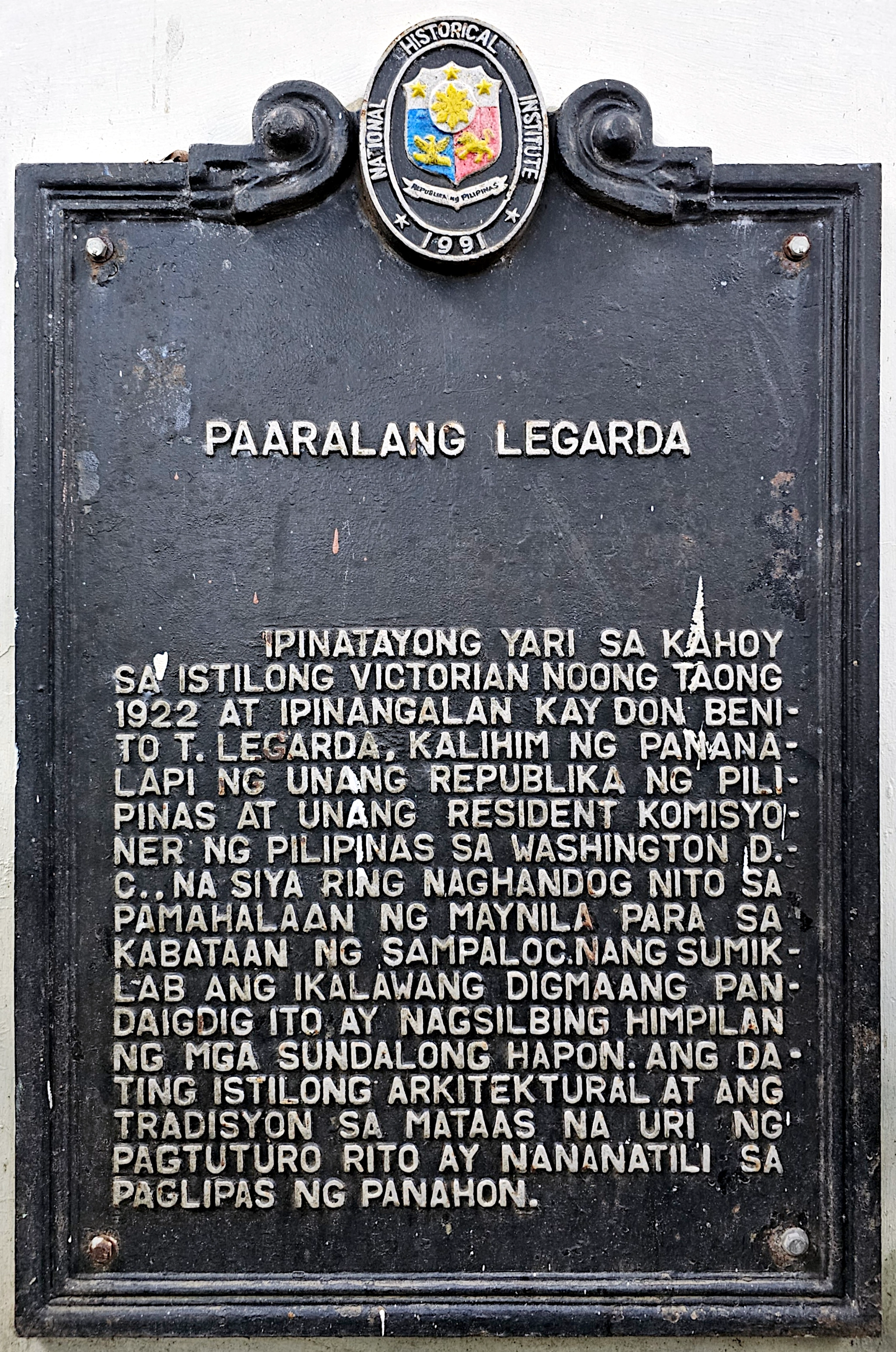
National historical marker installed in 1991

The school was built on the land that was donated by the heirs of Benito Legarda, an eminent legislator and cabinet member of the First Philippine Republic who later became the first Resident Commissioner of the Philippines during the American colonial period. It was in his honor that the school that the school was named after.

Andres Luna de San Pedro, the architect son of painter Juan Luna, designed the school's main building. It became a prominent landmark in the area with its unique Victorian style of architecture which evokes a sense of grandeur.

The school's first principal was Andrea Vitan Arce, a renowned educator and writer. The school also received an early distinction for being a model school in 1924.

During the Japanese Occupation in World War II, the Japanese forces used the school as barracks. Having survived the war, it was subsequently liberated by the Americans during the Battle of Manila, after which it became the headquarters of the U.S. 1st Cavalry Division as well as being the 29th Evacuation Hospital for wounded American soldiers. The Philippine Army also made the school its headquarters for a brief time.

Additional school buildings were built in the school grounds to accommodate a growing student population but the original structure has been preserved as a landmark heritage structured cited by the Department of Education and the National Historical Commission of the Philippines.

== Notable alumni ==
- Isagani A. Cruz - former Supreme Court Associate Justice
- Washington SyCip - accountant and co-founder of the auditing firm SyCip Gorres Velayo & Co.
- Robert Arevalo - award winning actor
- Pacita Abad - artist

== Gallery ==
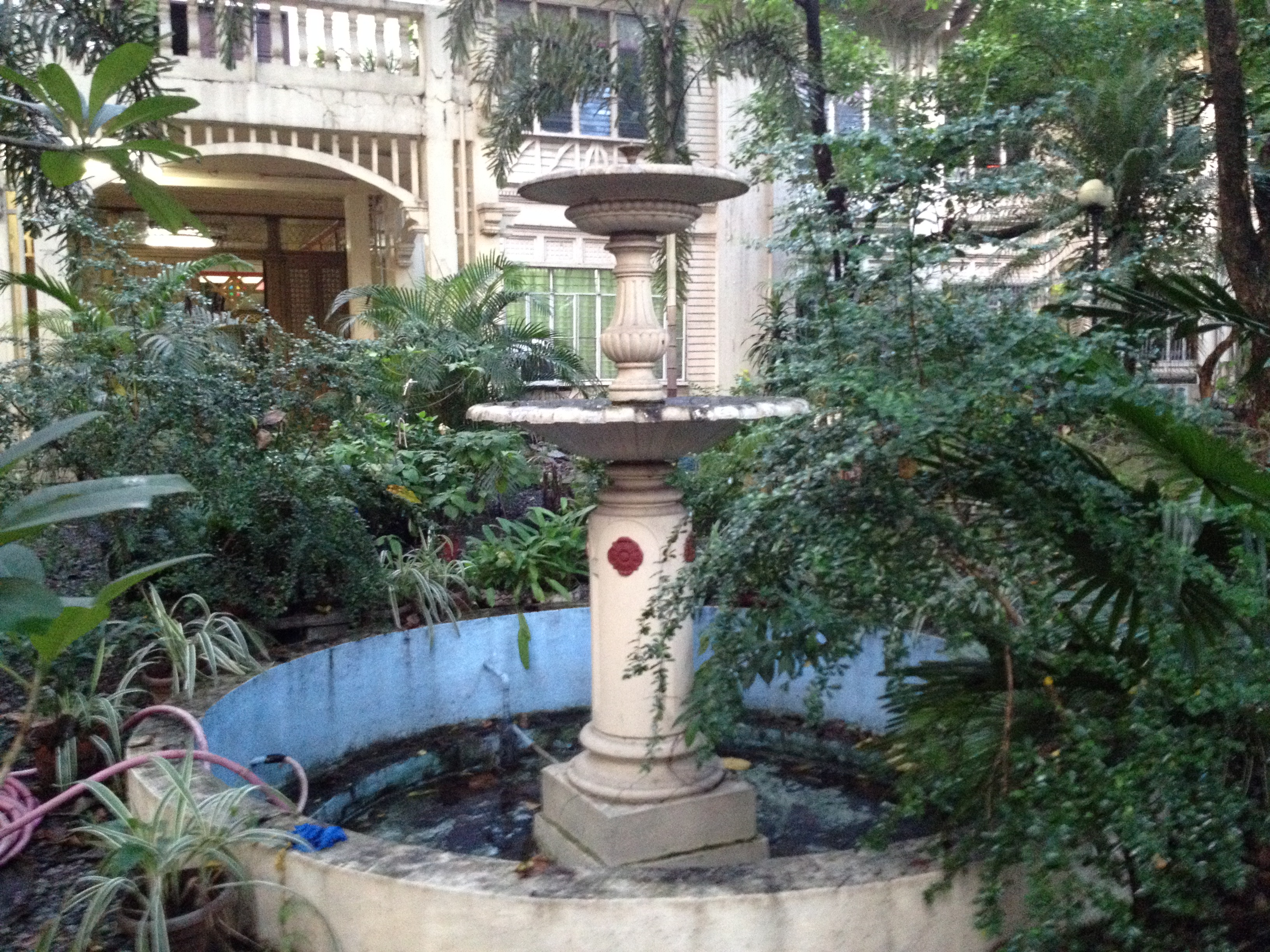
fountain fronting the building facade

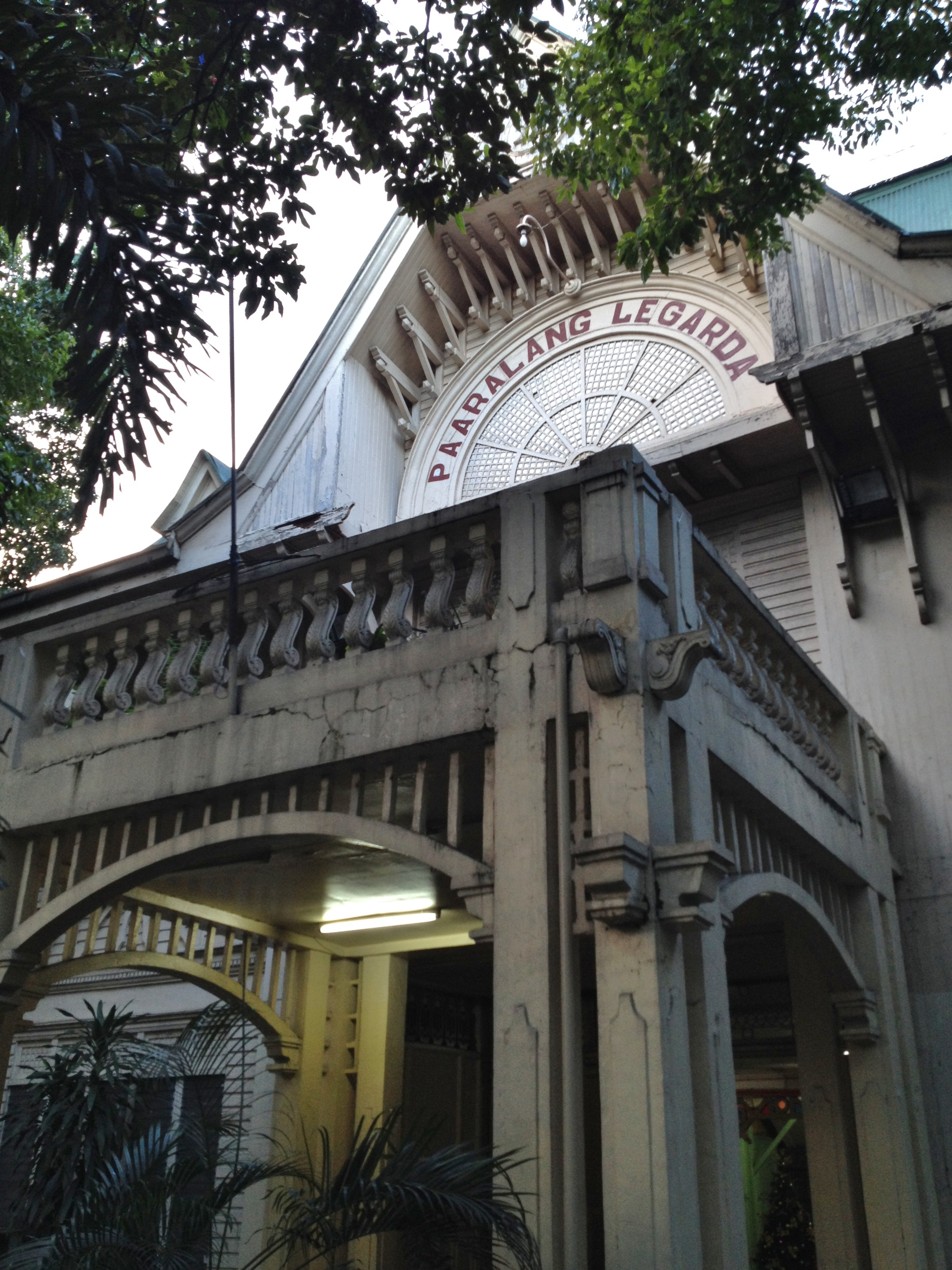

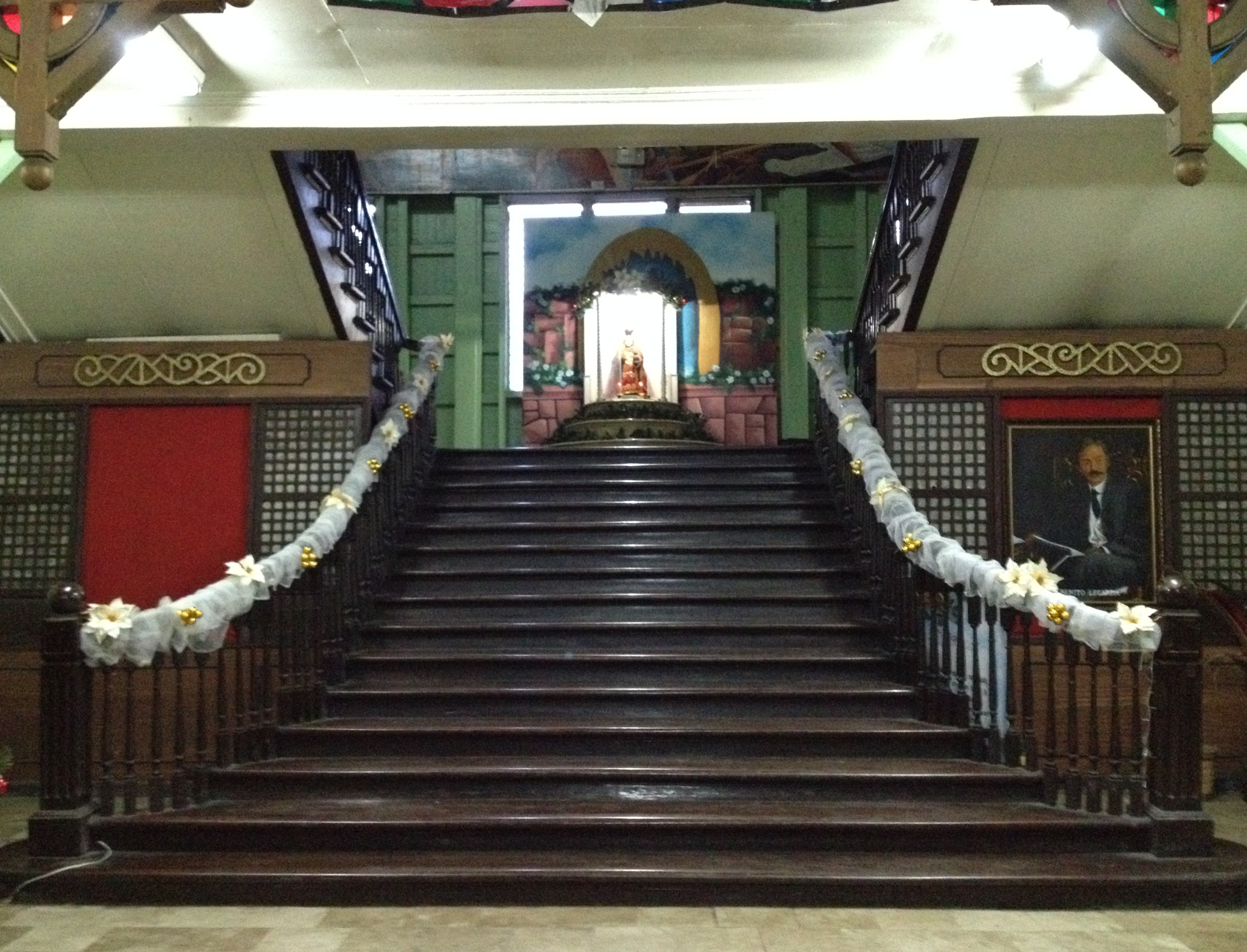
grand staircase in the building interior

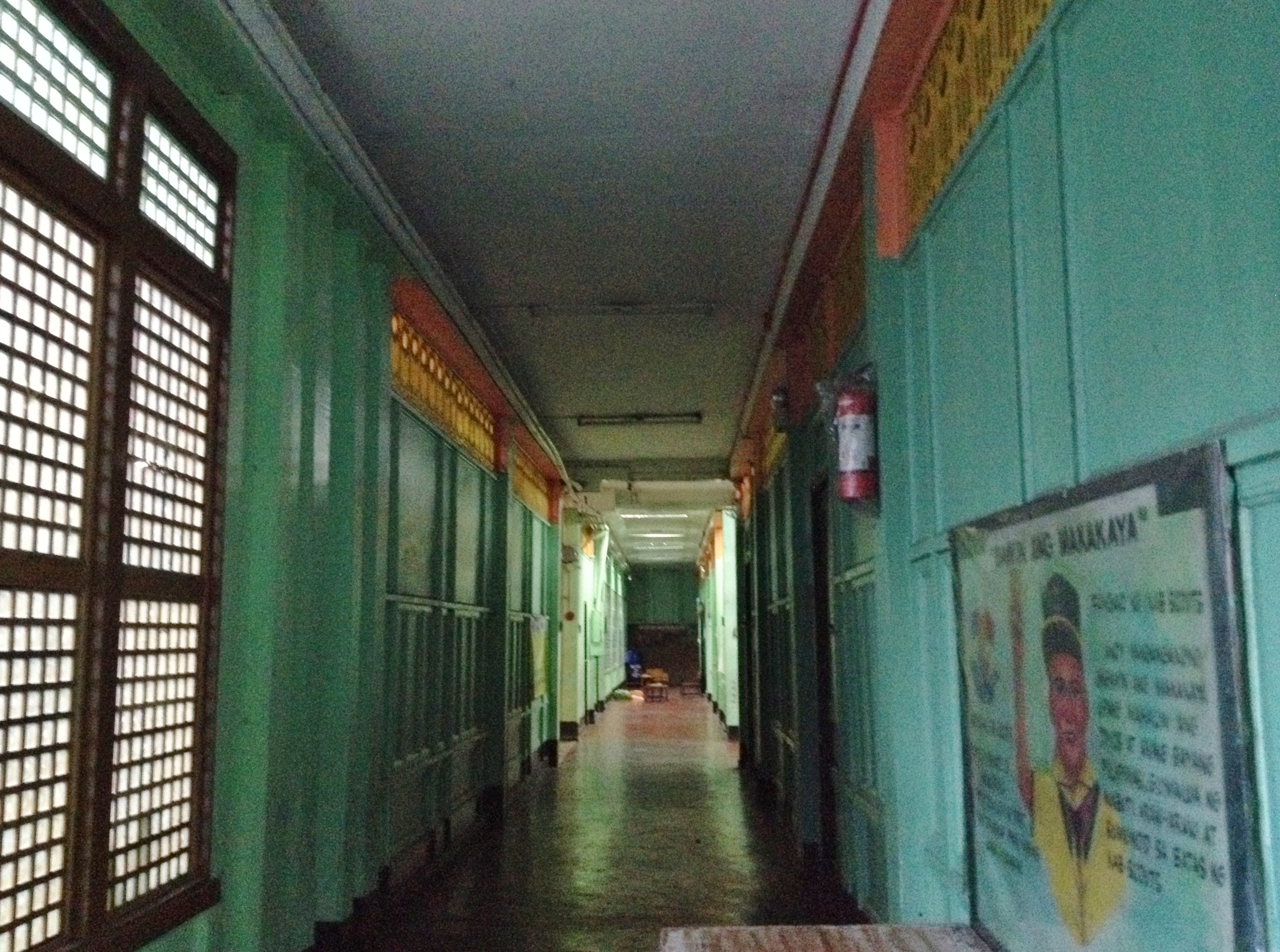
the school building's hallway

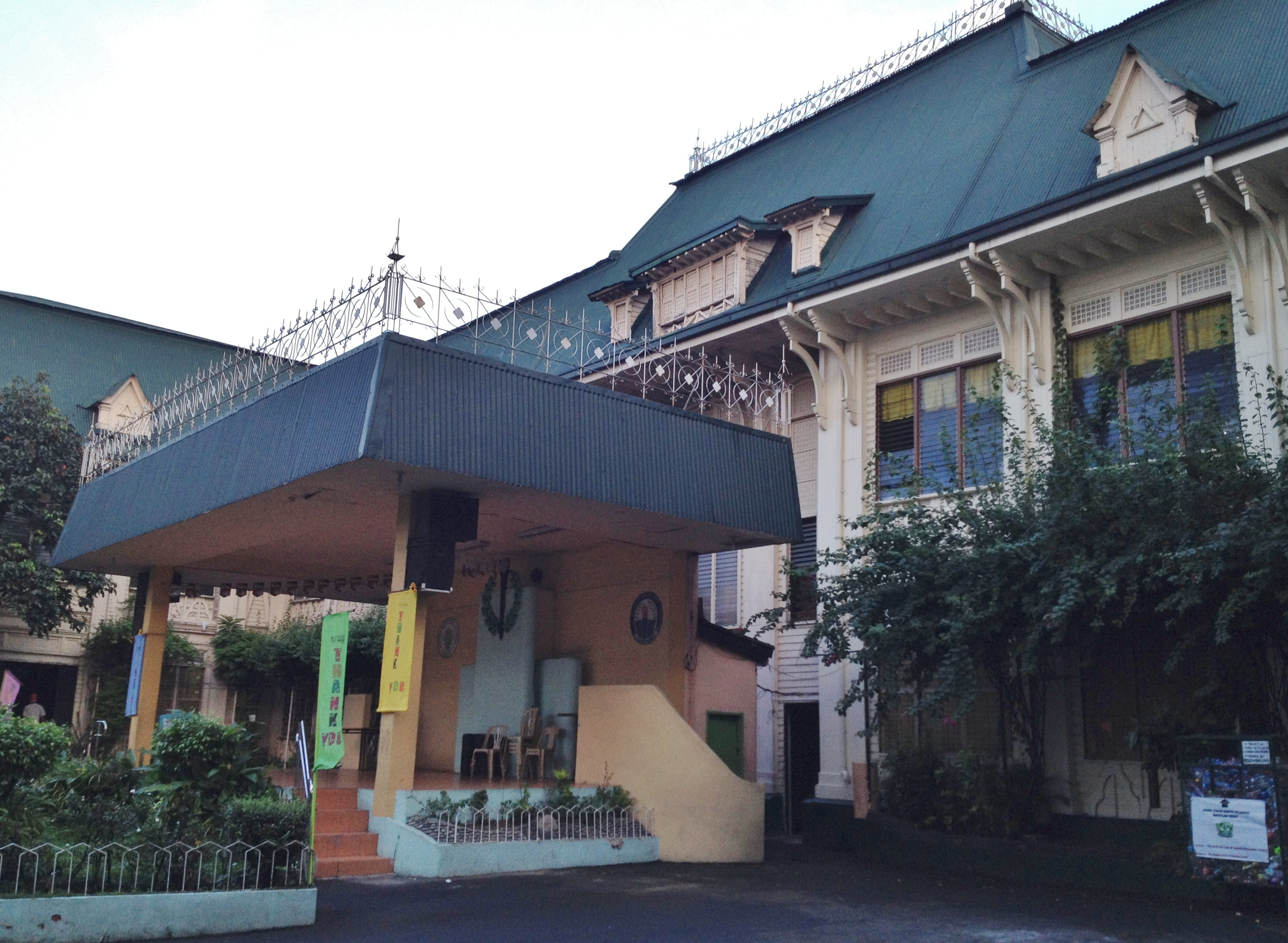
view of the school building from the open area in the middle of the school complex
