= Henedina Abad =

Filipino politician

Henedina R. Abad

Member of the Philippine House of Representatives from Batanes
- In office June 30, 2010 – October 8, 2017
- Preceded by: Carlo Oliver D. Diasnes
- Succeeded by: Ciriaco Gato
- In office June 30, 2004 – June 30, 2007
- Preceded by: Florencio B. Abad
- Succeeded by: Carlo Oliver D. Diasnes

Personal details
- Born: Henedina Razon; January 26, 1955 Sampaloc, Manila
- Died: October 8, 2017 (aged 62) Quezon City, Philippines
- Party: Liberal (2004–2017)
- Spouse: Florencio Abad
- Relations: Pacita Abad (Sister-in-law)
- Children: Julia Andrea Abad; Pio Emmanuel Abad; Luis Andres Abad; Cecilia Paz Abad
- Education: Miriam College; Harvard University
- Occupation: Lawyer, public servant
- Profession: Law

Henedina Razon-Abad (26 January 1955 – 8 October 2017) was a Filipina politician who last served as a member of the House of Representatives for Batanes from 2004 to 2007 and from 2010 until her death in 2017.

== Early life ==
Born in 1955, she attended Miriam College (then Maryknoll College) and later graduated from the John F. Kennedy School of Government at Harvard University. After completing her education, Abad worked with several non-governmental organizations. She also served as dean of the Ateneo de Manila University School of Government.

== Career ==
Abad was a member of the House of Representatives from 2004 to 2007 and again between 2010 and 2017, representing the Liberal Party and the legislative district of Batanes. She also served as the chairperson of the House Committee on Government Reorganization until she was removed in March 2017 after failing to vote on the proposed death penalty bill for drug-related crimes.

== Personal life ==
She was married to Florencio Abad, with whom she had four children.

== Death ==
Abad died on 8 October 2017 at the age of 62 due to cancer.
