= Pacita Abad =

Philippine-born Ivatan and American painter (born 1946)

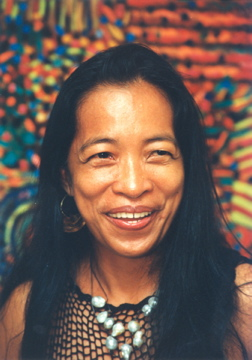
- Abad in 1990
- Born: Pacita Barsana Abad; October 5, 1946; Basco, Batanes, Philippines
- Died: December 7, 2004 (aged 58); Singapore
- Resting place: Basco, Batanes, Philippines
- Citizenship: Philippines (1946-1994); United States (1994-2004)
- Education: University of the Philippines Diliman (BA); Lone Mountain College (MA), Corcoran College of Art and Design (attended); Art Students League of New York (attended)
- Spouses: George Kleinmen (divorced); Jack Garrity
- Relatives: Florencio Abad (brother)
- Website: www.pacitaabad.com

Pacita Barsana Abad (October 5, 1946 – December 7, 2004) was a Filipino-American Ivatan visual artist. She worked in mixed media, integrating fiber art with painting; in particular she created mixed-media canvases using trapunto quilting as well as painting. Her work is characterized by vibrant color. Over more than 30 years, she exhibited her work in over 200 museums, galleries and other venues around the world, including 75 solo shows. Abad's work is now in public, corporate and private art collections in over 70 countries.

== Early life and education ==
Abad was born in Basco, Batanes, on October 5, 1946, the fifth of thirteen children. From 1949 to 1972, her father, Jorge Abad, represented the lone district of Batanes in the Congress of the Philippines for a total of five nonconsecutive terms. Her mother, Aurora Abad, served for one term (1966 to 1969) in the same elected position after Jorge Abad was appointed secretary of public works and highways by President Diosdado Macapagal. The Abad family moved from Batanes to Manila at the end of Jorge Abad's first term, returning temporarily when he was campaigning for reelection. In Manila, Pacita Abad attended Legarda Elementary School and Ramon Magsaysay High School.

She graduated from the University of the Philippines Diliman with a Bachelor of Arts in political science in 1968. The following year, she began graduate studies in law at the same institution. During that time, she also began organizing student demonstrations protesting brutal tactics employed in the 1969 Philippine general election, including those used in Batanes, where her father was running for another term. Following a demonstration near Malacañang, Abad and several of her fellow student demonstrators met with President Ferdinand Marcos, drawing national media attention to their protest.

Abad's father successfully protested his 1969 election defeat to the Commission on Elections and the Supreme Court of the Philippines, and the family home in Manila became a target of violence, including once being shot at. Although no one was harmed, Abad's parents encouraged her to leave the country and continue her law studies in Spain. In 1970, on the way to Madrid, she visited an aunt in San Francisco and decided to stay in the United States instead.

While working as a secretary for a foreign aid foundation and as a home seamstress, Abad started a graduate program in Asian history at Lone Mountain College. In 1973 she earned a master's degree with a thesis titled "The Role of Emilio Aguinaldo in the Acquisition of the Philippines by the United States from Spain: 1898". She was offered a scholarship to attend the Boalt Law School at the University of California, Berkeley. However, she deferred her enrollment after meeting Stanford University graduate student Jack Garrity. The two traveled across Asia for a year, including a two-month stay in the Philippines. Upon returning to California, Abad relinquished her law school scholarship and took up painting.

Abad and Garrity later moved to Washington, D.C. and then to New York City, where Abad, until then self-taught, took painting classes at the Art Students League of New York and the Corcoran School of Art. At the Art Students League, Abad studied still life and figurative art under John Heliker and Robert Beverly Hale.

== Career ==
From 1978 to 1980, Abad traveled with Garrity as his work brought him to Bangladesh, Sudan, and Thailand. During their travels, Abad learned about Indigenous art techniques and traditions, as well as visiting refugee camps, the experiences later informing her work as an artist.

In Thailand, her attention was drawn to the refugee crisis along the Cambodia–Thailand border following the outbreak of the Cambodian-Vietnamese War. During several trips to the refugee camps at the border assisting in relief work, she spent time with the refugees, journalists, and relief administrators, and began to draw sketches and take photographs. Towards the end of 1979, Abad was painting based on the material she gathered and, by April 1980, she exhibited the 24-painting series Portraits of Kampuchea, also known as the Cambodian Refugee series, at the Bhirasri Institute of Modern Art in Bangkok. The exhibit did not include one of her most notable works, Flight to Freedom (1980), which was not yet complete.

From 1980 to 1982, Abad lived in Boston while Garrity attended a two-year graduate program at Boston University. Working at the Art Institute of Boston, she joined a weekly meetup of women artists and with assistance from fabric artiost Barbara Newman, developed her trapunto painting technique. In 1981 she created African Mephisto, the first painting in her Masks and Spirits series.

Filipina: A racial identity crisis (1990); acrylic, handwoven cloth, dyed yarn, beads, gold thread on stitched and padded canvas

In 1982, the couple moved to Manila, where Garrity worked for the Asian Development Bank and Abad held two major solo exhibits: Pacita Abad: A Philippine Painter Looks at the World (1984) and Pacita Abad: Paintings of People and Landscapes of Batanes (1985). (One of the paintings from the second exhibit, an expressionist oil painting called Sapuno, was later lost; it resurfaced in a private collection in 2024.)

In 1986, Abad and Garrity moved back to Washington, D.C. for his work at the World Bank; that year she co-founded the Philippine Arts, Letters, and Media Council in Washington. She was awarded three residencies at the Rutgers Center for Innovative Print and Paper in New Brunswick, New Jersey, the first in 1990, and also two residencies at Pyramid Atlantic Art Center in Hyattsville, Maryland, in 1991. Her Immigrant Experience series was begun after she received a fellowship from the Virginia Center for the Creative Arts in 1994. In 1994–95, she had a solo exhibition at the National Museum of Women in the Arts, Pacita Abad: Artists + Community, and during this period she also participated in multiple group exhibitions in addition to a joint exhibition in Manila with Paz Abad Santos in 1995, Thinking Big. In 1996, she was selected for the Art in Embassies Program and six of her trapunto paintings were hung in United States embassies in Africa and Asia. She also created costumes for several plays.

Abad and Garrity moved in 1993 to Jakarta, where Garrity worked for Gajah Tunggal Group, and in 2000 to Singapore. In 2001, they built a studio and residence on a clifftop site in Batanes, which they called Fundacion Pacita. Also in 2001, she was an artist-in-residence at Lindshammar Glassworks in Lindshammar, Sweden, and was awarded a residency at the Southwest School of Art and Craft in San Antonio, Texas. In 2003, she was one of the first artists selected for a residency at the Singapore Tyler Print Institute founded by Kenneth Tyler.

== Works ==
Ati-Atihan (1983); acrylic on stitched and padded canvas

Abad created over 4,500 artworks. Her early paintings were primarily figurative socio-political works of people and primitive masks. She did a series of large-scale paintings of underwater scenes, tropical flowers, and animal wildlife. Her most extensive body of work is her later colorful abstract work, made up of many large-scale canvases and a number of small collages, on a range of materials from canvas and paper to barkcloth, metal, ceramic, and glass. Her work is characterized by vibrant color. In 1991, she painted a self-portrait in front of San Francisco landmarks, If My Friends Could See Me Now; she is wearing a red beret, the Transamerica Pyramid is royal blue, and other buildings are scarlet and violet, with Lombard Street embroidered in gold thread.

Abad's characteristic trapunto paintings integrate stitched and stuffed fabric with painting to produce a sculptural effect. She also incorporated materials including cloth, mirrors, beads, shells, and buttons into the surface of her paintings. In 1988 she taught classes on trapunto painting and on wearable art at the Smithsonian Institution.

Her series of six trapunto paintings, Masks from Six Continents, hung as a mural at the Metro Center station in Washington, DC, from 1990 to 1993. Other series included the Cambodian Refugee series (1979–80), a series inspired by peoples of highland Papua New Guinea (begun in 1982), the Asian Abstractions series of trapunto paintings featuring repeating patterns of rice stalks (begun in 1985), Immigrant Experience (begun in 1994), and a series of depictions of Indonesian wayang puppets that grew to encompass more than 100 paintings and led to a 2000 commission from Kedaung Ceramics for a hand-painted limited-edition dinnerware set. Her final series of large trapunto paintings, Endless Blues, was created and exhibited in Singapore in 2002. In addition to the Cambodian Refugee and Immigrant Experience series, Abad's political art included Death of Ninoy (1983, painted immediately after the assassination of Benigno Aquino Jr), the trapunto painting Marcos and His Cronies (1985–95), Caught at the Border (1991), Korean Shopkeepers (1992, in response to the 1992 Los Angeles riots), Haitians Waiting (1992), L.A. Liberty (1992), Contemplating Flor (1995, in response to the sentencing of Flor Contemplacion), Filipinas in Hong Kong (1995), The Sky Is Falling, the Sky Is Falling (1998), and in collaboration with New York women artists, three 2001 murals commemorating the September 11 attacks as part of the 9/11 Phoenix Project.

A few months before her death in 2004, Abad painted the 55-meter long Alkaff Bridge in Singapore, covering it with 2,350 circles in 55 colors; it is now known as Singapore ArtBridge.

== Exhibitions ==
=== Solo ===
- Pacita Abad: A Philippine Painter Looks at the World, curated by Arturo Luz, Museum of Philippine Art, Manila, 1984
- Pacita Abad: Paintings of People and Landscapes of Batanes, curated by Ray Albano, Cultural Center of the Philippines, 1985
- Ten "political expressions", Pinaglabanan Galleries, Manila, 1985
- Assaulting the Deep Sea, installation, Ayala Museum, Makati, Philippines, 1986
- Pacita Abad: Artists + Community, curated by Angela Adams, National Museum of Women in the Arts, Washington, DC, 1994–95
- Circles in My Mind, Cultural Center of the Philippines, 2004

=== Joint and group ===
- 2nd Havana Biennial, 1986
- International Art Show for the End of World Hunger, traveling exhibition, 1987–91
- Olympiad of Art, National Museum of Modern and Contemporary Art, Korea, 1988
- 3rd Havana Biennial, 1989
- Women's Spirit, Bomani Gallery, San Francisco, with Hung Liu, Amalia Mesa-Bains, Howardena Pindell, and Joyce J. Scott, 1993
- Asia/America: Identities in Contemporary Asian American Art, touring exhibition, 1993
- Beyond the Borders: Art by Recent Immigrants, The Bronx, New York, 1993
- Touch: Beyond the Visual, Hand Workshop, Richmond, Virginia, 1993
- Thinking Big, curated by Cora Alvina, Metropolitan Museum of Manila, with Paz Abad Santos, 1995
- Memories of Overdevelopment: Philippine Diaspora in Contemporary Art, University of California, Irvine, 1996
- Bayan, centennial celebration of Philippine independence curated by Cora Alvina, Metropolitan Museum of Manila, 1998
- At Home and Abroad: 20 Contemporary Filipino Artists, Asian Art Museum, San Francisco, Contemporary Arts Museum Houston, Metropolitan Museum of Manila, 1998

== Personal life and death ==
In 1971, shortly after moving to San Francisco, Abad met and married artist George Kleiman. Though they separated shortly after, Abad credited Kleiman for introducing her to the art world.

In 1973, while at a regional World Affairs Conference in Monterey, California, Abad met Jack Garrity, a graduate student in international finance at Stanford University. After traveling across Asia for a year, the two remained together for the remainder of Abad's life. Garrity's work as a development economist caused them to travel to more than 60 countries.

Abad was naturalized as a citizen of the United States in 1994.

Abad was diagnosed in late 2001 with lung cancer and died in Singapore on December 7, 2004. She is buried in Batanes, next to her home studio.

== Legacy ==
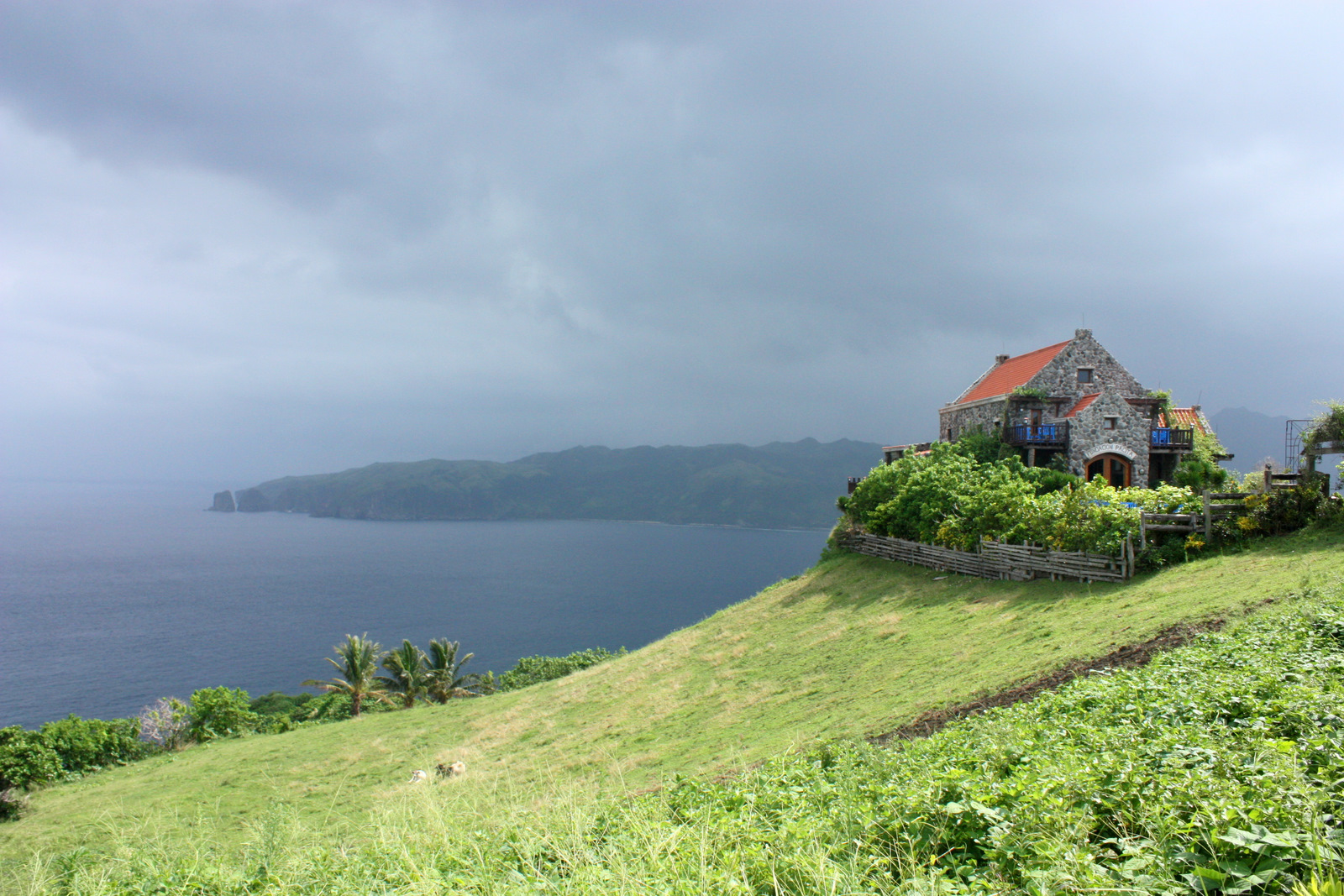
Fundacion Pacita, Abad's home and studio in Batanes

Since her death, Abad's works have often been displayed in galleries and museums in the Philippines during the annual Philippine Arts Month and other art festivals.

In 2019, the Tate Modern in London exhibited Abad's quilted canvas works "Bacongo III-IV" (1986) and "European Mask" (1990). In the same year, trapunto paintings by Abad were shown at Frieze London.

In 2023, the first major retrospective of Abad's work was held. The exhibition opened at the Walker Art Center in Minneapolis, curated by Jack Garrity, and traveled to the San Francisco Museum of Modern Art, followed by MoMA PS1 in New York City, and then the Art Gallery of Ontario in Toronto. As of 2024, it is the largest museum exhibit in the United States devoted to an Asian American female artist. An exhibition of her works titled Colors of My Dream was also presented by the Tina Kim Gallery in New York City in 2023. Works by Abad have since been exhibited in the Guggenheim Abu Dhabi and at the 60th Venice Biennale, among others.

On July 31, 2020, Abad was commemorated with a Google Doodle.

Her work was included in the exhibition Making Their Mark: Works from the Shah Garg Collection at the Berkeley Art Museum and Pacific Film Archive (BAMPFA).

== Awards ==
Abad was the first woman to receive the Outstanding Young Men of the Philippines Arts award, in 1984. In 1990 she won the Washington, DC, Metro Art Award. In 1995 she received the Excellence 2000 Award for the Arts of the US Pan Asian American Chamber of Commerce. In 2000, in Manila, she received the Pamana ng Pilipino Award for outstanding achievement in the arts.

== See also ==
- Shaped canvas
- Filipino women artists
- Arts in the Philippines

== Further information ==
- Kavery Kaul (director); Asian Women United (producer) (1994). Pacita Abad: Wild at Art (documentary). CBS television.
- Findlay-Brown, Ian (1996). Pacita Abad: Exploring the Spirit. National Gallery of Indonesia. ISBN 978-979-95029-0-2.
- Abad, Pacita (1998). Guillermo, Alice (ed.). Abstract Emotions. Indonesia: Museum Nasional. ISBN 978-979-95424-0-3.
- Abad, Pacita (1999). Bennett, James T. (ed.). Pacita Abad: Door to Life. Pacita Abad. ISBN 978-979-95029-1-9.
- Abad, Pacita (2001). Lin, Tay Swee (ed.). Pacita Abad: The Sky is the Limit. Pacita Abad. ISBN 978-981-04-3407-6.
- Abad, Pacita (2004). Findlay-Brown, Ian; Defeo, Ruben (eds.). Obsession. Pacita Abad. ISBN 978-981-05-1549-2.
