= Edilberto de Jesus =

47th Secretary of Education
- In office September 16, 2002 – August 2004
- President: Gloria Macapagal Arroyo
- Preceded by: Raul Roco
- Succeeded by: Florencio Abad

Personal details
- Born: Edilberto Caños de Jesus
- Education: Ateneo de Manila University (AB); Yale University (MPhil, PhD)
- Occupation: Politician, educator

Edilberto C. de Jesus is the incumbent President of the Asian Institute of Management in Makati, Philippines. He was appointed Secretary of Education on 16 September 2002 by President Gloria Macapagal Arroyo. to replace Sec. Raul Roco, who earlier resigned the cabinet post.

== Education ==
- A.B., Ateneo de Manila University
- M.Phil., Yale University
- Ph.D., Yale University
- Doctor of Humanities, Honoris Causa, Ateneo de Manila University
- Doctor of Humanities, Honoris Causa, Xavier University
- Doctor of Humanities, Honoris Causa, Far Eastern University

== Previous positions ==
- President, University of the Cordilleras, Baguio, 2008
- Secretariat Director, Southeast Asian Ministers of Education Organization, 2005-2007
- President, Far Eastern University, Manila, 1995-2002
- Associate Dean and chairman, AIM Policy Forum, Asian Institute of Management, 1994-1995
- Associate Dean, Enterprise Project Research, Asian Institute of Management, 1992-1993
- Presidential Adviser on Rural Development, Office of the President, 1988-1992
- Deputy Commissioner, Presidential Office of the Peace Commission, 1987-1992
- Chair, Rural Development Management Program, Asian Institute of Management, 1986-1987
- Faculty, Rural Development Management Program, Asian Institute of Management, 1980-1986

== Select affiliations ==
- Trustee, Ateneo de Manila University, 1991-2002
- Director, Centro Escolar University, 2006-2008
- Columnist, Manila Bulletin, 2006-2009
- Director, Manila Hotel, 2004-2006
- Chairman, Institute of Environmental Sciences for Social Change, 2000-2002
- President, Philippine Association of Colleges and Universities, 2002
- Trustee, Coordinating Council for Private Educational Associations, 1996-2002
- Trustee, Council for Security Cooperation in the Asia-Pacific
- Trustee, National Museum
- Trustee, The International Center for Innovation, Transformation and Excellence in Governance (INCITEGov)
- Trustee, Foundation for Liberty and Prosperity
- President, Board of Trustees, FEU Public Policy Foundation, Inc.

Preceded by Raul Roco	Secretary of Education; 2002-04	Succeeded by Florencio Abad
