= Jorge Abad =

Filipino politician (1912–1978)

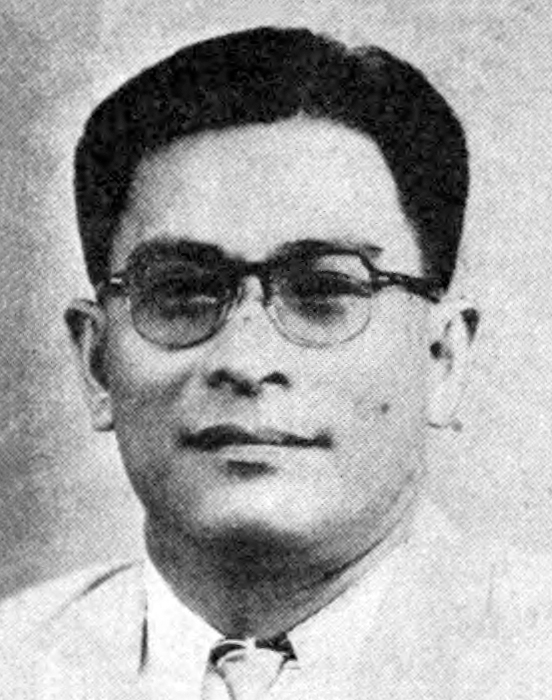
- Abad in the 3rd Congress

Secretary of Public Works, Transportation and Communications
- In office 1964–1965
- Appointed by: Diosdado Macapagal
- Preceded by: Brigido Valencia
- Succeeded by: Antonio Raquiza

Member of the Philippine House of Representatives for Batanes's at-large district
- In office April 17, 1970 – January 17, 1973
- Preceded by: Rufino Antonio Jr.
- Succeeded by: District abolished (seat next held by Fernando Faberes in 1984)
- In office December 30, 1961 – June 22, 1964
- Preceded by: Manuel Agudo
- Succeeded by: Aurora Abad
- In office December 30, 1949 – December 30, 1957
- Preceded by: Anastacio Agan
- Succeeded by: Manuel Agudo

Personal details
- Born: Jorge Abela Abad; February 10, 1912 Basco, Batanes, Philippine Islands
- Died: October 19, 1978 (aged 66)
- Party: Liberal (1949–1979)
- Other political affiliations: Independent (until 1949)
- Spouse: Aurora Abad (m. 1937; died 1991)
- Children: 13, including Florencio and Pacita

Jorge Abela Abad (February 10, 1912 – October 19, 1978) was a Filipino civil engineer and politician who served as a member of the Philippine House of Representatives for Batanes's at-large congressional district from 1949 to 1957, 1961 to 1964, and 1970 to 1973. A member of the Liberal Party, he served as secretary of public works, transportation and communications from 1964 to 1965.

== Early life and education ==
Abad was born on February 10, 1912, in Basco, Batanes, to Juan Abad and Martina Abela. He earned a bachelor's degree in civil engineering and later passed the board examination with a perfect score in mathematics.

== Career ==
Abad worked as a civil engineer in the Bureau of Public Works and later resigned his post as district engineer to run in the 1949 elections for the seat representing Batanes's at-large district in the House of Representatives as an independent. He won, later joined the Liberal Party, and was reelected in 1953. He lost in the 1957 election to Nacionalista candidate Manuel Agudo, but successfully regained the seat in 1961.

Abad was appointed secretary of public works, transportation and communications by President Diosdado Macapagal in June 1964 and resigned his congressional seat. He was succeeded by his wife Aurora after she was elected in 1965. He sought another term as representative in 1969 but lost to independent candidate Rufino Antonio Jr. Antonio's election was later annulled by the Supreme Court in April 1970, after an electoral protest known as Antonio v. COMELEC led to Abad's proclamation as the winning candidate. His term was cut short by the imposition of martial law in 1972.

== Personal life ==
He married Aurora Abad on June 1, 1937, with whom he had 13 children, including Florencio Abad, who later served as budget and management secretary in the administration of Benigno Aquino III, and international painter and first woman TOYM awardee, Pacita Abad.

Abad died on October 19, 1978.

== Legacy ==
The Jorge Abad Airport, formerly known as the Itbayat Airport, was renamed in his honor in 2017.

== Electoral history ==
Electoral history of Jorge Abad
Year	Office	Party	Votes received				Result
Year	Office	Party	Total	%	P.	Swing	Result
1949	Representative (Batanes)	Independent	—N/a	—N/a	1st	—N/a	Won
1953	Representative (Batanes)	Liberal	—N/a	—N/a	1st	—N/a	Won
1957	Representative (Batanes)	Liberal	975	27.79%	2nd	—N/a	Lost
1961	Representative (Batanes)	Liberal	1,216	31.97%	1st	+4.18	Won
1969	Representative (Batanes)	Liberal	709	26.76%	2nd	−5.21	Won (Note: The election of the first placer, Rufino Antonio Jr., was annulled by the Supreme Court following an electoral protest, after which Abad was proclaimed the winner of the 1969 elections.)

Political offices
Preceded by Brigido Valencia	Secretary of Public Works, Transportation and Communications; 1964–1965	Succeeded by Antonio Raquiza
House of Representatives of the Philippines
Preceded by Rufino Antonio Jr.	Member of the Philippine House of Representatives for Batanes's at-large district 1970–1973	Vacant Martial law and adoption of the 1973 Constitution Title next held by Fernando Faberes (in the Batasang Pambansa)
Preceded by Manuel Agudo	Member of the Philippine House of Representatives for Batanes's at-large district 1961–1964	Succeeded by Aurora Abad
Preceded by Anastacio Agan	Member of the Philippine House of Representatives for Batanes's at-large district 1949–1957	Succeeded by Manuel Agudo
