= Hori Horibata =

Filipino politician of Japanese descent

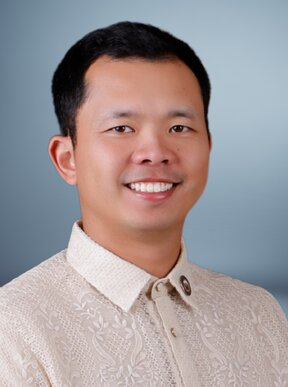
- Official portrait, 2025

Member of the Philippine House of Representatives for Camarines Sur's 1st District
- Incumbent
- Assumed office June 30, 2022
- Preceded by: Marissa Mercado-Andaya

Personal details
- Born: Tsuyoshi Anthony Glinoga Horibata; June 5, 1993 (age 33) Naga, Camarines Sur, Philippines
- Party: NUP (2024–present)
- Other political affiliations: PDP (2021–2024)
- Spouse: Franchesca Imperial (m. 2024)
- Children: 1
- Parent(s): Takeshi Horibata; Benchie Glinoga
- Education: Binghamton University (BEc)
- Occupation: Politician, Baseball Player
- Baseball career
- Pitcher
- Bats: Right Throws: Right

Teams
- Binghamton Bearcats (2013–2016)

Tsuyoshi Anthony Glinoga Horibata (堀端 津善・アンソニー・グリノーガ, Horibata Tsuyoshi Ansonī Gurinōga) (born June 5, 1993), also known as Hori Horibata, is a Filipino politician and former baseball player. He currently serves as a member of the Philippine House of Representatives from Camarines Sur's 1st District, a position he has held since 2022. Prior to his political career, Horibata was a standout baseball player, representing the Philippines in the Big League Baseball World Series in 2011 and playing for the Binghamton Bearcats in the NCAA Division I from 2013 to 2016.

== Early life and education ==
Tsuyoshi Anthony Glinoga Horibata was born on June 5, 1993, in Naga, Camarines Sur, Philippines, to Takeshi Horibata, a Japanese national, and Benchie Glinoga, a Filipina. He grew up in a multicultural household, which influenced his perspectives on community and public service. Horibata attended local schools in Naga before moving to the United States for higher education. He graduated from Binghamton University with a Bachelor's degree in Economics.

== Baseball career ==
Horibata began his baseball career as a pitcher, representing the Philippines in the 2011 Big League World Series. His performance earned him recognition and a scholarship to play for the Binghamton Bearcats in the NCAA Division I. During his collegiate career (2013–2016), he was known for his strong pitching and leadership on the field.

== Political career ==
Horibata entered politics in 2021, joining the PDP–Laban party. In 2022, he ran for the House of Representatives under the National Unity Party (NUP) and won, representing Camarines Sur's 1st District. His platform focused on youth empowerment, sports development, and economic growth.

== Personal life ==
Horibata married Franchesca Imperial on July 19, 2024. He is known for his advocacy for youth sports and education, often participating in local community programs in Camarines Sur.

House of Representatives of the Philippines
Preceded by Marissa Mercado-Andaya	Member of the House of Representatives from Camarines Sur's 1st district 2022–present	Incumbent
