= Batanes's at-large congressional district =

House of Representatives of the Philippines legislative district

- Constituency for the House of Representatives of the Philippines
- Location of Batanes within the Philippines
- Province: Batanes
- Region: Cagayan Valley
- Population: 18,831 (2020)
- Electorate: 13,665 (2025)
- Area: 219.01 km^{2} (84.56 sq mi)

Current constituency
- Created: 1909 (single-member district)
- Representative: Vacant (To be elected)

Batanes's at-large congressional district refers to the lone congressional district of the Philippines in the province of Batanes. Batanes has been represented in the country's various national legislatures since 1898. The first congressional delegation consisted of two members in the legislature of the First Philippine Republic, also known as the Malolos Congress.

Since 1909, when it was re-established as a province separate from Cagayan, Batanes has been entitled to one member in the House of Representatives of the Philippines, elected provincewide at-large, except for a brief period between 1943 and 1944 when it was absorbed by Cagayan's at-large representation for the National Assembly of the Second Philippine Republic.

From 1978 to 1984, all provinces were converted into multi-seat regional at-large districts for the Interim Batasang Pambansa of the Fourth Philippine Republic, with Batanes forming part of the seven-seat Region II's at-large district. It was restored as a single-member district in 1984.

The district is currently vacant in the 20th Congress since the death of Jun Gato of the Nationalist People's Coalition (NPC) on September 21, 2026.

== Recent election results from province-wide races ==
| Year | Office | Results |
|---|---|---|
| 2022 | President | Leni Robredo (Independent) 46.71% |
| 2022 | Vice President | Sara Duterte (Lakas) 41.86% |
| 2022 | Governor | Marilou Cayco (Liberal) 61.03% |
| 2025 | Governor | Ronald Aguto (PFP) 35.31% |

== List of members representing the district ==
=== Malolos Congress (1898–1901) ===
| Seat A | | | | | Seat B | | | | | Legislature | Constituencies |
| Portrait | Member (Lifespan) | Term of office | Party | Electoral history | Portrait | Member (Lifespan) | Term of office | Party | Electoral history | Legislature | Constituencies |
|---|---|---|---|---|---|---|---|---|---|---|---|
District created June 18, 1898.
| | Daniel Tirona (1864–1939) | September 15, 1898 – March 23, 1901 | Nonpartisan | Elected in 1898. | | Vito Belarmino (1857–1933) | September 15, 1898 – March 23, 1901 | Nonpartisan | Appointed by President Emilio Aguinaldo. | Malolos Congress | 1898–1901; Basco, Itbayat, Ivana, Mahatao, Sabtang, Uyugan |
District dissolved into Cagayan's 1st district for the Philippine Assembly.

=== House of Representatives (1916–1935) ===
| Portrait | Member (Lifespan) | Term of office | Party | Legislature | Electoral history | Constituencies |
|---|---|---|---|---|---|---|
District re-created May 20, 1909.
| | Teofilo Castillejos (1850–1910) | October 16, 1909 – July 22, 1910 | Nacionalista | 2nd Legislature | Elected in 1909. Died in office. | 1909–1935; Basco, Itbayat, Ivana, Mahatao, Sabtang, Uyugan |
| | Vicente Barsana (1865–1917) | September 5, 1911 – October 16, 1916 | Progresista | 2nd Legislature | Elected in 1911 to finish Castillejos's term. | 1909–1935; Basco, Itbayat, Ivana, Mahatao, Sabtang, Uyugan |
| | Vicente Barsana (1865–1917) | September 5, 1911 – October 16, 1916 | Progresista | 3rd Legislature | Re-elected in 1912. | 1909–1935; Basco, Itbayat, Ivana, Mahatao, Sabtang, Uyugan |
| | Juan C. Castillejos (1878–1939) | October 16, 1916 – June 3, 1919 | Nacionalista | 4th Legislature | Elected in 1916. | 1909–1935; Basco, Itbayat, Ivana, Mahatao, Sabtang, Uyugan |
| | Claudio Castillejos | June 3, 1919 – June 2, 1925 | Nacionalista | 5th Legislature | Elected in 1919. | 1909–1935; Basco, Itbayat, Ivana, Mahatao, Sabtang, Uyugan |
| | Claudio Castillejos | June 3, 1919 – June 2, 1925 | Nacionalista Unipersonalista | 6th Legislature | Re-elected in 1922. | 1909–1935; Basco, Itbayat, Ivana, Mahatao, Sabtang, Uyugan |
| | Vicente Agan (1894–1943) | June 2, 1925 – June 5, 1928 | Nacionalista Consolidado | 7th Legislature | Elected in 1925. | 1909–1935; Basco, Itbayat, Ivana, Mahatao, Sabtang, Uyugan |
| | Mariano Lizardo | June 5, 1928 – June 5, 1934 | Nacionalista Consolidado | 8th Legislature | Elected in 1928. | 1909–1935; Basco, Itbayat, Ivana, Mahatao, Sabtang, Uyugan |
| | Mariano Lizardo | June 5, 1928 – June 5, 1934 | Nacionalista Consolidado | 9th Legislature | Re-elected in 1931. | 1909–1935; Basco, Itbayat, Ivana, Mahatao, Sabtang, Uyugan |
| | Vicente Agan (1894–1943) | June 5, 1934 – November 15, 1935 | Nacionalista Democratico | 10th Legislature | Elected in 1934. | 1909–1935; Basco, Itbayat, Ivana, Mahatao, Sabtang, Uyugan |

=== 1934 Constitutional Convention (1934–1935) ===
| Seat A | | | | | Seat B | | | | | Legislature | Constituencies |
| Portrait | Member (Lifespan) | Term of office | Party | Electoral history | Portrait | Member (Lifespan) | Term of office | Party | Electoral history | Legislature | Constituencies |
|---|---|---|---|---|---|---|---|---|---|---|---|
| | Juan C. Castillejos (1878–1939) | July 30, 1934 – February 19, 1935 | Nonpartisan | Elected in 1934. | | Mariano Lizardo | July 30, 1934 – February 19, 1935 | Nonpartisan | Elected in 1934. | 1934 Constitutional Convention | 1934–1935; Basco, Itbayat, Ivana, Mahatao, Sabtang, Uyugan |

=== National Assembly (1935–1945) ===
==== Commonwealth ====
| Portrait | Member (Lifespan) | Term of office | Party | Legislature | Electoral history | Constituencies |
|---|---|---|---|---|---|---|
| | Vicente Agan (1894–1943) | November 15, 1935 – December 30, 1941 | Nacionalista Democratico | 1st National Assembly | Re-elected in 1935. | 1935–1941; Basco, Itbayat, Ivana, Mahatao, Sabtang, Uyugan |
| | Vicente Agan (1894–1943) | November 15, 1935 – December 30, 1941 | Nacionalista | 2nd National Assembly | Re-elected in 1938. | 1935–1941; Basco, Itbayat, Ivana, Mahatao, Sabtang, Uyugan |
District dissolved into the two-seat Cagayan's at-large district for the Second Republic National Assembly.

=== House of Representatives (1945–1973) ===
| Portrait | Member (Lifespan) | Term of office | Party | Legislature | Electoral history | Constituencies |
|---|---|---|---|---|---|---|
District re-created May 24, 1945.
| | Vicente Agan (1894–1943) | — | Nacionalista | 1st Commonwealth Congress | Re-elected in 1941. Died before start of term. | 1945–1973; Basco, Itbayat, Ivana, Mahatao, Sabtang, Uyugan |
| Vacant (June 9, 1945 – May 25, 1946) | | | | 1st Commonwealth Congress | No special election held to fill vacancy. | 1945–1973; Basco, Itbayat, Ivana, Mahatao, Sabtang, Uyugan |
| | Anastacio Agan | May 25, 1946 – December 30, 1949 | Nacionalista | 2nd Commonwealth Congress | Elected in 1946. | 1945–1973; Basco, Itbayat, Ivana, Mahatao, Sabtang, Uyugan |
| | Anastacio Agan | May 25, 1946 – December 30, 1949 | Nacionalista | 1st Congress | Elected in 1946. | 1945–1973; Basco, Itbayat, Ivana, Mahatao, Sabtang, Uyugan |
| | Jorge Abad (1912–1978) | December 30, 1949 – December 30, 1957 | Independent | 2nd Congress | Elected in 1949. | 1945–1973; Basco, Itbayat, Ivana, Mahatao, Sabtang, Uyugan |
| | Jorge Abad (1912–1978) | December 30, 1949 – December 30, 1957 | Liberal | 3rd Congress | Re-elected in 1953. | 1945–1973; Basco, Itbayat, Ivana, Mahatao, Sabtang, Uyugan |
| | Manuel Agudo | December 30, 1957 – December 30, 1961 | Nacionalista | 4th Congress | Elected in 1957. | 1945–1973; Basco, Itbayat, Ivana, Mahatao, Sabtang, Uyugan |
| | Jorge Abad (1912–1978) | December 30, 1961 – June 22, 1964 | Liberal | 5th Congress | Elected in 1961. Resigned on appointment as Secretary of Public Works, Transportation and Communications. | 1945–1973; Basco, Itbayat, Ivana, Mahatao, Sabtang, Uyugan |
| Vacant (June 22, 1964 – December 30, 1965) | | | | 5th Congress | No special election held to fill vacancy. | 1945–1973; Basco, Itbayat, Ivana, Mahatao, Sabtang, Uyugan |
| | Aurora Abad (1920–1991) | December 30, 1965 – December 30, 1969 | Liberal | 6th Congress | Elected in 1965. | 1945–1973; Basco, Itbayat, Ivana, Mahatao, Sabtang, Uyugan |
| | Rufino Antonio Jr. | December 30, 1969 – April 17, 1970 | Independent | 7th Congress | Elected in 1969. Election annulled by the Supreme Court after an electoral protest. | 1945–1973; Basco, Itbayat, Ivana, Mahatao, Sabtang, Uyugan |
| | Jorge Abad (1912–1978) | April 17, 1970 – January 17, 1973 | Liberal | 7th Congress | Declared winner of the 1969 elections. Term cut short upon the ratification of a new Constitution. | 1945–1973; Basco, Itbayat, Ivana, Mahatao, Sabtang, Uyugan |
District dissolved into the twelve-seat Region II's at-large district for the Interim Batasang Pambansa.

=== 1971 Constitutional Convention (1971–1972) ===
| Seat A | | | | | Seat B | | | | | Legislature | Constituencies |
| Portrait | Member (Lifespan) | Term of office | Party | Electoral history | Portrait | Member (Lifespan) | Term of office | Party | Electoral history | Legislature | Constituencies |
|---|---|---|---|---|---|---|---|---|---|---|---|
| | Geronimo Cabal | June 1, 1971 – November 29, 1972 | Nonpartisan | Elected in 1970. | | Custodio Villalva | June 1, 1971 – November 29, 1972 | Nonpartisan | Elected in 1970. | 1971 Constitutional Convention | 1971–1972; Basco, Itbayat, Ivana, Mahatao, Sabtang, Uyugan |

=== Batasang Pambansa (1978–1986) ===
| Portrait | Member (Lifespan) | Term of office | Party | Legislature | Electoral history | Constituencies |
|---|---|---|---|---|---|---|
District re-created February 1, 1984.
| | Fernando Faberes | June 30, 1984 – March 25, 1986 | KBL | Regular Batasang Pambansa | Elected in 1984. | 1978–1984; Basco, Itbayat, Ivana, Mahatao, Sabtang, Uyugan |

=== House of Representatives (1987–present) ===
| Portrait | Member (Lifespan) | Term of office | Party | Legislature | Electoral history | Constituencies |
|---|---|---|---|---|---|---|
District re-created February 2, 1987.
| | Florencio Abad (born 1954) | June 30, 1987 – December 12, 1989 | Liberal | 8th Congress | Elected in 1987. Resigned on appointment as Secretary of Agrarian Reform. | 1987–present Basco, Itbayat, Ivana, Mahatao, Sabtang, Uyugan |
| Vacant (December 12, 1989 – June 30, 1992) | | | | 8th Congress | No special election held to fill vacancy. | 1987–present Basco, Itbayat, Ivana, Mahatao, Sabtang, Uyugan |
| | Enrique Lizardo | June 30, 1992 – June 30, 1995 | LDP | 9th Congress | Elected in 1992. | 1987–present Basco, Itbayat, Ivana, Mahatao, Sabtang, Uyugan |
| | Enrique Lizardo | June 30, 1992 – June 30, 1995 | Lakas | 9th Congress | Elected in 1992. | 1987–present Basco, Itbayat, Ivana, Mahatao, Sabtang, Uyugan |
| | Florencio Abad (born 1954) | June 30, 1995 – June 30, 2004 | Liberal | 10th Congress | Elected in 1995. | 1987–present Basco, Itbayat, Ivana, Mahatao, Sabtang, Uyugan |
| | Florencio Abad (born 1954) | June 30, 1995 – June 30, 2004 | Liberal | 11th Congress | Re-elected in 1998. | 1987–present Basco, Itbayat, Ivana, Mahatao, Sabtang, Uyugan |
| | Florencio Abad (born 1954) | June 30, 1995 – June 30, 2004 | Liberal | 12th Congress | Re-elected in 2001. | 1987–present Basco, Itbayat, Ivana, Mahatao, Sabtang, Uyugan |
| | Henedina Abad (1955–2017) | June 30, 2004 – June 30, 2007 | Liberal | 13th Congress | Elected in 2004. | 1987–present Basco, Itbayat, Ivana, Mahatao, Sabtang, Uyugan |
| | Carlo Oliver Diasnes (born 1971) | June 30, 2007 – June 30, 2010 | KAMPI | 14th Congress | Elected in 2007. | 1987–present Basco, Itbayat, Ivana, Mahatao, Sabtang, Uyugan |
| | Carlo Oliver Diasnes (born 1971) | June 30, 2007 – June 30, 2010 | Lakas | 14th Congress | Elected in 2007. | 1987–present Basco, Itbayat, Ivana, Mahatao, Sabtang, Uyugan |
| | Henedina Abad (1955–2017) | June 30, 2010 – October 8, 2017 | Liberal | 15th Congress | Elected in 2010. | 1987–present Basco, Itbayat, Ivana, Mahatao, Sabtang, Uyugan |
| | Henedina Abad (1955–2017) | June 30, 2010 – October 8, 2017 | Liberal | 16th Congress | Re-elected in 2013. | 1987–present Basco, Itbayat, Ivana, Mahatao, Sabtang, Uyugan |
| | Henedina Abad (1955–2017) | June 30, 2010 – October 8, 2017 | Liberal | 17th Congress | Re-elected in 2016. Died in office. | 1987–present Basco, Itbayat, Ivana, Mahatao, Sabtang, Uyugan |
| Vacant (October 8, 2017 – June 30, 2019) | | | | 17th Congress | No special election held to fill vacancy. | 1987–present Basco, Itbayat, Ivana, Mahatao, Sabtang, Uyugan |
| | Jun Gato (1959–2026) | June 30, 2019 – September 21, 2026 | NPC | 18th Congress | Elected in 2019. | 1987–present Basco, Itbayat, Ivana, Mahatao, Sabtang, Uyugan |
| | Jun Gato (1959–2026) | June 30, 2019 – September 21, 2026 | NPC | 19th Congress | Re-elected in 2022. | 1987–present Basco, Itbayat, Ivana, Mahatao, Sabtang, Uyugan |
| | Jun Gato (1959–2026) | June 30, 2019 – September 21, 2026 | NPC | 20th Congress | Re-elected in 2025. Died in office. | 1987–present Basco, Itbayat, Ivana, Mahatao, Sabtang, Uyugan |
| Vacant (September 21, 2026 – present) | | | | 20th Congress | Special election held in 2026. | 1987–present Basco, Itbayat, Ivana, Mahatao, Sabtang, Uyugan |

== Election results ==
=== 1957 ===
1957 Philippine House of Representatives elections in Batanes
| Party | Candidate | Votes | % |
|---|---|---|---|
| Nacionalista | Manuel Agudo | 1,183 | 33.72 |
| Liberal | Jorge Abad (incumbent) | 975 | 27.79 |
| Nacionalista | Custodio Villava | 960 | 27.37 |
| Nacionalista | Salvador Reyes | 390 | 11.12 |
| Total votes | | 3,508 | 100.00 |
| Nacionalista gain from Liberal | | | |

=== 1961 ===
1961 Philippine House of Representatives elections in Batanes
| Party | Candidate | Votes | % |
|---|---|---|---|
| Liberal | Jorge Abad | 1,216 | 31.97 |
| Nacionalista | Manuel Agudo (incumbent) | 1,135 | 29.84 |
| Nacionalista | Custodio Villava | 992 | 26.08 |
| Nacionalista | Marcos Malupa | 460 | 12.10 |
| Total votes | | 3,803 | 100.00 |
| Liberal gain from Nacionalista | | | |

=== 1965 ===
1965 Philippine House of Representatives elections in Batanes
| Party | Candidate | Votes | % |
|---|---|---|---|
| Liberal | Aurora Abad | 2,629 | 66.90 |
| Nacionalista | Manuel Agudo | 1,301 | 33.10 |
| Total votes | | 3,930 | 100.00 |
| Liberal hold | | | |

=== 1969 ===
1969 Philippine House of Representatives elections in Batanes
| Party | Candidate | Votes | % |
|---|---|---|---|
| Independent | Rufino Antonio Jr. | 1,363 | 51.45 |
| Liberal | Jorge Abad | 709 | 26.76 |
| Nacionalista | Manuel Agudo | 403 | 15.21 |
| Nacionalista | Custodio Villava | 174 | 6.57 |
| Total votes | | 2,649 | 100.00 |
| Independent gain from Liberal | | | |

=== 1984 ===
1984 Philippine parliamentary election in Batanes
| Party | Candidate | Votes | % |
|---|---|---|---|
| KBL | Fernando Faberes | 2,589 | 46.94 |
| UNIDO | Priscilla Yadan | 1,004 | 18.20 |
| Nacionalista | Silvino Agudo | 942 | 17.08 |
| UNIDO | Cesar Hidalgo | 786 | 14.25 |
| Independent | Constantino Agayan | 152 | 2.76 |
| Independent | Marcial Armando | 43 | 0.78 |

=== 1987 ===
1987 Philippine House of Representatives elections in Batanes
| Party | Candidate | Votes | % |
|---|---|---|---|
| Liberal | Florencio Abad | 2,854 | 49.00 |
| Nacionalista | Fernando Faberes | 1,984 | 34.06 |
| PDP–Laban | Constantino Agayan | 987 | 16.94 |
| Total votes | | 5,825 | 100.00 |
| Liberal win (new seat) | | | |

=== 1992 ===
1992 Philippine House of Representatives elections in Batanes
| Party | Candidate | Votes | % |
|---|---|---|---|
| LDP | Enrique Lizardo | 3,358 | 58.87 |
| NPC | Fernando Faberes | 1,453 | 25.47 |
| Liberal | Antonio Escalante | 893 | 15.66 |
| Total votes | | 5,704 | 100.00 |
| LDP gain from Liberal | | | |

=== 1995 ===
1995 Philippine House of Representatives elections in Batanes
| Party | Candidate | Votes | % |
|---|---|---|---|
| Liberal | Florencio Abad | 3,354 | 53.32 |
| Lakas | Antonio Escalante | 2,936 | 46.68 |
| Total votes | | 6,290 | 100.00 |
| Liberal gain from Lakas | | | |

=== 1998 ===
1998 Philippine House of Representatives elections in Batanes
| Party | Candidate | Votes | % |
|---|---|---|---|
| Liberal | Florencio Abad (incumbent) | 4,360 | 65.44 |
| Lakas | Telesforo Castillejos | 2,303 | 34.56 |
| Valid ballots | | 6,663 | 90.67 |
| Invalid or blank votes | | 686 | 9.33 |
| Total votes | | 7,349 | 100.00 |
| Liberal hold | | | |

=== 2001 ===
2001 Philippine House of Representatives elections in Batanes
| Party | Candidate | Votes | % |
|---|---|---|---|
| Liberal | Florencio Abad (incumbent) | 4,835 | 74.34 |
| Lakas | Priscilla Yadan | 1,669 | 25.66 |
| Valid ballots | | 6,504 | 78.94 |
| Invalid or blank votes | | 1,735 | 21.06 |
| Total votes | | 8,239 | 100.00 |
| Liberal hold | | | |

=== 2004 ===
2004 Philippine House of Representatives elections in Batanes
| Party | Candidate | Votes | % |
|---|---|---|---|
| Liberal | Henedina Abad | 4,051 | 52.39 |
| Lakas | Telesforo Castillejos | 3,577 | 46.26 |
| Independent | Nicanor Abad | 77 | 1.00 |
| Independent | Florencita Nicolas | 27 | 0.35 |
| Valid ballots | | 7,732 | 87.15 |
| Invalid or blank votes | | 1,140 | 12.85 |
| Total votes | | 8,872 | 100.00 |
| Liberal hold | | | |

=== 2007 ===
2007 Philippine House of Representatives elections in Batanes
| Party | Candidate | Votes | % |
|---|---|---|---|
| KAMPI | Carlo Oliver Diasnes | 4,430 | 55.36 |
| Liberal | Vicente Gato | 3,454 | 43.16 |
| PMP | Pedro Horcajo | 118 | 1.47 |
| Valid ballots | | 8,002 | 85.63 |
| Invalid or blank votes | | 1,343 | 14.37 |
| Total votes | | 9,345 | 100.00 |
| KAMPI gain from Liberal | | | |

=== 2010 ===
2010 Philippine House of Representatives elections in Batanes
| Party | Candidate | Votes | % |
|---|---|---|---|
| Liberal | Henedina Abad | 3,076 | 37.07 |
| Lakas–Kampi | Carlo Oliver Diasnes (incumbent) | 2,988 | 36.01 |
| Independent | Alexius Narag | 2,234 | 26.92 |
| Valid ballots | | 8,298 | 81.00 |
| Invalid or blank votes | | 1,947 | 19.00 |
| Total votes | | 10,245 | 100.00 |
| Liberal gain from Lakas–Kampi | | | |

=== 2013 ===
2013 Philippine House of Representatives elections in Batanes
| Party | Candidate | Votes | % |
|---|---|---|---|
| Liberal | Henedina Abad (incumbent) | 3,813 | 45.74 |
| Independent | Carlo Oliver Diasnes | 3,676 | 44.10 |
| UNA | Anacleto Mendoza | 847 | 10.16 |
| Valid ballots | | 8,336 | 79.54 |
| Invalid or blank votes | | 2,144 | 20.46 |
| Total votes | | 10,480 | 100.00 |
| Liberal hold | | | |

=== 2016 ===
2016 Philippine House of Representatives elections in Batanes
| Party | Candidate | Votes | % |
|---|---|---|---|
| Liberal | Henedina Abad (incumbent) | 4,236 | 46.93 |
| NPC | Efren Lizardo | 1,795 | 19.88 |
| Independent | Alexius Narag | 1,517 | 16.81 |
| UNA | Nicanor Abad | 1,479 | 16.38 |
| Valid ballots | | 9,027 | 82.02 |
| Invalid or blank votes | | 1,979 | 17.98 |
| Total votes | | 11,006 | 100.00 |
| Liberal hold | | | |

=== 2019 ===
2019 Philippine House of Representatives elections in Batanes
| Party | Candidate | Votes | % |
|---|---|---|---|
| NPC | Jun Gato | 3,367 | 35.34 |
| Liberal | Florencio Abad | 3,129 | 32.84 |
| NUP | Carlo Oliver Diasnes | 3,032 | 31.82 |
| Valid ballots | | 9,528 | 78.07 |
| Invalid or blank votes | | 2,676 | 21.93 |
| Total votes | | 12,204 | 100.00 |
| NPC gain from Liberal | | | |

=== 2022 ===
2022 Philippine House of Representatives elections in Batanes
| Party | Candidate | Votes | % |
|---|---|---|---|
| NPC | Jun Gato (incumbent) | 3,872 | 33.92 |
| Liberal | Luis Abad | 3,037 | 26.61 |
| Reporma | Ronald Aguto | 2,484 | 21.76 |
| Lakas | Carlo Oliver Diasnes | 2,022 | 17.71 |
| Valid ballots | | 11,415 | 82.60 |
| Invalid or blank votes | | 2,405 | 17.40 |
| Total votes | | 13,820 | 100.00 |
| NPC hold | | | |

=== 2025 ===
2025 Philippine House of Representatives elections in Batanes
| Party | Candidate | Votes | % |
|---|---|---|---|
| NPC | Jun Gato (incumbent) | 7,380 | 66.10 |
| PFP | Marilou Cayco | 3,785 | 33.90 |
| Valid ballots | | 11,165 | 97.19 |
| Invalid or blank votes | | 323 | 2.81 |
| Total votes | | 11,488 | 100.00 |
| NPC hold | | | |

== See also ==
- Legislative districts of Batanes
