= Florencio Abad =

Filipino lawyer and politician

The Honorable Florencio Abad
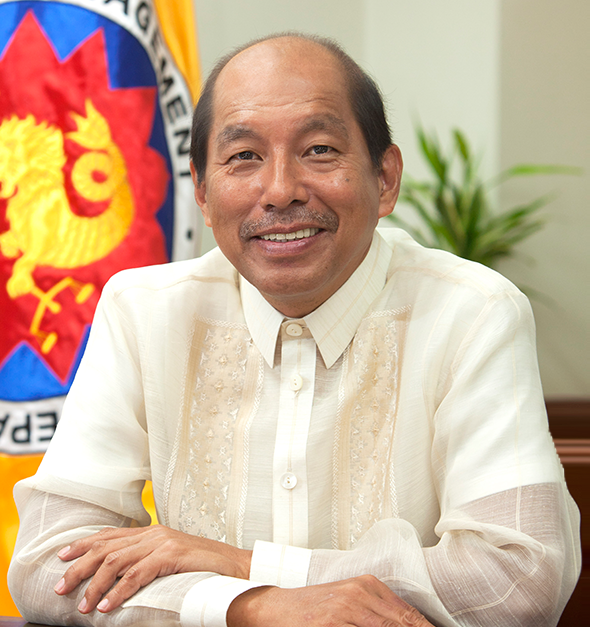

10th Secretary of Budget and Management
- In office June 30, 2010 – June 30, 2016
- President: Benigno Aquino III
- Preceded by: Rolando Andaya Jr.
- Succeeded by: Benjamin Diokno

48th Secretary of Education
- In office September 24, 2004 – July 8, 2005
- President: Gloria Macapagal Arroyo
- Preceded by: Edilberto de Jesus
- Succeeded by: Ramon Bacani (OIC)

Member of the Philippine House of Representatives from Batanes
- In office June 30, 1995 – June 30, 2004
- Preceded by: Enrique C. Lizardo
- Succeeded by: Henedina Razon-Abad
- In office June 30, 1987 – December 12, 1989
- Preceded by: Fernando Faberes
- Succeeded by: Enrique Lizardo

5th Secretary of Agrarian Reform
- In office December 12, 1989 – April 5, 1990
- President: Corazon Aquino
- Preceded by: Miriam Defensor Santiago
- Succeeded by: Benjamin T. Leong

12th President of the Liberal Party
- In office September 20, 1999 – August 9, 2004
- Preceded by: Raul Daza
- Succeeded by: Franklin Drilon

Personal details
- Born: July 13, 1954 (age 72) Sampaloc, Manila, Philippines
- Party: Liberal (1987–present)
- Spouse: Henedina Razon (died 2017)
- Relations: Pacita Abad (Sister)
- Children: Julia Andrea Abad; Pio Emmanuel Abad; Luis Andres Abad; Cecilia Paz Abad
- Education: Ateneo de Manila University (BS, LL.B); Harvard University (MPA)
- Occupation: Politician
- Profession: Lawyer

Florencio "Butch" Barsana Abad (born July 13, 1954) is a Filipino lawyer and politician. A life-long member of the Liberal Party, he served as the representative of Batanes from 1987 to 1989 and from 1995 to 2004. Abad also held many cabinet-level ranks in the past, being appointed by President Benigno Aquino III as Secretary of the Department of Budget and Management. Abad held various cabinet-level positions in the past, particularly as Secretary of the Department of Education and Secretary of the Department of Agrarian Reform.

== Early life ==
Abad was born on July 13, 1954, in Sampaloc, Manila, to a political family based in Batanes province. His parents were Jorge Abad, who was then the congressman of Batanes and later the Secretary of Public Works, Transportation and Communications during the administration of President Diosdado Macapagal, and Aurora Abad, then the future governor and congresswoman of Batanes.

== Educational background ==
Abad spent his elementary years at Lourdes School Quezon City. He finished his high school and Bachelor of Science in business management and Bachelor of Laws at the Ateneo de Manila University. He passed the Bar Examination in 1985. He completed his studies with Masters in Public Administration at the John F. Kennedy School of Government in Harvard University in Cambridge, Massachusetts as a student of the Edward Mason Program in Public Policy and Management.

== Career ==
=== Early career and entry to politics ===
Portrait during the 8th Congress

Abad had been a trade unionist of the Federation of Free Workers and Ateneo Workers College from 1976 to 1979 and was research director of Ateneo Center for Social Policy and Public Affairs. When the Congress of the Philippines was restored in 1987, Abad launched his successful congressional bid to represent the Lone District of Batanes where he became a staunch advocate of agrarian reform in the national legislature. He held the position until his appointment to his brief stint as Secretary of Agrarian Reform and ran again for Congress in 1995, serving for three more terms until 2004. As congressman, Abad opposed capital punishment, with him filing a bill that sought to repeal it from law.

=== National politics ===
In July 2004, then President Gloria Macapagal Arroyo appointed Abad as Secretary of the Department of Education. The removal of "culture" and "sports" from the Department of Education, Culture and Sports (DECS) was his proposal, in line with the thinking that the department's focus should solely be on basic education. To streamline operations, he championed the institutionalization of three agencies for the different educational levels: DepEd for elementary and secondary education, the Commission on Higher Education (CHED) for tertiary education, and the Technology Education and Skills Development Authority (TESDA) for technical and vocational education.

Amid calls for the resignation of Arroyo due to her links to the Hello Garci scandal in 2004, Abad resigned his post and became a critic of the former president. He served as the campaign manager of the Liberal Party in the 2010 presidential elections, where the party standard-bearer Benigno Aquino III, then a senator, won the race. Aquino appointed him Secretary of Budget and Management when the former assumed the presidency on June 30, 2010. His time as secretary ended with Aquino's presidency on June 30, 2016.

Abad is the architect of the Disbursement Acceleration Program. This program later declared by the Supreme Court as unconstitutional was used to siphon money from the programs set by the General Appropriations Act.

=== Comeback attempt ===
Three years after stepping down as Secretary of Budget and Management, Abad ran for Congress for Batanes's lone district in 2019, seeking to succeed his late wife, Henedina, who had died in office in 2017. However, he lost to Ciriaco Gato Jr. by 238 votes.

== Personal life ==
Abad is married to former Ateneo School of Government director and Batanes Rep. Henedina Razon-Abad and is father to four: Presidential Management Staff (PMS) chief Sec. Julia Abad, Pio Emmanuel Abad, Luis Andres Abad, and Cecilia Paz Abad. He is the brother of internationally acclaimed visual artist Pacita Abad, who died in 2004. Abad lost his wife on October 8, 2017, when she died of cancer at the age of 62.

== Electoral history ==
Electoral history of Florencio Abad
Year	Office	Party	Votes received				Result
Year	Office	Party	Total	%	P.	Swing	Result
1987	Representative (Batanes at-large)	Liberal	2,854	49.00%	1st	—N/a	Won
1995	Representative (Batanes at-large)	Liberal	3,354	53.32%	1st	—N/a	Won
1998	Representative (Batanes at-large)	Liberal	4,360	65.44%	1st	—N/a	Won
2001	Representative (Batanes at-large)	Liberal	4,835	74.34%	1st	—N/a	Won
2019	Representative (Batanes at-large)	Liberal	3,129	35.34%	2nd	—N/a	Lost

== Bibliography ==
- Daza, Raul A.; Abad, Florencio B.; Angeles, J. I. (1996). The Steadfast Keepers: Keeping Alive the Vision of Liberal Democracy in the Philippines, Mandaluyong City: National Institute for Policy Studies.
- Malaya, Jonathan E.; Abad, Florencio B. (eds.; 2006). Liberal Chronicles: 60 Years of the Liberal Party, 1946-2006, LP 60th Anniversary Organizing Committee.

Political offices
Preceded by Miriam Defensor Santiago	Secretary of Agrarian Reform; 1989–1990	Succeeded by Benjamin Leong
Preceded by Edilberto de Jesus	Secretary of Education; 2004–2005	Succeeded by Ramon Bacani; Officer-in-charge
Preceded by Rolando Andaya Jr.	Secretary of Budget and Management; 2010–2016	Succeeded by Benjamin Diokno
House of Representatives of the Philippines
Recreated Title last held by Fernando Faberes	Member of the House of Representatives from Batanes's at-large district 1987–1989	Vacant Title next held by Enrique Lizardo
Preceded by Enrique Lizardo	Member of the House of Representatives from Batanes's at-large district 1995–2004	Succeeded by Henedina Abad
