= Carlo Oliver Diasnes =

Filipino medical doctor and politician

Carlo Oliver D. Diasnes (born June 23, 1971) is a Filipino medical doctor and politician. A member of the Lakas Kampi CMD party, he served a member of the House of Representatives of the Philippines, representing the Lone District of Batanes from 2007 to 2010.

House of Representatives of the Philippines
Preceded by Henedina Abad	Representative, Lone District of Batanes; 2007–2010	Succeeded by Henedina Abad
