= Marissa Mercado-Andaya =

Filipina politician (1969–2020)

The Honorable Marissa Mercado-Andaya

Member of the Philippine House of Representatives from Camarines Sur's 1st District
- In office June 30, 2019 – July 5, 2020
- Preceded by: Rolando Andaya Jr.
- Succeeded by: Vacant (Note: Died in office; Alan Peter Cayetano and Michael John Duavit were designated as caretakers.) (post later held by Tsuyoshi Anthony Horibata)

Personal details
- Born: Marissa Lourdes Lirio Mercado; March 7, 1969 Manila, Philippines
- Died: July 5, 2020 (aged 51) Naga, Camarines Sur, Philippines
- Cause of death: Cancer
- Party: Nationalist People's Coalition
- Spouse: Rolando Andaya Jr.
- Children: 2
- Occupation: Politician

Marissa Lourdes Mercado Andaya (born Marissa Lourdes Lirio Mercado; March 7, 1969 – July 5, 2020) was a Filipina politician who served as congresswoman for Camarines Sur's 1st congressional district from 2019 until her death in 2020.

== Personal life and death ==
Mercado-Andaya was born on March 7, 1969. She married Rolando Andaya Jr., and together they had two children named Rolando IV ("Ranton") and Katrina.

In the 2019 elections, she ran as congresswoman for Camarines Sur's 1st district and emerged victorious with 61,480 votes against her sole opponent, Long Mejia, who received 29,228 votes. She took over the position from her term-limited husband, who, in turn, ran for governor of Camarines Sur but was unsuccessful.

=== Illness and death ===
Mercado-Andaya was diagnosed with cancer, and her symptoms reemerged in 2020. On July 5, 2020, she died at the age of 51 in Naga City, Camarines Sur. The announcement of her death was made by her husband and her children.

== Notes ==
House of Representatives of the Philippines
Preceded by Rolando Andaya Jr.	Member of the House of Representatives from Camarines Sur's 1st district 2019–2020	Succeeded by Hori Horibata
