= Aurora Abad =

Filipino politician (1920–1991)

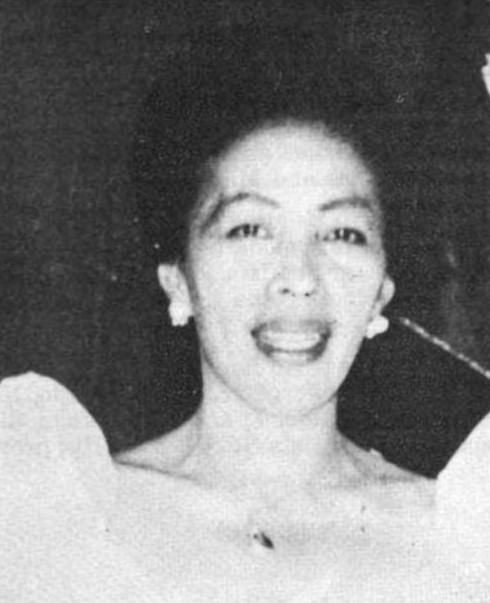
- Abad in the 6th Congress

Member of the Philippine House of Representatives for Batanes's at-large district
- In office December 30, 1965 – December 30, 1969
- Preceded by: Jorge Abad
- Succeeded by: Rufino Antonio Jr.

Governor of Batanes
- In office June 18, 1986 – November 30, 1987
- Appointed by: Corazon Aquino
- Preceded by: Mario Lizardo
- Succeeded by: Godofredo Fabi

Personal details
- Born: Aurora Agan Barsana; September 9, 1920 Ivana, Batanes, Philippine Islands
- Died: September 23, 1991 (aged 71)
- Party: Liberal (1965–1991)
- Spouse: Jorge Abad (m. 1937; died 1979)
- Children: 13, including Florencio and Pacita

Aurora Agan Barsana-Abad (September 9, 1920 – September 23, 1991) was a Filipino politician who served as a member of the Philippine House of Representatives for Batanes's at-large congressional district from 1965 to 1969. A member of the Liberal Party, she later served as governor of Batanes from 1986 to 1987.

== Early life and education ==
Aurora Agan Barsana was born on September 9, 1920, in Ivana, Batanes, to former governor Bernardo Barsana and Esperanza Agan. She attended Ivana Elementary School for her primary education and Batanes High School for her secondary education.

== Career ==
Abad served as her husband Jorge's private secretary during his tenure as representative for Batanes in the House of Representatives from 1949 to 1957, and again from 1961 to 1964. When Jorge was appointed by President Diosdado Macapagal as secretary of public works and communications in 1964, she campaigned for the district's congressional seat to succeed her husband and eventually won in the 1965 elections. As representative during the 6th Congress, she once chaired the House committee on local governments, served as vice chairperson of the committee on education, and was a member of the committees on accounts, agrarian and social welfare, appropriations, and public works. She only served one term until 1969.

In 1986, President Corazon Aquino appointed Abad as governor of Batanes, serving from June 1986 until November 1987.

== Personal life ==
She was married to Jorge Abad from June 1, 1937, until his death in 1979. They had 13 children, including Florencio, a future budget and management secretary, and Pacita, a visual artist.

Abad died on September 23, 1991.

== Electoral history ==
Electoral history of Aurora Abad
Year	Office	Party	Votes received				Result
Year	Office	Party	Total	%	P.	Swing	Result
1965	Representative (Batanes)	Liberal	2,629	66.90%	1st	—N/a	Won

House of Representatives of the Philippines
Preceded by Jorge Abad	Member of the Philippine House of Representatives for Batanes's at-large district December 30, 1965 – December 30, 1969	Succeeded by Rufino Antonio Jr.
Political offices
Preceded by Mario Lizardo	Governor of Batanes; June 18, 1986 – November 30, 1987	Succeeded by Godofredo Fabi
