= Rolando Andaya Jr. =

Filipino lawyer and politician (1969–2022)

The Honorable Rolando Andaya Jr.
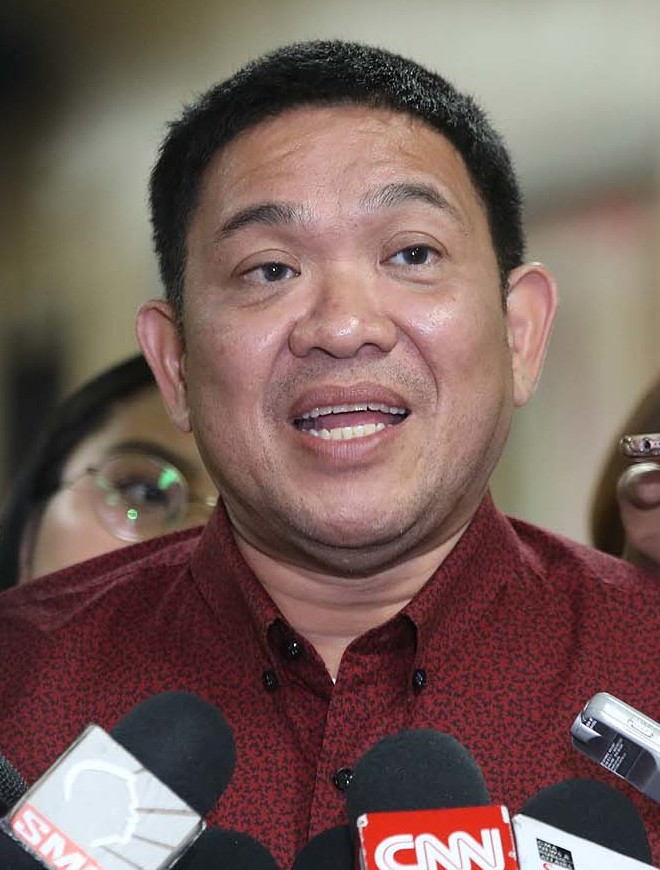
- Andaya in 2019

Deputy Speaker of the House of Representatives of the Philippines
- In office August 16, 2016 – July 30, 2018
- Speaker: Pantaleon Alvarez; Gloria Macapagal Arroyo

House Majority Leader
- In office July 30, 2018 – January 21, 2019
- Preceded by: Rodolfo Fariñas
- Succeeded by: Fredenil Castro

Member of the House of Representatives from Camarines Sur's 1st district
- In office June 30, 2010 – June 30, 2019
- Preceded by: Dato Arroyo
- Succeeded by: Marissa Mercado-Andaya
- In office June 30, 1998 – February 4, 2006
- Preceded by: Rolando R. Andaya
- Succeeded by: Vacant (post later held by Dato Arroyo)

Secretary of Budget and Management
- In office February 5, 2006 – February 24, 2010
- President: Gloria Macapagal Arroyo
- Preceded by: Romulo Neri
- Succeeded by: Florencio Abad

Personal details
- Born: Rolando Aureo Gutierrez Andaya Jr. March 10, 1969 Manila, Philippines
- Died: June 30, 2022 (aged 53) Naga, Camarines Sur, Philippines
- Party: NPC (2015–2016; 2018–2022)
- Other political affiliations: PDP–Laban (2016–2018); Lakas–CMD (2007–2015); Liberal (2004–2007); Lakas–NUCD (until 2004)
- Spouse: Marissa Mercado (died 2020)
- Children: 2
- Education: De La Salle University (BS); Ateneo de Manila University (LL.B)
- Occupation: Politician
- Profession: Lawyer

Rolando Aureo Gutierrez Andaya Jr. (March 10, 1969 – June 30, 2022), also known as Nonoy Andaya, was a Filipino lawyer and politician who served as a member of the House of Representatives. He represented the 1st district of Camarines Sur from 1998 to 2006 and again from 2010 to 2019. During the 17th Congress, he was a House Deputy Speaker from 2016 to 2018 and was subsequently elected House Majority Leader, serving from 2018 to 2019. In his inter-congressional years, he was the Secretary of Budget and Management from 2006 to 2010 in President Gloria Macapagal Arroyo's cabinet.

== Early life and education ==
Rolando Aureo Gutierrez Andaya Jr. was born on March 10, 1969 in Manila, the son of politician Rolando Andaya Sr. and Rita Gutierrez. His grandfather, Tomas Andaya, was mayor of Ragay, Camarines Sur in the 1960s. He was also the older brother of Maribel Andaya-Eusebio, mayor of Pasig from 2013 to 2016 and wife of Robert "Bobby" Eusebio.

For his elementary education, Andaya studied at De La Salle Santiago Zobel School. For his secondary education, he went to Perryton High School in Texas where he graduated in 1987. In 1991, he graduated with a degree in Business and Economics, major in Legal Management from De La Salle University, and in 1995, he graduated with a Bachelor of Laws degree from Ateneo de Manila University. He passed the bar examinations that same year.

== Political career ==
Prior to becoming a congressman, Andaya worked at the Securities and Exchange Commission from 1996 to 1998.

He was the Representative of the 1st district of Camarines Sur from 1998 to 2006 during the 11th, 12th, and 13th Congresses. During his first term, Andaya was a member of the "Spice Boys", a group of young congressmen who were openly critical of President Joseph Estrada and his administration. In October 2000, he was among the 40 representatives who signed the impeachment complaint against President Estrada. After Estrada's ouster, he became the chairman of the House Committee on Appropriations, serving from 2001 to 2006. His term in the 13th Congress was cut short in February 2006 due to his appointment as Secretary of Budget and Management by President Gloria Macapagal Arroyo. His tenure as budget secretary was marred by allegations of graft and malversation. He served in that position until his resignation in February 2010 to run again for Congress. On June 30, 2010, he was sworn in as the representative of the 1st district of Camarines Sur during the 15th Congress. He ran again successfully in the succeeding House elections of 2013 and 2016, serving uninterrupted as a congressman until 2019, after which his wife took over until her untimely death in July 2020.

In August 2016, during his time in the 17th Congress, he was appointed Deputy Speaker of the House for Bicol. Following the ouster of Pantaleon Alvarez as House Speaker, Andaya was elected House Majority Leader to replace Alvarez's ally Rodolfo Fariñas on July 30, 2018. In January 2019, he stepped down as Majority Floor Leader to chair again the House Committee on Appropriations. He served until the end of his term on June 30, 2019.

He ran for Governor of Camarines Sur in 2019 but lost to incumbent Miguel Luis Villafuerte. In the run-up to the 2022 election, he filed his candidacy for his former House seat. However, he later withdrew and opted to run for governor again; his sister Maribel replaced him in the House race. His gubernatorial campaign was endorsed by fellow Camarines Sur native Vice President Leni Robredo, who at that time was running for president. He lost to Villafuerte's brother Luigi, a political neophyte. Maribel also lost in the House election.

=== Party affiliations ===
Andaya and his father were members of Lakas–CMD, led by Presidents Fidel V. Ramos (in office 1992–1998) and Gloria Macapagal Arroyo (in office 2001–2010). He endorsed the 2010 presidential bid of Lakas-Kampi-CMD standard bearer Gilbert Teodoro.

In September 2015, he defected to the Nationalist People's Coalition (NPC) and supported the 2016 presidential campaign of Senator Grace Poe (an independent). In May 2016, shortly after Rodrigo Duterte won the 2016 presidential election, Andaya joined Duterte's party, PDP–Laban, which led the majority coalition in the 17th Congress. In 2019 and 2022, he ran for governor of Camarines Sur as a member of the NPC. In November 2021, he resigned as NPC's Camarines Sur provincial chair and also resigned from local party Anduyog.

== Controversies ==
=== Pork barrel scam ===
In May 2014, a banner story published by the Philippine Daily Inquirer implicated Andaya, among other officials of the Arroyo administration, in the Priority Development Assistance Fund scam. It alleged that during his time as budget secretary, he received at least ₱255 million as "commission" for various projects implemented by the Department of Agrarian Reform. He later denied any involvement in saying that he had "not received any amount, whether in cash or in check, as commission from [Janet Lim-]Napoles, or from any of her staff or agents".

=== Malampaya fund scam ===
In October 2013, plunder charges were filed at the Office of the Ombudsman by the National Bureau of Investigation against former-President Arroyo and other officials of her administration including Andaya in connection with the alleged misuse of the Malampaya gas fund. In December 2017, the Ombudsman charged Andaya, along with convicted plunderer Janet Lim-Napoles and former Agrarian Reform Secretary Nasser Pangandaman, with 97 counts of graft and malversation before the Sandiganbayan for their alleged involvement in the Malampaya fund scam. Andaya's alleged role in the scam was his signing of the Special Allotment Release Order (SARO) which was "fraught with irregularities constituting badges of fraud". In March 2019, the Sandiganbayan denied Andaya's appeal to dismiss the charges against him. In July that year, he refused to enter plea during his arraignment which prompted the court to enter a not-guilty plea for him.

=== Statement of Assets, Liabilities, and Net Worth ===
In October 2018, an administrative complaint was filed by the Presidential Anti-Corruption Commission at the Office of the Ombudsman against Andaya and his wife for his alleged misdeclaration of properties in his 2016 and 2017 Statements of Assets, Liabilities and Net Worth (SALN). He later dismissed the allegations and deemed it "part of an ongoing hatchet job" connected to his 2019 gubernatorial campaign.

== Personal life and death ==
Andaya was married to congresswoman Marissa Mercado until her death on July 5, 2020, from cancer. They had two children.

On June 30, 2022, Andaya was found dead in his residence in Naga, five days short of his wife's second death anniversary. The cause of his death was not disclosed by his family. Naga City police stated that he bore a gunshot wound in his right temple, but had not determined if he died by suicide. He was 53.

=== Assassination attempts ===
On October 16, 2018, Andaya was at the Camarines Sur capitol complex in Pili to file his candidacy for the 2019 gubernatorial elections. Shortly after, a security guard approached Andaya and allegedly tried to pull out his revolver from its holster but inadvertently dropped it. The guard, Ray John Musa, was seized by Andaya's companions and was arrested. Andaya alluded that his political rivals were behind the attempt on his life.

On June 1, 2021, Andaya was driving his Toyota Land Cruiser in Barangay Palestina, Pili when two men aboard a motorcycle fired at his vehicle before fleeing. Neither Andaya nor his companions were hurt during the incident. The police immediately initiated an investigation.

House of Representatives of the Philippines
Preceded by Dato Arroyo	Member of the House of Representatives from Camarines Sur's 1st district 2010–2019	Succeeded by Marissa Mercado-Andaya
Preceded by Rolando R. Andaya Sr.	Member of the House of Representatives from Camarines Sur's 1st district 1998–2006	Succeeded by Dato Arroyo
Preceded by Rodolfo Fariñas	House Majority Leader; 2018–2019	Succeeded by Fredenil Castro
Government offices
Preceded by Romulo Neri	Secretary of Budget and Management; 2006–2010	Succeeded by Florencio Abad
