= 1969 Philippine House of Representatives elections =

14th Philippine House of Representatives elections

- November 11, 1969

All 110 seats in the House of Representatives of the Philippines 56 seats needed for a majority
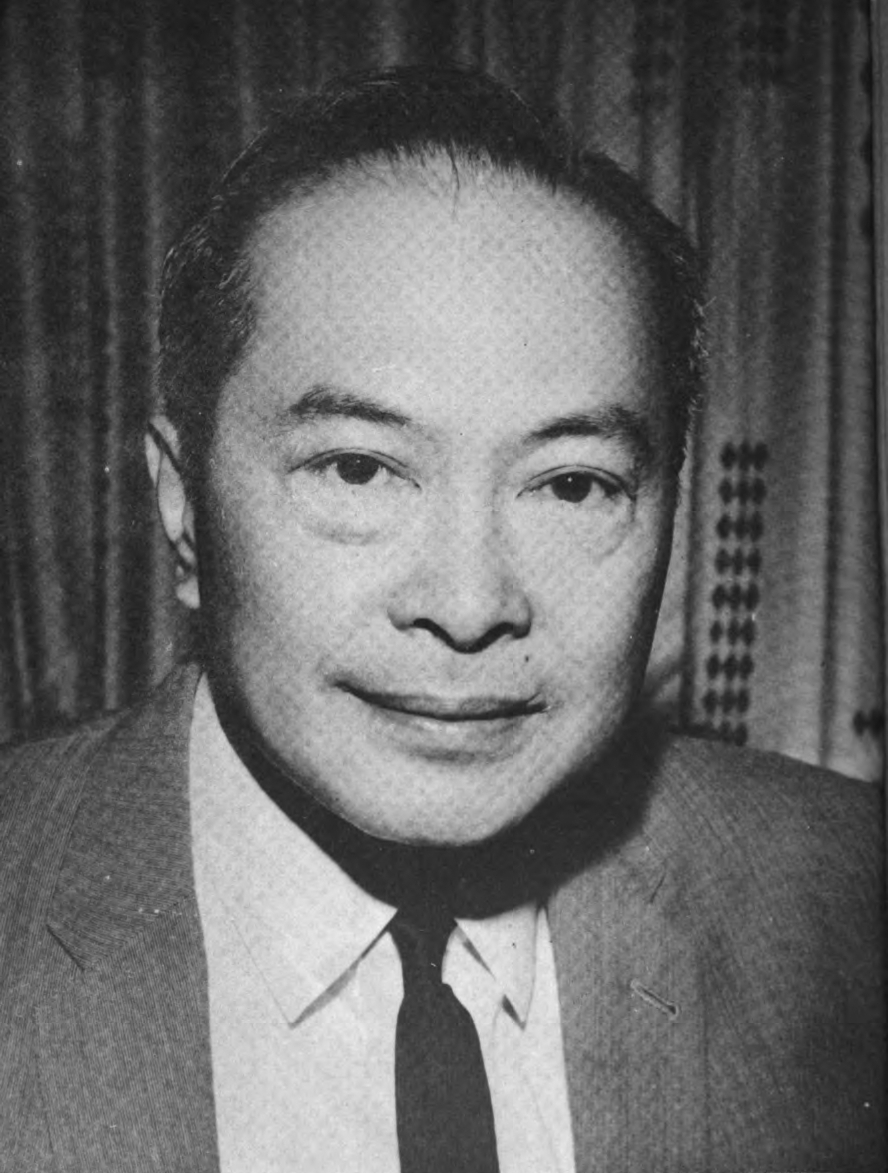

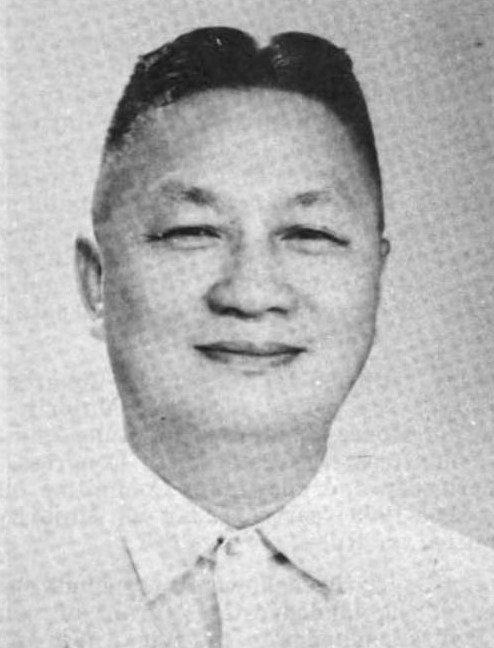
	Majority party	Minority party
Leader	Jose Laurel Jr.	Justiniano Montano
Party	Nacionalista	Liberal
Leader's seat	Batangas–3rd	Cavite
Last election	38 seats, 41.76%	61 seats, 51.32%
Seats won	88	18
Seat change	▲50	▼43
Popular vote	4,590,374	2,641,786
Percentage	58.93	33.91
Swing	▲17.17	▼17.41
- Results: Nacionalista Liberal; Nacionalista (Independent) Independent
Speaker before election
Jose Laurel Jr.
Nacionalista
Elected Speaker
Jose Laurel Jr.
Nacionalista

Elections for the House of Representatives of the Philippines were held on November 11, 1969. Held on the same day as the presidential election, the party of the incumbent president, Ferdinand Marcos's Nacionalista Party, won a majority of the seats in the House of Representatives.

The elected representatives served in the 7th Congress from 1969 to 1973, although it was cut short due to the proclamation of martial law on September 23, 1972 by President Marcos. The proclamation suspended the Constitution and closed both chambers of Congress, which enabled Marcos to rule by decree. The Constitutional Convention then passed a new constitution, which was approved by the electorate in a 1973 plebiscite that abolished the bicameral Congress and instead instituted a unicameral Batasang Pambansa (National Assembly).

== Electoral system ==
The House of Representatives has at most 120 seats, 110 seats for this election, all voted via first-past-the-post in single-member districts. Each province is guaranteed at least one congressional district, with more populous provinces divided into two or more districts.

Congress has the power of redistricting three years after each census.

== Results ==
Party	Votes	%	+/–	Seats	+/–
Nacionalista Party	4,590,374	58.93	+17.17	88	+50
Liberal Party	2,641,786	33.91	−17.41	18	−43
Nacionalista Party (independent)	129,424	1.66	+0.67	2	+1
Liberal Party (independent)	24,546	0.32	−1.16	0	−1
Party for Philippine Progress	5,031	0.06	−0.52	0	0
Young Philippines	3,917	0.05	−0.12	0	0
Reformist Party	43	0.00	New	0	0
Independent	394,700	5.07	+1.37	2	−1
Total	7,789,821	100.00	–	110	+6
Valid votes	7,789,821	94.97	−0.32		
Invalid/blank votes	412,970	5.03	+0.32		
Total votes	8,202,791	100.00	–		
Registered voters/turnout	10,300,898	79.63	+3.24		
Source: Nohlen, Grotz and Hartmann and Teehankee

Vote share
NP	58.93%
LP	33.91%
Others	7.16%

Seats
NP	80.00%
LP	16.36%
Others	3.64%

== See also ==
- 7th Congress of the Philippines

== Bibliography ==
- Paras, Corazon L. (2000). The Presidents of the Senate of the Republic of the Philippines. ISBN 971-8832-24-6.
- Pobre, Cesar P. (2000). Philippine Legislature 100 Years. ISBN 971-92245-0-9.
