= List of current members of the Congress of the Philippines by wealth =

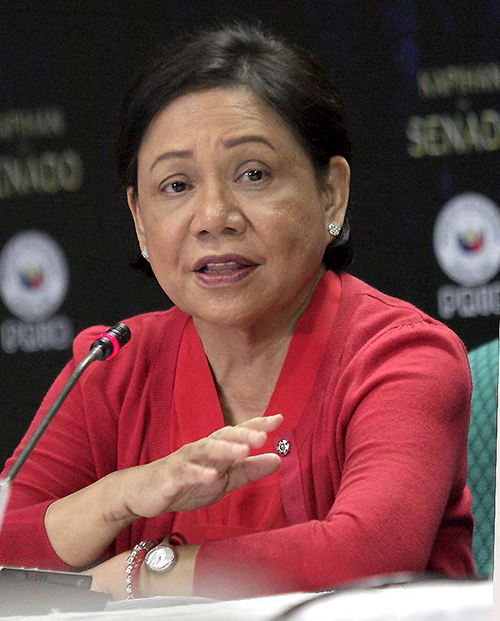
Sen. Cynthia Villar (Nacionalista), with a net worth of ₱3.8 billion, is the wealthiest member of the Senate as of December 31, 2019.

This list of members of the Congress of the Philippines by wealth includes only the 50 richest current members of the Congress of the Philippines based on their statement of assets, liabilities and net worth as of December 31, 2018 for the House of Representatives and as of December 31, 2019 for the Senate.

== List of members by net worth ==
Rank	Name (Province/City–District)	Chamber	Party	Net worth
1	Mikee Romero	House of Representatives	1-PACMAN	₱6.5 billion (Note: As of September 18, 2020.)
2	Cynthia Villar	Senate	Nacionalista	₱3.8 billion (Note: As of December 31, 2019.)
3	Manny Pacquiao	Senate	PDP–Laban	₱3.2 billion
4	Virgilio Lacson	House of Representatives	MANILA TEACHERS	₱793.9 million (Note: As of December 31, 2018.)
5	Bayani Fernando (Marikina–1st)	House of Representatives	NPC	₱748 million
6	Ralph Recto	Senate	Nacionalista	₱567.4 million
6	Vilma Santos-Recto (Batangas–6th)	House of Representatives	Nacionalista	₱567.4 million
7	Yedda Marie Romualdez	House of Representatives	TINGOG SINIRANGAN	₱487.6 million
8	Juan Pablo Bondoc (Pampanga–4th)	House of Representatives	PDP–Laban	₱426.6 million
9	Lucy Torres-Gomez (Leyte–4th)	House of Representatives	PDP–Laban	₱335.3 million
10	Rosanna Vergara (Nueva Ecija–3rd)	House of Representatives	PDP–Laban	₱327.4 million
11	Abraham Tolentino (Cavite–8th)	House of Representatives	NUP	₱302.2 million
12	Manuel Luis Lopez (Manila–1st)	House of Representatives	NPC	₱261.1 million
13	Alex Advincula (Cavite–3rd)	House of Representatives	NUP	₱260.3 million
14	Michael John Duavit (Rizal–1st)	House of Representatives	NPC	₱258.7 million
15	Micaela Violago (Nueva Ecija–2nd)	House of Representatives	NUP	₱256.4 million
16	Vicente Veloso III (Leyte–3rd)	House of Representatives	NUP	₱230.8 million
17	Strike Revilla (Cavite–2nd)	House of Representatives	NUP	₱220.3 million
18	Luis Raymund Villafuerte (Camarines Sur–2nd)	House of Representatives	Nacionalista	₱212.9 million
19	Migz Zubiri	Senate	Independent	₱203.7 million
20	Henry Oaminal Sr. (Misamis Occidental–2nd)	House of Representatives	Nacionalista	₱190.6 million
21	Bong Revilla	Senate	Lakas	₱176.4 million
22	Aurelio Gonzales Jr. (Pampanga–3rd)	House of Representatives	PDP–Laban	₱164.1 million
23	Jocelyn Limkaichong (Negros Oriental–1st)	House of Representatives	Liberal	₱156.3 million
24	Ronaldo Zamora (San Juan–Lone)	House of Representatives	PDP–Laban	₱153.4 million
25	Juliet Marie Ferrer (Negros Occidental–4tg)	House of Representatives	NUP	₱151.3 million
26	Sonny Angara	Senate	LDP	₱142.2 million
27	Weslie Gatchalian (Valenzuela City–1st)	House of Representatives	NPC	₱141.6 million
28	Edgar Mary Sarmiento (Samar–1st)	House of Representatives	NUP	₱129.7 million
29	Rose Marie Arenas (Zambales–1st)	House of Representatives	PDP–Laban	₱124.7 million
30	Mark Go (Baguio City–Lone)	House of Representatives	Nacionalista	₱108.8 million
31	Franklin Drilon	Senate	Liberal	₱102.3 million
32	Grace Poe	Senate	Independent	₱97.6 million
33	Jeffrey Khonghun (Zambales–1st)	House of Representatives	Nacionalista	₱95.9 million
34	Win Gatchalian	Senate	NPC	₱95.4 million
35	Manuel Zubiri (Bukidnon–3rd)	House of Representatives	BPP	₱95.1 million
36	Enrico Pineda	House of Representatives	1-PACMAN	₱93 million
37	Pantaleon Alvarez (Davao del Norte–1st)	House of Representatives	PDP–Laban	₱91.2 million
38	Victor Yap (Tarlac–2nd)	House of Representatives	NPC	₱86.7 million
39	Carlos Cojuangco (Tarlac–1st)	House of Representatives	NPC	₱86.3 million
40	Pia Cayetano	Senate	Nacionalista	₱82.8 million
41	Dulce Ann Hofer (Zamboanga Sibugay–2nd)	House of Representatives	PDP–Laban	₱82.5 million
42	Abdullah Dimaporo (Lanao del Norte–2nd)	House of Representatives	NPC	₱80.9 million
43	Tito Sotto	Senate	NPC	₱77.8 million
44	Florida Robes (San Jose del Monte–Lone)	House of Representatives	NUP	₱76.8 million
45	Glona Labadlabad (Zamboanga del Norte–2nd)	House of Representatives	PDP–Laban	₱74.7 million
46	Prospero Pichay Jr. (Surigao del Sur–1st)	House of Representatives	Lakas	₱74.1 million
47	Joseph Sto. Niño Bernos (Abra–Lone)	House of Representatives	Nacionalista	₱74 million
48	Cristal Bagatsing (Manila–5th)	House of Representatives	Nacionalista	₱71.5 million
49	Ley Corazon (Cebu City–2nd)	House of Representatives	LDP	₱71.4 million
50	Richard Gordon	Senate	Independent	₱71.2 million
