= Globalport 900 =

Philippine port operator company

Globalport 900, Inc.
- Company type: Public
- Traded as: PSE: PORT
- Industry: Ports industry
- Founded: May 1, 1933; 93 years ago as the Metropolitan Insurance Company; December 7, 2011; 14 years ago as Globalport 900
- Headquarters: Pasig, Metro Manila, Philippines
- Services: Seaport operations
- Subsidiaries: Globalport Terminals, Inc.
- Website: www.globalport900.com

Globalport 900, Inc. is a port operating company based in the Philippines.

== History ==
Globalport 900, Inc. was originally an insurance company known as Metropolitan Insurance Company (MIC). MIC became a holding company named MIC Holdings Corporation in 1999.

In 2011, MIC Holdings Corporation, ran by the Antonio Cojuangco Jr., was acquired by Sultan 900 Capital Inc. of Mikee Romero. The MIC holdings company became Globalport 900.

Globalport inherited MIC's listing in the Philippine Stock Exchange. However its listing was suspended in 2014 and became dormant in 2017. It remains dormant as of 2022.

== Ports ==
Under its subsidiary Globalport Terminals, Inc. the company operates the following ports

- Port of Nasipit
- Port of Bacolod
- Port of Tagbilaran
- Port of Davao
- Port of Iligan
- Port of Matnog
- Port of Ozamiz
- Port of Pulupandan
- Port of Surigao
- Port of Tacloban
- Port of Zamboanga

== Sports ==
Globalport 900 has a basketball team at the Philippine Basketball Association, the NorthPort Batang Pier. The GlobalPort Polo Team also bears the name of the company.
