= Congress of the Philippines =

National legislature of the Philippines

Congress of the Philippines Kongreso ng Pilipinas (Filipino)
- 20th Congress of the Philippines
- Seals of the Senate (left) and of the House of Representatives (right)

Type
- Type: Bicameral
- Houses: Senate; House of Representatives

History
- Founded: June 9, 1945; 81 years ago
- Preceded by: National Assembly of the Philippines
- New session started: July 28, 2025; 15 months ago

Leadership
- President of the Senate: Sherwin Gatchalian (NPC) since June 17, 2026
- Speaker of the House of Representatives: Bojie Dy (PFP) since September 17, 2025

Structure
- Seats: 342 (see list); 24 senators 318 representatives
- Senate political groups: Majority (14): NPC (5); Akbayan (1); Liberal (1); Lakas (1); KANP (1); Nacionalista (1); Independent (4); Minority (11): Nacionalista (3); PDP (3); NPC (1); PMP (1); Independent (2)
- House of Representatives political groups: Majority (285): Lakas (73); NUP (54); PFP (52); Party-lists (45); NPC (35); Nacionalista (17); Liberal (3); MKTZNU (2); 1CEBU (1); CDP (1); LDP (1); Navoteño (1); PDP (1); Independent (1); Minority (27): Party-lists (20); Liberal (3); NUP (2); Lakas (1); Nacionalista (1); Independent (5): HTL (3); Lakas (1); Party-list (1); Vacant (1): Vacant (1)
- Joint committees: Joint committees are chaired by senators
- Authority: Article VI of the Constitution of the Philippines

Elections
- Senate voting system: Plurality block voting
- House of Representatives voting system: Parallel voting (Party-list proportional representation and first-past-the-post)
- First Senate election: October 3, 1916
- First House of Representatives election: May 11, 1987 (current form) July 30, 1907 (as the Philippine Assembly)
- Last Senate election: May 12, 2025
- Last House of Representatives election: May 12, 2025
- Next Senate election: May 8, 2028
- Next House of Representatives election: May 8, 2028

Meeting place
- The Senate meets at the GSIS Building, Financial Center, Jose W. Diokno Boulevard, Pasay
- The House of Representatives meets at the Batasang Pambansa Complex, Quezon City, which also hosts joint sessions

Website
- econgress.gov.ph

The Congress of the Philippines (Filipino: Kongreso ng Pilipinas) is the legislature of the national government of the Philippines. It is bicameral, composed of an upper body, the Senate, and a lower body, the House of Representatives, although colloquially, the term "Congress" commonly refers to just the latter. (Note: The URL of the website of the House of Representatives is, for example, www.congress.gov.ph.) The Senate meets at the GSIS Building in Pasay, while the House of Representatives meets at the Batasang Pambansa in Quezon City, which also hosts joint sessions.

The Senate is composed of 24 senators half of which are elected every three years. Each senator serves a total of six years accordingly. The senators are elected at-large and do not represent any geographical district.

In the current 20th Congress, there are 317 seats in the House of Representatives. The Constitution states that the House "shall be composed of not more than 250 members, unless otherwise fixed by law", and that at least 20% of it shall be sectoral representatives. There are two types of congressmen: the district and party-list representatives. At the time of the ratification of the constitution, there were 200 districts, leaving 50 seats for party-list representatives.

The district congressmen represent a particular congressional district of the country. All provinces in the country are composed of at least one congressional district. Several cities also have their own congressional districts, with some having two or more representatives. From 200 districts in 1987, the number of districts have increased to 254 at the beginning of the 20th Congress. Every new Congress has seen an increase in the number of districts.

The party-list congressmen represent the minority sectors of the population. This enables these minority groups to be represented in the Congress, when they would otherwise not be represented properly through district representation. Party-list representatives represent labor unions, rights groups, and other organizations. With the increase of districts also means that the seats for party-list representatives increase as well, as the 1:4 ratio has to be respected.

The Constitution provides that Congress shall convene for its regular session every year beginning on the fourth Monday of July. A regular session can last until thirty days before the opening of its next regular session in the succeeding year. The president may, however, call special sessions which are usually held between regular legislative sessions to handle emergencies or urgent matters.

== History ==
=== Spanish colonial period ===
During the Spanish colonization of the Philippines, municipal governments, or Cabildos were established. One such example was the Cabildo in Manila, established in 1571.

While the Philippines was under colonial rule as part of the Spanish East Indies, the colony had no representation in the Spanish Cortes. Only in 1809, when the colony was made an integral part of Spain, did it gain representation in the Cortes. While colonies such as the Philippines were selecting their delegates, substitutes were named so that the Cortes could convene. The substitutes, and first delegates for the Philippines were Pedro Pérez de Tagle and José Manuel Couto. Neither had any connection to the colony.

By July 1810, Governor General Manuel González de Aguilar received the instruction to hold an election. As only the Manila Municipal Council qualified to elect a representative, it was tasked to select a delegate. Three of its representatives, the governor-general and the Archbishop of Manila selected Ventura de los Reyes as Manila's delegate to the Cortes. De los Reyes arrived in Cadiz in December 1811.

However, with Napoleon I's defeat in 1814, his brother Joseph Bonaparte was removed from the Spanish throne, and the Cádiz Constitution was abolished by Ferdinand VII, who returned to the absolute monarchy, that removed Philippine representation on the Cortes, among other things. Restoration of Philippine representation to the Cortes was one of the grievances by the Ilustrados, the educated class during the late 19th century.

=== Revolutionary era ===
The Illustrados' campaign transformed into the Philippine Revolution that aimed to overthrow Spanish rule. Proclaiming independence on June 12, 1898, President Emilio Aguinaldo then ordered the convening of a revolutionary congress at Malolos. The Malolos Congress, among other things, approved the Malolos Constitution. With the approval of the Treaty of Paris, the Spanish ceded the Philippines to the United States. The revolutionaries, attempting to prevent American conquest, launched the Philippine–American War, but were defeated when Aguinaldo was captured in 1901.

=== American colonial period ===
When the Philippines was under American colonial rule, the legislative body was the Philippine Commission which existed from 1900 to 1907. The President of the United States appointed the members of the Philippine Commission. Furthermore, two Filipinos served as Resident Commissioners to the House of Representatives of the United States from 1907 to 1935, then only one from 1935 to 1946. The Resident Commissioners had a voice in the House, but did not have voting rights.

The Philippine Bill of 1902 mandated the creation of a bicameral or a two-chamber Philippine Legislature with the Philippine Commission as the Upper House and the Philippine Assembly as the Lower House. This bicameral legislature was inaugurated in 1907. Through the leadership of then-Speaker Sergio Osmeña and then-Majority Floor Leader Manuel L. Quezon, the Rules of the 59th United States Congress were substantially adopted as the Rules of the Philippine Legislature.

In 1916, the Jones Law changed the legislative system. The Philippine Commission was abolished, and a new bicameral Philippine Legislature consisting of a House of Representatives and a Senate was established.

=== Commonwealth and Second Republic era ===
The legislative system was changed again in 1935. The 1935 Constitution, aside from instituting the Commonwealth which gave the Filipinos more role in government, established a unicameral National Assembly. But in 1940, through an amendment to the 1935 Constitution, a bicameral Congress of the Philippines consisting of a House of Representatives and a Senate was created. Those elected in 1941 would not serve until 1945, as World War II erupted. The invading Japanese set up the Second Philippine Republic and convened its own National Assembly. With the Japanese defeat in 1945, the Commonwealth and its Congress was restored. The same setup continued until the Americans granted independence on July 4, 1946.

=== Independence era ===
Upon the inauguration of the Republic of the Philippines on July 4, 1946, Republic Act No. 6 was enacted providing that on the date of the proclamation of the Republic of the Philippines, the existing Congress would be known as the First Congress of the Republic. Successive Congresses were elected until President Ferdinand Marcos declared martial law on September 23, 1972. Marcos then ruled by decree.

As early as 1970, Marcos had convened a constitutional convention to revise the 1935 Constitution; in 1973, the Constitution was approved. It abolished the bicameral Congress and created a unicameral National Assembly, which would ultimately be known as the Batasang Pambansa in a semi-presidential system of government. The Batasang Pambansa first convened in 1978, and elected a prime minister.

Marcos was overthrown after the People Power Revolution; President Corazon Aquino then ruled by decree. Later that year she appointed a constitutional commission that drafted a new constitution. The Constitution was approved in a plebiscite the next year; it restored the presidential system of government together with a bicameral Congress of the Philippines. The restored Congress first convened in 1987.

Congress, constituted by the Senate and the House of Representatives, is also responsible for the passing of the Anti-Political Dynasty Bill, which is mandated by the 1987 Constitution. Congress has failed to pass the anti-dynasty bill in the last four decades, with the Supreme Court of the Philippines unanimously ruling in 2026 that this failure constitutes grave abuse of discretion. The Supreme Court also stated that the proposed ban on political dynasties must be extended to up to the fourth civil degree of familial and spousal relations.

== Seat ==
Locations of the historical (blue) and current (red) seats of Congress in Metro Manila.

The two houses of Congress meet at different places in Metro Manila, the seat of government: the Senate meets at the GSIS Building, the main office of the Government Service Insurance System (GSIS) in Pasay, while the House of Representatives sits at the Batasang Pambansa Complex in Quezon City. The two are around 25 kilometers (16 mi) apart.

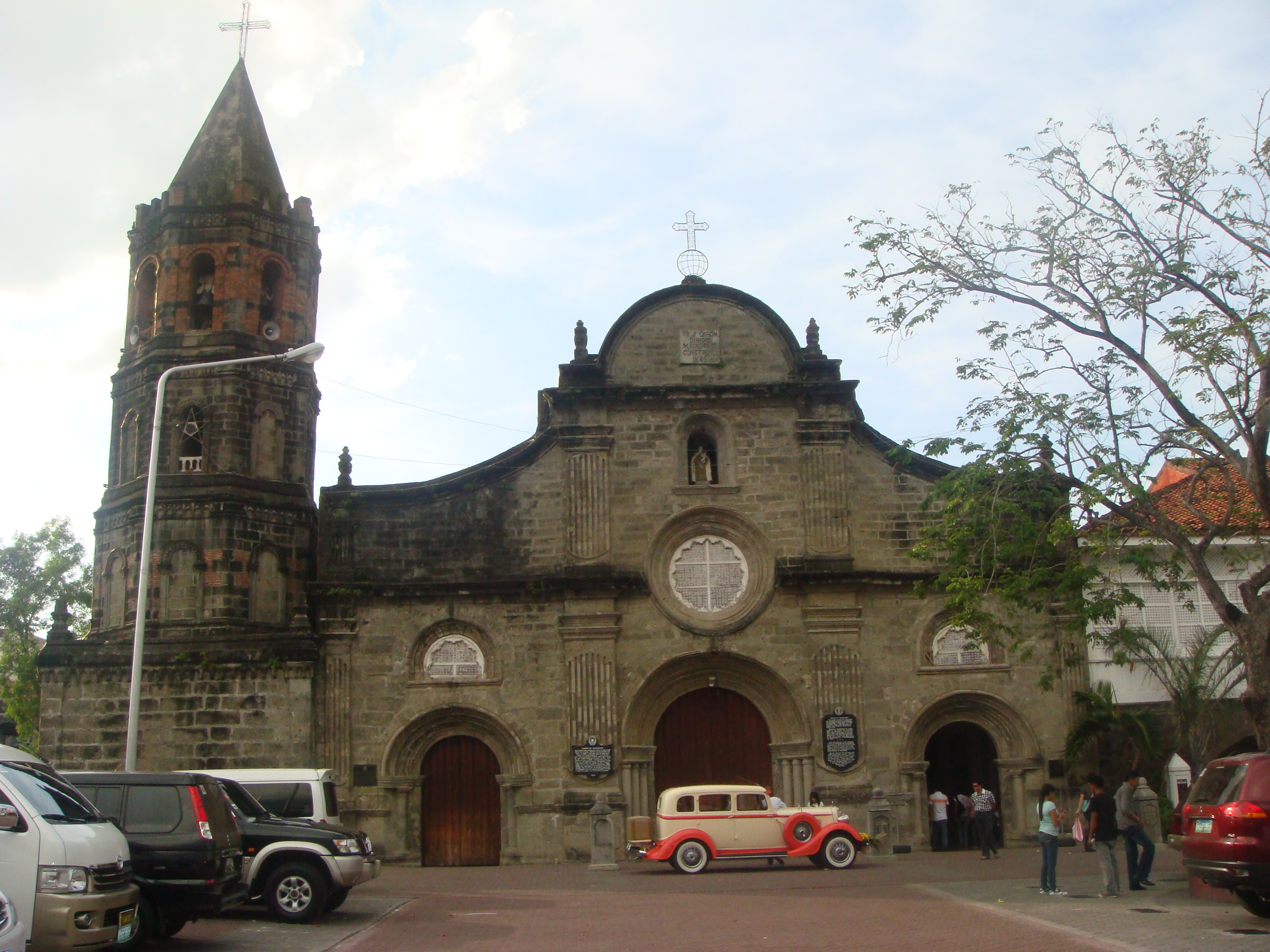
Barasoain Church

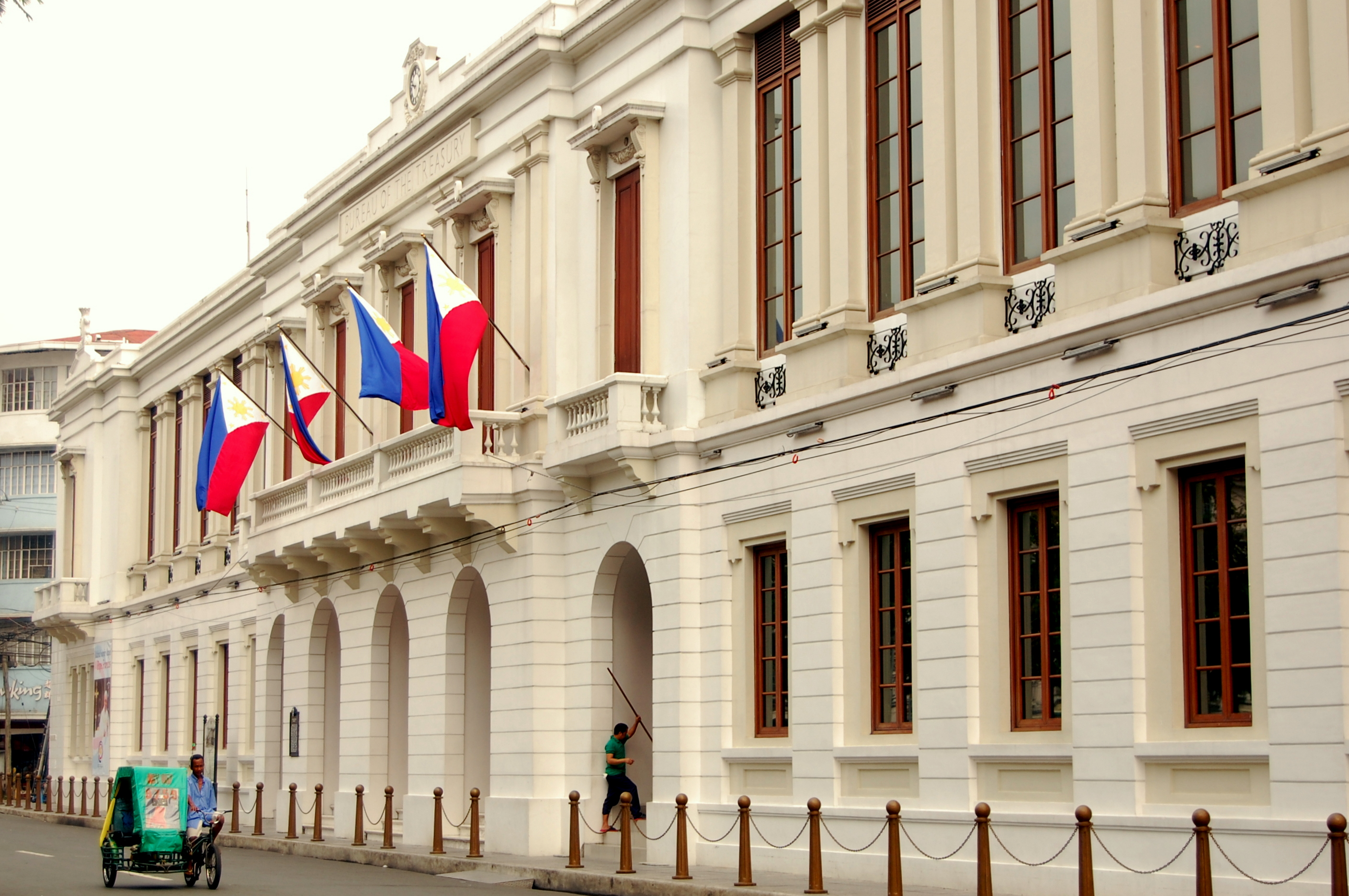
Ayuntamiento de Manila

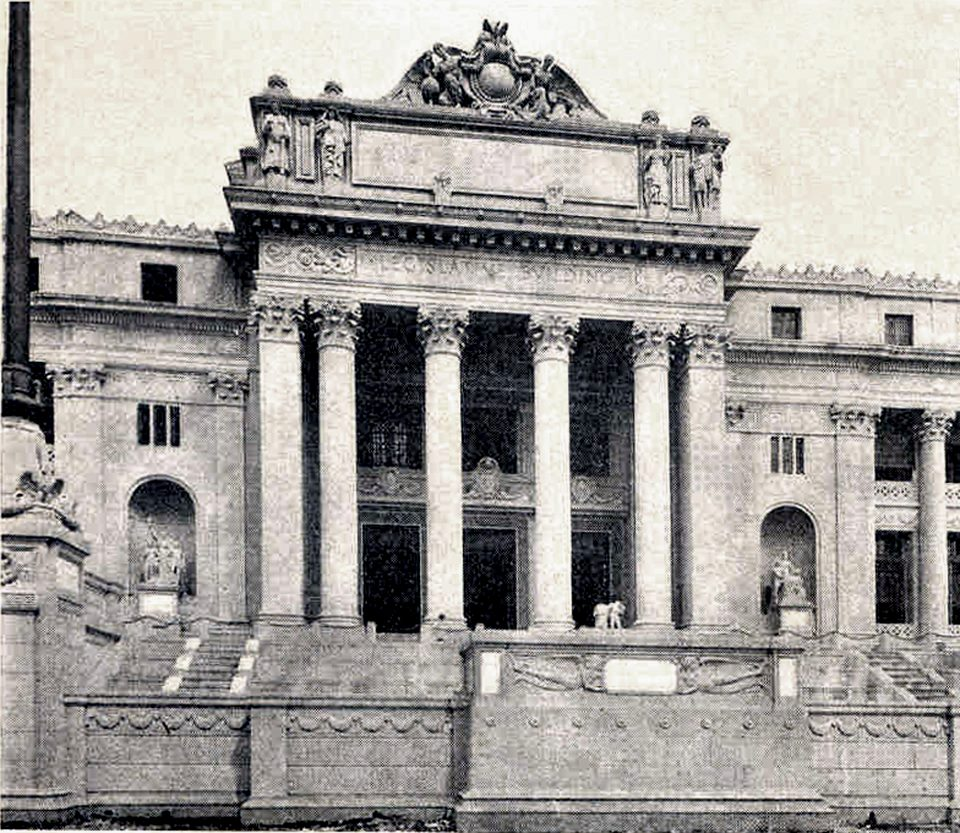
Old Legislative Building

The Barasoain Church in Malolos, Bulacan served as a meeting place of unicameral congress of the First Philippine Republic.

After the Americans defeated the First Republic, the US-instituted Philippine Legislature convened at the Ayuntamiento in Intramuros, Manila from 1907 until 1926, when it transferred to the Legislative Building just outside Intramuros. In the Legislative Building, the Senate occupied the upper floors while the House of Representatives used the lower floors.

With the Legislative Building destroyed during the Battle of Manila of 1945, the Commonwealth Congress convened at the Old Japanese Schoolhouse in Sampaloc. Congress met at the school auditorium, with the Senate convening on evenings and the House of Representatives meeting every morning. The Senate subsequently moved to the Manila City Hall, with the House staying in the schoolhouse. The two chambers of Congress returned to the reconstructed Legislative Building, now the Congress Building in 1950. In 1973, when President Marcos ruled by decree, Congress was padlocked. Marcos built a new seat of a unicameral parliament in Quezon City, which would eventually be the Batasang Pambansa Complex. The parliament that will eventually be named as the Batasang Pambansa (National Legislature), first met at the Batasang Pambansa Complex in 1978.

With the overthrow of Marcos after the People Power Revolution, the bicameral Congress was restored. The House of Representatives inherited the Batasang Pambansa Complex, while the Senate returned to the Congress Building. In May 1997, the Senate moved to the newly constructed building owned by the GSIS on land reclaimed from Manila Bay in Pasay; the Congress Building was eventually transformed into the National Museum of Fine Arts. The Senate will eventually move into a new building that they would own in Fort Bonifacio, Taguig.

== Powers ==
Commission on Appointments

Bicameral Conference Committee

The powers of the Congress of the Philippines may be classified as:

General Legislative
It consists of the enactment of laws intended as a rule of conduct to govern the relation between individuals (i.e., civil laws, commercial laws, etc.) or between individuals and the state (i.e., criminal law, political law, etc.)
Implied Powers
It is essential to the effective exercise of other powers expressly granted to the assembly.
Inherent Powers
These are the powers which although not expressly given are nevertheless exercised by the Congress as they are necessary for its existence such as:
- to determine the rules of proceedings;
- to compel attendance of absent members to obtain quorum to do business;
- to keep journal of its proceedings; etc.
Specific Legislative
It has reference to powers which the Constitution expressly and specifically directs to perform or execute.
Powers enjoyed by the Congress classifiable under this category are:
- Power to appropriate;
- Power to act as a constituent assembly (for drafting an amendment to the constitution upon a vote of three-fourths of all its members);
- Power to impeach (the House of Representatives initiates all cases of impeachment, and successful cases are referred to the Senate for trial; officials convicted by the Senate are removed from office);
- Power to confirm treaties (only the Senate is authorized to use this power);
- Power to declare the existence of war (The Senate and the House of Representatives must convene in joint session to do this);
- Power to concur amnesty;
- Power to act as a board of canvassers for presidential/vice-presidential votes (by creating a joint congressional committee to do the canvassing);
- Budgetary power;
- Power to implement taxes.
Executive
Powers of the Congress that are executive in nature are:
- Appointment of its officers;
- Affirming treaties;
- Confirming presidential appointees through the Commission on Appointments;
- Removal power; etc.
Supervisory
The Congress of the Philippines exercises considerable control and supervision over the administrative branch - e.g.:
- To decide the creation of a department/agency/office;
- To define powers and duties of officers;
- To appropriate funds for governmental operations;
- To prescribe rules and procedure to be followed; etc.
Electoral
Considered as electoral power of the Congress of the Philippines are the Congress's power to:
- Elect its presiding officer/s and other officers of the House;
- Act as board of canvassers for the canvass of presidential/vice-presidential votes; and
- Elect the President in case of any electoral tie to the said post.
Judicial
Constitutionally, each house has judicial powers:
- To punish its Members for disorderly behavior, and, with the concurrence of two-thirds of all its Members, suspend or expel a Member
- To concur and approve amnesty declared by the President of the Philippines;
- To initiate, prosecute and thereafter decide cases of impeachment; and
- To decide electoral protests of its members through the respective Electoral Tribunal.
Miscellaneous
The other powers of Congress mandated by the Constitution are as follows:
- To authorize the Commission on Audit to audit fund and property;
- To authorize the President of the Philippines to fix tariff rates, quotas, and dues;
- To authorize the President of the Philippines to formulate rules and regulations in times of emergency;
- To reapportion legislative districts based on established constitutional standards;
- To implement laws on autonomy;
- To establish a national language commission;
- To implement free public secondary education;
- To allow small scale use of natural resources;
- To specify the limits of forest lands and national parks;
- To determine the ownership and extent of ancestral domain; and
- To establish independent economic and planning agency.

.

- Preparation of the bill

The Member or the Bill Drafting Division of the Reference and Research Bureau prepares and drafts the bill upon the Member's request.

- First reading
  1. The bill is filed with the Bills and Index Service and the same is numbered and reproduced.
  2. Three days after its filing, the same is included in the Order of Business for First Reading.
  3. On First Reading, the Secretary General reads the title and number of the bill. The Speaker refers the bill to the appropriate Committee/s.
- Committee consideration / action
  1. The Committee where the bill was referred to evaluates it to determine the necessity of conducting public hearings.
  - If the Committee finds it necessary to conduct public hearings, it schedules the time thereof, issues public notices and invites resource persons from the public and private sectors, the academe, and experts on the proposed legislation.
  - If the Committee determines that public hearing is not needed, it schedules the bill for Committee discussion/s.
  1. Based on the result of the public hearings or Committee discussions, the Committee may introduce amendments, consolidate bills on the same subject matter, or propose a substitute bill. It then prepares the corresponding committee report.
  2. The Committee approves the Committee Report and formally transmits the same to the Plenary Affairs Bureau.
- Second reading
  1. The Committee Report is registered and numbered by the Bills and Index Service. It is included in the Order of Business and referred to the Committee on Rules.
  2. The Committee on Rules schedules the bill for consideration on Second Reading.
  3. On Second Reading, the Secretary General reads the number, title and text of the bill and the following takes place:
  - Period of Sponsorship and Debate
  - Period of Amendments
  - Voting, which may be by
  1. viva voce
  2. count by tellers
  3. division of the House
  4. nominal voting
- Third reading
  1. The amendments, if any, are engrossed and printed copies of the bill are reproduced for Third Reading.
  2. The engrossed bill is included in the Calendar of Bills for Third Reading and copies of the same are distributed to all the Members three days before its Third Reading.
  3. On Third Reading, the Secretary General reads only the number and title of the bill.
  4. A roll call or nominal voting is called and a Member, if he desires, is given three minutes to explain his vote. No amendment on the bill is allowed at this stage.
  - The bill is approved by an affirmative vote of a majority of the Members present.
  - If the bill is disapproved, the same is transmitted to the Archives.
- Transmittal of the approved bill to the Senate
  The approved bill is transmitted to the Senate for its concurrence.
- Senate action on approved bill of the House
  The bill undergoes the same legislative process in the Senate.
- Conference committee
  1. A Conference Committee is constituted and is composed of Members from each House of Congress to settle, reconcile or thresh out differences or disagreements on any provision of the bill.
  2. The conferees are not limited to reconciling the differences in the bill but may introduce new provisions germane to the subject matter or may report out an entirely new bill on the subject.
  3. The Conference Committee prepares a report to be signed by all the conferees and the chairman.
  4. The Conference Committee Report is submitted for consideration/approval of both Houses. No amendment is allowed.
- Transmittal of the bill to the President
  Copies of the bill, signed by the Senate President and the Speaker of the House of Representatives and certified by both the Secretary of the Senate and the Secretary General of the House, are transmitted to the President.
- Presidential action on the bill
  If the bill is approved by the President, it is assigned an RA number and transmitted to the House where it originated.
- Action on approved bill
  The bill is reproduced and copies are sent to the Official Gazette Office for publication and distribution to the implementing agencies. It is then included in the annual compilation of Acts and Resolutions.
- Action on vetoed bill
  The message is included in the Order of Business. If the Congress decides to override the veto, the House and the Senate shall proceed separately to reconsider the bill or the vetoed items of the bill. If the bill or its vetoed items is passed by a vote of two-thirds of the Members of each House, such bill or items shall become a law.

== Composition ==
In the diagrams below, Congress is divided into blocs, with the colors referring to the political party of the person leading that bloc. The blocs are determined by the votes of the members in speakership or Senate presidential elections.

The Senate is composed of the winners of the 2022 and 2025 Senate elections. The House of Representatives is composed of the winners of the 2025 House of Representatives elections. In both chambers, the majority bloc is composed of members generally supportive of the incumbent presidency of Bongbong Marcos, while the minority blocs are those opposed. In the House of Representatives, there is an independent minority bloc, and 4 vacant seats.

In both chambers, membership in committees is determined by the size of the bloc; only members of the majority and minority blocs are given committee memberships. In the Philippines, political parties are liquid, and it is not uncommon for party-mates to find themselves in different blocs.

=== Leadership ===
Each chamber is headed by a presiding officer, both elected from their respective membership; in the Senate, it is the Senate President, while in the House of Representatives, it is the Speaker. The Senate also has a Senate president pro tempore, and the House of Representatives has deputy speakers. Each chamber has its own floor leaders.

== Voting requirements ==
The vote requirements in the Congress of the Philippines are as follows:

| Requirement | Senate | House of Representatives | Joint session | All members |
|---|---|---|---|---|
| One-fifth | Request of recording of yeas and nays on any question | | N/A | N/A |
| One-third | N/A | Pass articles of impeachment | N/A | N/A |
| Majority (50% +1 member) | Election of the Senate President | Election of the Speaker | Revocation of martial law; Revocation of the suspension of the privilege of the writ of habeas corpus | Submit to the electorate the question of calling a constitutional convention; Grant a tax exemption; Concurrence of a grant of amnesty |
| Majority (50% +1 member) | Passage of laws; Election of the president in case of a tie vote.; Confirmation of an appointment of the president to a vice president | | Revocation of martial law; Revocation of the suspension of the privilege of the writ of habeas corpus | Submit to the electorate the question of calling a constitutional convention; Grant a tax exemption; Concurrence of a grant of amnesty |
| Two-thirds | Suspend or expel a member; Designation of the vice president as acting president; Override a presidential veto | | Declaration of a state of war (voting separately) | Call a constitutional convention |
| Two-thirds | Conviction of impeached officials; Concurrence on a treaty | N/A | Declaration of a state of war (voting separately) | Call a constitutional convention |
| Three-fourths | N/A | N/A | N/A | Passage of amendments to, or revision of the constitution |

In most cases, such as the approval of bills, only a majority of members present is needed; on some cases such as the election of presiding officers, a majority of all members, including vacant seats, is needed.

== Sessions ==
A new session of Congress starts after every House of Representatives election. Under the 1935 Constitution as amended in 1940, mid-term elections for the Senate caused its membership to be changed mid-session. From 1945 to 1972, there were two Commonwealth congresses and seven congresses of the Republic, with the 2nd Commonwealth Congress becoming the 1st Congress of the Republic. Under the 1973 Constitution, the Batasang Pambansa was the legislature, with it having two elections. Under the 1987 constitution, each Senate election was synchronized with the House elections, with the first congress under that constitution being counted as the "8th Congress", picking up from the last congress of the 1935 Constitution.

=== Per historical era ===
| In operation | Authority | Government | Legislature | Type | Upper house | Lower house |
|---|---|---|---|---|---|---|
| 1898–99 | Malolos Constitution | First Philippine Republic controlled areas | Malolos Congress | Unicameral | Malolos Congress | |
| 1898–99 | War powers authority of the President of the United States | United States Military Government controlled areas | Martial law; military governor ruled by decree | | | |
| 1900–1902 | Malolos Constitution | First Philippine Republic controlled areas | Malolos Congress | Unicameral | Malolos Congress | |
| 1900–1902 | Appointment by the President of the United States | United States Military Government controlled areas | Taft Commission | Unicameral | Philippine Commission | |
| 1902–1907 | Philippine Organic Act | Insular Government of the Philippine Islands | Philippine Commission | Unicameral | Philippine Commission | |
| 1907–1916 | Philippine Organic Act | Insular Government of the Philippine Islands | Philippine Legislature | Bicameral | Philippine Commission | Philippine Assembly |
| 1916–1935 | Philippine Autonomy Act | Insular Government of the Philippine Islands | Philippine Legislature | Bicameral | Senate | House of Representatives |
| 1935–1941 | 1935 Constitution | Commonwealth of the Philippines | National Assembly | Unicameral | National Assembly | |
| 1942–43 | War powers authority of the Emperor of Japan | Empire of Japan | Martial law; governor-general ruled by decree | | | |
| 1943–44 | 1943 Constitution | Second Philippine Republic | National Assembly | Unicameral | National Assembly | |
| 1945–46 | Amendments to the 1935 Constitution | Commonwealth of the Philippines | Congress (Commonwealth) | Bicameral | Senate | House of Representatives |
| 1946–1973 | Amendments to the 1935 Constitution | Third Republic of the Philippines | Congress | Bicameral | Senate | House of Representatives |
| 1973–1976 | 1973 Constitution | Philippines under Martial Law | Martial law; president ruled by decree | | | |
| 1976–1978 (never convened) | 1973 Constitution | Philippines under Martial Law | Batasang Bayan | Unicameral | National Assembly | |
| 1978–1986 | Amendments to the 1973 Constitution | Fourth Republic of the Philippines | Batasang Pambansa | Unicameral | Batasang Pambansa | |
| 1986–1987 | Amendments to the 1973 Constitution | Provisional Government | President ruled by decree | | | |
| 1987–present | 1987 Constitution | Fifth Republic of the Philippines | Congress | Bicameral | Senate | House of Representatives |

=== List of congresses ===
| Election | Congress | Senate election results | House of Representatives elections results |
|---|---|---|---|
| Pre-1941 | See Philippine Legislature and National Assembly of the Philippines | | |
| 1941 | 1st Commonwealth Congress | 24 Nacionalista | 95 Nacionalista; 3 independent |
| 1946 | 2nd Commonwealth Congress | 9 Nacionalista (Liberal wing); 6 Nacionalista; 1 Popular Front | 49 Nacionalista (Liberal wing); 35 Nacionalista; 6 Democratic Alliance; 3 others |
| 1946 | 1st Congress | 9 Nacionalista (Liberal wing); 6 Nacionalista; 1 Popular Front | 49 Nacionalista (Liberal wing); 35 Nacionalista; 6 Democratic Alliance; 3 others |
| 1947 | 1st Congress | 6 Liberal; 2 Nacionalista | 49 Nacionalista (Liberal wing); 35 Nacionalista; 6 Democratic Alliance; 3 others |
| 1949 | 2nd Congress | 8 Liberal | 60 Liberal; 33 Nacionalista; 7 others |
| 1951 | 2nd Congress | 8 Nacionalista | 60 Liberal; 33 Nacionalista; 7 others |
| 1953 | 3rd Congress | 5 Nacionalista; 2 Democratic; 1 Citizens' | 59 Nacionalista; 31 Liberal; 11 Democratic; 1 independent |
| 1955 | 3rd Congress | 9 Nacionalista | 59 Nacionalista; 31 Liberal; 11 Democratic; 1 independent |
| 1957 | 4th Congress | 6 Nacionalista; 2 Liberal | 82 Nacionalista; 19 Liberal; 1 NCP |
| 1959 | 4th Congress | 5 Nacionalista; 2 Liberal; 1 NCP | 82 Nacionalista; 19 Liberal; 1 NCP |
| 1961 | 5th Congress | 4 Liberal; 2 Nacionalista; 2 Progressive | 74 Nacionalista; 29 Liberal; 1 independent |
| 1963 | 5th Congress | 4 Liberal; 4 Nacionalista | 74 Nacionalista; 29 Liberal; 1 independent |
| 1965 | 6th Congress | 5 Nacionalista; 2 Liberal; 1 NCP | 61 Liberal; 38 Nacionalista; 5 others |
| 1967 | 6th Congress | 6 Nacionalista; 1 Liberal; 1 independent | 61 Liberal; 38 Nacionalista; 5 others |
| 1969 | 7th Congress | 6 Nacionalista; 2 Liberal | 88 Nacionalista; 18 Liberal; 4 others |
| 1971 | 7th Congress | 5 Liberal; 3 Nacionalista | 88 Nacionalista; 18 Liberal; 4 others |
| 1978, 1984 | See Batasang Pambansa | | |
| 1987 | 8th Congress | 22 LABAN; 2 GAD | 43 PDP–Laban; 24 Lakas ng Bansa; 19 UNIDO; 16 Liberal; 11 KBL; 55 coalitions 32 others 14 appointed sectoral seats |
| 1992 | 9th Congress | 16 LDP; 5 NPC; 2 Lakas; 1 Liberal | 86 LDP; 41 Lakas; 30 NPC; 11 LP-PDP; 32 others 16 appointed sectoral seats |
| 1995 | 10th Congress | 4 Lakas; 4 LDP; 1 Nacionalista; 1 NPC; 1 PRP; 1 independent | 157 pro-administration coalition 26 opposition coalition 12 hybrid coalitions 9 others 16 appointed sectoral seats |
| 1998 | 11th Congress | 5 Lakas; 4 LDP; 1 NPC; 1 PMP; 1 PDP–Laban | 111 Lakas; 55 LAMMP; 15 Liberal; 25 others 14 party-lists |
| 2001 | 12th Congress | 3 Lakas; 2 LDP; 1 Liberal; 1 PDP–Laban; 6 independent | 79 Lakas; 42 NPC; 21 LDP; 19 Liberal; 48 others 16 party-lists |
| 2004 | 13th Congress | 5 KNP; 4 Lakas; 2 Liberal; 1 PRP | 92 Lakas; 53 NPC; 29 Liberal; 15 LDP; 20 others 28 party-lists |
| 2007 | 14th Congress | 2 Liberal; 2 Nacionalista; 2 NPC; 2 UNO; 1 KAMPI; 1 LDP; 1 PDP–Laban; 1 independent | 89 Lakas; 44 KAMPI; 28 NPC; 23 Liberal; 11 Nacionalista; 23 others 53 party-lists |
| 2010 | 15th Congress | 3 Liberal; 2 Lakas–Kampi; 2 Nacionalista; 2 PMP; 1 NPC; 1 PRP; 1 independent | 106 Lakas–Kampi; 47 Liberal; 29 NPC; 25 Nacionalista; 22 others 57 party-lists |
| 2013 | 16th Congress | 3 Nacionalista; 3 UNA; 1 LDP; 1 Liberal; 1 NPC; 1 PDP–Laban | 109 Liberal; 42 NPC; 24 NUP; 18 Nacionalista; 14 Lakas; 27 others 59 party-lists |
| 2016 | 17th Congress | 5 Liberal; 2 NPC; 1 Akbayan; 1 UNA; 3 independent | 115 Liberal; 42 NPC; 24 Nacionalista; 23 NUP; 11 UNA; 23 others 59 party-lists |
| 2019 | 18th Congress | 4 PDP–Laban; 3 Nacionalista; 1 Lakas; 1 LDP; 1 NPC; 1 UNA; 1 independent | 82 PDP–Laban; 42 Nacionalista; 37 NPC; 23 NUP; 18 Liberal; 12 Lakas; 27 others 61 party-lists |
| 2022 | 19th Congress | 4 NPC; 1 PDP-Laban; 1 Nacionalista; 1 Akbayan; 1 PMP; 4 independent | 66 PDP–Laban; 36 Nacionalista; 35 NPC; 33 NUP; 26 Lakas; 10 Liberal; 47 others 62 party-lists |
| 2025 | 20th Congress | 3 Nacionalista; 2 PDP; 2 NPC; 1 KANP; 1 Lakas; 1 Liberal; 2 independent | 103 Lakas; 32 NUP; 31 NPC; 27 PFP; 22 Nacionalista; 39 others 63 party-lists |

== Latest elections ==
=== Senate ===
In the Philippines, the most common way to illustrate the result in a Senate election is via a tally of candidates in descending order of votes. The twelve candidates with the highest number of votes are elected.

| Candidate | Party or alliance | | Votes | % |
|---|---|---|---|---|
| Bong Go | DuterTen | PDP–Laban | 27,121,073 | 47.29 |
| Bam Aquino | KiBam | Katipunan ng Nagkakaisang Pilipino | 20,971,899 | 36.57 |
| Ronald dela Rosa | DuterTen | PDP–Laban | 20,773,946 | 36.22 |
| Erwin Tulfo | Alyansa para sa Bagong Pilipinas | Lakas–CMD | 17,118,881 | 29.85 |
| Kiko Pangilinan | KiBam | Liberal Party | 15,343,229 | 26.75 |
| Rodante Marcoleta | DuterTen | Independent | 15,250,723 | 26.59 |
| Panfilo Lacson | Alyansa para sa Bagong Pilipinas | Independent | 15,106,111 | 26.34 |
| Tito Sotto | Alyansa para sa Bagong Pilipinas | Nationalist People's Coalition | 14,832,996 | 25.86 |
| Pia Cayetano | Alyansa para sa Bagong Pilipinas | Nacionalista Party | 14,573,430 | 25.41 |
| Camille Villar | Alyansa para sa Bagong Pilipinas (Note: Guest candidate of DuterTen) | Nacionalista Party | 13,651,274 | 23.80 |
| Lito Lapid | Alyansa para sa Bagong Pilipinas | Nationalist People's Coalition | 13,394,102 | 23.35 |
| Imee Marcos | Nacionalista Party | | 13,339,227 | 23.26 |
| Ben Tulfo | Independent | | 12,090,090 | 21.08 |
| Bong Revilla | Alyansa para sa Bagong Pilipinas | Lakas–CMD | 12,027,845 | 20.97 |
| Abigail Binay | Alyansa para sa Bagong Pilipinas | Nationalist People's Coalition | 11,808,645 | 20.59 |
| Benhur Abalos | Alyansa para sa Bagong Pilipinas | Partido Federal ng Pilipinas | 11,580,520 | 20.19 |
| Jimmy Bondoc | DuterTen | PDP–Laban | 10,615,598 | 18.51 |
| Manny Pacquiao | Alyansa para sa Bagong Pilipinas | Partido Federal ng Pilipinas | 10,397,133 | 18.13 |
| Phillip Salvador | DuterTen | PDP–Laban | 10,241,491 | 17.86 |
| Bonifacio Bosita | Riding-in-Tandem Team | Independent | 9,805,903 | 17.10 |
| Heidi Mendoza | Independent | | 8,759,732 | 15.27 |
| Willie Revillame | Independent | | 8,568,924 | 14.94 |
| Vic Rodriguez | DuterTen | Independent | 8,450,668 | 14.74 |
| Raul Lambino | DuterTen | PDP–Laban | 8,383,593 | 14.62 |
| Francis Tolentino | Alyansa para sa Bagong Pilipinas | Partido Federal ng Pilipinas | 7,702,550 | 13.43 |
| Jayvee Hinlo | DuterTen | PDP–Laban | 7,471,704 | 13.03 |
| Willie Ong (Note: Withdrew but remained on the ballot) | Aksyon Demokratiko | | 7,371,944 | 12.85 |
| Gregorio Honasan | Reform PH Party | | 6,700,772 | 11.68 |
| Luke Espiritu | Partido Lakas ng Masa | | 6,481,413 | 11.30 |
| Richard Mata | DuterTen | Independent | 5,789,181 | 10.09 |
| Apollo Quiboloy | DuterTen | Independent | 5,719,041 | 9.97 |
| Teodoro Casiño | Makabayan | | 4,648,271 | 8.10 |
| Arlene Brosas | Makabayan | | 4,343,773 | 7.57 |
| Leody de Guzman | Partido Lakas ng Masa | | 4,136,899 | 7.21 |
| Danilo Ramos | Makabayan | | 4,091,257 | 7.13 |
| Ariel Querubin | Riding-in-Tandem Team | Nacionalista Party | 3,950,051 | 6.89 |
| Liza Maza | Makabayan | | 3,927,784 | 6.85 |
| Sonny Matula | Workers' and Peasants' Party | | 3,865,792 | 6.74 |
| Ronnel Arambulo | Makabayan | | 3,846,216 | 6.71 |
| France Castro | Makabayan | | 3,670,972 | 6.40 |
| Angelo de Alban | Independent | | 2,556,983 | 4.46 |
| Roberto Ballon | Independent | | 2,389,847 | 4.17 |
| Norman Marquez | Independent | | 1,150,095 | 2.01 |
| Eric Martinez | Independent | | 1,032,201 | 1.80 |
| Norberto Gonzales | Partido Demokratiko Sosyalista ng Pilipinas | | 990,091 | 1.73 |
| Jocelyn Andamo | Makabayan | | 829,084 | 1.45 |
| Allen Capuyan | Partido Pilipino sa Pagbabago | | 818,437 | 1.43 |
| Ernesto Arellano | Katipunan ng Kamalayang Kayumanggi | | 801,677 | 1.40 |
| Jerome Adonis | Makabayan | | 779,868 | 1.36 |
| Mimi Doringo | Makabayan | | 744,506 | 1.30 |
| Arnel Escobal | Partido Maharlika | | 731,453 | 1.28 |
| Jose Montemayor Jr. | Independent | | 671,818 | 1.17 |
| Wilson Amad | Independent | | 618,943 | 1.08 |
| Mar Valbuena | Independent | | 611,432 | 1.07 |
| David D'Angelo | Bunyog Party | | 607,642 | 1.06 |
| Wilbert T. Lee | Aksyon Demokratiko | | 587,098 | 1.02 |
| Marc Gamboa | Aksyon Demokratiko | Independent | 571,637 | 1.00 |
| Amirah Lidasan | Makabayan | | 564,948 | 0.99 |
| Mody Floranda | Makabayan | | 554,385 | 0.97 |
| Nur-Ana Sahidulla | Independent | | 476,855 | 0.83 |
| Michael Tapado | Partido Maharlika | | 460,662 | 0.80 |
| Relly Jose Jr. | Kilusang Bagong Lipunan | | 458,383 | 0.80 |
| Jose Olivar | Independent | | 448,794 | 0.78 |
| Subair Mustapha | Workers' and Peasants' Party | | 414,027 | 0.72 |
| Roy Cabonegro | Democratic Party of the Philippines | | 383,534 | 0.67 |
| Leandro Verceles Jr. | Independent | | 310,562 | 0.54 |
| Total | | | 428,489,615 | 100.00 |
| Total votes | | | 57,350,958 | – |
| Registered voters/turnout | | | 69,673,655 | 82.31 |
Source: COMELEC

=== House of Representatives ===
A voter has two votes in the House of Representatives: one vote for a representative elected in the voter's congressional district (first-past-the-post), and one vote for a party in the party-list system (closed list), the so-called party-list representatives; party-list representatives shall comprise not more than 20% of the House of Representatives.

To determine the winning parties in the party-list election, a party must surpass the 2% election threshold of the national vote; usually, the party with the largest number of votes wins the maximum three seats, the rest two seats. If the number of seats of the parties that surpassed the 2% threshold is less than 20% of the total seats, the parties that won less than 2% of the vote gets one seat each until the 20% requirement is met.

==== District elections ====
| Party | Votes | % | +/– | Seats | +/– |
|---|---|---|---|---|---|
| Lakas–CMD | 16,596,698 | 32.87 | +23.70 | 103 | +77 |
| National Unity Party | 6,080,987 | 12.05 | +0.13 | 32 | −1 |
| Nationalist People's Coalition | 5,974,201 | 11.83 | −0.60 | 31 | −4 |
| Partido Federal ng Pilipinas | 5,286,538 | 10.47 | +9.53 | 27 | +25 |
| Nacionalista Party | 4,724,803 | 9.36 | −4.38 | 22 | −14 |
| Liberal Party | 1,555,941 | 3.08 | −0.70 | 6 | −4 |
| Aksyon Demokratiko | 1,341,540 | 2.66 | +0.72 | 2 | +2 |
| PDP–Laban | 666,067 | 1.32 | −21.45 | 2 | −64 |
| Hugpong sa Tawong Lungsod | 542,710 | 1.07 | +0.93 | 3 | +3 |
| Laban ng Demokratikong Pilipino | 314,981 | 0.62 | −0.16 | 2 | +1 |
| People's Reform Party | 292,665 | 0.58 | −1.38 | 1 | −2 |
| Pwersa ng Masang Pilipino | 269,949 | 0.53 | +0.52 | 2 | +2 |
| United Bangsamoro Justice Party | 236,857 | 0.47 | −0.14 | 0 | 0 |
| Unang Sigaw | 183,912 | 0.36 | −0.29 | 0 | 0 |
| Makatizens United Party | 150,189 | 0.30 | New | 2 | New |
| Sama Sama Tarlac | 143,868 | 0.28 | New | 0 | 0 |
| United Nationalist Alliance | 142,655 | 0.28 | +0.14 | 1 | 0 |
| Katipunan ng Nagkakaisang Pilipino | 134,137 | 0.27 | +0.26 | 0 | 0 |
| National Unity Party/United Negros Alliance | 130,023 | 0.26 | −0.27 | 1 | −1 |
| Centrist Democratic Party of the Philippines | 127,646 | 0.25 | −0.02 | 1 | 0 |
| Partido Navoteño | 116,622 | 0.23 | +0.06 | 1 | 0 |
| One Capiz | 109,249 | 0.22 | New | 0 | 0 |
| Reform PH Party | 107,966 | 0.21 | New | 0 | 0 |
| Lakas–CMD/One Cebu | 104,768 | 0.21 | New | 1 | New |
| Adelante Zamboanga Party | 100,035 | 0.20 | +0.05 | 1 | 0 |
| Padajon Surigao | 99,856 | 0.20 | New | 0 | 0 |
| Galing at Serbisyo para sa Mindoreño | 91,073 | 0.18 | New | 0 | 0 |
| Filipino Rights Protection Advocates of Manila Movement | 87,183 | 0.17 | New | 0 | 0 |
| Nationalist People's Coalition/One Cebu | 74,936 | 0.15 | New | 1 | New |
| Asenso Manileño | 70,780 | 0.14 | New | 1 | 0 |
| Akay National Political Party | 68,524 | 0.14 | New | 0 | 0 |
| Workers' and Peasants' Party | 50,618 | 0.10 | +0.00 | 0 | 0 |
| Kusog Bicolandia | 33,789 | 0.07 | New | 0 | 0 |
| Partido Lakas ng Masa | 28,746 | 0.06 | +0.05 | 0 | 0 |
| Asenso Abrenio | 23,308 | 0.05 | New | 0 | 0 |
| Makabayan | 22,698 | 0.04 | New | 0 | 0 |
| Partido Demokratiko Sosyalista ng Pilipinas | 14,343 | 0.03 | −0.13 | 0 | 0 |
| Partido para sa Demokratikong Reporma | 12,672 | 0.03 | −0.96 | 0 | 0 |
| Independent | 4,371,611 | 8.66 | +4.23 | 11 | +5 |
| Party-list seats | | | | 64 | +1 |
| Total | 50,485,144 | 100.00 | – | 318 | +1 |
| Valid votes | 50,485,144 | 88.46 | +1.48 | | |
| Invalid/blank votes | 6,585,150 | 11.54 | −1.48 | | |
| Total votes | 57,070,294 | 100.00 | – | | |
| Registered voters/turnout | 68,431,965 | 83.40 | −0.70 | | |
Source: COMELEC (results per district, registered voters)

==== Party-list election ====
| Party | Votes | % | Seats | +/– |
|---|---|---|---|---|
| Akbayan | 2,779,621 | 7.02 | 3 | +2 |
| Tingog Party List | 1,822,708 | 4.60 | 3 | +1 |
| 4Ps Partylist | 1,469,571 | 3.71 | 2 | 0 |
| ACT-CIS Partylist | 1,239,930 | 3.13 | 2 | −1 |
| Ako Bicol | 1,073,119 | 2.71 | 2 | 0 |
| Uswag Ilonggo | 777,754 | 1.96 | 1 | 0 |
| Solid North Party | 765,322 | 1.93 | 1 | New |
| Trabaho Partylist | 709,283 | 1.79 | 1 | +1 |
| Citizens' Battle Against Corruption | 593,911 | 1.50 | 1 | 0 |
| Malasakit at Bayanihan | 580,100 | 1.46 | 1 | 0 |
| Senior Citizens Partylist | 577,753 | 1.46 | 1 | 0 |
| Puwersa ng Pilipinong Pandagat | 575,762 | 1.45 | 1 | New |
| Mamamayang Liberal | 547,949 | 1.38 | 1 | New |
| FPJ Panday Bayanihan | 538,003 | 1.36 | 1 | New |
| United Senior Citizens Partylist | 533,913 | 1.35 | 1 | 0 |
| 4K Partylist | 521,592 | 1.32 | 1 | New |
| LPG Marketers Association | 517,833 | 1.31 | 1 | 0 |
| Coop-NATCCO | 509,913 | 1.29 | 1 | 0 |
| Ako Bisaya | 477,796 | 1.21 | 1 | 0 |
| Construction Workers Solidarity | 477,517 | 1.21 | 1 | 0 |
| Pinoy Workers Partylist | 475,985 | 1.20 | 1 | New |
| AGAP Partylist | 469,412 | 1.19 | 1 | 0 |
| Asenso Pinoy | 423,133 | 1.07 | 1 | +1 |
| Agimat Partylist | 420,813 | 1.06 | 1 | 0 |
| TGP Partylist | 407,922 | 1.03 | 1 | 0 |
| SAGIP Partylist | 405,297 | 1.02 | 1 | −1 |
| Alona Partylist | 393,684 | 0.99 | 1 | 0 |
| 1-Rider Partylist | 385,700 | 0.97 | 1 | −1 |
| Kamanggagawa | 382,657 | 0.97 | 1 | New |
| Galing sa Puso Party | 381,880 | 0.96 | 1 | 0 |
| Kamalayan | 381,437 | 0.96 | 1 | +1 |
| Bicol Saro | 366,177 | 0.92 | 1 | 0 |
| Kusug Tausug | 365,916 | 0.92 | 1 | 0 |
| Alliance of Concerned Teachers | 353,631 | 0.89 | 1 | 0 |
| One Coop | 334,098 | 0.84 | 1 | +1 |
| KM Ngayon Na | 324,405 | 0.82 | 1 | +1 |
| Abante Mindanao | 320,349 | 0.81 | 1 | New |
| Bagong Henerasyon | 319,803 | 0.81 | 1 | 0 |
| Trade Union Congress Party | 314,814 | 0.79 | 1 | 0 |
| Kabataan | 312,344 | 0.79 | 1 | 0 |
| APEC Partylist | 310,427 | 0.78 | 1 | 0 |
| Magbubukid | 310,289 | 0.78 | 1 | New |
| 1Tahanan | 309,761 | 0.78 | 1 | +1 |
| Ako Ilocano Ako | 301,406 | 0.76 | 1 | 0 |
| Manila Teachers Party-List | 301,291 | 0.76 | 1 | 0 |
| Nanay Partylist | 293,430 | 0.74 | 1 | New |
| Kapuso PM | 293,149 | 0.74 | 1 | New |
| SSS-GSIS Pensyonado | 290,359 | 0.73 | 1 | New |
| DUMPER Partylist | 279,532 | 0.71 | 1 | 0 |
| Abang Lingkod | 274,735 | 0.69 | 1 | 0 |
| Pusong Pinoy | 266,623 | 0.67 | 1 | 0 |
| Swerte | 261,379 | 0.66 | 1 | New |
| Philreca Party-List | 261,045 | 0.66 | 1 | 0 |
| Gabriela Women's Party (Note: Proclaimed as winner on September 17, 2025 by virtue of the COMELEC declaring a 64th seat being up) | 256,811 | 0.65 | 1 | 0 |
| Abono Partylist (Note: Proclaimed as winner on October 2, 2025 by virtue of Duterte Youth's disqualification) | 254,474 | 0.64 | 1 | 0 |
| Ang Probinsyano Party-list | 250,886 | 0.63 | 1 | 0 |
| Murang Kuryente Partylist | 247,754 | 0.63 | 1 | New |
| OFW Partylist | 246,609 | 0.62 | 0 | −1 |
| Apat-Dapat | 245,060 | 0.62 | 0 | 0 |
| Tupad | 243,152 | 0.61 | 0 | 0 |
| Kalinga Partylist | 235,186 | 0.59 | 0 | 0 |
| 1-Pacman Party List | 233,096 | 0.59 | 0 | −1 |
| ANGAT Partylist | 229,707 | 0.58 | 0 | −1 |
| Magsasaka Partylist | 225,371 | 0.57 | 0 | −1 |
| P3PWD | 214,605 | 0.54 | 0 | −1 |
| Barangay Health Wellness Partylist | 203,719 | 0.51 | 0 | −1 |
| Democratic Independent Workers Association | 195,829 | 0.49 | 0 | 0 |
| Epanaw Sambayanan | 188,505 | 0.48 | 0 | 0 |
| Probinsyano Ako | 185,606 | 0.47 | 0 | −1 |
| Toda Aksyon | 183,111 | 0.46 | 0 | 0 |
| Pinuno Partylist | 181,066 | 0.46 | 0 | −1 |
| Serbisyo sa Bayan Party | 175,520 | 0.44 | 0 | 0 |
| Abante Pangasinan-Ilokano Party | 170,795 | 0.43 | 0 | −1 |
| AGRI Partylist | 168,032 | 0.42 | 0 | −1 |
| Asap Na | 164,030 | 0.41 | 0 | 0 |
| Bayan Muna | 162,894 | 0.41 | 0 | 0 |
| Eduaksyon | 161,517 | 0.41 | 0 | 0 |
| Akay ni Sol | 159,748 | 0.40 | 0 | 0 |
| Ahon Mahirap | 157,991 | 0.40 | 0 | 0 |
| 1Munti Partylist | 157,665 | 0.40 | 0 | 0 |
| H.E.L.P. Pilipinas | 157,308 | 0.40 | 0 | 0 |
| A Teacher Partylist | 157,116 | 0.40 | 0 | 0 |
| Babae Ako | 157,041 | 0.40 | 0 | 0 |
| Anakalusugan | 154,121 | 0.39 | 0 | −1 |
| Pilipinas Babangon Muli | 154,025 | 0.39 | 0 | 0 |
| Batang Quiapo Partylist | 153,637 | 0.39 | 0 | 0 |
| Lunas | 151,494 | 0.38 | 0 | 0 |
| Kabalikat ng Mamamayan | 141,847 | 0.36 | 0 | −1 |
| WIFI | 141,041 | 0.36 | 0 | 0 |
| Aangat Tayo | 140,597 | 0.35 | 0 | 0 |
| Laang Kawal | 136,484 | 0.34 | 0 | 0 |
| Ako Padayon | 134,292 | 0.34 | 0 | 0 |
| Solo Parents | 131,659 | 0.33 | 0 | 0 |
| Pamilya Ko | 124,228 | 0.31 | 0 | 0 |
| Pamilyang Magsasaka | 117,440 | 0.30 | 0 | 0 |
| ANGKASANGGA | 115,720 | 0.29 | 0 | 0 |
| Kasambahay | 111,269 | 0.28 | 0 | 0 |
| Bangon Bagong Minero | 111,174 | 0.28 | 0 | 0 |
| Pamilya Muna | 108,483 | 0.27 | 0 | 0 |
| Kababaihan | 107,848 | 0.27 | 0 | 0 |
| AA-Kasosyo Party | 107,262 | 0.27 | 0 | 0 |
| Tulungan Tayo | 106,504 | 0.27 | 0 | 0 |
| Health Workers | 105,512 | 0.27 | 0 | 0 |
| 1Agila | 104,868 | 0.26 | 0 | 0 |
| Boses Party-List | 102,588 | 0.26 | 0 | 0 |
| Buhay Party-List | 99,365 | 0.25 | 0 | 0 |
| Ipatupad For Workers | 96,735 | 0.24 | 0 | 0 |
| Gilas | 96,646 | 0.24 | 0 | 0 |
| Bunyog Party | 93,825 | 0.24 | 0 | 0 |
| Vendors Partylist | 88,845 | 0.22 | 0 | 0 |
| Bayaning Tsuper | 84,204 | 0.21 | 0 | 0 |
| Bisaya Gyud Party-List | 79,915 | 0.20 | 0 | 0 |
| Magdalo Party-List | 78,984 | 0.20 | 0 | 0 |
| Maharlikang Pilipino Party | 78,700 | 0.20 | 0 | 0 |
| Arangkada Pilipino | 75,493 | 0.19 | 0 | 0 |
| Bagong Maunlad na Pilipinas | 70,595 | 0.18 | 0 | 0 |
| Damayang Filipino | 68,480 | 0.17 | 0 | 0 |
| Partido sa Bagong Pilipino | 68,085 | 0.17 | 0 | 0 |
| Heal PH | 67,085 | 0.17 | 0 | 0 |
| Ang Tinig ng Seniors | 66,553 | 0.17 | 0 | 0 |
| Ako OFW | 60,230 | 0.15 | 0 | 0 |
| Aksyon Dapat | 58,916 | 0.15 | 0 | 0 |
| Aktibong Kaagapay | 55,829 | 0.14 | 0 | 0 |
| UGB Partylist | 53,633 | 0.14 | 0 | 0 |
| Ang Komadrona | 53,017 | 0.13 | 0 | 0 |
| United Frontliners | 52,338 | 0.13 | 0 | 0 |
| Gabay | 52,109 | 0.13 | 0 | 0 |
| Tictok | 51,354 | 0.13 | 0 | 0 |
| Ako Tanod | 49,553 | 0.13 | 0 | 0 |
| Barangay Natin | 49,364 | 0.12 | 0 | 0 |
| Abante Bisdak | 49,114 | 0.12 | 0 | 0 |
| Turismo | 47,645 | 0.12 | 0 | 0 |
| Ang Bumbero ng Pilipinas | 47,027 | 0.12 | 0 | 0 |
| BFF | 45,816 | 0.12 | 0 | 0 |
| Pinoy Ako | 44,419 | 0.11 | 0 | 0 |
| Patrol Partylist | 41,570 | 0.10 | 0 | −1 |
| Tutok To Win Party-List | 41,036 | 0.10 | 0 | −1 |
| Lingap | 38,564 | 0.10 | 0 | 0 |
| Maagap | 35,871 | 0.09 | 0 | 0 |
| PBA Partylist | 35,078 | 0.09 | 0 | −1 |
| Ilocano Defenders | 32,028 | 0.08 | 0 | 0 |
| Pamana | 31,526 | 0.08 | 0 | 0 |
| Kaunlad Pinoy | 30,898 | 0.08 | 0 | 0 |
| Juan Pinoy | 27,523 | 0.07 | 0 | 0 |
| Rebolusyonaryong Alyansang Makabansa | 26,771 | 0.07 | 0 | 0 |
| Arise | 26,565 | 0.07 | 0 | 0 |
| Click Party | 25,914 | 0.07 | 0 | 0 |
| MPBL Partylist | 23,189 | 0.06 | 0 | 0 |
| PROMDI | 23,144 | 0.06 | 0 | 0 |
| Bida Katagumpay | 20,885 | 0.05 | 0 | 0 |
| Hugpong Federal | 19,028 | 0.05 | 0 | 0 |
| Arte | 14,169 | 0.04 | 0 | 0 |
| Peoples Champ Guardians Partylist | 11,492 | 0.03 | 0 | 0 |
| Sulong Dignidad | 8,120 | 0.02 | 0 | 0 |
| Total | 39,611,775 | 100.00 | 64 | +1 |
| Valid votes | 39,611,775 | 69.07 | +3.62 | |
| Invalid/blank votes (Note: Includes 2,338,564 votes for Duterte Youth, which the Commission on Elections (COMELEC) second division cancelled its registration on June 18, 2025, which was later affirmed by the COMELEC en banc, thereby preventing all of its nominees from assuming their seats. The COMELEC then proclaimed three party-lists with one seat each as winners.) | 17,739,183 | 30.93 | −3.62 | |
| Total votes | 57,350,958 | 100.00 | – | |
| Registered voters/turnout | 69,673,655 | 82.31 | −0.67 | |
Source: COMELEC (vote totals)

== See also ==
- Politics of the Philippines
- Senate of the Philippines
- House of Representatives of the Philippines
- Legislative districts of the Philippines
- List of legislatures of the Philippines
- List of Philippine Senate committees
- List of Philippine House of Representatives committees
- List of legislatures by country
- List of current members of the Congress of the Philippines by wealth

== Sources ==
- Ramirez, Efren V. and Lee, Jr., German G., The New Philippine Constitution. Cebu City: 1987: pp. 142–173.
- Article VI of the 1987 Philippine Constitution
- How a Bill becomes a Law
- Legislative History
- Your Legislature
