= Anthony Garcia (polo) =

Filipino-American polo player

Personal information
- National team: United States (1998)
- Born: February 3, 1981 (age 44)
- Children: 1

Sport
- Sport: Polo
- Club: GlobalPort

Anthony Garcia (born February 3, 1981) is a Filipino-American polo player with a 5-goal handicap He was part of the United States team which played in the 1998 World Polo Championship.

== Career ==
Garcia is a five-goaler polo player.

Garcia started playing polo at age 13 in Santa Barbara, California. He was part of the United States team which took part at the 1998 World Polo Championship. In the late-1990s, he played 26-goal.

He is part of the Mikee Romero-owned and captained team GlobalPort. He played in the 26-goal World Polo League with GlobalPort in 2023.

Garcia was the coach of the Philippine national team which took part at the polo tournaments at the 2019 SEA Games.

== Personal life ==
Garcia is a United States citizen. He is in a relationship with Filipino actress Andrea del Rosario who he first met in 2016 when she was campaigning for vice mayor of Calatagan. Garcia also owns a 6 hectares (15 acres) hacienda in Calatagan. Garcia has a daughter while del Rosario has a daughter of her own born in 2010 with another man.

His parents are Antonio Garcia and beauty queen Carolyn Masibay. His brother Adrian Christopher is also a polo player.
