= Globalport Polo Team =

Philippine polo club

Globalport
- Full name: GlobalPort–Passion For Polo / GlobalPort Polo Team
- Sport: Polo
- Location: Philippines
- Colors: Green
- Captain: Mikee Romero

The Globalport Polo Team (sometimes written as GlobalPort), also known as GlobalPort–Passion For Polo is a Philippine polo club.

== History ==
The Globalport Polo Team is named after seaport operator Globalport 900, Inc. of Mikee Romero. Romero, also the owner and captain of the team, has been playing polo since 2010.

The team has competed in international polo tournaments at home in the Philippines and abroad such as Thailand and the United States. It took part in the inaugural Philippine Open in 2014, losing to in the final.

Globalport has also played as the national team in the All Asia Cup. The played in the 2014, 2018 and 2020 edition — they placed second in the latter two.

In 2023, Globalport played at the 26-goal World Polo League.

For 2025, GlobalPort competed in the Gauntlet of Polo series by the United States Polo Association which is capped by the U.S. Open Polo Championship. The team became the first Asia-based participant in the U.S. Open where the reached the quarterfinals.

== Members ==
Current roster

For the 2025 US Open Polo Championship

- (United States) Mikee Romero
- (Argentina) Bartolomé Castagnola
- (Argentina) ‍Beltrán Laulhé
- (United States) Lucas Alberdi
- (United States) Nico Escobar (substitute)
- (Argentina) Santos Merlos (substitute)

Other players

- (Philippines) Anthony Garcia

== See also ==
- NorthPort Batang Pier
