= NorthPort Batang Pier draft history =

The NorthPort Batang Pier first participated in the Philippine Basketball Association (PBA) draft on August 19, 2012, one month before their first PBA season. The Batang Pier bought the original franchise of the Powerade Tigers in June 2012. NorthPort, then named as GlobalPort, received the rights for all of the Powerade's players and draftees.

Vic Manuel became the team's first draft choice, the 9th pick in the 2012 PBA draft (draft pick was acquired via trade with the B-Meg Llamados). In 2014, they made their first-ever #1 selection with Stanley Pringle.

== Selections ==
Basketball positions
PG	Point guard
SG	Shooting guard
SF	Small forward
PF	Power forward
C	Center

Draft	Round	Pick	Player	Position	Place of birth	School
2012	1	9	Vic Manuel	F	Philippines	PSBA
2012	1	10	Jason Deutchman	F	United States	San Diego State
2012	2	14	AJ Mandani	G	Canada	Missouri S&T
2012	3	26	Mark Acosta	F/C	Philippines	Mapúa
2012	4	33	Jan Colina	F	Philippines	Adamson
2012	5	37	VJ Serios	F	Philippines	State
2013	1	5	Terrence Romeo	PG	Philippines	Far Eastern
2013	1	6	RR Garcia	PG	Philippines	Far Eastern
2013	1	7	Isaac Holstein	C	United States	West Virginia
2013	2	11	Nico Salva	SF	Philippines	Ateneo
2013	3	12	Jopher Custodio	SG	Philippines	MLQU
2013	3	14	LA Revilla		Philippines	De La Salle
2014	1	1	Stanley Pringle	G	United States	Penn State
2014	1	7	Anthony Semerad	F/C	Australia	San Beda
2014	2	17	Prince Caperal	C	Philippines	Arellano
2014	2	19	John Pinto	G	Philippines	Arellano
2015	3	26	Roi Sumang	G	Philippines	UE
2015	4	37	Ryan Wetherell	G/F	United States	Southern California
2015	5	46	Bong Galanza	G	Philippines	UE
2016	Special draft		Von Pessumal	G	Philippines	Ateneo
2016	3	12	Al Francis Tamsi	G	Philippines	FEU
2016	3	15	Ryan Arambulo	G/F	United States	Cal State Fullerton
2016	4	20	Spencer John Eman	C	Philippines	NU
2017	1	6	Robbie Herndon	G	United States	San Francisco State
2017	2	24	Andreas Cahilig	F	Sweden	EARIST
2017	3	29	Zachary Nicholls	G	Canada	Arellano
2017	4	40	Gian Abrigo	G	Philippines	Adamson
2018	1	3	Robert Bolick	G	Philippines	San Beda
2018	3	25	Edrian Lao	F/C	Philippines	UV
2018	4	35	Jeremiah Taladua	G	Philippines	Letran
2018	5	41	John Ragasa	G	United Kingdom	St. Mary's (London)
2019	1	8	Sean Manganti	F	United States	Adamson
2019	2	24	Renzo Subido	G	Philippines	UST
2019	3	31	Cris Dumapig	F	Philippines	Southwestern U
2019	4	40	Dexter Zamora	G	Philippines	LPU
2020	Special draft		William Navarro	F	Greece	Ateneo
2020	1	2	Jamie Malonzo	F	United States	Portland State / La Salle
2020	1	11	Troy Rike	F/C	United States	Wake Forest / National U
2020	2	24	Mark Olayon	F	Philippines	UE
2020	3	26	Loren Brill	G	United States	Old Dominion
2020	4	37	Marvin Moraga	G	Philippines	St. Xavier
2020	5	47	Carl Bryan Ravanes	G	Philippines	Southville Foreign
2020	6	55	Seraj Elmejrab	C	Libya	LPU
2020	7	59	Jonico Rosales	G	Philippines	AMA
2020	8	61	Jed Mendoza	G	Philippines	JRU / UE
2021	1	6	JM Calma	C	Philippines	San Sebastian
2021	3	30	John Apacible	F	Philippines	UE
2021	4	40	JJ Caspe	G	Philippines	LPU
2021	5	48	Yves Sason	G	Philippines	PCU
2022	1	5	Zavier Lucero	F	United States	UP Diliman
2022	1	11	Cade Flores	F	Australia	Arellano
2022	3	29	Brent Paraiso	G	Philippines	Letran
2022	4	40	Fran Yu	PG	Philippines	Letran
2022	5	51	John Amores	G	Philippines	JRU
2022	6	60	Jan Sobrevega	G	Philippines	UE
2022	7	67	Ian Herrera	C	Philippines	UST
2022	8	71	Johnnel Bauzon	C/F	Philippines	Diliman College
2022	9	74	Joemari Lacastesantos	G	Philippines	LPU
2022	10	77	Nikko Paranada	G	United States	UE
2022	11	79	Regie Boy Basibas	F	Philippines	UST
Season 49
Season 49	1	5	Dave Ildefonso	G/F	Philippines	Ateneo
Season 49	2	14	Evan Nelle	G	Philippines	De La Salle
Season 49	3	29	Agem Miranda	G	Philippines	JRU
Season 49	4	39	John Uduba	F	Philippines	Olivarez
Season 49	5	46	Germy Mahinay	C	Philippines	NU
Season 49	6	48	Robbi Darang	G	Philippines	Diliman

=== Notes ===
1. All players entering the draft are Filipinos until proven otherwise.
