= 1-Pacman Party List =

Political party in the Philippines

1-Pacman
- — Philippine partylist —
- Full name: One Patriotic Coalition of Marginalized Nationals
- Secretary general: Richard Von De Castro
- Type: Sectoral party
- Sector(s) represented: Multi-sector
- Colors: Red, Green

Current representation (19th Congress)
- Seats in the House of Representatives: 0 / 3 (Out of 63 party-list seats)

The One Patriotic Coalition of Marginalized Nationals (abbreviated as 1-Pacman, and a namesake of Manny Pacquiao) is a political party-list based in the Philippines advocating for the marginalized and displaced sector in the country. In the 2016 national elections, 1-Pacman was one of the contenders in the party-list election. Leading the nominees were Mikee Romero, who was the team owner of GlobalPort Batang Pier in the Philippine Basketball Association (PBA) and Erick Pineda, who served as Pacquiao's business manager.

Among the main platforms of the party-list were to prioritize sports development, education and job creation.

The party-list group was endorsed by Pacquiao.

== Electoral history ==
=== Philippine House of Representatives elections, 2019 ===
For the 2019 Philippine House of Representatives elections.:

1. Mikee Romero, team owner, GlobalPort Batang Pier and CEO of Global900, Inc.
2. Enrico Pineda, business manager of Manny Pacquiao and team manager of Mahindra Enforcer
3. Nicolas "Nick" Enciso VIII, former deputy director general of Technical Education and Skills Development Authority (TESDA)
4. Marvee Espejo, executive vice president, Z.C. Integrated Port Services Inc.
5. Edwin Joseph G. Galvez, chairman of the Board GlobalPort 900 Inc.

=== 2022 elections ===
1-Pacman was among three party-list groups claiming to represent marginalized sectors that broadcast advertisements worth hundreds of millions of pesos. 1-Pacman aired ads worth ₱257.92 million from January 2021 to March 2022, counting ads broadcast before the campaign period.

1-Pacman claims to be a party of "marginalized nationals." Mikee Romero, 1-Pacman's first nominee, is the richest member of Congress and the 46th richest Filipino, with a net worth of ₱8.1 billion according to his Statement of Assets, Liabilities and Net Worth.

=== 2025 elections ===
The Philippine Center for Investigative Journalism tagged 1-Pacman as among the party-list groups with links to political dynasties, as 1-Pacman nominee Bobby Pacquiao is brother to Senator Manny Pacquiao, while Manny Pacquiao's wife Jinkee was also a nominee for another party-list group.

=== Electoral results ===
| Election | Votes | % | Secured Seats | Party-List Seats | Congress | 1st Representatives | 2nd Representatives | 3rd Representatives | Refs |
|---|---|---|---|---|---|---|---|---|---|
| 2016 | 1,310,197 | 4.05% | 2 / 3 | 59 | 17th Congress; 2016–2019 | Mikee Romero | Enrico Pineda | —N/a | |
| 2019 | 713,969 | 2.56% | 2 / 3 | 61 | 18th Congress; 2019–2022 | Mikee Romero | Enrico Pineda | —N/a | |
| 2022 | 273,195 | 0.74% | 1 / 3 | 63 | 19th Congress; 2022–2025 | Mikee Romero | —N/a | —N/a | |
| 2025 | 233,096 | 0.56% | 0 / 3 | 63 | 20th Congress; 2025–2028 | Failed to secure representation in Congress | | | |
Note: A party-list group can win a maximum of three seats in the House of Representatives.
