= NorthPort Batang Pier =

Philippine professional basketball team

- Founded: 2012
- Folded: Sold in 2025
- History: GlobalPort Batang Pier (2012–2018); NorthPort Batang Pier (2018–2025)
- Team colors: Neon orange, black, light orange, white
- Company: Sultan 900 Capital, Inc.
- Ownership: Mikee Romero

The NorthPort Batang Pier were a Philippine Basketball Association (PBA) team that first played in the 2012–13 PBA season. The team took over the franchise of the Powerade Tigers in 2012 after it was sold to Sultan 900 Capital, Inc. Besides NorthPort, team owner Mikee Romero also co-owned the AirAsia Philippine Patriots of the ASEAN Basketball League. The franchise was bought by Pureblends Corporation in 2025, converting the team into the Titan Ultra Giant Risers.

== Background ==
=== Harbour Centre Batang Pier ===
The origins of the NorthPort Batang Pier can be traced to the 2004 Philippine Basketball League (PBL) franchise, the Harbour Centre Port Masters owned by Mikee Romero. In 2007, they changed its team name to Harbour Centre Batang Pier until 2009. The franchise have successfully won 7 straight PBL championships under coach Glenn Capacio from the 2005–06 up to the 2008–09 season, which they carry the team name Oracle Residences Titans on the season's last conference. They also earned the first place in 2007 SEABA Champions Cup.

=== Sale of the Powerade franchise ===
On July 30, 2012, Coca-Cola Bottlers Philippines, Inc. announced that their PBA team, the Powerade Tigers, was sold to Sultan 900, Inc. which is owned and represented by its chairman and CEO Michael Romero. The board of governors unanimously approved the purchase on a special board meeting on August 17.

== History ==
=== 2012–2013: First season ===
GlobalPort Batang Pier
- Colors

Uniforms
Light uniform	Dark uniform

GlobalPort entered the league under the guidance of rookie head coach, Glenn Capacio, with the lineup led by Powerade carry-overs Gary David, Rabeh Al-Hussaini, Rudy Lingganay, Rey Guevarra, Jondan Salvador, Josh Vanlandingham, Will Antonio, Alex Crisano and Rommel Adducul, together with off-season trade in from Barangay Ginebra, Willie Miller (in exchange for JVee Casio), draft picks Vic Manuel, Jason Deutchman and AJ Mandani, and signed free agents Marvin Cruz, Mark Yee and Angelus Raymundo. The team finished with a disappointing 1–13 record in its maiden campaign, winning only on October 17, 2012, against Meralco.

Ahead of the Commissioner's Cup, former Barako Bull coach Junel Baculi was appointed as the new head coach, while Capacio stayed on the GlobalPort coaching staff as Baculi's lead assistant. The team pulled off a major roster revamp, as the PBA approved two trades that landed previous conference's cellar dweller a major boost in the form of Sol Mercado and Japeth Aguilar, thus, forming the team's so-called MMDA (Miller, Mercado, David and Aguilar). The team acquired Mercado from the Meralco along with Kelly Nabong, Jaypee Belencion and Yousif Aljamal, in exchange for Rey Guevarra, Vic Manuel, Josh Vanlandingham and their 2015 1st-round pick, while Rabeh Al-Hussaini was traded out to Talk 'N Text for Aguilar. The new Batang Pier looked promising after winning 2 of its first 3 games, but then the team lost all of its remaining games in the elimination, ending its campaign with a 2–12 record.

On June 11, 2013, GlobalPort's MMDA was disbanded as Japeth Aguilar was traded to Barangay Ginebra for Yousef Taha and the 2013 1st round draft pick it received from Talk 'N Text. In a separate deal, the team acquired Jay Washington from Petron Blaze for Jason Deutchman and the Batang Pier's 2016 and 2017 second round draft picks. The team ended the eliminations with a 4–5 record as Washington exploded for a career-high of 30 points and led the team in a win on their final elimination assignment against Ginebra. After two consecutive conferences finishing at the bottom of the standings, the team finally lands a spot in the play-offs as they finished fifth in the eliminations. Facing fourth seeded Rain or Shine having a twice-to-beat advantage, and as Baculi got ejected for a second technical foul late in the third quarter, the Batang Pier lost by a single basket and got eliminated in the first game of their quarterfinals series.

=== 2013–2014: Terrence Romeo arrives ===
GlobalPort Batang Pier
- Colors

Uniforms
Light uniform	Dark uniform

Before the start of the next season, GlobalPort underwent another major overhaul. They let coach Baculi go and appointed Richie Ticzon as new coach in an interim capacity. They also traded away David to Meralco. He was packaged by the Batang Pier with rookie guard AJ Mandani and sent to Meralco for guard Chris Ross, Chris Timberlake and two future second-round draft picks. Ross was also traded away to Petron for Dennis Miranda, who was eventually traded to Barako Bull in exchange for the sixth overall draft pick which they used to select RR Garcia. They also traded Miller to the Energy in exchange for veteran Enrico Villanueva on draft day.

They drafted college standouts Terrence Romeo (in the expense of sending Yousef Taha to Petron), Garcia, Isaac Holstein, Nico Salva and LA Revilla, who teamed up with established veterans Sol Mercado, Jay Washington, and former league MVP Eric Menk, who returned from playing in the ABL. Holstein was later traded to San Mig Super Coffee in exchange for fellow rookie Justin Chua and veteran Leo Najorda. The team also acquired Jewel Ponferada from the Mixers for a future draft pick and signed up Marvin Hayes. They have even won their first ever winning streak since they joined the league. However, they lost five straight games, only to be snapped in a win against Alaska, to keep their playoff hopes alive.

They ended their Philippine Cup elimination campaign with 5–9 win–loss record, taking the seventh place playoff spot, and were pitted against twice-to-beat Rain or Shine in the quarterfinal round. They were ousted by E-Painters in their lone playoff game.

Prior to the start of the Commissioner's Cup, they made significant changes again. Pido Jarencio takes over as the new coach, in his first pro coaching career, Richie Ticzon. They also traded away Mercado for Alex Cabagnot. They sent Najorda back to Barako Bull for point guard Jonas Villanueva, with Villanueva then getting conveyed to Air21 for guard Bonbon Custodio. Menk was also appointed as the new captain of the team. Mark Macapagal was signed from free agency. In the middle of the conference, big man Enrico Villanueva, who only played one game for Batang Pier, was acquired by Air21 in exchange for Ronnie Matias and Carlo Sharma. After losing their first 8 games, the Batang Pier won their last assignment against Barako Bull to give Jarencio his first win in the PBA. The team finished last in this conference.

Before the Commissioner's Cup officially ended, GlobalPort pushed through their bid to acquire Taha from San Miguel Beer in exchange of rookie big man Justin Chua. After playing for a few games for the Batang Pier, Taha was then shipped to San Mig Super Coffee camp along with Ronnie Matias for center Yancy De Ocampo and sniper Val Acuña. In a separate deal, GlobalPort traded Nico Salva and Bonbon Custodio to the Barako Bull Energy to acquire Ronjay Buenafe plus a future second-round pick of the Energy. Rudy Lingganay was also reacquired after being released prior to the start of the previous conference. A repeat performance for the Batang Pier as they ended the season-ending conference with another 1–8 win–loss record.

=== 2014–2018: The Stanley Pringle and Terrence Romeo era ===
==== 2014–2015 season ====
With new season, new team logo, and a lot of fresh faces, GlobalPort continues to build its lineup. During the offseason, several trades were approved by the PBA. The team started by a one on one trade between incoming sophomore point guard RR Garcia for the services of Barako Bull forward Keith Jensen. It was followed by the departure of ex-team captain Menk to join Alaska Milk in exchange for two second round picks. Jondan Salvador was then shipped back to Barako Bull for sweet-shooting forward Mark Isip. And after being in and out of the trade bloc, GlobalPort management decided to trade Gilas forward Washington to Talk 'N Text for Nonoy Baclao and the Tropang Texters’ 2017 first round pick. The team also had a big rookie harvest from the 2014 PBA draft selecting Stanley Pringle as the first overall pick, Anthony Semerad (7th), Prince Caperal (17th) and John Pinto (19th). Jojo Duncil was then picked up by the Batang Pier, after being released by Barako Bull and signed the undrafted rookie Roider Cabrera, including the unsigned Kia Sorento pick, Paolo Taha.

Jarencio steered the team to a 4–4 start, including a huge upset victory against Talk 'N Text, which was also the franchise' first win against the Texters since joining the league in 2012. The average margin of their losses was only 4.25 points, until they were hammered by San Miguel with a 95–69 defeat, resulting to a sudden change within their coaching staff. Assistant coach Eric Gonzales was appointed as interim head coach, while Jarencio was named as the team's consultant. In this instance, the coaching change produced instant results for GlobalPort. The team gave Barangay Ginebra a tough beating with a 21-point victory. Gonzales became only man to claim a first game win as head coach of the Batang Pier, aside from helming the franchise to its biggest win since joining the league prior to the 2012–13 season. The team then lost its chance for a twice-to-beat edge to Meralco on their final elimination game. They placed 8th with a 5–6 record. Before the start of the quarterfinals, Cabagnot was traded back to San Miguel in exchange for Mercado and the second round picks of 2018 and 2019. The team ended the campaign with the loss to Barangay Ginebra in the play-offs. Before the tourney was over, Mercado was traded away after playing one game for the Batang Pier to Barako Bull in exchange for Denok Miranda and a 2016 second-rounder.

GlobalPort debuted with C. J. Leslie as their import and won the opening game of the Commissioner's Cup. Leslie's numbers were impressive and he led the Batang Pier to a 2–2 record, but a lack of inside threat was the main reason why he was replaced by Calvin Warner. On their game against Blackwater, Warner posted a new franchise record 30 rebounds, while the team notched a new franchise best mark of 74 total rebounds. It was the team's first back-to-back wins under Coach Gonzales as they also registered their biggest win margin at 23 points. However, a personal reason caused Warner to leave the country, so the team opted to switch import once more to Derrick Caracter. They also traded Nonoy Baclao to Alaska, and received Gabby Espinas in return, while exchanging the teams' 2017 first rounders. Unfortunately, the team lost all of its remaining games with Caracter as their import and failed to clinched a quarterfinal slot. Before the conference ended, GlobalPort parted ways with Espinas and Yancy De Ocampo, and welcomed Billy Mamaril and Doug Kramer in a 4-team trade.

Milestone after milestone, all PBA teams are given the option to have an Asian import this conference aside from the regular imports and the team signed in Omar Krayem. The team also got the chance to have an import with unlimited height after being ranked at the bottom four of the standings after the first two conferences and they signed in their first 7-footer import in Patrick O'Bryant. He was replaced by Steve Thomas after two games. The team had their best start ever at 3–0 after, including their first ever franchise win against Star since joining the league. They parted ways with Kelly Nabong in a three-team trade that sent him to the Bolts while receiving a second-rounder from NLEX. The Batang Pier also went on their first out of the country game in Dubai parading their first import choice in Jarrid Famous, but they lost to the Elasto Painters in a game where Romeo scored his career-high 40 points, which is, according to Fidel Mangonon III, the franchise record for most points scored in a game, which is also equals to the production of Markeith Cummings in 2013. Romeo also became the 13th among active players who've scored 40+ in a PBA game according to Mangonon. The team recorded its highest scoring output in a 123–120 win against the Tropang Texters, and its biggest winning margin by far at 28 points against NLEX while Famous notched a team record of 37 rebounds in a single game (3rd highest all time in the PBA). The team also registered their most wins in a conference with 7 wins. They ended the eliminations with a 7–4 record, good enough for their best-ever finish at 4th seed, which was rewarded with a twice-to-beat advantage against fifth seeded Star. However, the Hotshots managed to overcome their twice-to-win disadvantage, including the most lopsided win in playoffs history of the PBA with a 126–73 beating of the Batang Pier.

==== 2015–2016 season ====
The Batang Pier squad is determined to top their fifth-place finish from the previous season and reach the semifinals for the first time. The team had a busy off-season which started with the acquisition of Joseph Yeo from Barako Bull in exchange for the 2016 first round pick and the 2018 2nd round pick (whichever is lower). The team then traded Jewel Ponferada and their 2015 second round pick for the services of Jervy Cruz, who was sent to Barako Bull for Rico Maierhofer. A one-on-one deal also took place as the Batang Pier sent Miranda for the return of Washington to the team. Many were also surprised to see Roi Sumang fell on the third round of the PBA Draft who was gladly selected by GlobalPort, having no first and second round picks. The team also signed free agents Jonathan Uyloan and Philip Paniamogan, who was undrafted from the 2014 PBA Draft. Finally, Prince Caperal became part of a four team trade that saw Dorian Peña land at GlobalPort.

The Batang Pier triumphed against Barako Bull with a twice-to-beat advantage in the first phase of the quarterfinals. They outlasted Barangay Ginebra in a controversial knockout match in the second phase. The team entered the semifinals to face top seeded Alaska in a best of 7 series. After winning Game One behind Romeo's 41 points, GlobalPort lost four straight games to bow out of the tournament. It was the best finish of the franchise for the last four years. On the brighter side, the tandem of Romeo and Pringle was recognized by the PBA as the "Slash Brothers".

The team failed to pick-up where they left-off in the Philippine Cup as the Slash Brothers were hampered with injuries in the majority of the conference. To fill the guard rotation, the Batang Pier acquired Jeric Fortuna from Phoenix Fuel Masters by sending the team's 2018 second round pick. Imports Brian Williams and Calvin Warner failed to deliver for the team's first few games as they were eventually replaced by Shawn Taggart by the end of the conference. However, the team still finished dead last with a 3–8 standing.

Player movement was expected ahead of the Governors' Cup, as Keith Jensen, Paola Taha, Jonathan Uyloan and Roi Sumang were involved in a three-team trade. In return, GlobalPort acquired Karl Dehesa, Ronald Pascual and Yousef Taha, who's on his third duty as a Batang Pier. The team also signed free agents Sunday Salvacion, Gab Banal and Papot Paredes. They also paraded Dominique Sutton as their import but was later replaced by Mike Glover as GlobalPort let Sutton pursue his NBA Dream. Ronald Pascual was also traded to Blackwater for Mike Cortez. The team did not find their groove in the Governors' Cup and they finished 10th with a 4–7 card.

==== 2016–2017 season ====
GlobalPort announced Franz Pumaren to be the head coach for this season. Key players were added in the roster: KG Canaleta was signed from free agency; the team acquired J. R. Quinahan for Jay Washington, Mick Pennisi for Doug Kramer, and Aaron Aban for GP's 2019 second round pick; Von Pessumal was tapped from the Gilas Special Draft and Jessie Saitanan was given contract after being unsigned by Meralco from the regular draft. During the season, Josh Urbiztondo and Yutien Andrada was also picked up, however, the team relegated Karl Dehesa to become an unrestricted free agent.

Terrence Romeo once again led the league in scoring and was also one of the assist leaders during the conference. The team clinched the 5th seed and faced TNT KaKropa in the quarterfinals. TNT swept GlobalPort in their series. Coach Pumaren emphasized how shallow the bench of GlobalPort was and stated that in order to move forward, player changes are needed.

The team's roster was intact as the Commissioner's Cup started. The team's losses continue to pile up due to Terrence Romeo's health woes and some import changes from Sean Williams to Malcolm White. kg Canaleta was dealt to Blackwater for Dylan Ababou and James Forrester. The team seemed to miss the playoffs until GlobalPort made some moves near the end of the eliminations. JR Quinahan and Anthony Semerad were traded together with a 2017 1st rounder to get Sean Anthony and Gilas cadets, Jonathan Grey and Bradwyn Guinto. Justin Harper also replaced White and the fortunes of the Batang Pier turned around. They managed to reach the playoffs after ousting Alaska in a knockoff game for 8th seed. However, the team bowed to the 1st seeded Ginebra in a heated battle which saw the ejection of Terrence Romeo after an altercation with LA Tenorio.

Ahead of the Governors' Cup, GlobalPort traded Von Pessumal for fellow cadet Arnold Van Opstal. The team also signed Ryan Araña, Mark Cardona, Paulo Hubalde and Robby Celiz from the free agent pool. Dylan Ababou was also shipped for Mac Baracael. Jabril Trawick was the team's import for the first game but was replaced by Murphy Holloway throughout the conference. The Batang Pier showed promise as they split their first 6 assignments before losing 5 straight games to end their campaign, mainly due to the absence of Romeo or Pringle for different reasons. They finished 10th in the standings after the elimination round.

==== 2017–2018 season ====
During the off-season, the team drafted Fil-Am Robert Herndon, Andreas Cahilig, former Arellano Chief Zach Nicholls and Gian Abrigo. The draft rights of Herndon and Abrigo were then traded to the Magnolia Hotshots in exchange for the rights of co-rookies Julian Sargent, Lervin Flores and Joseph Gabayni. They also brought back Pido Jarencio as head coach. They played most of the conference without Romeo who was injured from the previous conference and only compiled a 5–6 win – loss record for the 7th seed and a quarterfinal match-up against the 2nd seeded Hotshots who have a twice-to-win advantage. Despite having the lead at halftime with a score of 45–34 and a decent 14 point, 5 rebound, 6 assist performance for the returning Romeo, they lost to the Hotshots 86–79.

===== Rebranding to NorthPort =====
The GlobalPort Batang Pier announced on August 10, 2018, that they will compete as the NorthPort Batang Pier for the 2018 PBA Governors' Cup.

=== 2019–2023: The Robert Bolick and Sean Anthony era ===
In the 2018 PBA draft, the NorthPort selected Robert Bolick with the third overall pick. The team had a surprising run throughout the 2019 PBA season. After a quarterfinals exit in the Philippine Cup, the team finished the Commissioner's Cup in second place with a 9–2 record, their best finish yet. This comes despite Stanley Pringle only playing two games in the conference due to surgery and later being traded away to Barangay Ginebra San Miguel. Unfortunately, their winning prowess didn't carry over to the quarterfinals, losing to the San Miguel Beermen in two games. During the Governors' Cup, the Batang Pier made another trade, sending Mo Tautuaa to the Beermen for Christian Standhardinger. After finishing 8th in the eliminations, the Batang Pier faced the NLEX Road Warriors in the quarterfinals with the disadvantage of having to win back-to-back games. However, the team pushed through and after a triple-overtime victory in game 2, NorthPort was bound for the semifinals for the first time since 2016. The team eventually lost to Barangay Ginebra in four games of the best-of-five series.

In the few years since, the team failed to go back to the semifinals. Additionally, the team made more trades with its key players, with Standhardinger heading to Barangay Ginebra in 2021 and Sean Anthony going to the Phoenix Super LPG Fuel Masters early in 2022. However, the team also acquired younger talent along the way. William Navarro was selected in the special round of the PBA season 46 draft in 2021, though he didn't play until 2022 due to obligations with Gilas Pilipinas. Jamie Malonzo was also selected second overall in the same draft, but was traded away to Ginebra in 2022 for Arvin Tolentino and Prince Caperal.

=== 2023–2025: The Arvin Tolentino era ===
With Robert Bolick departing for the Japanese B.League and eventually joining the NLEX Road Warriors, the team was now led by the likes of Arvin Tolentino, William Navarro, and Joshua Munzon, the latter of which was acquired via a trade with the Terrafirma Dyip.

In the 2024–25 PBA Commissioner's Cup, following another set of middling performances, NorthPort found themselves in first place for the first and only time in their franchise's history, finishing with a 9–3 record. The team beat the Magnolia Chicken Timplados Hotshots in a close quarterfinal game to bring the Batang Pier to the semifinals for the first time since 2019. They then faced Barangay Ginebra San Miguel, who they lost to in five games. After the conference, however, the team had a major shake-up as Navarro was traded to Magnolia while Tolentino's contract with the team expired and then left for the Korean Basketball League. In the 2025 PBA Philippine Cup, what would become the franchise's final conference in the PBA, the team went down to 11th place after recording just to two wins in eliminations.

=== The sale to Pureblends ===
On September 3, 2025, the NorthPort franchise was acquired by Pureblends Corporation for ₱90 million. While the sale was being approved, the team still took part as NorthPort in the 2025 PBA draft and signing Johnedel Cardel as the team's new head coach. The sale was completed by October 1, with the new team named the Titan Ultra Giant Risers, thus putting an end to the Batang Pier.

== Final roster ==
2024–25 NorthPort Batang Pier roster
Players
Coaches

Pos.	#	POB	Name	Height	Weight	DOB (YYYY–MM–DD)	From
G	0	(Philippines)	Paolo Taha	6 ft 0 in (1.83 m)	180 lb (82 kg)	1990–12–05	St. Benilde
F	1	(Philippines)	Sidney Onwubere	6 ft 4 in (1.93 m)		1993–08–01	Emilio Aguinaldo
G	3	(Philippines)	Fran Yu	5 ft 9 in (1.75 m)	154 lb (70 kg)	1998–06–16	Letran
G	5	(Philippines)	Allyn Bulanadi	6 ft 0 in (1.83 m)		1997–04–28	San Sebastian
G	7	(Philippines)	Jerrick Balanza	6 ft 1 in (1.85 m)	190 lb (86 kg)	1996–09–06	Letran
G	15	(Canada)	James Kwekuteye	6 ft 2 in (1.88 m)	182 lb (83 kg)	1998–08–15	San Beda
F	17	(Philippines)	Calvin Abueva	6 ft 3 in (1.91 m)	209 lb (95 kg)	1988–02–04	San Sebastian
G	20	(Philippines)	Evan Nelle (R)	5 ft 11 in (1.80 m)		1998–06–08	De La Salle
F/C	22	(Australia)	Cade Flores	6 ft 5 in (1.96 m)	214 lb (97 kg)		Arellano
G/F	24	(United States)	Joshua Munzon (C)	6 ft 4 in (1.93 m)	200 lb (91 kg)	1995–01–15	Cal State LA
G	27	(Canada)	Avan Nava (R)	6 ft 2 in (1.88 m)	180 lb (82 kg)	2000–04–04	St. Francis Xavier
G	28	(Philippines)	Jio Jalalon	5 ft 9 in (1.75 m)	150 lb (68 kg)	1992–08–02	Arellano
C	37	(Philippines)	Damie Cuntapay	6 ft 5 in (1.96 m)		1998–10–22	San Beda

Head coach

- (Philippines) Bonnie Tan

Assistant coach(es)

- (Philippines) Jeff Napa (1st assistant)
- (Philippines) Rensy Bajar
- (Philippines) Alfredo Jarencio II
- (Philippines) Michael Oliver

Team manager

- (Philippines) Pido Jarencio
- (Philippines) Waiyip Chong (assistant)

Legend

- (C) Team captain
- (CI) Commissioner's Cup Import
- (GI) Governors' Cup Import
- (EI) EASL Import
- (DP) Unsigned draft pick
- (FA) Free agent
- (IN) Inactive
- (S) Suspended
- (R) Rookie
- Injured

Roster

== Season-by-season records ==
List of the last five conferences completed by the NorthPort franchise. For the full-season history, see List of NorthPort Batang Pier seasons.

Note: GP = Games played, W = Wins, L = Losses, W–L% = Winning percentage

Season	Conference	GP	W	L	W–L%	Finish	Playoffs
2023–24	Commissioner's	11	6	5	.545	6th	Lost in quarterfinals vs. Barangay Ginebra**, 93–106
2023–24	Philippine	11	5	6	.455	9th	Lost in eighth seed playoff vs. Terrafirma, 96–104
2024–25	Governors'	10	3	7	.300	5th (Group A)	Did not qualify
2024–25	Commissioner's	12	9	3	.750	1st	Lost in semifinals vs. Barangay Ginebra, 1–4
2024–25	Philippine	11	2	9	.182	11th	Did not qualify
An asterisk (*) indicates one-game playoff; two asterisks (**) indicates team with twice-to-beat advantage

== Head coaches ==
NorthPort Batang Pier head coaches
Name	Start	End	Seasons	Overall record				Best finish
Name	Start	End	Seasons	W	L	PCT	G	Best finish
Glenn Capacio	2012	2012	1	1	13	0.07	14	Eliminations
Junel Baculi	2013	2013	1	6	17	0.35	23	Quarterfinals (5th seed)
Richie Ticzon	2013	2014	1	5	9	0.36	14	Quarterfinals (7th seed)
Pido Jarencio	2014	2014	1	6	21	0.22	27	Eliminations
Eric Gonzales	2014	2015	1	5	9	0.36	14	Quarterfinals (8th seed)
Pido Jarencio	2015	2016	2	17	14	.548	31	Semifinals (5th seed)
Eric Gonzales	2016	2016	1	2	8	.200	10	Eliminations
Johnedel Cardel	2016	2016	1	5	7	.417	12	Eliminations
Franz Pumaren	2016	2017	1	14	23	.378	37	Quarterfinals (5th seed)
Pido Jarencio	2017	2023	5	56	92	.378	148	Semifinals (8th seed)
Bonnie Tan	2021	2025	4	33	44	.429	77	Semifinals (1st seed)

== Player of Note ==
=== Other Notable Players ===
- Dylan Ababou
- Aaron Aban
- Val Acuña
- Rommel Adducul
- Japeth Aguilar
- Rabeh Al-Hussaini
- Yousif Aljamal
- Chad Alonzo
- Yutien Andrada
- Sean Anthony
- William Antonio
- Nonoy Baclao
- Jerrick Balanza
- Gabriel Banal
- Mac Baracael
- Jaypee Belencion
- Robert Bolick
- Ronjay Buenafe
- Alex Cabagnot
- Roider Cabrera
- KG Canaleta
- Prince Caperal
- Mark Cardona
- JVee Casio
- Jeff Chan
- Justin Chua
- Alex Crisano
- Mike Cortez
- Jervy Cruz
- Marvin Cruz
- Bonbon Custodio
- Jopher Custodio
- Gary David
- Yancy De Ocampo
- Karl Dehesa
- Arthur dela Cruz
- Jason Deutchman
- Jojo Duncil
- Gabby Espinas
- Nico Elorde
- Bryan Faundo
- Kevin Ferrer
- Jeric Fortuna
- RR Garcia
- Jonathan Grey
- Rey Guevarra
- Bradwyn Guinto
- Marvin Hayes
- Isaac Holstein
- Paolo Hubalde
- Mark Isip
- Keith Jensen
- Doug Kramer
- Garvo Lanete
- Rudy Lingganay
- Zavier Lucero
- Mark Macapagal
- Rico Maierhofer
- Jamie Malonzo
- Billy Mamaril
- AJ Mandani
- Sean Manganti
- Vic Manuel
- Ronnie Matias
- Sol Mercado
- Eric Menk
- Willie Miller
- Denok Miranda
- Kelly Nabong
- Leo Najorda
- Philip Paniamogan
- Philip Paredes
- Ronald Pascual
- Dorian Peña
- Mick Pennisi
- Von Pessumal
- John Pinto
- Jewel Ponferada
- Stanley Pringle
- J.R. Quiñahan
- Angelus Raymundo
- LA Revilla
- Troy Rike
- Terrence Romeo
- Jessie Saitanan
- Nico Salva
- Sunday Salvacion
- Jondan Salvador
- Arwind Santos
- Anthony Semerad
- Carlo Sharma
- Greg Slaughter
- Christian Standhardinger
- Renzo Subido
- Roi Sumang
- Paolo Taha
- Yousef Taha
- Moala Tautuaa
- Josh Urbiztondo
- Jonathan Uyloan
- Josh Vanlandingham
- Arnold Van Opstal
- Al Vergara
- Enrico Villanueva
- Jay Washington
- Mark Yee
- Joseph Yeo

=== Imports ===
- Justin Williams (2013 PBA Commissioner's Cup)
- Walter Sharpe (2013 PBA Commissioner's Cup)
- Sylvester Morgan (2013 PBA Commissioner's Cup)
- Markeith Cummings (2013 PBA Governor's Cup)
- Evan Brock (2014 PBA Commissioner's Cup)
- LeRoy Hickerson (2014 PBA Governors' Cup)
- Dior Lowhorn (2014 PBA Governors' Cup)
- C. J. Leslie (2015 PBA Commissioner's Cup)
- Calvin Warner (2015 PBA Commissioner's Cup)
- Derrick Caracter (2015 PBA Commissioner's Cup)
- Patrick O'Bryant (2015 PBA Governors' Cup)
- Omar Krayem (2015 PBA Governors' Cup)
- Steven Thomas (2015 PBA Governors' Cup)
- Jarrid Famous (2015 PBA Governors' Cup)
- Brian Williams (2016 PBA Commissioner's Cup)
- Calvin Warner (2016 PBA Commissioner's Cup)
- Shawn Taggart (2016 PBA Commissioner's Cup)
- Dominique Sutton (2016 PBA Governors' Cup)
- Mike Glover (2016 PBA Governors' Cup)
- Sean Williams (2017 PBA Commissioner's Cup)
- Malcolm White (2017 PBA Commissioner's Cup)
- Justin Harper (2017 PBA Commissioner's Cup)
- Jabril Trawick (2017 PBA Governors' Cup)
- Murphy Holloway (2017 PBA Governors' Cup)
- Malcolm White (2018 PBA Commissioner's Cup)
- Rashad Woods (2018 PBA Governors' Cup)
- Prince Ibeh (2019 PBA Commissioner's Cup)
- Mychal Ammons (2019 PBA Governors' Cup)
- Michael Qualls (2019 PBA Governors' Cup)
- Cameron Forte (2021 PBA Governors' Cup)
- Jamel Artis (2021 PBA Governors' Cup)
- Prince Ibeh (2022-23 PBA Commissioner's Cup)
- Marcus Weathers (2023 PBA Governors' Cup)
- Kevin Murphy (2023 PBA Governors' Cup)
- Venky Jois (2023-24 PBA Commissioner's Cup)
- Taylor Johns (2024 PBA Governors' Cup)
- Venky Jois (2024 PBA Governors' Cup)
- Kadeem Jack (2024–25 PBA Commissioner's Cup)

== Awards ==
=== Individual awards ===
PBA Best Player of the Conference	PBA Rookie of the Year Award	PBA All-Defensive Team
Christian Standhardinger (2019 Governors')	Stanley Pringle (2014–15)	Christian Standhardinger (2020); Arwind Santos (2021); Joshua Munzon (2023–24, 2024–25)
PBA Mythical First Team	PBA Mythical Second Team	PBA Most Improved Player
Terrence Romeo (2015–16); Stanley Pringle (2017–18); Sean Anthony (2019); Christian Standhardinger (2019); Arwind Santos (2021); Arvin Tolentino (2023–24, 2024–25)	Stanley Pringle (2014–15); Terrence Romeo (2014–15); Robert Bolick (2021, 2022–23); Arvin Tolentino (2022–23)	Terrence Romeo (2014–15); Joshua Munzon (2024–25)
PBA Sportsmanship Award
Paul Zamar (2023–24)

=== PBA Press Corps Individual Awards ===
Defensive Player of the Year	Bogs Adornado Comeback Player of the Year	All-Rookie Team
Sean Anthony (2019); Arwind Santos (2021)	Roi Sumang (2022–23)	Terrence Romeo (2013–14); Stanley Pringle (2014–15); Robert Bolick (2019); Renzo Subido (2020); Jamie Malonzo (2021); Cade Flores (2023–24)

=== All-Star Weekend ===
All-Star MVP	Obstacle Challenge
Terrence Romeo (2015, 2017 Visayas Leg)	JM Calma (2024)
Three-Point Shootout	All-Star Selection
Mark Macapagal (2014); Terrence Romeo (2015, 2016)	2013: Gary David; 2015: Stanley Pringle; Terrence Romeo; 2016: Stanley Pringle; Terrence Romeo; 2017: Von Pessumal; Stanley Pringle; J.R. Quiñahan; Terrence Romeo; 2018: Stanley Pringle; 2023: Robert Bolick; Jeff Chan; Arwind Santos; Arvin Tolentino; 2024: Arvin Tolentino

== See also ==
- NorthPort Batang Pier draft history
- GlobalPort Polo Team

Preceded by Powerade Tigers	PBA team lineage 2012–2025	Succeeded by Titan Ultra Giant Risers
