= Mikee Romero =

Filipino businessman and politician (born 1972)

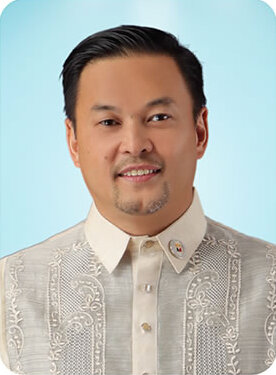
- Official portrait, 2022

Deputy Speaker of the House of Representatives
- In office October 14, 2020 – June 1, 2022 Serving with several others
- House Speaker: Lord Allan Velasco
- Preceded by: Luis Raymund Villafuerte
- In office August 13, 2019 – October 2, 2020
- House Speaker: Alan Peter Cayetano
- Succeeded by: Fredenil Castro

Member of the Philippine House of Representatives for the 1-Pacman party-list
- In office June 30, 2016 – June 30, 2025 Serving with Enrico Pineda (2016–2022)
- Preceded by: Office established
- Constituency: Party-list

Personal details
- Born: Michael Odylon Lagman Romero; March 21, 1972 (age 54) Manila, Philippines
- Party: 1-Pacman
- Spouse: Sheila Bermudez (m. 1992)
- Children: 5 (inc. Milka)
- Parent(s): Reghis Romero II; Lilibeth Lagman-Romero
- Education: De La Salle University
- Website
- Years active: 2002–present
- Board member of: Globalport 900; AirAsia Philippines
- Basketball career

Career information
- College: De La Salle

Other information
- Sports career
- Nationality: Philippines / United States (Note: The World Polo Tour lists Mikee Romero's sporting nationality as "United States". However he has officially represented the Philippines at the 2019 SEA Games.)
- Sport: Polo
- Rank: 24 (WPT amateur); 6 (US Polo)
- Club: GlobalPort

Sports achievements and titles
- Highest world ranking: 24 (WPT amateur); May 2025
Medal record
Polo
Representing Philippines
SEA Games
Bronze medal – third place	2019 Philippines	0–2 low goal

Michael Odylon "Mikee" Lagman Romero (Tagalog: [ˈmaɪki roˈmɛɾo]; born March 21, 1973) is a Filipino businessman, politician, and sportsman. He served as the Party-list Congressman for 1-Pacman from 2016 to 2025 holding roles as Senior Deputy Speaker.

As a businessman, Romero is currently the chairman and president of Globalport 900 and owns the NorthPort Batang Pier basketball team in the Philippine Basketball Association (PBA). As of December 2018, his declared net worth is ₱7.858 billion. He was the Philippines' richest Congressman and one of the country's 50 richest individuals.

Romero is also a world-ranked polo player, and a Southeast Asian Games medalist.

== Business career ==
Romero serves as chair of the Board of Globalport 900, Inc. (PSE: PORT), formerly MIC Holdings Corp, since June 7, 2012. He graduated with a Bachelor of Arts from De La Salle University (while also playing for the university's varsity basketball team) and a Master's in Business Management from the Asian Institute of Management. He also holds two doctorate degrees in Business Administration and Political Economics coming from the International Academy of Management and Economics and De La Salle University.

He is also chief executive officer of Harbour Centre Port Terminal, Inc., chair of Manila North Harbour Port, Inc., chair of Mikro-tech Capital, Inc., CEO of Pacifica, Inc. and vice chair of AirAsia Philippines.

Son of construction magnate Reghis Romero II, Romero worked in venture capital in Singapore before returning home in 2002 to seize the country's infrastructure opportunity. He converted his family's reclaimed land into Harbour Center Port Terminal, now the country's biggest bulk and breakbulk port. He listed his port assets in 2011, with a reverse takeover of listed MIC Holdings, renaming it as GlobalPort 900, Inc. He said he wants to build a 'seaport highway' across the Philippines archipelago. He also has a 65% stake in Manila North Harbour, country's biggest port, where San Miguel is a partner. Other interests include mining, hotels, a 20% stake in Air Asia Philippines and 15% in Alfred Yao's Zest Airways.

== Political career ==
Romero was named as one of the new deputy speakers of House Speaker Alan Peter Cayetano on August 13, 2019. During a House leadership crisis which began in late September 2020, Romero supported Lord Allan Velasco's speakership bid in accordance with the term-sharing agreement between Cayetano and Velasco during the commencement of the 18th Congress. On October 2, Fredenil Castro (Capiz–2nd) challenged the representatives to resign if they cannot cooperate with Cayetano's leadership. Deputy Majority Leader Xavier Jesus Romualdo moved to have Castro replace Romero as a deputy speaker. The motion was approved without objections, removing Romero from the position.

On October 12, a majority of House members held session at the Celebrity Sports Complex in Quezon City. After they declared the speakership vacant, Romero was one of those who nominated Velasco as speaker. Velasco was declared as the new speaker after garnering 186 votes, more than the 151 needed for a majority. However, Cayetano's side questioned the legality of the session. The next day, Velasco was formally elected in an official session held at the Batasang Pambansa while Cayetano resigned. On October 14, Romero was again elected as a deputy speaker, replacing the ousted Luis Raymund Villafuerte (Camarines Sur–2nd), a Cayetano ally.

A three-term congressman, Romero has held several leadership roles in the House of Representatives, including Senior Deputy Speaker and Political Affairs Head (2019–2022), Chairman of the Committee on Poverty Alleviation (2022–2025), and Deputy Majority Leader (2016–2019).

He has an extensive legislative record, having authored 148 Republic Acts and over 1,200 bills and resolutions, focusing on key areas such as poverty alleviation, healthcare, education, and national defense. Among his most notable legislative contributions are the Expanded Conditional Cash Transfer Program (Pantawid Pamilyang Pilipino Program), the Magna Carta for the Poor, the Free College Tuition Law, and the Barangay Health Worker Benefits Act.

== Sports career ==
As a businessman, Romero is currently the chairman and president of Globalport 900 and owns the NorthPort Batang Pier basketball team in the Philippine Basketball Association (PBA). As of December 2018, his declared net worth is ₱7.858 billion. He was the Philippines' richest Congressman and one of the country's 50 richest individuals.

Romero is also a world-ranked polo player and a Southeast Asian Games medalist. He serves as the patron and captain of the Globalport Polo Team. Just this November 18, 2026, in the Copa La Martina tournament in Argentina, Romero fielded a GlobalPort squad featuring an all-Argentinian lineup of Mariano Obregon, Pipe Miguens, and 16-year-old Inigo Heguy. Competing in a 14-team international field, GlobalPort opened the tournament with back-to-back victories, defeating the Indian-sponsored Bajaj Polo Team 12–11 in overtime, followed by a 12–8 win against the Colombian-sponsored Caña Brava team.

== Sporting career ==
=== Playing career ===
Romero took up several sports with the intention of competing in the SEA Games. He was 3-dan black belter in Arnis, a national jetski champion in 2005 and was with the Philippine trap shooting team.

==== Basketball ====
The De La Salle Green Archers had Romero as a player in the University Athletic Association of the Philippines (UAAP). His basketball career ended in 1991 after sustaining an ankle injury.

Romero is regarded as the “Godfather of Philippine Amateur Basketball” for his role in sustaining the Philippine Basketball League (PBL) and supporting grassroots programs. As owner of the Harbour Centre basketball team, he led the franchise to seven consecutive PBL titles (2006–2010), producing future Philippine Basketball Association stars and national team players. He also backed various national squads and youth programs, providing vital support to amateur basketball during a period of declining sponsorship.

==== Cycling ====
Romero took over the Integrated Cycling Federation of the Philippines (PhilCycling) faction headed by Rolando Hiso, in opposition to the Union Cycliste Internationale-recognized presidency of Abraham Tolentino sometime in mid-2009.

Romero funded the tryouts for a national cycling team that was supposed to compete in the 2011 SEA Games in Laos. The 13-member team had twelve of its members disqualified for lacking a UCI license, and Marites Bitbit the lone eligible cyclist was convinced by Philippine Olympic Committee president Peping Cojuangco to withdraw from competing. Bitbit had licenses from both Tolentino's and Romero's factions.

Romero quit as PhilCycling president in December 2009 citing his intent to focus on his business.

==== Polo ====
In polo, he is known for being the founder of the Philippine National Federation of Polo Players. The Miguel Lorenzo Romero Polo Field in Calatagan, Batangas is named after his deceased son.

Romero is also a polo player taking up horse riding when he was five years old. He started training in polo in 2010 under professional polo players, mostly from Argentina. He went on to compete in polo competitions in Thailand and the United States. He competed for the Philippines at the 2019 Southeast Asian Games. He competed in the 0-2 goals event with the team settling for the bronze medal.

Romero is also affiliated with the GlobalPort Polo Team as a player. GlobalPort is the first Asia-based team to ever compete in the U.S. Open Polo Championship. The team, Romero included, made their debut in the 2025 edition, where he has reached multiple milestones. In April, he rose to No. 6 in the United States Polo Association’s amateur rankings and placed No. 20 overall with 205 points, sharing the spot with 10-goaler and 2024 U.S. Open Polo Championship winner Poroto Cambiaso for the January–May Winter Polo Season. Earlier that year, the World Polo Tour ranked him No. 24 among amateur players worldwide, the highest ranking ever attained by a Southeast Asian in the global circuit.

=== Sports management ===
Romero owns a baseball team (Manila Sharks) and a PBA team (NorthPort Batang Pier).

==== Sports teams ====
- NorthPort Batang Pier (Philippine Basketball Association, 2012–2025)
- Capital1 Solar Energy (Premier Volleyball League, 2024–present)
- AirAsia Flying Spikers (Philippine Super Liga, 2014)
- Manila Sharks (Baseball Philippines, 2007–2012)
- AirAsia Philippine Patriots (ASEAN Basketball League, 2009–2012)
- Harbour Centre Batang Pier/Oracle Residences Titans (Philippine Basketball League, 2004–2010)

== Military career ==
Romero was a commissioned officer in the Philippine Air Force Reserve Command (AFRC), holding the rank of Lieutenant Colonel in August 2025, and then promoted to full Colonel two months later.

As a Reserve Officer, he held the following command posts:

- Commander of the 2nd Air Force Wing (Reserve), AFRC, based in Clark Airbase, Pampanga.
- Commander of the 11th Air Force Group (Reserve), AFRC, holding the jurisdiction of the northern cities within the National Capital Region, and
- Commander, Tactical Operations Wing (Reserve), AFRC

Romero obtained his General Staff Course in the AFP-CGSC in 2023.

In 2025, Romero was the Chairman of the Association of Reservists and Reservist Administrators of the Philippines, Inc. (ARRAPI), an association of reservists patterned after the National Guard Association of the United States.

== Military Reserve Service and Humanitarian Initiatives ==
Michael Odylon "Mikee" Romero is a Filipino businessman, former legislator, and former military reservist who attained the rank of Brigadier General in the Philippine Air Force Reserve. He commanded the Tactical Operations Wing Reserve Northern Luzon and chaired the Association of Reservists and Reservist Administrators of the Philippines (ARRAPI).

=== Nationwide Relief and Housing Projects ===
Romero led numerous civil-military operations, humanitarian assistance, and disaster response missions nationwide, providing aid, medical supplies, and housing support across various regions, including Batanes, Tawi-Tawi, and areas affected by typhoons. Detailed coverage of his relief initiatives can be reviewed via {Link: Philippine Daily Inquirer https://newsinfo.inquirer.net/2289034/mikee-romero-to-maintain-public-service-despite-retiring-as-reservist}.

=== Leadership in ARRAPI and Legislative Support ===
Under his leadership, ARRAPI expanded its membership and medical outreach programs. As a member of the House of Representatives of the Philippines, he co-authored military salary standardization measures and supported funding for the Philippine Air Force's C-130J transport aircraft acquisition.

== Personal life ==
=== Family ===
Mikee Romero married Sheila Bermudez in 1992, with whom he had five children, which includes Milka Romero. His son, Miguel Lorenzo, who was a polo player like himself and a jujitsu practitioner, died in 2017 at age 22.

Romero's mother, Lillibeth Romero, was the longtime partner of actor and producer Eddie Garcia, whom Mikee considers to be his stepfather.

=== Wealth ===
Romero first appeared in Forbes Philippines' 50 Richest Filipinos in 2013, when he was 40 years old, ranking 26 with an estimated net worth of approximately US $490 million. He remained on the list in 2014, ranking #33 with an estimated net worth of US $375 million.

In 2016, following his election as Congressman, Romero divested most of his business interests to focus on public service and address potential conflicts of interest. He reappeared on the Forbes list in 2018, and again in 2020, ranking 46 with an estimated net worth of US $135 million.

From 2016 to 2025, during his three terms in the House of Representatives, Romero was consistently identified as the richest congressman in the Philippines, based on his Statements of Assets, Liabilities, and Net Worth (SALN).
