= Arrest: Pat. Rizal Alih – Zamboanga Massacre =

1989 film starring Ramon Revilla and Eddie Garcia

- Official movie poster
- Directed by: Carlo J. Caparas
- Written by: Carlo J. Caparas; Tony Mortel
- Starring: Ramon Revilla; Vilma Santos; Eddie Garcia; Marianne Dela Riva
- Cinematography: Ramon Marcelino
- Edited by: Rene Tala
- Music by: Demet Velasquez
- Production companies: The Golden Lions Productions; EG Productions
- Release date: March 8, 1989
- Country: Philippines
- Language: Filipino

Arrest: Pat. Rizal Alih – Zamboanga Massacre (marketed as Arrest: Patrolman Risal Alih – Zamboanga Massacre) is a 1989 Filipino action film directed by comic book writer Carlo J. Caparas and written by Caparas and Tony Mortel. It stars Ramon Revilla as the titular patrolman, alongside Vilma Santos, Eddie Garcia, Marianne Dela Riva, Paquito Diaz, Raoul Aragonn, Baldo Marro, Charlie Davao, and Rosemarie Gil. Based on the Camp Cawa-Cawa siege in January 1989, the film was written and shot within the span of two months, receiving criticism from the chief of the Civil Relations Service of the Armed Forces of the Philippines who faulted it as "premature" and potentially inappropriate. Zamboanga Massacre was released by The Golden Lions Productions on March 8, 1989. Caparas considers Zamboanga Massacre to be among the films of which he is the proudest.

The real Alih only became aware of the film's existence in 2011 while in prison at Camp Crame, and the year after he filed a libel complaint against Caparas and his wife, executive producer Donna Villa, for maligning his reputation. The case was ultimately dismissed by the Quezon City Prosecutor's Office as the prescription period for filing charges had already expired.

The film is streaming online on YouTube.

== Plot ==
In 1984, Zamboanga City Mayor Cesar Climaco is murdered, and patrolman Rizal Alih is detained for his suspected involvement in the crime. In January 1989, Alih and his men take over Camp Cawa-Cawa, the military base where they were held, and hold Brigadier General Eduardo Batalla and Colonel Romeo Abendan hostage. After several shooting confrontations with the Philippine military, Alih ultimately beheads Gen. Batalla, and successfully escapes from the military base.

== Cast ==
- Ramon Revilla as Pat. Rizal Alih
- Vilma Santos as Jocelyn, Rizal's fifth wife
- Eddie Garcia as Brig. Gen. Eduardo Batalla
- Marianne Dela Riva as Evelyn Batalla, wife of Brig. Gen. Eduardo
- Paquito Diaz
- Raoul Aragonn as Colonel Romeo Abendan
- Baldo Marro as Idris
- Charlie Davao as General Renato de Villa
- Rosemarie Gil
- Dick Israel as Nasim
- Rez Cortez
- Robin Padilla
- Conrad Poe
- Roy Alvarez as Major Refe
- Tony Carreon
- Ruben Rustia as Mayor Cesar Climaco
- Joonee Gamboa
- Rocco Montalban
- Joko Diaz
- Mervin Samson
- Rey Venus
- Manny Doria
- Robert Miller
- Danny Riel
- Bebeng Amora
- Danny Labra

== Production ==
The Golden Lions Production acquired the adaptation rights to the Camp Cawa-Cawa siege in January 1989, the same month that the incident occurred. The film's working title was Batalla-Alih Encounter: Zamboanga Massacre. According to director and co-writer Carlo J. Caparas in 2009, he was already shooting the film even as the siege was ongoing, as he wanted the scenes to be "really fresh".

=== Casting ===
In January 1989, director Carlo J. Caparas cast Vilma Santos, the highest-paid film actress in the Philippines at the time, for the role of Rizal Alih's wife, after Santos had to decline a role in Caparas' previous film Celestina Sanchez, Alyas Bubbles – Enforcer: Ativan Gang (commonly shortened to Bubbles). Her scenes were allegedly shot in only one day.

=== Controversy ===
Honesto Isleta, chief of the Civil Relations Service, Armed Forces of the Philippines (CRSAFP), criticized the film's production in late January 1989 for being "premature", as the Philippine military presumed that the actual Rizal Alih could still be alive. In addition, Isleta stated that Ramon Revilla, an established action star, would be inappropriate portraying Alih as the protagonist of the story. However, Isleta would admit that the military could not halt the film's production, so they would instead refuse to lease its equipment and firearms to the film crew.

Santanina Rasul, a Philippines senator who was part of the unsuccessful negotiations for releasing General Batalla, appealed to the filmmakers to have a balanced depiction of Alih in the film. Manuel Morato, chairman of the Movie and Television Review and Classification Board (MTRCB), later stated that though his agency could not impede the film's production, it would closely supervise it so as to avoid the glorification of Alih in the work.

== Release ==
Zamboanga Massacre was graded "A" by the MTRCB, indicating a "Very Good" quality. The film was released by The Golden Lions Productions on March 8, 1989. Actor Roy Alvarez's agents, however, complained about the posters made for the film for not placing Alvarez's name above the title, arguing that his recent recognition in the internationally co-produced television film A Dangerous Life warrants a higher billing for the actor. Caparas later considered the film to be among the directorial works which he is most proud, alongside Pieta, Kahit Ako'y Lupa, and Bubbles.

== Reaction of Rizal Alih and lawsuit ==
In November 2011, while the former renegade policeman Rizal Alih was serving his prison sentence at Camp Crame, he found out about the existence of Zamboanga Massacre for the first time from a prison officer who mentioned it to him. Alih later watched the film from the officer's laptop, and felt "so shocked, speechless and angry" that he could not finish the viewing; the film depicted him as having beheaded General Batalla, which he stated as "utterly baseless, malicious and a downright lie perpetrated in order to make the movie such a big hit".

A year later, Alih filed a libel complaint against director Caparas and his wife, executive producer Donna Villa, arguing that the filmmakers prioritized making "a huge profit at the expense of maligning my name and reputation". The case was dismissed by the Quezon City Prosecutor's Office, however, as the prescription period for filing charges had lapsed after more than two decades since the film's release. Alih later died in prison on August 14, 2015.
