= Camp Cawa-Cawa siege =

1989 siege

- Date: 3 – 5 January 1989
- Location: Camp Cawa-Cawa, Zamboanga City, Philippines; 6°55′17.4″N 122°4′44.4″E
- Caused by: Hostage-taking of a police general and his aide by a renegade policeman
- Goals: Philippine security forces attempted to end ensuing siege.
- Result: A 3-day siege ensued, ending in an assault by government forces during which the camp burned down, killing more than a dozen people.; Police general, his aide and other hostages killed.; Rizal Alih, principal instigator of the incident, escaped.

Parties
Philippines	Muslim Renegade policeman and others

Lead figures
(Philippines) Brig. Gen. Eduardo Batalla (executed) (Philippines) Col. Romeo Abendan †	Rizal Alih

Number
Unknown	Approximately 8 hostage-takers

Casualties and losses
20 hostages killed	Unknown
- Location within Philippines

The Camp Cawa-Cawa siege (Filipino: Pagkubkob sa Kampo Cawa-Cawa, Cebuano: Paglikos sa Kampo Cawa-Cawa, Chavacano: Sitio de Campo Cawa-Cawa, Tausug: Gubat ha Kampu Kawa-Kawa) was a siege of a Philippine Constabulary-Integrated National Police camp by security forces of the Philippines on January 3–5, 1989, after a rogue policeman took the camp's ranking officer hostage.

== Events ==
Rizal Alih, a patrolman, and several other men had been detained pending an investigation into their alleged involvement in the murder of Zamboanga City Mayor Cesar Climaco on 14 November 1984. Gen. Eduardo Batalla, the regional commander of the PC-INP who had his office at the camp, had made a decision to have the detained men transferred to Manila; however, Alih refused to cooperate. Batalla had summoned the men to his office for a conference, but the talks degenerated into a heated exchange with both parties shouting at each other. Eight Muslim policemen led by Patrolman Rizal Alih took Batalla, Abendan along with numerous others hostage. Rizal Alih and his men were said to be Muslim separatist mutineers.

After a 3-day siege, Chief of Staff of the Armed Forces of the Philippines Renato de Villa ordered that the camp be assaulted. Philippine security forces decided to attack the camp using helicopters. Rockets deployed from the aircraft set fire to the building where Gen. Batalla was being held and it burned to the ground. Batalla, Abendan and 18 other PC/INP personnel were said to be executed by the "Moro band" and found scorched. Alih managed to escape the ruined camp, making his way to Basilan and eventually Sabah, Malaysia.

== Aftermath ==
Alih was arrested by 69 Commando from Royal Malaysia Police on July 21 1994 in Sandakan, Sabah and charged with illegal possession of firearms. He was extradited back to the Philippines in 2006. He was detained in Camp Crame and died in the camp's hospital on 14 August 2015 after complaining of chest pains. He was buried the next day in Zamboanga City.

== Commemoration ==
The Philippine National Police commemorates the deaths of Gen. Batalla and Col. Abendan every year. Camp Cawa-Cawa itself was renamed Camp Brigadier General Eduardo B. Batalla, and another Philippine National Police camp in Mercedes, Zamboanga City was named Camp Colonel Romeo A. Abendan in honor of the slain police officers.

== In popular culture ==
A film depicting the siege, Arrest: Pat. Rizal Alih – Zamboanga Massacre, was released on March 8, 1989. Directed by Carlo J. Caparas, it stars Ramon Revilla as Rizal Alih and Eddie Garcia as Brig. Gen. Eduardo Batalla.
