= 2025 Zamboanga City local elections =

Philippine election

2025 Zamboanga City local election
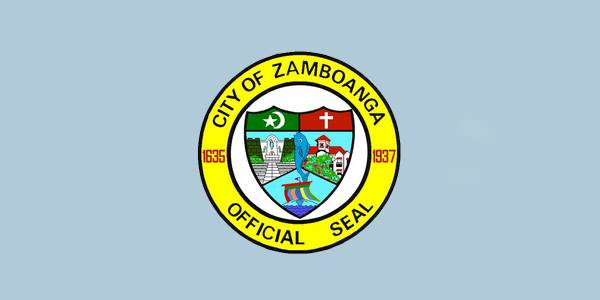
- Mayoral election
- May 12, 2025
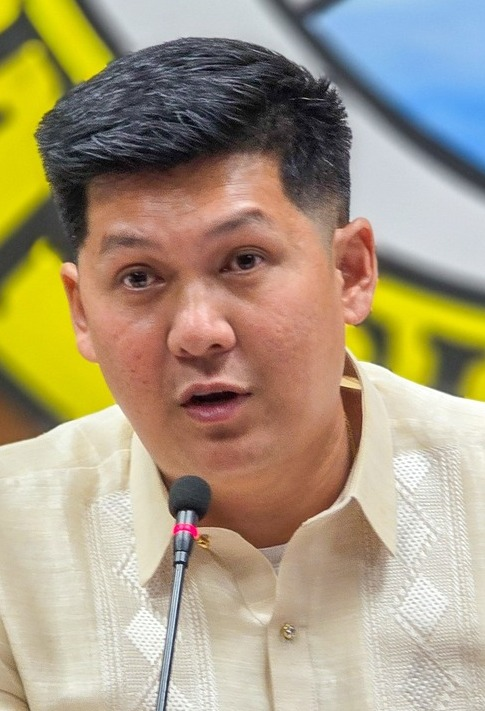

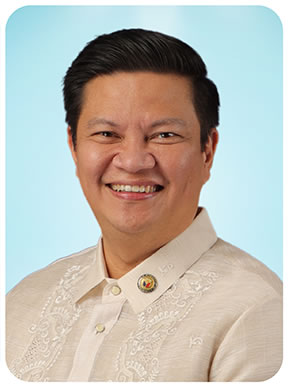
Nominee	Khymer Adan Olaso	Mannix Dalipe
Party	Nacionalista	Lakas
Running mate	Beng Climaco (AZAP)	Vino Guingona (Lakas)
Popular vote	169,345	122,036
Percentage	35.06	25.26
Mayor before election
John Dalipe
Lakas
Elected mayor
Khymer Adan Olaso
Nacionalista
- Vice mayoral election
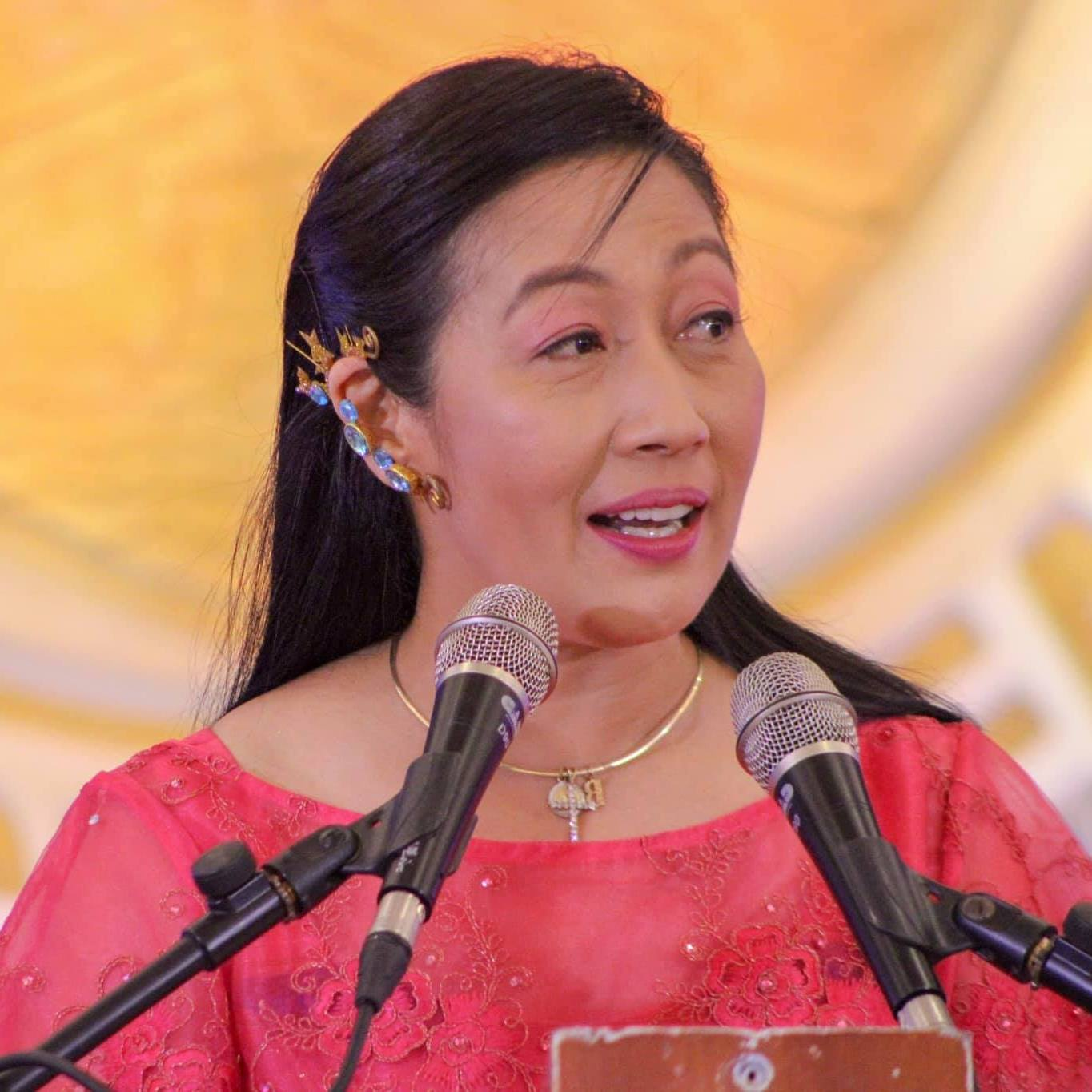

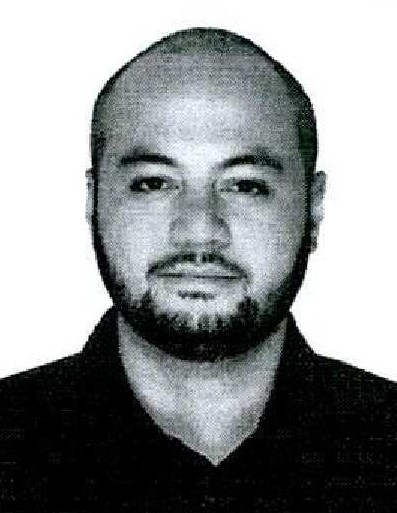
Nominee	Beng Climaco	Vino Guingona
Party	AZAP	Lakas
Popular vote	216,261	119,826
Percentage	44.76	24.81
Vice Mayor before election
Pinpin Pareja
PAZ
Elected Vice Mayor
Beng Climaco
AZAP

Local elections were held in Zamboanga City on May 12, 2025, within the Philippine general election. The voters elected for the elective local posts in the city: the mayor, vice mayor, and eight councilors per district.

== Congressional elections ==
The Congressional elections we're also held to elect a member to represent their constituent in their respective legislative districts. The Zamboanga City 1st District, and 2nd District

=== 1st district ===
Incumbent Khymer Adan Olaso of the Nacionalista Party retired to run for mayor of Zamboanga City.

The Nacionalista Party nominated Olaso's brother, Kaiser Adan Olaso, who was defeated by Kat Chua, an independent. Zamboanga City vice mayor Pinpin Pareja (Lakas–CMD) and Al Abduhalim (Independent) also ran for representative.

Candidate	Party	Votes	%
Kat Chua	Independent	54,444	34.53
Pinpin Pareja	Lakas–CMD	53,381	33.86
Kaiser Adan Olaso	Nacionalista Party	46,706	29.62
Al Abduhalim	Independent	3,140	1.99
Total		157,671	100.00
Valid votes		157,671	92.25
Invalid/blank votes		13,255	7.75
Total votes		170,926	100.00
Registered voters/turnout		224,316	76.20
Independent gain from Nacionalista Party			
Source: Commission on Elections

=== 2nd district ===
Term-limited incumbent Mannix Dalipe of Lakas–CMD ran for mayor of Zamboanga City.

Lakas–CMD nominated Dalipe's brother, Zamboanga City mayor John Dalipe, who was defeated by Zamboanga City Liga ng mga Barangay president Jerry Perez of the Adelante Zamboanga Party. Three other candidates also ran for representative.

Candidate	Party	Votes	%
Jerry Perez	Adelante Zamboanga Party	100,035	53.93
John Dalipe	Lakas–CMD	66,763	35.99
Michelle Natividad	Partido Demokratiko Pilipino	15,639	8.43
Darlene Sali	Independent	1,594	0.86
Ander Ismael	Independent	1,473	0.79
Total		185,504	100.00
Valid votes		185,504	92.06
Invalid/blank votes		16,003	7.94
Total votes		201,507	100.00
Registered voters/turnout		258,742	77.88
Adelante Zamboanga Party gain from Lakas–CMD			
Source: Commission on Elections

== Mayoral elections ==
=== Mayor ===
Incumbent Mayor John Dalipe of Lakas–CMD ran for the House of Representatives in Zamboanga City's 2nd legislative district. He was previously affiliated with the People's Reform Party.

Lakas–CMD nominated Dalipe's brother, representative Mannix Dalipe, who was defeated by representative Khymer Adan Olaso of the Nacionalista Party. Three other candidates ran for mayor.

On April 22, 2025, Orlando San Luis Negrete, an independent candidate, was found dead inside his home in Barangay Tumaga.

Candidate	Party	Votes	%
Khymer Adan Olaso	Nacionalista Party	169,345	47.49
Mannix Dalipe	Lakas–CMD	122,336	34.31
Pete Natividad	Independent	62,035	17.40
Dennier Ibbah	Independent	1,544	0.43
Orlando Negrete	Independent	1,326	0.37
Total		356,586	100.00
Valid votes		356,586	95.75
Invalid/blank votes		15,847	4.25
Total votes		372,433	100.00
Registered voters/turnout		483,058	77.10
Nacionalista Party gain from Lakas–CMD			
Source: Commission on Elections

== Vice Mayoral elections ==
=== Vice Mayor ===
Incumbent Pinpin Pareja of Lakas–CMD ran for the House of Representatives in Zamboanga City's 1st legislative district. She was previously affiliated with Partido Prosperidad y Amor Para na Zamboanga.

Lakas–CMD nominated city councilor Vino Guingona, who was defeated by former Zamboanga City mayor Beng Climaco of the Adelante Zamboanga Party. Sophia Taup (Independent) also ran for mayor.

Candidate	Party	Votes	%
Beng Climaco	Adelante Zamboanga Party	216,261	62.88
Vino Guingona	Lakas–CMD	119,826	34.84
Sophia Taup	Independent	7,857	2.28
Total		343,944	100.00
Valid votes		343,944	92.35
Invalid/blank votes		28,489	7.65
Total votes		372,433	100.00
Registered voters/turnout		483,058	77.10
Adelante Zamboanga Party gain from Lakas–CMD			
Source: Commission on Elections

== City Council elections ==
The Zamboanga City Council is composed of 19 councilors, 16 of whom are elected.

Lakas–CMD tied with the Adelante Zamboanga Party at six seats each.

Party	Votes	%	Seats	+/–
Lakas–CMD	834,555	38.14	6	+5
Adelante Zamboanga Party	685,654	31.33	6	+4
Nacionalista Party	212,469	9.71	2	New
Partido Federal ng Pilipinas	20,525	0.94	0	0
Katipunan ng Kamalayang Kayumanggi	5,347	0.24	0	New
Independent	429,822	19.64	2	+2
Total	2,188,372	100.00	16	0
Total votes	372,433	–		
Registered voters/turnout	483,058	77.10		
Source: Commission on Elections

=== 1st district ===
Zamboanga City's 1st councilor district consists of the same area as Zamboanga City's 1st legislative district. Eight councilors are elected from this councilor district.

20 candidates were included in the ballot.

Candidate	Party	Votes	%
Mel Sadain	Nacionalista Party	98,028	9.80
Lit-Lit Macrohon (incumbent)	Independent	86,807	8.68
Dan Vicente (incumbent)	Adelante Zamboanga Party	77,338	7.73
Joel Esteban (incumbent)	Adelante Zamboanga Party	65,215	6.52
King Omaga (incumbent)	Lakas–CMD	62,311	6.23
Vladimir Jimenez	Nacionalista Party	62,371	6.24
Bong Atilano	Lakas–CMD	59,804	5.98
Divino Gracia Ramillano	Adelante Zamboanga Party	55,015	5.50
Jawo Jimenez	Lakas–CMD	53,697	5.37
Mike Cinco	Nacionalista Party	52,070	5.21
Boday Cabato	Lakas–CMD	48,165	4.82
Joey Santos (incumbent)	Lakas–CMD	44,489	4.45
Charlie Mariano (incumbent)	Lakas–CMD	44,322	4.43
Jackie Julian	Adelante Zamboanga Party	42,203	4.22
Gerky Valesco (incumbent)	Lakas–CMD	39,108	3.91
Poloy Olvinar	Lakas–CMD	36,339	3.63
Ruiz delos Santos	Independent	24,741	2.47
Ben Asdali	Partido Federal ng Pilipinas	20,525	2.05
Matthew Hosseini	Independent	15,317	1.53
Benji Diones	Independent	12,073	1.21
Total		999,938	100.00
Total votes		170,926	–
Registered voters/turnout		224,316	76.20
Source: Commission on Elections

=== 2nd district ===
Zamboanga City's 2nd councilor district consists of the same area as Zamboanga City's 2nd legislative district. Eight councilors are elected from this councilor district.

29 candidates were included in the ballot.

Candidate	Party	Votes	%
James Siason (incumbent)	Lakas–CMD	80,740	6.79
BG Guingona	Adelante Zamboanga Party	79,778	6.71
Jihan Edding (incumbent)	Lakas–CMD	77,059	6.48
Kim Villaflores	Lakas–CMD	66,062	5.56
Junnie Navarro	Lakas–CMD	58,253	4.90
Hannah Nuño	Adelante Zamboanga Party	57,718	4.86
Fred Atilano (incumbent)	Adelante Zamboanga Party	56,343	4.74
Rey Bayoging	Independent	55,027	4.63
Mary Joy Olaso	Adelante Zamboanga Party	53,186	4.48
Albert Castillo	Adelante Zamboanga Party	53,088	4.47
Cesar Iturralde	Adelante Zamboanga Party	51,972	4.37
Mike Alavar	Independent	50,610	4.26
Kim Elago	Independent	50,562	4.25
Eddie Saavedra (incumbent)	Adelante Zamboanga Party	49,522	4.17
Hecky Perez	Lakas–CMD	48,534	4.08
Bong Simbajon	Adelante Zamboanga Party	44,276	3.73
Banjung Aliangan	Lakas–CMD	42,633	3.59
VP Elago (incumbent)	Lakas–CMD	40,048	3.37
Chard Pajarito	Lakas–CMD	32,991	2.78
Al Warid Adjail	Independent	25,378	2.14
Ibs Turabin	Independent	24,847	2.09
Sonyboy Jalani	Independent	21,070	1.77
Jon Perez	Independent	20,018	1.68
Floyd Dizon	Independent	11,062	0.93
Rawda Nasaluddin	Independent	10,422	0.88
Nur-Aisa Awis	Independent	9,737	0.82
Armando Bucoy	Independent	6,509	0.55
Daniel Mendoza	Independent	5,642	0.47
Jesse Toribio	Katipunan ng Kamalayang Kayumanggi	5,347	0.45
Total		1,188,434	100.00
Total votes		201,507	–
Registered voters/turnout		258,742	77.88
Source: Commission on Elections
