= 2019 Zamboanga City local elections =

Philippine election

2019 Zamboanga City local election
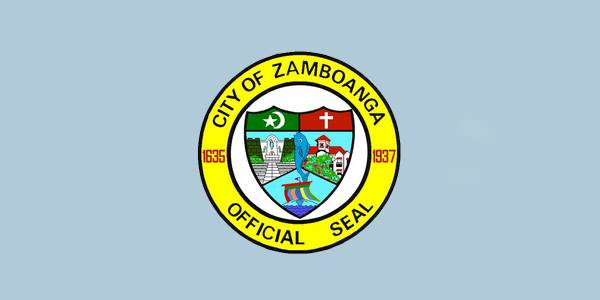
- Registered: 467,535
- Turnout: 61.28%
- Mayoral election
- May 13, 2019
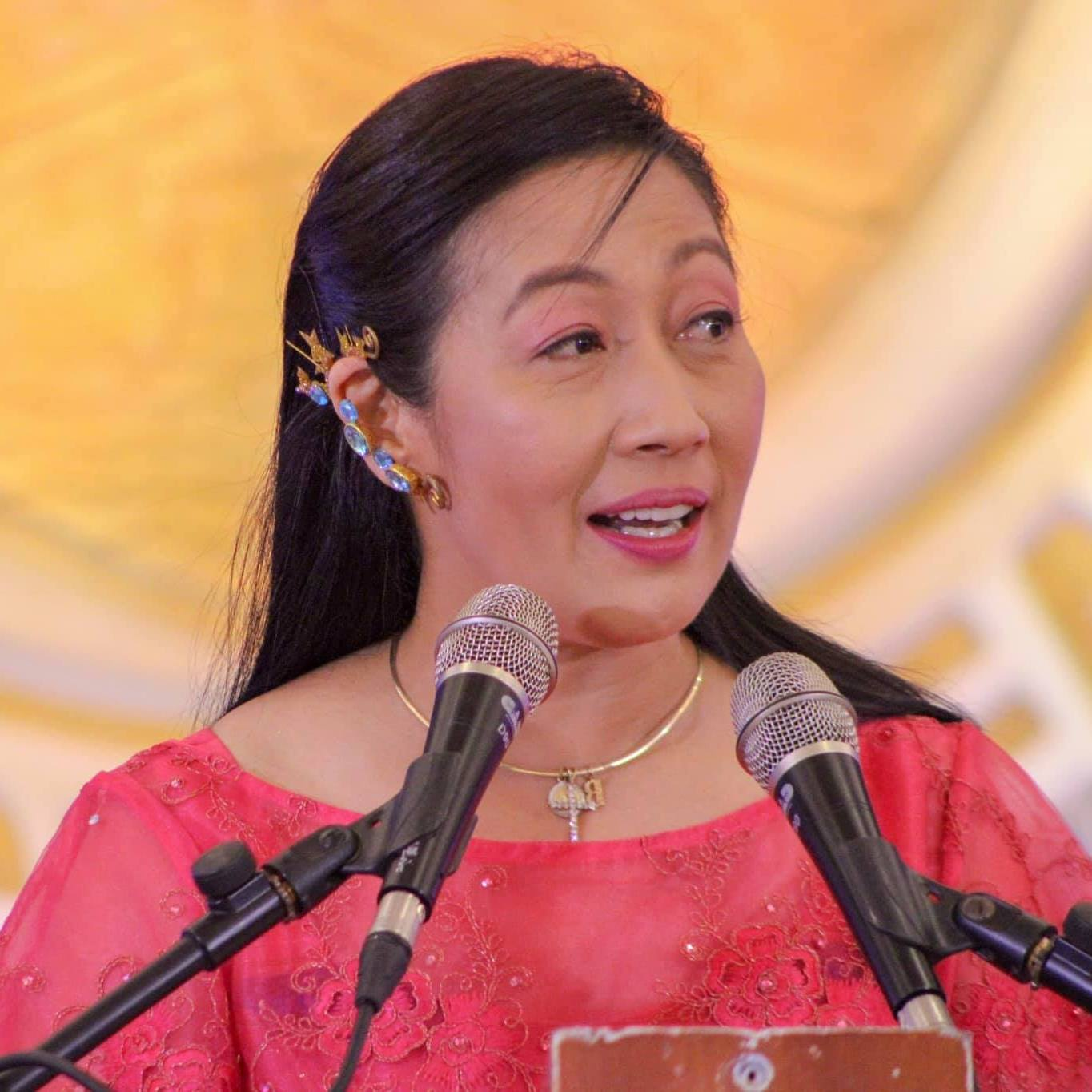

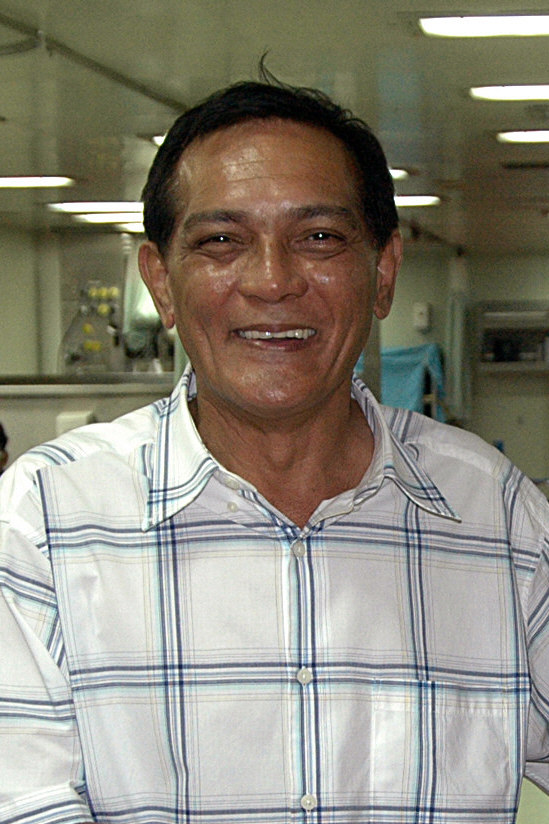
Nominee	Beng Climaco-Salazar	Celso Lobregat
Party	Liberal	PDP–Laban
Running mate	Rommel Agan (UNA)	Melchor Rey Sadain
Popular vote	140,362	107,621
Percentage	53.66%	41.14%
- A map showing the results of the Zamboanga City mayoral election by barangay
Mayor before election
Maria Isabelle Climaco Salazar
Liberal
Elected mayor
Maria Isabelle Climaco Salazar
Liberal
- Vice mayoral election
	UNA	PDP	PDDS
Nominee	Rommel Agan	Melchor Sadain	Roel Natividad
Party	UNA	PDP–Laban	PDDS
Popular vote	104,976	101,360	44,655
Percentage	41.82%	40.38%	17.79%
- A map showing the results of the Zamboanga City vice mayoral election by barangay
Vice Mayor before election
Cesar Itturalde
Independent
Elected Vice Mayor
Rommel Agan
UNA

Local elections were held in Zamboanga City on May 13, 2019, within the Philippine general election. The voters elected for the elective local posts in the city: the mayor, vice mayor, and eight councilors per district.

== Retiring and term-limited elective officials ==
- Cesar Iturralde, incumbent Vice-Mayor, term-limited in 2019
- Rodolfo Bayot, incumbent District I councilor, term-limited in 2019
- Rommel Agan, incumbent District II councilor, term-limited in 2019

== Candidates ==
Notes:

- **bold** means the candidate is incumbent and running for reelection on the same post;
- italic means the candidate previously run last 2016 election either on the same post or other posts;
- **bold and italic** means the candidate is an incumbent and is running for another position.

Position		Team Climaco Coalition		Team Colorao Coalition		Partido Federal ng Pilipinas		Pederalismo ng Dugong Dakilang Samahan		Other parties		Independents
Mayor		Liberal	**Beng Climaco**	PDP–Laban	**Celso Lobregat**	PFP	Sukarno Ikbala	PDDS	Christopher Miguel			Danilo Guevara; Nur Sahibul
Vice Mayor		UNA	**Rommel Agan**	PDP–Laban	Melchor Sadain			PDDS	Roel "Elong" Natividad			
Member of the House of Representatives	1st	NPC	Cesar Jimenez, Jr.	AZAP^{1}	Jose Lobregat			PDDS	Taib Nasaron	NUP	**Rodolfo Bayot**	Cesar Climaco, Jr.; Daniel Nuevo; Wendell Sotto
Member of the House of Representatives	2nd	NPC	**Manuel Jose Dalipe**	Nacionalista	Lilia Macrohon-Nuño							Erico Basilio Fabian; **Cesar Iturralde**; Jonathan Perez
Elected Members of the Zamboanga City Council	1st	Liberal	**Elbert Atilano**; **Josephine Pareja**	PDP–Laban	**Marxander Jaime "Boday" Cabato**; Pilarica Ledesma; **Rodolfo Lim**; Haj Sandag	PFP	Nur-Aisa Awis; Ibnohajar Binang; Crisanto "Monsi" dela Cruz^{2}; Edris Lim; Rey Modillas; Jerson Monteverde; Wakil Tanjilil	PDDS	Abdulnasir Ablayan; Jemar Barahim; Nelson Bautista; Regino Tanduyan, Jr.; Marlon Torres			Shada dela Torre; Edward Ducay; Manuel Englis; Nader Jalani; Querubin Ramallosa
Elected Members of the Zamboanga City Council	1st	PAZ^{3}	Joel Esteban; **Cesar Jimenez, Sr.**; Rikki Lim; King Omaga; Mohammad Ali Urao	LDP	Luis Biel III; **Joselito Macrohon**; **Rogelio Valesco**	PFP	Nur-Aisa Awis; Ibnohajar Binang; Crisanto "Monsi" dela Cruz^{2}; Edris Lim; Rey Modillas; Jerson Monteverde; Wakil Tanjilil	PDDS	Abdulnasir Ablayan; Jemar Barahim; Nelson Bautista; Regino Tanduyan, Jr.; Marlon Torres			Shada dela Torre; Edward Ducay; Manuel Englis; Nader Jalani; Querubin Ramallosa
Elected Members of the Zamboanga City Council	1st	PFP	Crisanto "Monsi" dela Cruz^{2}	AZAP^{1}	Khymer Adan Olaso	PFP	Nur-Aisa Awis; Ibnohajar Binang; Crisanto "Monsi" dela Cruz^{2}; Edris Lim; Rey Modillas; Jerson Monteverde; Wakil Tanjilil	PDDS	Abdulnasir Ablayan; Jemar Barahim; Nelson Bautista; Regino Tanduyan, Jr.; Marlon Torres			Shada dela Torre; Edward Ducay; Manuel Englis; Nader Jalani; Querubin Ramallosa
Elected Members of the Zamboanga City Council	2nd	Liberal	**Teodyver Arquiza**; **Jimmy Villaflores**	PDP–Laban	Frederick Atilano; Vincent Paul Elago; **Benjamin Guingona IV**; Richard Mariano; **Lilibeth Nuño**; Mark Saavedra; Marlon Simbajon	PFP	Zayd Ocfemia	PDDS	Billy Girvan, Jr.; Isabel Gutierrez; Roel Natividad, Jr.			Ju-Ed Alvarez; Elijah John Inclan; Jade Jamolod
Elected Members of the Zamboanga City Council	2nd	UNA	**Al-Jihan Edding**; **Juan Climaco Elago II**	PDP–Laban	Frederick Atilano; Vincent Paul Elago; **Benjamin Guingona IV**; Richard Mariano; **Lilibeth Nuño**; Mark Saavedra; Marlon Simbajon	PFP	Zayd Ocfemia	PDDS	Billy Girvan, Jr.; Isabel Gutierrez; Roel Natividad, Jr.			Ju-Ed Alvarez; Elijah John Inclan; Jade Jamolod
Elected Members of the Zamboanga City Council	2nd	Lakas–CMD	John Dalipe; Samuel Natividad	LDP	**Miguel Alavar III**	PFP	Zayd Ocfemia	PDDS	Billy Girvan, Jr.; Isabel Gutierrez; Roel Natividad, Jr.			Ju-Ed Alvarez; Elijah John Inclan; Jade Jamolod
Elected Members of the Zamboanga City Council	2nd	APP^{4}	Hector Perez; Eduardo Saavedra	LDP	**Miguel Alavar III**	PFP	Zayd Ocfemia	PDDS	Billy Girvan, Jr.; Isabel Gutierrez; Roel Natividad, Jr.			Ju-Ed Alvarez; Elijah John Inclan; Jade Jamolod

Notes

^{1} Adelante Zamboanga Party

^{2} Dela Cruz is also a guest candidate of Team Climaco Coalition.

^{3} Partido Prosperidad y Amor para na Zamboanga

^{4} Aggrupation of Parties for Progress

== Results ==
The candidates for district representative, mayor, and vice mayor, with the highest number of votes, wins the seat; they are voted separately, therefore they may be of different parties when elected.

=== House of Representatives election ===
==== 1st District ====
Incumbent Congressman Celso Lobregat ran for Mayor against former ally, Beng Climaco.

2019 Philippine House of Representatives election at Zamboanga City's 1st district
Party	Candidate	Votes	%	±%
NPC	Cesar Jimenez, Jr.	37,099	31.44%	N/A
AZAP	Jomar Lobregat	28,605	24.23%	N/A
NUP	Rodolfo Bayot	27,626	23.41%	N/A
Independent	Cesar Climaco	14,308	12.12%	N/A
Independent	Wendell Sotto	6,684	5.66%	N/A
PDDS	Taib Nasaron	3,051	2.58%	+0.98%
Independent	Daniel Nuevo	635	0.53%	N/A
Total votes		118,008	100.0%	
NPC gain from PDP–Laban				

==== 2nd District ====
District II Representative Manuel Jose Dalipe ran for reelection against former Congresswoman Lilia Macrohon-Nuño, former Congressman Erbie Fabian, and outgoing Vice-Mayor Cesar Iturralde.

2019 Philippine House of Representatives election at Zamboanga City's 2nd district
Party	Candidate	Votes	%	±%
NPC	Mannix Dalipe (incumbent)	77,521	60.98%	+5.68%
Nacionalista	Lilia Macrohon-Nuño	30,395	23.91%	−15.29%
Independent	Cesar Iturralde	11,250	8.84%	N/A
Independent	Erbie Fabian	5,929	4.66%	N/A
Independent	Jonathan Perez	2,025	1.59%	N/A
Total votes		127,120	100.00%	
NPC hold				

=== Mayoral elections ===
Incumbent Mayor Beng Climaco ran for reelection for her third and final term.

2019 Zamboanga City mayoral election
Party	Candidate	Votes	%	±%
Liberal	Beng Climaco (incumbent)	140,362	53.66%	−15.94%
PDP–Laban	Celso Lobregat	107,621	41.14%	N/A
PFP	Sukarno Ikbala	11,938	4.56%	N/A
PDDS	Christopher Miguel	857	0.32%	N/A
Independent	Danilo Guevara	761	0.29%	N/A
Total votes		261,539	100.00%	
Liberal hold				

=== Vice-mayoral elections ===
Incumbent and outgoing Vice-Mayor Cesar Iturralde ran for the congressional seat in District II. All candidates for vice-mayor were either incumbent or former city councilors.

2019 Zamboanga City Vice Mayoral Election
Party	Candidate	Votes	%	±%
UNA	Rommel Agan	104,976	41.82%	N/A
PDP–Laban	Melchor Rey Sadain	101,360	40.38%	+9.98%
PDDS	Roel Natividad	44,655	17.79%	N/A
Total votes		250,991	100.00%	
UNA gain from Independent				

=== City Council elections ===
Each of Zamboanga City's two legislative districts elects eight councilors to the City Council. The eight candidates with the highest number of votes wins the seats per district.

2019 Zamboanga City Council election
- May 13, 2019

All 8 seats from each of Zamboanga City's two legislative districts 10 seats needed for a majority
	Majority party	Minority party	Third party
Leader	Celso Lobregat	Beng Climaco	Rommel Agan
Party	PDP–Laban	Liberal	UNA
Alliance	Team Colorao	Team Climaco	Team Climaco
Leader's seat	1st District	1st District	2nd District
Seats before	4	4	2
Seats won	3	3	2
Seat change	▼1	▼1	Steady
	Fourth party	Fifth party	Sixth party
Leader	Jomar Lobregat	Cesar Jimenez, Sr.	John Dalipe
Party	AZAP	PAZ	Lakas
Alliance	Team Colorao	Team Climaco	Team Climaco
Leader's seat	1st District	1st District	2nd District
Seats before	0	1	0
Seats won	1	2	1
Seat change	▲1	▲2	▲1
	Seventh party	Eighth party	Ninth party
Leader	Eduardo Saavedra	Miguel Alavar III	Sukarno Ikbala
Party	APP	LDP	PFP
Alliance	Team Climaco	Team Colorao	PFP
Leader's seat	2nd District	2nd District	2nd District
Seats before	0	3	0
Seats won	0	3	1
Seat change	Steady	Steady	▲1

Party	Party leader	Total votes		Total seats	
Party	Party leader	Total	%	Total	%
PDP–Laban	Celso Lobregat				
Liberal	Beng Climaco				
UNA	Rommel Agan				
AZAP	Jomar Lobregat				
PAZ	Cesar Jimenez, Sr.				
Lakas	John Dalipe				
APP	Eduardo Saavedra				
LDP	Miguel Alavar III				
PFP	Sukarno Ikbala				
Independents	Varies			0	0.0%
Total valid votes cast			N/A		
Total turnout					
Total partisan seats				16	84.2%
Seat for Association of Barangay Captains President				1	5.2%
Seat for Association of Sangguniang Kabataan chairmen President				1	5.2%
Seat for Mandatory Representative for Indigenous Peoples				1	5.2%
Total non-partisan seats				3	15.7%
Total seats				19	100.0%

==== 1st District ====
Council election at Zamboanga City's 1st district
Party	Candidate	Votes	%	±%
Liberal	Josephine Pareja (incumbent)	75,546	8.81%	
Liberal	Elbert Atilano (incumbent)	61,638	7.19%	
AZAP	Khymer Adan Olaso	54,644	6.37%	
LDP	Joselito Macrohon (incumbent)	54,050	6.30%	
LDP	Rogelio Valesco (incumbent)	52,516	6.12%	
PAZ	Cesar Jimenez, Sr. (incumbent)	50,673	5.91%	
PFP	Crisanto "Monsi" dela Cruz	50,558	5.89%	
PAZ	King Omaga	47,240	5.51%	
PDP–Laban	Rodolfo Lim (incumbent)	46,363	5.41%	
PDP–Laban	Marxander Jaime Cabato (incumbent)	46,276	5.39%	
LDP	Luis Biel III	38,863	4.53%	
PAZ	Joel Esteban	37,345	4.35%	
PDP–Laban	Pilarica Ledesma	31,784	3.70%	
PAZ	Mohammad Ali Urao	28,070	3.27%	
PDDS	Marlon Torres	22,266	2.59%	
PAZ	Rikki Lim	20,054	2.34%	
PFP	Wakil Tanjilil	19,713	2.30%	
PDP–Laban	Haj Sandag	16,485	1.92%	
PFP	Edris Lim	12,840	1.49%	
Independent	Nader Jalani	11,088	1.29%	
PFP	Rey Modillas	10,414	1.21%	
PDDS	Jemar Barahim	9,253	1.07%	
Independent	Edward Ducay	8,267	0.96%	
PDDS	Abdulnasir Ablayan	8,219	0.95%	
PDDS	Nelson Bautista	7,809	0.91%	
PFP	Jerson Monteverde	6,861	0.80%	
PFP	Ibnohajar Binang	6,847	0.79%	
PFP	Sisang Awis	6,664	0.77%	
Independent	Shada dela Torre	5,085	0.59%	
Independent	Manuel Englis	3,810	0.44%	
Independent	Querubin Ramallosa	3,434	0.40%	
PDDS	Regino Tanduyan, Jr.	2,293	0.26%	
Total votes		856,968	100.00%	

==== 2nd District ====
Council election at Zamboanga City's 2nd district
Party	Candidate	Votes	%	±%
Lakas	John Dalipe	85,745		
PDP–Laban	Benjamin Guingona IV (incumbent)	66,819		
UNA	Juan Climaco Elago II (incumbent)	64,548		
PDP–Laban	Lilibeth Nuño (incumbent)	60,819		
LDP	Miguel Alavar III (incumbent)	60,430		
UNA	Al-Jihan Edding (incumbent)	59,798		
Liberal	Jimmy Villaflores (incumbent)	58,341		
PDP–Laban	Vincent Paul Elago	50,603		
APP	Eduardo Saavedra	50,345		
PDP–Laban	Frederick Atilano	45,538		
PDP–Laban	Richard Mariano	41,868		
PDP–Laban	Marlon Simbajon	39,089		
Liberal	Teodyver Arquiza (incumbent)	38,875		
PDP–Laban	Mark Saavedra	36,572		
APP	Hector Perez	32,886		
PDDS	Roel Natividad, Jr.	27,094		
Lakas	Samuel Natividad	23,458		
Independent	Jade Jamolod	8,780		
PFP	Zayd Ocfemia	8,472		
Independent	Ju-Ed Alvarez	6,870		
Independent	Elijah John Inclan	6,243		
PDDS	Isabel Gutierrez	4,816		
PDDS	Billy Girvan, Jr.	3,590		
Total votes				

== See also ==
- Philippine House of Representatives elections in the Zamboanga Peninsula, 2019
- 2019 Philippine general election
- 2022 Zamboanga City local elections
