= John Dalipe =

22nd Mayor of Zamboanga City (born 1984)

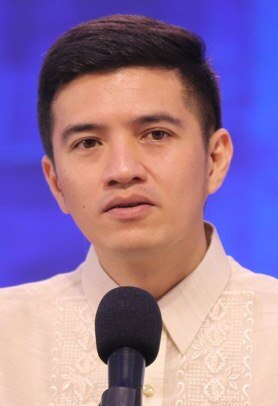
- Dalipe in 2023

22nd Mayor of Zamboanga City
- In office June 30, 2022 – June 30, 2025
- Vice Mayor: Josephine E. Pareja
- Preceded by: Beng Climaco
- Succeeded by: Khymer Adan Olaso

Member of the Zamboanga City Council from the 2nd district
- In office June 30, 2019 – June 30, 2022

Personal details
- Born: John Mendoza Dalipe; September 16, 1984 (age 42) Zamboanga City, Philippines
- Party: Lakas (2018–2021; 2024–present)
- Other political affiliations: PRP (2021–2024); UNA (2012–2018)
- Relations: Mannix (brother)
- Occupation: Politician
- Profession: Nurse

John Mendoza Dalipe (born September 16, 1984) is a Filipino politician and nurse who served as the 22nd mayor of Zamboanga City from 2022 to 2025. He previously served as a member of the Zamboanga City Council from Zamboanga City's 2nd district from 2019 to 2022.

Dalipe is a member of Lakas–CMD; he is the current regional chairman of the party for Zamboanga. Dalipe is the younger brother of former Zamboanga congressman Mannix.

== Early life ==
John Mendoza Dalipe was born on September 16, 1984, in Zamboanga City. His father, Manuel, was also a mayor of Zamboanga City during the 1980s, and his mother is Maria Rosario Dalipe (née Mendoza). Dalipe's elder brother, Mannix, was the majority floor leader of the House of Representatives of the Philippines from 2022 to 2025.

== Political career ==
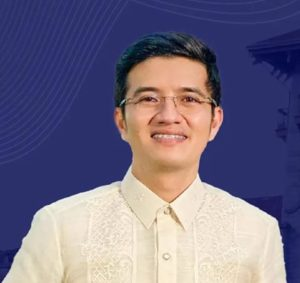
Official portrait, 2022

Dalipe served as Sangguniang Kabataan chairman and then barangay chairman of Tetuan until he ran for councilor of the Zamboanga City Council in the 2019 Zamboanga City local elections and won 1st place with 85,745 votes. Dalipe ran for Mayor of Zamboanga City under the People's Reform Party in the 2022 Zamboanga City local elections and defeated former mayor Celso Lobregat. Dalipe became the youngest person to assume the position of mayor. He was picked by President Bongbong Marcos to be the chairperson of the Regional Development Council (RDC) of Zamboanga. In the 2025 Zamboanga City local elections, Dalipe ran for house representative of Zamboanga City's 2nd congressional district to replace his brother Mannix, who was running to take his place; but both of them lost in their respective races.

== Electoral history ==
Electoral history of John Dalipe
Year	Office	Party	Votes Dalipe received				Result
Year	Office	Party	Total	%	P.	Swing	Result
2013	Councilor (Zamboanga City)	UNA	35,506	5.57%	9th	—N/a	Lost
2019	Councilor (Zamboanga City)	Lakas	85,745	—N/a	1st	—N/a	Won
2022	Mayor of Zamboanga City	PRP	130,940	40.36%	1st	—N/a	Won
2025	Representative (Zamboanga City-2nd)	Lakas	66,763	35.99%	2nd	—N/a	Lost
