= Mayor of Zamboanga City =

Local chief executive of Zamboanga City, Philippines

Mayor of Zamboanga City Alcalde del Ciudad de Zamboanga
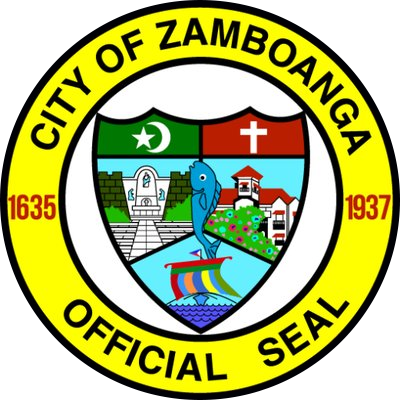
- Seal of the City of Zamboanga

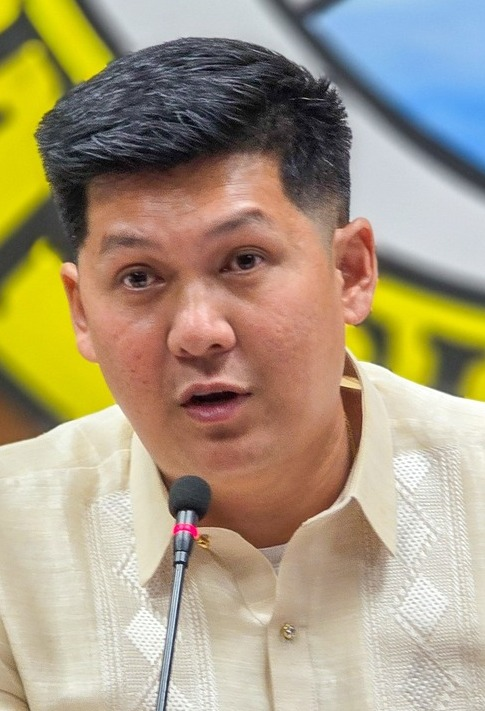
- Incumbent; Khymer Adan Olaso since June 30, 2025
- Style: The Honourable
- Seat: Zamboanga City Hall
- Appointer: Elected via popular vote
- Term length: 3 years, not eligible for re-election immediately after three consecutive terms
- Inaugural holder: Christopher Frederick Bader (as a City Commission); Nicasio Valderrosa (as a Chartered City)
- Formation: January 1, 1912 (as a City Commission)^{a} February 26, 1937 (as a Chartered City)^{b}
- Website: https://zamboangacity.gov.ph/citymayor/

Mayor of Zamboanga City
- 1. Upon the recommendation of the Governor of the Moro Province General John J. Pershing, the municipality of Zamboanga became a commissioned city by virtue of Moro Province Legislative Council Act 272 on January 1, 1912. It would later be reverted to a municipality status by 1914.; 2. On October 12, 1936, President Manuel Luis Quezon signed the City Charter of Zamboanga thus officially converting Zamboanga into a city since its reversion in 1914. The first city officials would be sworn in four months later on February 26, 1937.

The Mayor of Zamboanga City (Chavacano: Alcalde del Ciudad de Zamboanga) and (Filipino: Punong Lungsod ng Zamboanga) is the head of the executive branch of the Zamboanga City's government. The mayor holds office at Zamboanga City Hall. Like all local government heads in the Philippines, the mayor is elected via popular vote, and may not be elected for a fourth consecutive term (although the former mayor may return to office after an interval of one term). In case of death, resignation or incapacity, the vice mayor becomes the mayor.

== Functions and duties ==
The Local Government Code of 1991 outlines the functions and duties of the city mayor as follows:

- Exercise general supervision and control over all programs, projects, services, and activities of the city government;
- Enforce all laws and ordinances relative to the governance of the city and in the exercise of the appropriate corporate powers provided for under Section 22 of the Code, implement all approved policies, programs, projects, services and activities of the city;
- Initiate and maximize the generation of resources and revenues, and apply the same to the implementation of development plans, program objectives and priorities as provided for under Section 18 of the Code, particularly those resources and revenues programmed for agro-industrial development and countryside growth and progress;
- Ensure the delivery of basic services and the provision of adequate facilities as provided for under Section 17 of the Code;
- Exercise such other powers and perform such other duties and functions as may be prescribed by law or ordinance.

== History ==
The leadership of Zamboanga was in the hands of the commander of its Spanish garrison, Fort Pilar during the Spanish era.

When General Vicente Alvarez established Zamboanga as a sovereign republic, the leadership was vested upon its president.

Upon the firm establishment of American colonization and dissolution of the Republic in 1903, Zamboanga, as a municipality, was placed under the Moro Province, a semi-military government consisting of five districts: Zamboanga, Cotabato, Davao, Lanao and Sulu. During this period, Zamboanga hosted a number of American regional governors, including General John J. Pershing, who was military commander/governor of the Moro Province from 1909 to 1914.

On September 15, 1911, the Legislative Council of the Moro Province passed Act No. 272 converting the municipality into a city with a commission form of government but was amended to be effective on January 1, 1912. Frederick Christopher Bader was appointed mayor of the city. After Bader's term ended in 1914, Victoriano Tarrosa, a native Zamboangueño was appointed to replace him.

Upon the establishment of the Department of Mindanao and Sulu in 1914, Zamboanga City was reverted into a municipality run by a municipal president.

=== City Charter of 1936 ===
When the Commonwealth government was established in 1935, calls to convert Zamboanga into a city increased. On September 23, 1936, through Assemblyman Juan Alano, the National Assembly of the Philippines passed Commonwealth Act No. 39 making Zamboanga a chartered city consists of the present territorial jurisdiction of the municipality of Zamboanga, the municipality of Bolong, the municipal district of Taluksangay, the whole island of Basilan and the adjacent islands, i.e., the municipality of Isabela, the municipal district of Lamitan, and the municipal district of Maluso. It was later signed by President Manuel Quezon on October 12, 1936.

The charter made Zamboanga City as the largest city in the world in terms of land area. The charter also called for a government headed by a city mayor to be appointed by the President of the Philippines; and a city council to be composed of the city engineer, city treasurer, three elective councilors and two appointive councilors.

In a jubilant celebration held outside the City Hall, the new city government was formally inaugurated on February 26, 1937. Nicasio Valderrosa was appointed as mayor while Doroteo Karagdag, Agustin Natividad, Santiago Varela, Faustino Macaso and Pedro Cuevas, Jr. was appointed as councilors.

=== Commonwealth of the Philippines ===
==== Nicasio Siason Valderrosa (1937-1939) ====
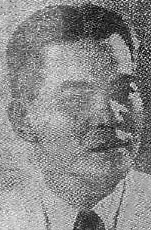
Nicasio Valderrosa

Although born in Bacolod, Negros Occidental on October 11, 1891, Nicasio Valderrosa spent most of his career in Western Mindanao, mainly in Zamboanga and Basilan. In 1930, he was appointed Secretary and Treasurer of the province of Zamboanga and served until his appointment as mayor in 1937.

At this time, the city mayor is directly appointed by the President of the Philippines. During his term, he was known for transferring the Moro village from the thriving tourist spot of Cawa-Cawa Boulevard to its present location in Campo Islam. He also constructed the road network in Basilan.

In 1939, Mayor Valderrosa on the request of President Quezon, was assigned to the newly created chartered city of Baguio, which was experiencing administrative problems as a fledgling city. He became also Basilan's first city mayor when it separated from Zamboanga in 1948.

The street that passes through the Zamboanga City Hall is named in honor of Mayor Valderrosa.

==== Pablo Rojas Lorenzo (1939-1940) ====
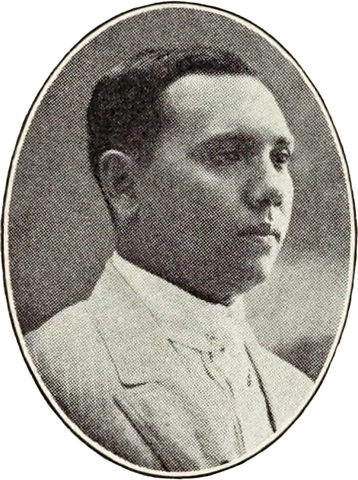
Pablo Lorenzo

Pablo Lorenzo, born in 1887, was the son of a Spanish sergeant. Elected to the Philippine House of Representatives and to the 1934 Constitutional Convention representing Zamboanga, Lorenzo was appointed as city mayor in place of Valderrosa who was sent to Baguio in 1939. However, his term was cut short when in 1940, President Manuel Quezon appointed as Immigration Commissioner. He is known to be the father of the first woman mayor of the city, Maria Clara Lobregat.

He also served as Secretary of Education under President Elpidio Quirino and Secretary of Public Works and Communications under President Diosdado Macapagal.

The street that passes from Gateway Mall all through the Zamboanga City Port is named in honor of Mayor Lorenzo.

==== Agustin Luceo Alvarez (1940-1942) ====
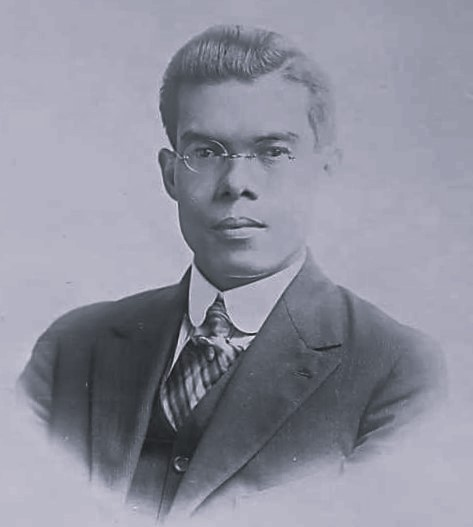
Agustín Luceo Álvarez

A native Zamboangueño, Agustin Alvarez was appointed Governor of Zamboanga Province in 1917 until 1922. He would later be appointed city mayor in 1940 until his resignation due to poor health in 1942.

==== Gregorio Eijasantos Ledesma (1945-1946) ====
A well-known politician before World War II, Gregorio Ledesma was appointed as governor of the areas that remained free of the Japanese during the war. Immediately after the war, the government of Zamboanga City was left in disarray and disorganized. The Allied liberators were reluctant in appointed local leaders who were associated with the Japanese until Ledesma stood out as a Japanese resistance leader during the war. Because of such prominence, he was appointed Mayor in 1945 and tasked to restore and rebuild the war-ravaged city. Ledesma immediately appoint qualified civilian officers to fill important offices in the local government. He would only serve until 1946.

He returned to politics in 1958 to run for the city council but lost. However, he would be appointed to the council when a seat became vacant. He died on September 4, 1966, at the age of 73.

=== Third Republic of the Philippines ===
==== Pantaleon Pelayo (1946-1947) ====
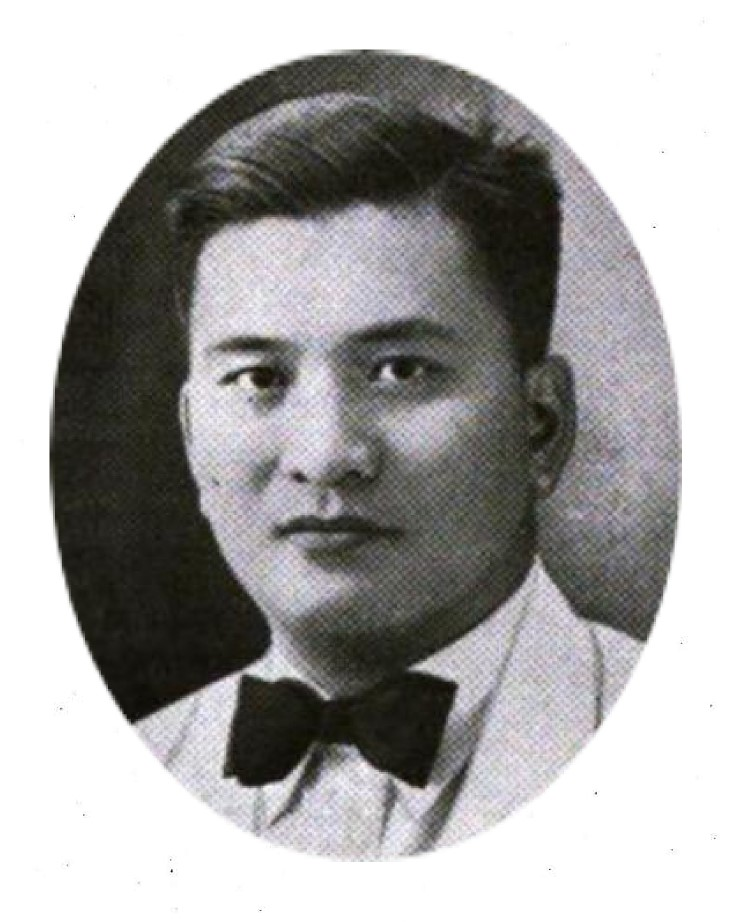
Pantaleon Pelayo

A well-known lawyer of Davao City yet born and grew up in Zamboanga, Pantaleon Pelayo first entered politics when he was elected to the 1934 Constitutional Convention representing Davao City.

During the proceedings, Pelayo thundered the session floor by denouncing vast lands owned by the Japanese in Davao City. At that time, Davao was nicknamed Davaoaka or the little Tokyo of the Philippines because the Japanese had virtual control of the best agricultural lands and influence in local politics. Many thought it would be his downfall but was redeemed when the Convention inserted a provision limiting the landholdings of the Japanese contained in Article 13, Section 5:

"Save in cases of hereditary succession, no private agricultural land shall be transferred or assigned except to individuals, corporation, or associations qualified to acquire or hold lands of the public domain in the Philippines."

Pelayo's exposé caused Secretary of Agriculture and Natural Resources Eulogio Rodriguez to order a full investigation of the Japanese landholdings in Mindanao which resulted in the cancellation of leases of public agricultural lands which were cultivated and developed by the Japanese.

Subsequently, President Manuel Luis Quezon appointed him mayor of Davao in October 1940 which he served until World War II came to the country in 1941. He took an active participation in the guerilla activities against the Japanese in Mindanao.

When Davao was liberated, he was immediately called to reorganize its local government. A few months later, President Sergio Osmeña sent him to Zamboanga and appointed him as City Mayor in 1945 to reorganize also its civil government there. Yet he served for only one year when President Osmeña was defeated for reelection in 1946 by Senate President Manuel Roxas. He then returned to Davao City for his law practice.

== List ==
The first column consecutively numbers the individuals who have served as chief executive (either mayor or municipal president) of Zamboanga City, while the second column consecutively numbers the individuals who have served as city mayor.

#		Image	Name (Birth-Death)	Took office	Left office	Party	Vice Mayor	Term	Era
1	1		Christopher Frederick Bader	January 2, 1912	February 28, 1914	Appointed	None	-	Insular Government
2	2		Victoriano Tarrosa	March 1, 1914	October 15, 1914	Appointed	None	-	Insular Government
Abolished; Leadership was transferred to the Municipal President upon the reversion of the city to municipality status under the province of Zamboanga. Please refer to the next table									Insular Government
8	3		Nicasio Valderrosa (1891-1968)	February 27, 1937	1939	Appointed	None	-	Commonwealth
9	4		Pablo Lorenzo (1887-1967)	1939	1940	Appointed	None	-	Commonwealth
10	5		Agustin Alvarez (1890-1946)	1940	1942	Appointed	None	-	Commonwealth
Abolished; Leadership was transferred to the Municipal President when the Japanese administration reverted Zamboanga's status as a city to a municipality. Please refer to the next table									Second Republic
(5)	6		Gregorio Ledesma (1893–1966)	1945	1946	Appointed	None	-	Commonwealth (Restored)
12	7		Pantaleon Pelayo (1901-1963)	1945	1946	Appointed	None	-	Third Republic
13	8		Vicente Suarez	1946	1947	Appointed	None	-	Third Republic
14	9		Manuel Jaldon	1947	1949	Appointed	None	-	Third Republic
15	10		Cesar Climaco (1916-1984)	December 30, 1953	March 1, 1954	Appointed	None	1	Third Republic
16	11		Hector Suarez	March 1, 1954	January 1, 1956	Appointed	None	1	Third Republic
16	11		Hector Suarez	March 1, 1954	January 1, 1956	Appointed	Tabujur Taupan	1	Third Republic
(15)	(10)		Cesar Climaco (1916-1984)	January 1, 1956	January 1, 1960	Liberal	Tomas Ferrer	2	Third Republic
(15)	(10)		Cesar Climaco (1916-1984)	January 1, 1960	December 30, 1961	Liberal	Tomas Ferrer	3	Third Republic
17	12		Tomas Ferrer (1906-1995)	December 30, 1961	January 1, 1964	Liberal	Vacant	1	Third Republic
17	12		Tomas Ferrer (1906-1995)	December 30, 1961	January 1, 1964	Liberal	Joaquin F. Enriquez Jr.	1	Third Republic
(16)	(11)		Hector Suarez	January 1, 1964	January 1, 1968	Nacionalista	Joaquin F. Enriquez Jr.	2	Third Republic
(16)	(11)		Hector Suarez	January 1, 1964	January 1, 1968	Nacionalista	Expedito Fernandez	2	Third Republic
18	13		Joaquin F. Enriquez Jr. (1926-1986)	January 1, 1968	January 1, 1972	Liberal	Roberto Lim	1	Third Republic
18	13		Joaquin F. Enriquez Jr. (1926-1986)	January 1, 1972	September 23, 1972	Independent	Jose Vicente Atilano II	2	Third Republic
18	13		Joaquin F. Enriquez Jr. (1926-1986)	September 23, 1972	1978	KBL	Jose Vicente Atilano II	3	Martial Law Era "The New Society"
19	14		Jose Vicente Atilano II	1978	1980	KBL	Abolished	1	Martial Law Era "The New Society"
(15)	(10)		Cesar Climaco (1916-1984)	March 5, 1980	June 30, 1981	Concerned Citizen's Aggrupation	Manuel Dalipe	4	Martial Law Era "The New Society"
(15)	(10)		Cesar Climaco (1916-1984)	June 30, 1981	November 14, 1984	Concerned Citizen's Aggrupation	Manuel Dalipe	4	Fourth Republic
20	15		Manuel Dalipe (1946- )	November 14, 1984	February 25, 1986	KBL	Susan delos Reyes	1	Fourth Republic
20	15		Manuel Dalipe (1946- )	February 25, 1986	March 25, 1986	KBL	Susan delos Reyes	1	Fifth Republic
21	-		Rustico Varela (1922-1993)	March 25, 1986	June 1, 1986	Appointed	Susan delos Reyes	-	Fifth Republic
22	-		Julio Cesar Climaco (1944- )	June 1, 1986	May 28, 1987	Appointed	Susan delos Reyes	-	Fifth Republic
23	-		Vitaliano Agan (1935-2009)	May 28, 1987	February 2, 1988	Appointed	Susan delos Reyes	-	Fifth Republic
24	16		Vitaliano Agan (1935-2009)	February 2, 1988	June 30, 1992	Lakas	Jose Climaco	1	Fifth Republic
24	16		Vitaliano Agan (1935-2009)	June 30, 1992	June 30, 1995	Lakas	Roberto Ko	2	Fifth Republic
24	16		Vitaliano Agan (1935-2009)	June 30, 1995	March 23, 1998	Lakas	Efren Arañez	3	Fifth Republic
25	17		Efren Arañez (1938-2020)	March 23, 1998	June 30, 1998	Lakas	Vacant	-	Fifth Republic
26	18		Maria Clara Lobregat (1921-2004)	June 30, 1998	June 30, 2001	LDP	Roberto Ko	1	Fifth Republic
26	18		Maria Clara Lobregat (1921-2004)	June 30, 2001	January 2, 2004	LDP	Erbie Fabian	2	Fifth Republic
27	19		Erbie Fabian (1957- )	January 4, 2004	June 30, 2004	LDP	Vacant	-	Fifth Republic
28	20		Celso L. Lobregat (1948- )	June 30, 2004	June 30, 2007	LDP	Maria Isabelle Climaco	1	Fifth Republic
28	20		Celso L. Lobregat (1948- )	June 30, 2007	June 30, 2010	LDP	Mannix Dalipe	2	Fifth Republic
28	20		Celso L. Lobregat (1948- )	June 30, 2010	June 30, 2013	LDP	Cesar Iturralde	3	Fifth Republic
29	21		Beng Climaco (1966- )	June 30, 2013	June 30, 2016	Liberal	Cesar Iturralde	1	Fifth Republic
29	21		Beng Climaco (1966- )	June 30, 2016	June 30, 2019	Liberal	Cesar Iturralde	2	Fifth Republic
29	21		Beng Climaco (1966- )	June 30, 2019	June 30, 2022	Liberal	Rommel Agan	3	Fifth Republic
30	22		John Dalipe (1984- )	June 20, 2022	June 30, 2025	PRP	Josephine E. Pareja	1	Fifth Republic
31	23		Khymer Adan T. Olaso (1978- )	June 20, 2025	Incumbent	Nacionalista	Maria Isabelle Climaco	1	Fifth Republic

== Elections ==
- 1955 Zamboanga City mayoral election
- 1959 Zamboanga City mayoral election
- 1963 Zamboanga City mayoral election
- 1967 Zamboanga City mayoral election
- 1971 Zamboanga City mayoral election
- 1980 Zamboanga City mayoral election
- 1988 Zamboanga City local elections
- 1992 Zamboanga City local elections
- 1995 Zamboanga City local elections
- 1998 Zamboanga City local elections
- 2001 Zamboanga City local elections
- 2004 Zamboanga City local elections
- 2007 Zamboanga City local elections
- 2010 Zamboanga City local elections
- 2013 Zamboanga City local elections
- 2016 Zamboanga City local elections
- 2019 Zamboanga City local elections
- 2022 Zamboanga City local elections
- 2025 Zamboanga City local elections

== Vice mayor of Zamboanga City ==
The Vice Mayor is the second-highest official of the city. The vice mayor is elected via popular vote; although most mayoral candidates have running mates, the vice mayor is elected separately from the mayor. This can result in the mayor and the vice mayor coming from different political parties.

The Vice Mayor is the presiding officer of the Zamboanga City Council, although he can only vote as the tiebreaker. When a mayor is removed from office, the vice mayor becomes the mayor until the scheduled next election.

Former mayor Maria Isabelle Climaco is the incumbent Vice Mayor since 2025.

== See also ==
- Mayor of Manila
- Local government in the Philippines
