= Zamboanga City's 1st congressional district =

Legislative district of the Philippines

- Constituency for the House of Representatives of the Philippines
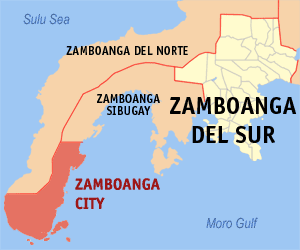
- Location of Zamboanga City within the Zamboanga Peninsula
- City: Zamboanga City
- Region: Zamboanga Peninsula
- Population: 448,390 (2020)
- Electorate: 224,316 (2025)
- Major settlements: 38 barangays: Barangays; Ayala; Bagong Calarian; Baliwasan; Baluno; Cabatangan; Camino Nuevo; Campo Islam; Canelar; Capisan; Cawit; Dulian (Upper Pasonanca); La Paz; Labuan; Limpapa; Maasin; Malagutay; Mariki; Pamucutan; Pasonanca; Patalon; Recodo; Rio Hondo; San Jose Cawa-Cawa; San Jose Gusu; San Roque; Santa Barbara; Santa Maria; Santo Niño; Sinubung; Sinunuc; Talisayan; Tulungatung; Tumaga; Zone 1; Zone 2; Zone 3; Zone 4
- Area: 211.21 km^{2} (81.55 sq mi)

Current constituency
- Created: 2004
- Representative: Katrina Reiko Chua-Tai
- Political party: Independent
- Congressional bloc: Majority

Zamboanga City's 1st congressional district is one of the two congressional districts of the Philippines in Zamboanga City. It has been represented in the House of Representatives since 2007. It was created by the 2004 reapportionment that divided the city into two congressional districts and which took effect in 2007. The district is composed of 38 barangays in the city's west coast and includes most of its downtown commercial core. It is currently represented in the 20th Congress by Katrina Reiko Chua-Tai, an independent.

== Representation history ==
#	Image	Member	Term of office		Congress	Party	Electoral history	Constituent LGUs
#	Image	Member	Start	End	Congress	Party	Electoral history	Constituent LGUs
=== Zamboanga City's 1st district for the House of Representatives of the Philippines ===
District created March 19, 2004 from Zamboanga City's at-large district.
1		Beng Climaco	June 30, 2007	June 30, 2013	14th	Liberal	Elected in 2007.	2007–present Ayala, Bagong Calarian, Baliwasan, Baluno, Cabatangan, Camino Nuevo, Campo Islam, Canelar, Capisan, Cawit, Dulian (Upper Pasonanca), La Paz, Labuan, Limpapa, Maasin, Malagutay, Mariki, Pamucutan, Pasonanca, Patalon, Recodo, Rio Hondo, San Jose Cawa-Cawa, San Jose Gusu, San Roque, Santa Barbara, Santa Maria, Santo Niño, Sinubung, Sinunuc, Talisayan, Tulungatung, Tumaga, Zone 1, Zone 2, Zone 3, Zone 4
1		Beng Climaco	June 30, 2007	June 30, 2013	15th	Liberal	Re-elected in 2010.	2007–present Ayala, Bagong Calarian, Baliwasan, Baluno, Cabatangan, Camino Nuevo, Campo Islam, Canelar, Capisan, Cawit, Dulian (Upper Pasonanca), La Paz, Labuan, Limpapa, Maasin, Malagutay, Mariki, Pamucutan, Pasonanca, Patalon, Recodo, Rio Hondo, San Jose Cawa-Cawa, San Jose Gusu, San Roque, Santa Barbara, Santa Maria, Santo Niño, Sinubung, Sinunuc, Talisayan, Tulungatung, Tumaga, Zone 1, Zone 2, Zone 3, Zone 4
2		Celso Lobregat	June 30, 2013	June 30, 2019	16th	LDP	Elected in 2013.	2007–present Ayala, Bagong Calarian, Baliwasan, Baluno, Cabatangan, Camino Nuevo, Campo Islam, Canelar, Capisan, Cawit, Dulian (Upper Pasonanca), La Paz, Labuan, Limpapa, Maasin, Malagutay, Mariki, Pamucutan, Pasonanca, Patalon, Recodo, Rio Hondo, San Jose Cawa-Cawa, San Jose Gusu, San Roque, Santa Barbara, Santa Maria, Santo Niño, Sinubung, Sinunuc, Talisayan, Tulungatung, Tumaga, Zone 1, Zone 2, Zone 3, Zone 4
2		Celso Lobregat	June 30, 2013	June 30, 2019	17th	PDP–Laban	Re-elected in 2016.	2007–present Ayala, Bagong Calarian, Baliwasan, Baluno, Cabatangan, Camino Nuevo, Campo Islam, Canelar, Capisan, Cawit, Dulian (Upper Pasonanca), La Paz, Labuan, Limpapa, Maasin, Malagutay, Mariki, Pamucutan, Pasonanca, Patalon, Recodo, Rio Hondo, San Jose Cawa-Cawa, San Jose Gusu, San Roque, Santa Barbara, Santa Maria, Santo Niño, Sinubung, Sinunuc, Talisayan, Tulungatung, Tumaga, Zone 1, Zone 2, Zone 3, Zone 4
3		Cesar L. Jimenez Jr.	June 30, 2019	June 30, 2022	18th	PDP–Laban	Elected in 2019.	2007–present Ayala, Bagong Calarian, Baliwasan, Baluno, Cabatangan, Camino Nuevo, Campo Islam, Canelar, Capisan, Cawit, Dulian (Upper Pasonanca), La Paz, Labuan, Limpapa, Maasin, Malagutay, Mariki, Pamucutan, Pasonanca, Patalon, Recodo, Rio Hondo, San Jose Cawa-Cawa, San Jose Gusu, San Roque, Santa Barbara, Santa Maria, Santo Niño, Sinubung, Sinunuc, Talisayan, Tulungatung, Tumaga, Zone 1, Zone 2, Zone 3, Zone 4
4		Khymer Adan T. Olaso	June 30, 2022	June 30, 2025	19th	AZAP	Elected in 2022.	2007–present Ayala, Bagong Calarian, Baliwasan, Baluno, Cabatangan, Camino Nuevo, Campo Islam, Canelar, Capisan, Cawit, Dulian (Upper Pasonanca), La Paz, Labuan, Limpapa, Maasin, Malagutay, Mariki, Pamucutan, Pasonanca, Patalon, Recodo, Rio Hondo, San Jose Cawa-Cawa, San Jose Gusu, San Roque, Santa Barbara, Santa Maria, Santo Niño, Sinubung, Sinunuc, Talisayan, Tulungatung, Tumaga, Zone 1, Zone 2, Zone 3, Zone 4
4		Khymer Adan T. Olaso	June 30, 2022	June 30, 2025	19th	Nacionalista	Elected in 2022.	2007–present Ayala, Bagong Calarian, Baliwasan, Baluno, Cabatangan, Camino Nuevo, Campo Islam, Canelar, Capisan, Cawit, Dulian (Upper Pasonanca), La Paz, Labuan, Limpapa, Maasin, Malagutay, Mariki, Pamucutan, Pasonanca, Patalon, Recodo, Rio Hondo, San Jose Cawa-Cawa, San Jose Gusu, San Roque, Santa Barbara, Santa Maria, Santo Niño, Sinubung, Sinunuc, Talisayan, Tulungatung, Tumaga, Zone 1, Zone 2, Zone 3, Zone 4
5		Katrina Reiko Chua-Tai	June 30, 2025	Incumbent	20th	Independent	Elected in 2025.	2007–present Ayala, Bagong Calarian, Baliwasan, Baluno, Cabatangan, Camino Nuevo, Campo Islam, Canelar, Capisan, Cawit, Dulian (Upper Pasonanca), La Paz, Labuan, Limpapa, Maasin, Malagutay, Mariki, Pamucutan, Pasonanca, Patalon, Recodo, Rio Hondo, San Jose Cawa-Cawa, San Jose Gusu, San Roque, Santa Barbara, Santa Maria, Santo Niño, Sinubung, Sinunuc, Talisayan, Tulungatung, Tumaga, Zone 1, Zone 2, Zone 3, Zone 4

== Election results ==
=== 2025 ===
Candidate	Party	Votes	%
Kat Chua	Independent	54,444	34.53
Pinpin Pareja	Lakas–CMD	53,381	33.86
Kaiser Adan Olaso	Nacionalista Party	46,706	29.62
Al Abduhalim	Independent	3,140	1.99
Total		157,671	100.00
Registered voters/turnout		224,316	–
Independent gain from Nacionalista Party			
Source: Commission on Elections

=== 2022 ===
Candidate	Party	Votes	%
Khymer Adan Olaso	Adelante Zamboanga Party	73,785	49.43
Beng Climaco	Partido Prosperidad y Amor Para na Zamboanga	55,829	37.40
Wendell Sotto	Lakas–CMD	13,679	9.16
Al Alibasa	Independent	2,630	1.76
Taib Nasaron	Independent	1,896	1.27
Sisang Awis	Partido Federal ng Pilipinas	1,448	0.97
Total		149,267	100.00
Total votes		164,444	–
Registered voters/turnout		214,276	76.74
Adelante Zamboanga Party gain from Nationalist People's Coalition			
Source: Commission on Elections

=== 2019 ===
2019 Philippine House of Representatives election at Zamboanga City's 1st district
Party	Candidate	Votes	%	±%
NPC	Cesar Jimenez, Jr.	37,099	31.44%	N/A
AZAP	Jomar Lobregat	28,605	24.23%	N/A
NUP	Rodolfo Bayot	27,626	23.41%	N/A
Independent	Cesar Climaco	14,308	12.12%	N/A
Independent	Wendell Sotto	6,684	5.66%	N/A
PDDS	Taib Nasaron	3,051	2.58%	+0.98%
Independent	Daniel Nuevo	635	0.53%	N/A
Total votes		118,008	100.0%	
NPC gain from PDP–Laban				

== See also ==
- Legislative districts of Zamboanga City
