= Kat Chua =

Filipino physician and politician

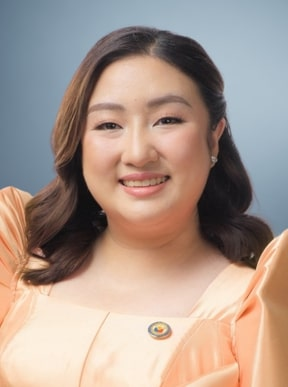
- Official portrait, 2025

Member of the House of Representatives of the Philippines from Zamboanga City's 1st District
- Incumbent
- Assumed office June 30, 2025
- Preceded by: Khymer Adan Olaso

Personal details
- Born: Katrina Reiko Chua; April 11, 1992 (age 34)
- Party: PFP (2025–present)
- Other political affiliations: Independent (2024–2025)
- Spouse: Joeben Tai

Katrina Reiko Chua-Tai (born April 11, 1992) is a Filipino politician who is a member of the House of Representatives. She has represented Zamboanga City's 1st congressional district since the 2025 elections.

== See also ==
- List of female members of the House of Representatives of the Philippines
