= Cesar Climaco =

Filipino lawyer and politician (1916–1984)

Cesar Cortes Climaco
- Climaco during senate campaign in 1963

10th Mayor of Zamboanga City
- In office March 5, 1980 – November 14, 1984
- Vice Mayor: Manuel A. Dalipe
- Preceded by: Jose Vicente Atilano II
- Succeeded by: Manuel A. Dalipe
- In office January 1, 1956 – December 30, 1961
- Vice Mayor: Tomas Ferrer
- Preceded by: Hector C. Suarez
- Succeeded by: Tomas Ferrer
- In office December 30, 1953 – March 1, 1954
- Preceded by: Manuel D. Jaldon
- Succeeded by: Hector C. Suarez

Commissioner of the Bureau of Customs
- In office 1962–1962
- President: Diosdado Macapagal
- Preceded by: Rolando G. Geotina
- Succeeded by: Norberto B. Romualdez Jr.

Mambabatas Pambansa (Assemblyman) from Zamboanga City
- In office June 30, 1984 – November 14, 1984

Member of the Zamboanga City Council
- In office December 30, 1951 – December 30, 1953

Personal details
- Born: February 28, 1916 Zamboanga, Philippine Islands
- Died: November 14, 1984 (aged 68) Zamboanga City, Philippines
- Party: Concerned Citizens' Aggrupation (1980–1984); UNIDO (1980–1984)
- Other political affiliations: Liberal (1956–1980)
- Spouse: Julia Florita (m. 1940)
- Education: University of Santo Tomas; University of the Philippines College of Law

Cesar Cortes Climaco (February 28, 1916 – November 14, 1984) was a Filipino lawyer and politician who served as mayor of Zamboanga City for 11 years over three nonconsecutive terms. A prominent critic of the martial law regime of Ferdinand Marcos, he was famed for his toughness in governance and colorful personality. He was also famous for his refusal to cut his hair until democratic rule was restored in the Philippines. He was assassinated by an unknown gunman in 1984.

== Early life and education ==
Climaco was born in Zamboanga City, the son of a customs broker who later became a municipal councilor. He finished his primary and secondary education in his hometown, then moved to Manila together with his future wife, Julia, to pursue a college education. He enrolled in a pre-law course at the University of Santo Tomas and worked as a family driver to finance his studies. He then studied law at the University of the Philippines College of Law, working at the same time as a janitor at the Court of Appeals. Coincidentally, his older brother Rafael, also a law student at UP, became an associate justice of the Court of Appeals under President Marcos. Climaco earned his law degree in 1941, and was admitted to the Philippine bar later that year after having passed the bar examinations.

== Political career ==
Climaco first entered political life when he ran and won a seat in the Zamboanga City Council in 1951. Within two years, at the age of 37, he would be appointed as mayor of Zamboanga City, holding the post until the following year.

In 1954, Climaco joined Operation Brotherhood, a group sponsored by the Jaycees to help provide medical and relief needs to refugees in war-torn Vietnam. As the project manager and field coordinator based in Vietnam, Climaco earned the friendship of South Vietnamese President Ngo Dinh Diem and found his activities covered by Life magazine.

During his campaign for the mayorship, the melody of "O My Darling, Clementine" was used in "Ay si Cesar, Ay si Cesar Climaco" sung in Chavacano. It was sung during his funeral in 1984. Coincidentally, "O my Darling Clementine" was the love song of Cesar Climaco to his wife, Julia Floreta-Climaco.

Climaco first won election as Zamboanga City mayor in 1956, as a candidate of the Liberal Party, and served in such capacity until 1961.

=== Mayor of Zamboanga City (1956–1959 and 1959–1961) ===
Climaco became a national figure during his first stint as Zamboanga City mayor. He became known for his personal courage, as shown by his willingness to venture alone out to hotspots and personally confront neighborhood toughs with threats of imprisonment. He maintained a similarly tough stance towards the city's policemen, once disarming cops he caught asleep at their posts during a surprise inspection. Climaco also maintained a harmonious relationship with the city's Muslim population, and cracked down on gambling.

As mayor, Climaco ordered the construction of Abong-Abong park in Pasonanca, which was planned to provide space for a camp site, housing projects, and a shantytown to house the city's homeless population. During this period, Zamboanga City earned the appellation as the cleanest city in the Philippines. One measure he enacted to earn such a reputation for his city was a directive requiring all horses in horse-drawn carriages to be tied with diapers beneath their tails as they plied their routes.

He struck a friendship with the mayor of Manila, Arsenio Lacson, who had earned a similar reputation for toughness and good governance. Climaco soon earned the nickname "Arsenio Lacson of the South", to which Lacson remarked that at the rate Climaco was going, the Manila mayor would soon be known as the "Climaco of the North".

=== Macapagal administration official ===
In 1961, Climaco gave up his post as mayor for an unsuccessful run for the Senate under the Liberal Party, in which he finished 12th. After his defeat, he was appointed by President Diosdado Macapagal as Commissioner of Customs. As Customs Commissioner, he brought in cadets from the Philippine Military Academy, vaunted for their idealism and honesty, to work in a Bureau of Customs which had long been reputedly corrupt. He again ran and lost for a Senate seat in 1963. Climaco was then appointed as a Presidential Assistant under Macapagal.

In 1965, Climaco tried for a third time to win election as a senator, but fell around 4,000 votes shy. In the same election, his political ally, President Macapagal, was defeated for re-election by a law school contemporary and friend of Climaco's, Senate President Ferdinand Marcos.

=== Martial law years ===
President Marcos declared martial law in 1972. Distressed at the development, Climaco left for exile to the United States He vowed never to cut his hair until democratic rule was restored in the country. He returned to the Philippines in 1976, and two years later, sought election to the Interim Batasang Pambansa as a member from Zamboanga. He was defeated in this effort.

=== Return as mayor (1980–1984) ===
In 1980, Climaco staged his political comeback when he won re-election as Zamboanga City mayor under the banner of a political party he had organized, the Concerned Citizen's Aggrupation. By that time, crime and violence, often at the hands of policemen and the military, had become prevalent in the city, and a frustrated Climaco posted a scoreboard in front of city hall listing a running tally of unsolved violent crimes in the city. Climaco did not hesitate in denouncing the military and the police in the city, and had the police chief transferred out of the city. Upon the outbreak of violent incidents in the city, Climaco would rush to the scene on board his motorcycle and quell the disruption. Despite the threats of violence, Climaco never carried a gun or surrounded himself with bodyguards.

Climaco maintained a highly critical view towards the Marcos government. He was critical of the highly centralized structure of government under which it was necessary to obtain the blessing of the Office of the President before funds could be disbursed. When President Marcos lifted martial law in 1981, Climaco retorted, "Marcos did not lift martial rule. He only tilted it." Climaco was outspoken regarding his anti-Marcos sentiment especially having influence within Zamboanga City. When Benigno Aquino Jr., a close personal friend of Climaco's, was assassinated in 1983, Climaco renamed one of the city's main squares as "Aquino Plaza".

==== Bid for the Batasang Pambansa ====
In 1984, Climaco successfully sought election as a Member of Parliament in the Batasang Pambansa in which he ran against former mayor and incumbent Representative Joaquin Enriquez Jr. and future mayor Maria Clara Lobregat. Climaco however declined to assume his seat until he had completed his six-year term as mayor, a stance that was seen as an act of defiance against the Marcos government.

== Assassination ==
On the morning of November 14, 1984, Climaco rushed to the scene of a fire that had broken out in a nightclub in downtown Zamboanga City. He supervised operations to put out the fire, then prepared to leave. He sighted a display of caskets at the nearby La Merced funeral homes and jokingly said, "reserve one of those for me". Climaco then mounted his motorcycle to return to his office. A man approached from behind the mayor and shot him in the nape at point-blank range. The assassin escaped, while Climaco was pronounced dead upon arrival at the hospital.

The crowd that attended Climaco's funeral in Zamboanga City was estimated as ranging from fifteen thousand people to up to two hundred thousand people. He was buried at Abong-Abong Park.

To date, nobody has been convicted for Climaco's assassination. Police and military officials pinned the blame on a Muslim group led by Rizal Alih, but attempts to apprehend him were unsuccessful. Climaco's widow publicly expressed that it was the military who was behind the murder. A relative from the Air Force was the only military person allowed into the wake. Climaco himself was said to have remarked before his death that if he were ever assassinated, the military would blame Alih for the murder.

== Legacy ==
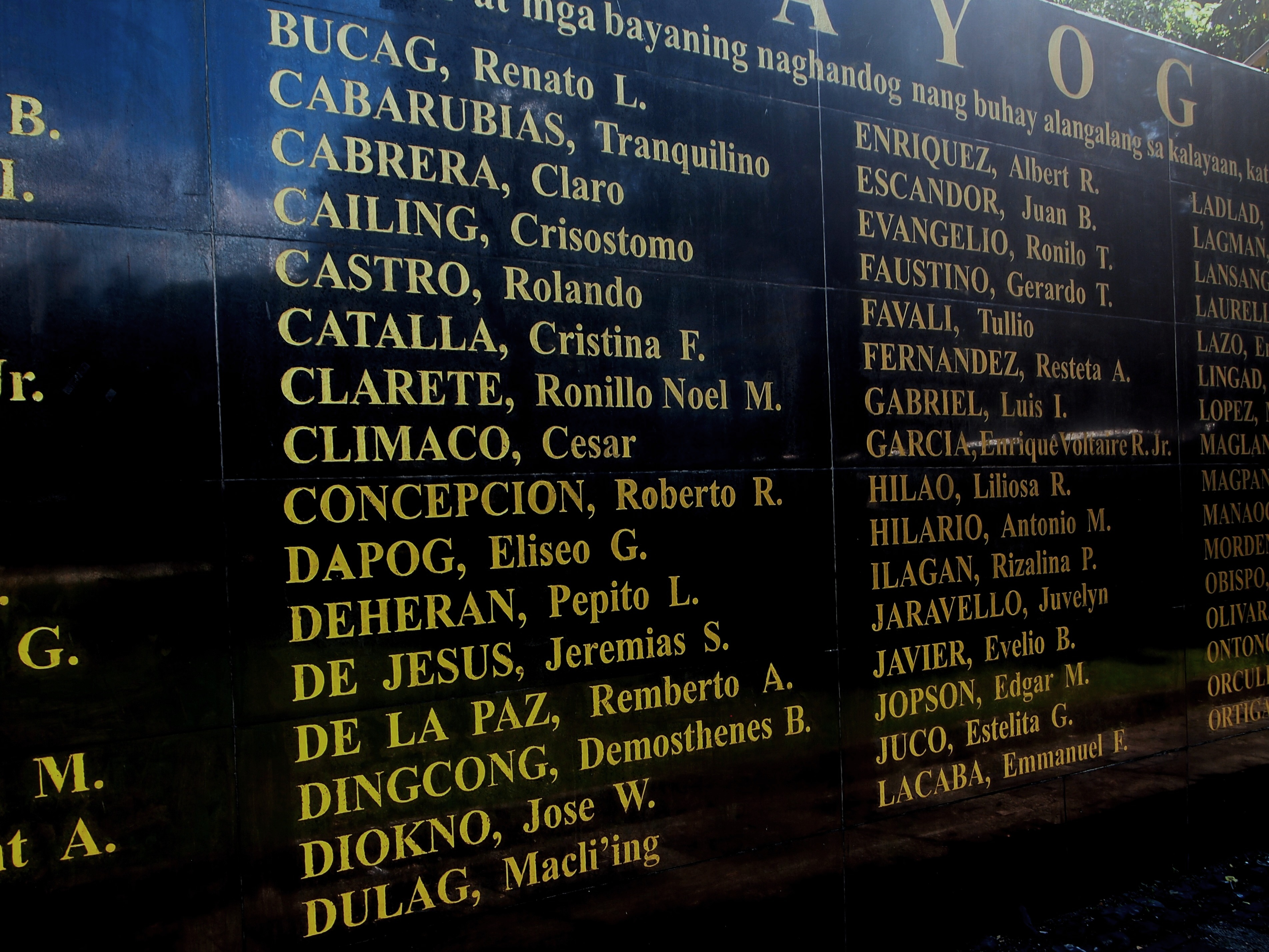
Detail of the Wall of Remembrance at the Bantayog ng mga Bayani, showing names from the first batch of Bantayog Honorees, including that of Mayor Cesar Climaco.

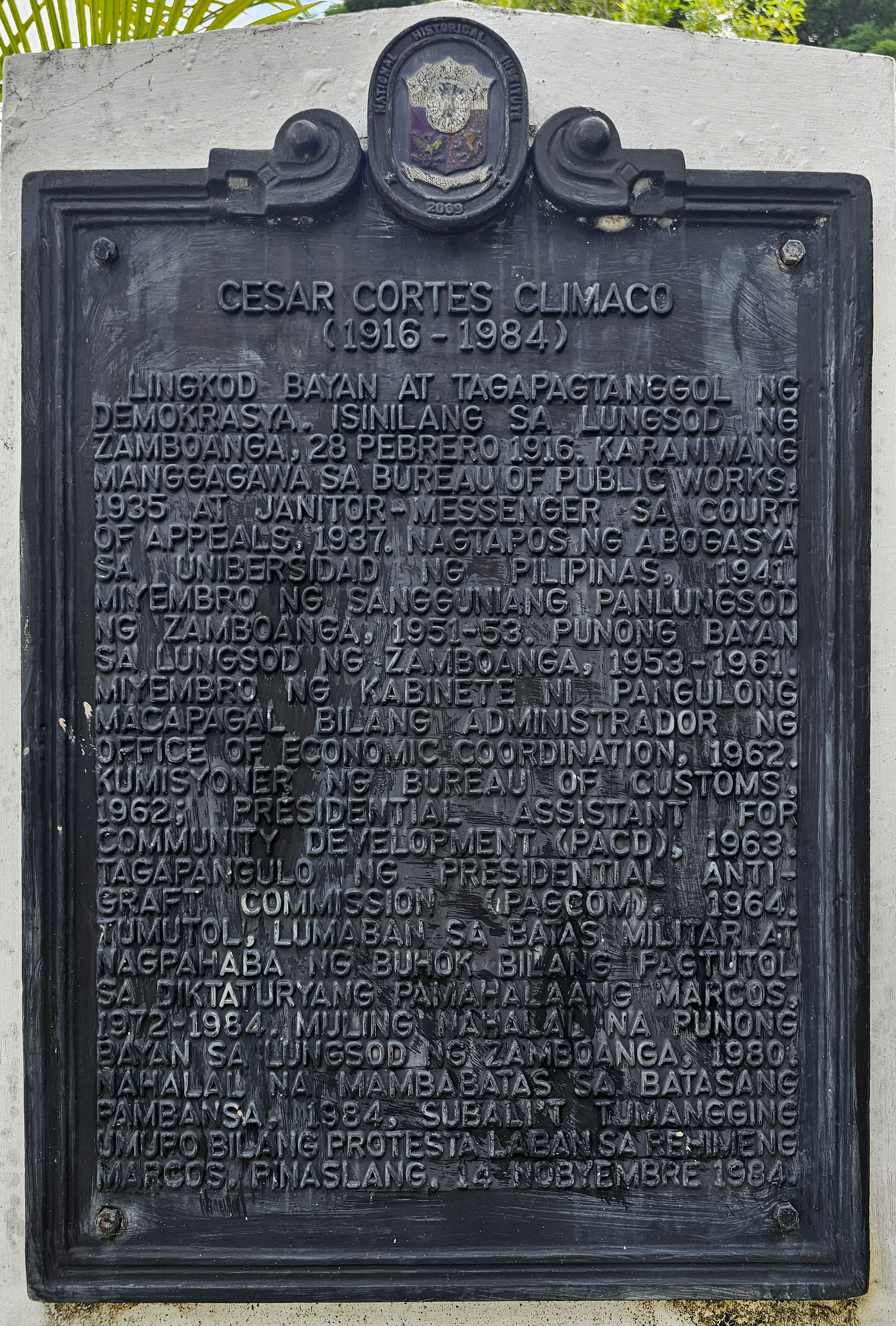
Marker installed by the National Historical Institute in 2009 in Zamboanga City

Climaco's son, Julio Cesar, was appointed OIC mayor of Zamboanga City in 1986, and served in that post until the following year. His niece, Maria Isabelle Climaco Salazar aka Beng Climaco, was elected in 2007 to the House of Representatives, representing the 1st District of Zamboanga City and served as mayor from 2013 to 2022.

In 1994, ten years after his assassination, Eddie Garcia starred in a film biography of Climaco, Mayor Cesar Climaco; produced by Seiko Films, the film was rated PG7 in an effort to show the youth the fights of one of Ninoy Aquino's greatest allies in the fight for democracy. In the film, Climaco goes to Ninoy's residence in the US and convinces him to come home to challenge Marcos for an election. Footage of his funeral is also shown during the film's closing sequence.
