= Khymer Adan Olaso =

23rd Mayor of Zamboanga City (born 1978)

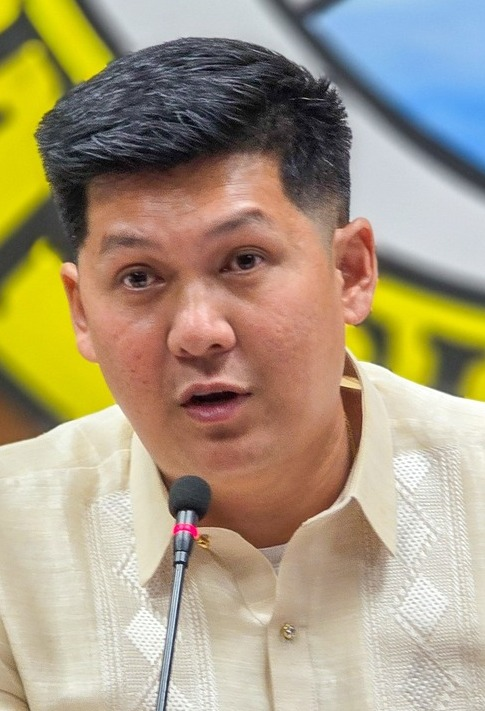
- Olaso in 2025

23rd Mayor of Zamboanga City
- Incumbent
- Assumed office June 30, 2025
- Vice Mayor: Beng Climaco
- Preceded by: John Dalipe

Member of the House of Representatives from Zamboanga City’s 1st District
- In office June 30, 2022 – June 30, 2025
- Preceded by: Cesar Jimenez Jr.
- Succeeded by: Kat Chua

Member of Zamboanga City Council from the 1st District
- In office June 30, 2019 – June 30, 2022

Personal details
- Born: Khymer Adan Taing Olaso; March 22, 1978 (age 48) Zamboanga City, Philippines
- Party: Nacionalista (2024–present); AZAP (local party; 2018–present)
- Other political affiliations: LDP (2021–2024); PDP–Laban (2018–2021); Independent (2012–2018)
- Spouse: Mary Joy Tan
- Children: 2
- Occupation: Politician

Khymer Adan Taing Olaso (born March 22, 1978) is a Filipino master mariner and politician who is currently serving as 23rd Mayor of Zamboanga City since 2025. He represented the 1st District of Zamboanga City from 2022 to 2025, he previously served as a member of the Zamboanga City Council from 2019 to 2022. Olaso is a member of the Nacionalista Party and the Adelante Zamboanga Party.

== Early life ==
Olaso was born on March 22, 1978, in Zamboanga City to a Filipino father Adan Ortega Olaso and Cambodian mother Lorraine Por Tang.

== Political career ==
=== 2013 Zamboanga City Council bid ===
In 2013, Olaso ran for councilor in Zamboanga City as independent candidate but he lost and placed 23rd.

=== Zamboanga City Council (2019–2022) ===
Olaso was elected as member of the Zamboanga City Council from 2019 to 2022.

=== House of Representatives (2022–2025) ===
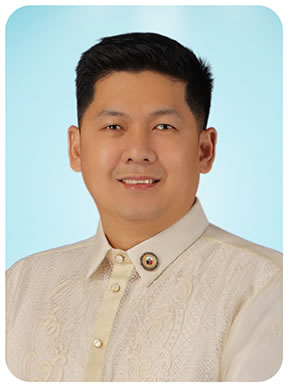
Portrait of Olaso during his term as Zamboanga City representative in the 19th Congress

In 2022, Olaso represented the first district of Zamboanga City until 2025. Olaso filed the "Death Penalty for Corruption Act" or House bill No.11211 on December 16, 2024, and released on January 22, 2025, the bill proposes that all politicians and officials from the President of the Philippines to the lowest barangay officer get executed by firing squad if convicted of corruption. However, the death penalty was abolished in the Philippines in 2006. Olaso also filed a bill to provide regulation for surrogacy in 2023.

=== Mayor of Zamboanga City (2025–present) ===
On May 12, 2025, Olaso was elected the Mayor of Zamboanga City and was proclaimed the next day, defeating Zamboanga City's 2nd district representative and the brother of incumbent mayor John Dalipe, Mannix Dalipe. He was inaugurated as Mayor on June 30, 2025 and began his term cleaning the public market. Olaso appointed former congressman Celso Lobregat as his executive secretary on July 1, 2025. Lobregat also backed Olaso's mayoral bid and his advice led to Olaso running for Mayor.

== Personal life ==
Olaso is married to Mary Joy Tan and has two sons. He has a brother Kaiser Adan Olaso, who ran as Zamboanga City's 1st district representative but he lost and placed third.

== Electoral history ==
Electoral history of Khymer Adan Olaso
Year	Office	Party		Votes received				Result
Year	Office	Local	National	Total	%	P.	Swing	Result
2013	Councilor (Zamboanga City–1st)	—N/a	Independent	4,936	—N/a	23rd	—N/a	Lost
2019	Councilor (Zamboanga City–1st)	AZAP	PDP–Laban	54,644	6.37%	3rd	—N/a	Won
2022	Representative (Zamboanga City–1st)	AZAP	LDP	73,785	49.43%	1st	—N/a	Won
2025	Mayor of Zamboanga City	AZAP	Nacionalista	169,345	47.49%	1st	—N/a	Won

Political offices
Preceded by Beng Climaco	Mayor of Zamboanga City; 2025–present	Incumbent
House of Representatives of the Philippines
Preceded by Cesar Jimenez Jr.	Representative for Zamboanga City's 1st district 2022–2025	Succeeded by Kat Chua
