= 2022 Zamboanga City local elections =

2022 Zamboanga City local election
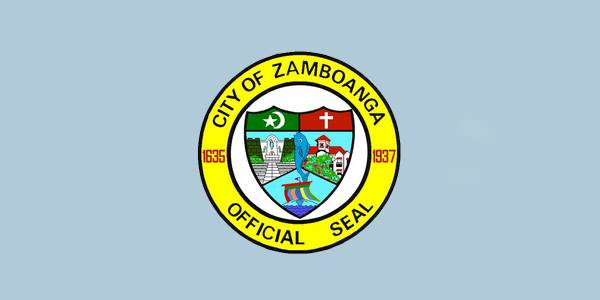
- Mayoral election
- May 9, 2022
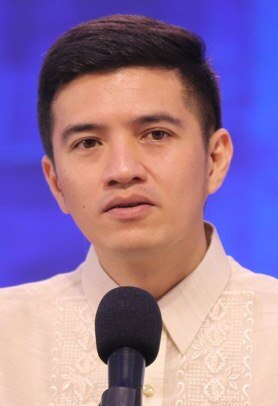

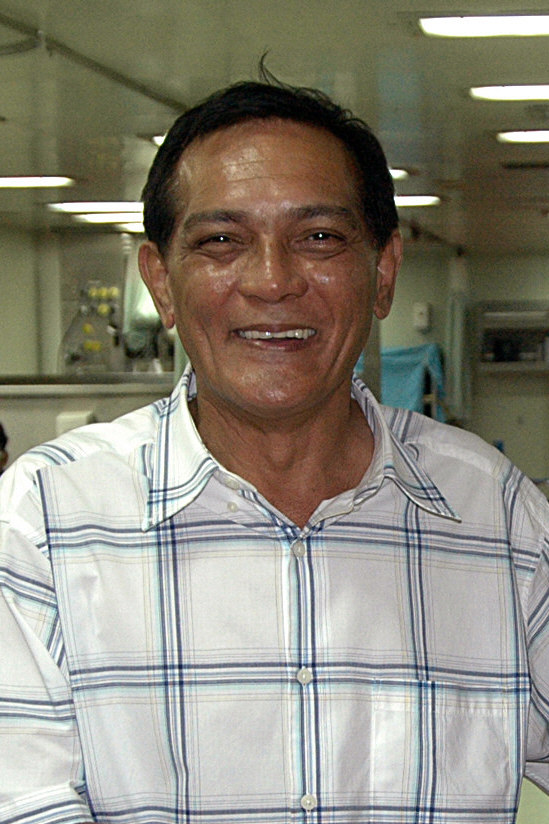
| Nominee | John Dalipe | Celso Lobregat |
| Party | PRP | LDP |
| Running mate | Melchor Rey Sadain (Lakas) | BG Guingona |
| Popular vote | 130,940 | 93,574 |
| Percentage | 40.36 | 28.84 |
Mayor before election
Maria Isabelle Climaco Salazar
Liberal
Elected mayor
John Dalipe
PRP
- Vice mayoral election
| | PAZ | LDP | Lakas |
| Nominee | Pinpin Pareja | BG Guingona | Melchor Rey Sadain |
| Party | PAZ | LDP | Lakas |
| Popular vote | 98,270 | 93,277 | 84,363 |
| Percentage | 32.19 | 30.55 | 27.63 |
Vice Mayor before election
Rommel Agan
UNA
Elected Vice Mayor
Pinpin Pareja
PAZ

Local elections were held in Zamboanga City on May 9, 2022, within the Philippine general election. The voters elected for the elective local posts in the city: the mayor, vice mayor, and eight councilors per district.

== Candidates ==
=== Team Climaco (NPC–PAZ) ===
Team Climaco (NPC–PAZ)
| Position | # | Name | Party |
|---|---|---|---|
| Mayor | 7. | Cesar Jimenez Jr. | NPC |
| Vice mayor | 4. | Josephine Pareja | PAZ |
| 1st district House representative | 3. | Beng Climaco | PAZ |
| 2nd district House representative | 3. | Juan Climaco Elago II | PAZ |
| 1st district councilor | 3. | Al Alhabashi | PAZ |
| 1st district councilor | 6. | Los Eli Angeles | PAZ |
| 1st district councilor | 7. | Benyasir Asdali | PFP |
| 1st district councilor | 21. | Gian Paolo Enriquez | PAZ |
| 1st district councilor | 22. | Selina Espiritusanto | PAZ |
| 1st district councilor | 23. | Joel Esteban | PAZ |
| 1st district councilor | 37. | El King Omaga | PRP |
| 1st district councilor | 42. | Marjorie Santa Teresa | PAZ |
| 2nd district councilor | 1. | Philip Abuy | PAZ |
| 2nd district councilor | 13. | Tiffany Joy Cabanlit | PAZ |
| 2nd district councilor | 24. | Sonyboy Jalani | PAZ |
| 2nd district councilor | 27. | Roel Macrohon | PAZ |
| 2nd district councilor | 29. | Percival Miravite | PAZ |
| 2nd district councilor | 31. | Roel Natividad | PAZ |
| 2nd district councilor | 36. | Eduardo Saavedra Jr. | PAZ |
| 2nd district councilor | 38. | James Siason | PAZ |

=== Team Colorao (LDP–AZAP) ===
Team Colorao (LDP–AZAP)
| Position | # | Name | Party |
|---|---|---|---|
| Mayor | 8. | Celso Lobregat | LDP |
| Vice mayor | 2. | Benjamin Guingona IV | LDP |
| 1st district House representative | 5. | Khymer Adan Olaso | AZAP |
| 2nd district House representative | 5. | Jerry Perez | LDP |
| 1st district councilor | 2. | Rodelin Agbulos | AZAP |
| 1st district councilor | 12. | Marxander Jaime Cabato | LDP |
| 1st district councilor | 18. | Rosslyn dela Peña | Independent |
| 1st district councilor | 30. | Abdulwakil Kasim | AZAP |
| 1st district councilor | 31. | Pilarca Ledesma | AZAP |
| 1st district councilor | 32. | Joselito Macrohon | LDP |
| 1st district councilor | 47. | Rogelio Valesco Jr. | LDP |
| 1st district councilor | 48. | Dante Vicente | LDP |
| 2nd district councilor | 5. | Shaun Alavar | LDP |
| 2nd district councilor | 11. | Frederick Atilano | LDP |
| 2nd district councilor | 16. | Vincent Paul Elago | AZAP |
| 2nd district councilor | 18. | Vicente Guingona | AZAP |
| 2nd district councilor | 28. | Richard Mariano | LDP |
| 2nd district councilor | 32. | Lilibeth Nuño | LDP |
| 2nd district councilor | 35. | Cary John Pioc | AZAP |
| 2nd district councilor | 39. | Marlon Simbajon | LDP |

=== Team Dalipe (Lakas–NUP–PRP) ===
Team Dalipe (Lakas–NUP–PRP)
| Position | # | Name | Party |
|---|---|---|---|
| Mayor | 4. | John Dalipe | PRP |
| Vice mayor | 5. | Melchor Rey Sadain | Lakas |
| 1st district House representative | 6. | Wendell Sotto | Lakas |
| 2nd district House representative | 2. | Mannix Dalipe | Lakas |
| 1st district councilor | 8. | Romeo Bagongon | Lakas |
| 1st district councilor | 10. | Hardy Bayot | NUP |
| 1st district councilor | 15. | Michel Cinco | NUP |
| 1st district councilor | 34. | Rey Modillas | PRP |
| 1st district councilor | 41. | Jerome Santos | Lakas |
| 1st district councilor | 44. | Marlon Torres | Lakas |
| 1st district councilor | 46. | Mohammad Ali Urao | Lakas |
| 1st district councilor | 49. | Nicodemus Wee | PRP |
| 2nd district councilor | 3. | Marissa Aizon | NUP |
| 2nd district councilor | 6. | Leonard Aliangan | Lakas |
| 2nd district councilor | 12. | Martin Waldo Atilano | PRP |
| 2nd district councilor | 14. | Casmir Candido | Lakas |
| 2nd district councilor | 30. | Attang Mohammad Nur | Lakas |
| 2nd district councilor | 33. | Richard Pajarito | PRP |
| 2nd district councilor | 34. | Hector Perez | NUP |
| 2nd district councilor | 37. | Joel Sanson | Lakas |

=== Team Double A (UNA) ===
Team Double A (UNA)
| Position | # | Name | Party |
|---|---|---|---|
| Mayor | 1. | Rommel Agan | UNA |
| Vice mayor | 1. | Elbert Atilano Sr. | UNA |
| 1st district councilor | 1. | Nursoud Abing | UNA |
| 1st district councilor | 13. | Santos Cagang Jr. | UNA |
| 1st district councilor | 33. | Charlie Mariano | UNA |
| 2nd district councilor | 2. | Vita Alfie Agan | UNA |
| 2nd district councilor | 15. | Al-Jihan Edding | UNA |
| 2nd district councilor | 42. | Ibno Hajar Turabin | UNA |
| 2nd district councilor | 43. | Jimmy Villaflores | UNA |

=== Partido Federal ng Pilipinas ===
Partido Federal ng Pilipinas
| Position | # | Name | Party |
|---|---|---|---|
| Mayor | 2. | Abubakar Barahama | PFP |
| 1st district House representative | 2. | Nur-Aisa Awis | PFP |
| 2nd district House representative | 4. | Fictal Majuddin | PFP |
| 1st district councilor | 5. | Hanina Alrefai | PFP |
| 1st district councilor | 14. | Aldrin Caluang | Independent |
| 1st district councilor | 35. | Jerson Monteverde | PFP |
| 2nd district councilor | 17. | Teody Gomez | PFP |
| 2nd district councilor | 20. | Sirhan Hajul | Independent |
| 2nd district councilor | 21. | Abduraquib Hussein | PFP |
| 2nd district councilor | 22. | Naima Idris | PFP |
| 2nd district councilor | 25. | Abubakar Jayari | PFP |
| 2nd district councilor | 26. | Abdulfattah Kangal | Independent |

=== PROMDI ===
PROMDI
| Position | # | Name | Party |
|---|---|---|---|
| 1st district councilor | 9. | Nelson Bautista | PROMDI |

=== Independents ===
Independent
| Position | # | Name | Party |
|---|---|---|---|
| Mayor | 3. | Cesar Climaco | Independent |
| Mayor | 5. | Ephraim Ekong | Independent |
| Mayor | 6. | Karim Ismail | Independent |
| Vice mayor | 3. | Julmunier Jubail | Independent |
| 1st district House representative | 1. | Allain Alibasa | Independent |
| 1st district House representative | 4. | Taib Nasaron | Independent |
| 2nd district House representative | 1. | Mohammad Sali Ammang | Independent |
| 1st district councilor | 4. | Proddy Alipuddin | Independent |
| 1st district councilor | 11. | Francisco Bazan | Independent |
| 1st district councilor | 16. | Walfrido Jose Climaco II | Independent |
| 1st district councilor | 17. | Carl Michael Comprendio | Independent |
| 1st district councilor | 19. | Quirico Duterte Jr. | Independent |
| 1st district councilor | 20. | Resa Mae Ecot | Independent |
| 1st district councilor | 24. | Bheeverly Estrella | Independent |
| 1st district councilor | 25. | Krizzia May Fajardo | Independent |
| 1st district councilor | 26. | Richell Gregorio | Independent |
| 1st district councilor | 27. | Munir Hadjirani | Independent |
| 1st district councilor | 28. | April Joy Iwayan | Independent |
| 1st district councilor | 36. | Erwoodjave Nura | Independent |
| 1st district councilor | 38. | Abdurajak Omar | Independent |
| 1st district councilor | 39. | Ahmad Rajam | Independent |
| 1st district councilor | 40. | Alcosbi Salido | Independent |
| 1st district councilor | 43. | Ronaldo Tan | Independent |
| 1st district councilor | 45. | Jimlani Uddin | Independent |
| 2nd district councilor | 4. | Nursahaya Akin | Independent |
| 2nd district councilor | 7. | Mary Jane Alibasa | Independent |
| 2nd district councilor | 8. | Ju-Ed Alvarez | Independent |
| 2nd district councilor | 9. | Muhammad Amin | Independent |
| 2nd district councilor | 10. | Basani Araji | Independent |
| 2nd district councilor | 19. | Muktadir Hadjirani | Independent |
| 2nd district councilor | 23. | Rosemelda Itturalde | Independent |
| 2nd district councilor | 40. | Sammy Talib | Independent |
| 2nd district councilor | 41. | Jesse Toribio | Independent |

== Results ==
=== House of Representatives ===
==== 1st District ====
Incumbent representative Cesar Jimenez Jr. is running for mayor. His seat was contested by six candidates including incumbent mayor Beng Climaco, 1st district councilor Khymer Adan Olaso and lawyer Wendell Sotto.

| Candidate | Party | Votes | % |
|---|---|---|---|
| Khymer Adan Olaso | Adelante Zamboanga Party | 73,785 | 49.43 |
| Beng Climaco | Partido Prosperidad y Amor Para na Zamboanga | 55,829 | 37.40 |
| Wendell Sotto | Lakas–CMD | 13,679 | 9.16 |
| Al Alibasa | Independent | 2,630 | 1.76 |
| Taib Nasaron | Independent | 1,896 | 1.27 |
| Sisang Awis | PFP | 1,448 | 0.97 |
| Total | | 149,267 | 100.00 |

==== 2nd District ====
Manuel Jose Dalipe is the incumbent. His main opponents are 2nd district councilor Juan Climaco Elago II and Putik barangay captain Jerry Perez.

| Candidate | Party | Votes | % |
|---|---|---|---|
| Mannix Dalipe | Lakas–CMD | 88,784 | 53.99 |
| Totong Perez | LDP | 58,461 | 35.55 |
| Kim Elago | Partido Prosperidad y Amor Para na Zamboanga | 11,304 | 6.87 |
| Mohammad Sali Ammang | Independent | 4,526 | 2.75 |
| Fictal Majuddin | Independent | 1,382 | 0.84 |
| Total | | 164,457 | 100.00 |

=== Mayor ===
Incumbent mayor Beng Climaco is term limited and will ran as 1st district representative. Her seat was contested by eight candidates, including incumbent vice mayor Rommel Agan, former mayor Celso Lobregat, 2nd district councilor John Dalipe and 1st district representative Cesar Jimenez Jr.

| Candidate | Party | Votes | % |
|---|---|---|---|
| John Dalipe | PRP | 130,940 | 40.36 |
| Celso Lobregat | LDP | 93,574 | 28.84 |
| Jawo Jimenez | NPC | 57,024 | 17.58 |
| Meng Agan | UNA | 32,187 | 9.92 |
| Cesar Climaco | Independent | 5,873 | 1.81 |
| Abubakar Barahama | PFP | 1,960 | 0.60 |
| Karim Ismail | Independent | 1,894 | 0.58 |
| Ephraim Ekong | Independent | 963 | 0.30 |
| Total | | 324,415 | 100.00 |

=== Vice Mayor ===
Incumbent vice mayor Rommel Agan is running for mayor. His seat was contested by five candidates including 1st district councilors Josephine Pareja and Elbert Atilano, 2nd district councilor Benjamin Guingona IV and former 1st district councilor Melchor Rey Sadain.

| Candidate | Party | Votes | % |
|---|---|---|---|
| Pinpin Pareja | Partido Prosperidad y Amor Para na Zamboanga | 98,270 | 32.19 |
| BG Guingona | LDP | 93,277 | 30.55 |
| Mel Sadain | Lakas–CMD | 84,363 | 27.63 |
| Bong Atilano | UNA | 26,432 | 8.66 |
| Jul Julmunier | Independent | 2,983 | 0.98 |
| Total | | 305,325 | 100.00 |

=== City Council ===
| Party | Votes | % | Seats |
|---|---|---|---|
| Laban ng Demokratikong Pilipino | 422,991 | 21.03 | 6 |
| Partido Prosperidad y Amor Para na Zamboanga | 372,267 | 18.51 | 3 |
| Lakas–CMD | 237,537 | 11.81 | 1 |
| Adelante Zamboanga Party | 235,561 | 11.71 | 2 |
| United Nationalist Alliance | 207,227 | 10.30 | 3 |
| People's Reform Party | 149,864 | 7.45 | 1 |
| National Unity Party | 110,263 | 5.48 | 0 |
| Partido Federal ng Pilipinas | 55,089 | 2.74 | 0 |
| PROMDI | 6,766 | 0.34 | 0 |
| Independent | 213,582 | 10.62 | 0 |
| Total | 2,011,147 | 100.00 | 16 |

==== 1st District ====
| Candidate | Party | Votes | % |
|---|---|---|---|
| Lit-lit Macrohon | LDP | 67,505 | 6.89 |
| King Omaga | PRP | 62,154 | 6.35 |
| Joey Santos | Lakas–CMD | 51,096 | 5.22 |
| Boday Cabato | LDP | 48,001 | 4.90 |
| Dan Vicente | LDP | 47,627 | 4.86 |
| Charlie Mariano | UNA | 44,727 | 4.57 |
| Gerky Valesco | LDP | 43,464 | 4.44 |
| Joel Esteban | Partido Prosperidad y Amor Para na Zamboanga | 36,929 | 3.77 |
| Al Urao | Lakas–CMD | 33,942 | 3.47 |
| Gian Enriquez | Partido Prosperidad y Amor Para na Zamboanga | 31,820 | 3.25 |
| Rodel Agbulos | Adelante Zamboanga Party | 31,186 | 3.18 |
| Mike Cinco | NUP | 29,348 | 3.00 |
| Pilarica Ledesma | Adelante Zamboanga Party | 28,171 | 2.88 |
| Marlon Torres | Lakas–CMD | 27,734 | 2.83 |
| Los Angeles | Partido Prosperidad y Amor Para na Zamboanga | 27,704 | 2.83 |
| Hardy Bayot | NUP | 27,551 | 2.81 |
| Selina Espiritusanto | Partido Prosperidad y Amor Para na Zamboanga | 23,633 | 2.41 |
| Abdulwakil Kasim | Adelante Zamboanga Party | 22,524 | 2.30 |
| Lyn dela Peña | Independent | 22,338 | 2.28 |
| Al Alhabshi | Partido Prosperidad y Amor Para na Zamboanga | 22,100 | 2.26 |
| Quirico Duterte Jr. | Independent | 21,724 | 2.22 |
| Romy Bagongon | Lakas–CMD | 19,865 | 2.03 |
| Rey Modillas | PRP | 18,983 | 1.94 |
| Pepi Climaco | Independent | 18,914 | 1.93 |
| Marj Santa Teresa | Partido Prosperidad y Amor Para na Zamboanga | 17,772 | 1.81 |
| Nico Wee | PRP | 15,814 | 1.61 |
| Bendigong Asdali | PFP | 13,716 | 1.40 |
| Hanina Alrefai | PFP | 12,719 | 1.30 |
| Nursoud Abing | UNA | 11,475 | 1.17 |
| Nurmina Jalani | Independent | 10,824 | 1.11 |
| Nel Hadjirani | Independent | 10,242 | 1.05 |
| Prody Alipuddin | Independent | 7,821 | 0.80 |
| Jerson Monteverde | PFP | 7,817 | 0.80 |
| Sai Cagang | UNA | 7,566 | 0.77 |
| Nelson Bautista | PROMDI | 6,766 | 0.69 |
| Jim Uddin | Independent | 6,092 | 0.62 |
| Jack Omar | Independent | 5,893 | 0.60 |
| Aldz Caluang | Independent | 4,757 | 0.49 |
| Bheeverly Estrella | Independent | 4,072 | 0.42 |
| Kiko Bazan | Independent | 3,924 | 0.40 |
| Rolando Tan | Independent | 3,609 | 0.37 |
| Krizzia May Fajardo | Independent | 3,436 | 0.35 |
| Ritchell Gregorio | Independent | 3,277 | 0.33 |
| Jams Rajam | Independent | 2,713 | 0.28 |
| April Joy Iwayan | Independent | 2,442 | 0.25 |
| Alcos Salido | Independent | 2,236 | 0.23 |
| Carl Comprendio | Independent | 2,159 | 0.22 |
| Resa Mae Ecot | Independent | 1,814 | 0.19 |
| Erwoodjave Nura | Independent | 1,518 | 0.15 |
| Total | | 979,514 | 100.00 |

==== 2nd District ====
| Candidate | Party | Votes | % |
|---|---|---|---|
| Vino Guingona | Adelante Zamboanga Party | 73,929 | 7.17 |
| James Siason | Partido Prosperidad y Amor Para na Zamboanga | 61,953 | 6.01 |
| Lilibeth Nuño | LDP | 60,534 | 5.87 |
| VP Elago | Adelante Zamboanga Party | 54,796 | 5.31 |
| Jimmy Villaflores | UNA | 52,391 | 5.08 |
| Fred Atilano | LDP | 52,224 | 5.06 |
| Jihan Edding | UNA | 44,318 | 4.30 |
| Eddie Saavedra | Partido Prosperidad y Amor Para na Zamboanga | 39,218 | 3.80 |
| Hecky Perez | NUP | 38,594 | 3.74 |
| Bong Simbajon | LDP | 37,487 | 3.63 |
| Elong Natividad | Partido Prosperidad y Amor Para na Zamboanga | 36,276 | 3.52 |
| Richard Mariano | LDP | 33,641 | 3.26 |
| Vita Agan | UNA | 33,490 | 3.25 |
| Shaun Alavar | LDP | 32,508 | 3.15 |
| Attang Mohammad Nur | Lakas–CMD | 30,097 | 2.92 |
| Tutu Candido | Lakas–CMD | 28,973 | 2.81 |
| Walmart Atilano | PRP | 28,929 | 2.80 |
| Cary Pioc | Adelante Zamboanga Party | 24,995 | 2.42 |
| Richard Pajarito | PRP | 23,984 | 2.32 |
| Joel Sanson | Lakas–CMD | 23,948 | 2.32 |
| Banjung Aliangan | Lakas–CMD | 21,882 | 2.12 |
| Jung Jung Macrohon | Partido Prosperidad y Amor Para na Zamboanga | 18,613 | 1.80 |
| Sonyboy Jalani | Partido Prosperidad y Amor Para na Zamboanga | 18,403 | 1.78 |
| Rose Iturralde | Independent | 18,290 | 1.77 |
| Marissa Aizon | NUP | 14,770 | 1.43 |
| Percival Miravite | Partido Prosperidad y Amor Para na Zamboanga | 14,032 | 1.36 |
| Ibno Turabin | UNA | 13,260 | 1.29 |
| Muhammad Amil | Independent | 12,376 | 1.20 |
| Philip Abuy | Partido Prosperidad y Amor Para na Zamboanga | 12,088 | 1.17 |
| Tiffany Joy Cabanlit | Partido Prosperidad y Amor Para na Zamboanga | 11,686 | 1.13 |
| Abubakar Jayari | PFP | 7,329 | 0.71 |
| Ed Alvarez | Independent | 6,743 | 0.65 |
| Mhur Hadjirani | Independent | 6,443 | 0.62 |
| Sonny Boy Hussein | PFP | 6,146 | 0.60 |
| Sirhan Hajul | Independent | 5,896 | 0.57 |
| Otoh Araji | Independent | 5,385 | 0.52 |
| Sammy Talib | Independent | 4,828 | 0.47 |
| Jesse Toribio | Independent | 4,603 | 0.45 |
| Teody Gomez | PFP | 4,475 | 0.43 |
| Abdulfattah Kangal | Independent | 4,015 | 0.39 |
| Jane Alibasa | Independent | 3,099 | 0.30 |
| Naimz Idris | PFP | 2,887 | 0.28 |
| Nursahaya Akin | Independent | 2,099 | 0.20 |
| Total | | 1,031,633 | 100.00 |
