= Zamboanga City Council =

Local government in the Philippines

Zamboanga City Council Consejo de la Ciudad de Zamboanga

Type
- Type: Unicameral
- Term limits: 3 terms (9 years)

Leadership
- Presiding Officer: Ma. Isabelle G. Climaco, AZAP

Structure
- Seats: 19 councilors (including 2 ex officio members and 1 reserved seat); 1 ex officio presiding officer
- Political groups: Majority bloc (12): Liberal (6); UNA (3); Nonpartisan (3); Minority bloc (7): LDP (7)
- Length of term: 3 years
- Authority: Zamboanga City 1937 Charter; Local Government Code of the Philippines

Elections
- Voting system: Plurality-at-large voting (16 seats); Indirect election (2 seats); Acclamation (1 seat)
- Last election: May 9, 2022
- Next election: 2025

Meeting place
- Zamboanga Sangguniang Panglungsod Building

Website
- Official website of the City Council of Zamboanga

The Zamboanga City Council (Chavacano: Consejo de la Ciudad de Zamboanga) is Zamboanga City's Sangguniang Panlungsod or local legislature.

Currently composed of 19 members, with 16 councilors elected from Zamboanga City's two legislative districts and three (3) ex-officio members composed of the: (1) President of the Liga ng mga Barangay ng Lungsod ng Zamboanga (English: League of Barangays of the City of Zamboanga); (2) the President of the Pederasyon ng Sangguniang Kabataan (English: Federation of Youth Councils); and (3) the Mandatory Representative of the indigenous peoples in Zamboanga City.

The presiding officer of the council is the Vice-Mayor, who is elected citywide.

The council is responsible for creating laws and ordinances under Zamboanga City's jurisdiction. The mayor can veto proposed bills, but the council can override it with a two-thirds supermajority.

== Evolution ==
The first legislative body of Zamboanga was established in 1914 composed of councilors who represented the different districts of barrios of then-municipality of Zamboanga. When the City Charter of Zamboanga was signed on October 12, 1936, the municipal council was replaced by the City Council presided by the mayor and consisted of five councilors, the city treasurer and the city engineer. All members are appointed by the President of the Philippine Commonwealth.

With the passage of Republic Act No. 1210 on April 29, 1955, the position of mayor became elective and the post of vice-mayor was created. The Council also became elective and its membership was increased to eight presided by the vice-mayor.

During the Marcos regime, the city council was renamed to Sangguniang Panglungsod and its membership shuffled. The mayor became the presiding-officer while the vice-mayor became a regular member. Other representatives such as the agriculture, business and labor sectoral representatives; chairman of the Kabataan Barangay Federation and the president of the Association of Barangay Captains was added to the council. All members of the council except for the mayor and the vice-mayor are all appointed by the President.

After Marcos was deposed, a new Local Government Code was enacted in 1991 and the mayor was restored to the executive branch. The city council organization existed since.

The composition of the Council changed when the representation of the youth was left unfilled during the 2013 Sangguniang Kabataan elections by virtue of Republic Act No. 10362, postponing the SK elections from 2013 to 2015 to pave way for reforms in the considered corrupt agency in the government. In 2013, the youth sector in the city has no representative to the Council effectively decreasing its membership from 18 to 17. The youth representation will be filled again in the upcoming 2016 elections.

On 2014, the membership of the Council increased again by 1 as an assembly of the indigenous peoples in the city chose a representative to represent their interests in the Council.

On 2018, the SK representation has been filled as the Philippines has conducted Barangay and SK elections since its second postponement in 2017.

== Manner of election ==
Each of Zamboanga City's two legislative districts elects eight councilors to the council. In plurality-at-large voting, a voter may vote up to eight candidates, with the candidates having the eight highest number of votes being elected.

In addition, the Barangay chairmen and the SK chairmen throughout the city elect amongst themselves their representatives to the council. The representative of the indigenous peoples (IPs) in the city is elected by bonafide members of the IP Council of Elders who will serve with the same functions of a city councilor. Hence, there are 19 councilors.

City council elections are synchronized with other elections in the country. Elections are held every first Monday of May every third year since 1992.

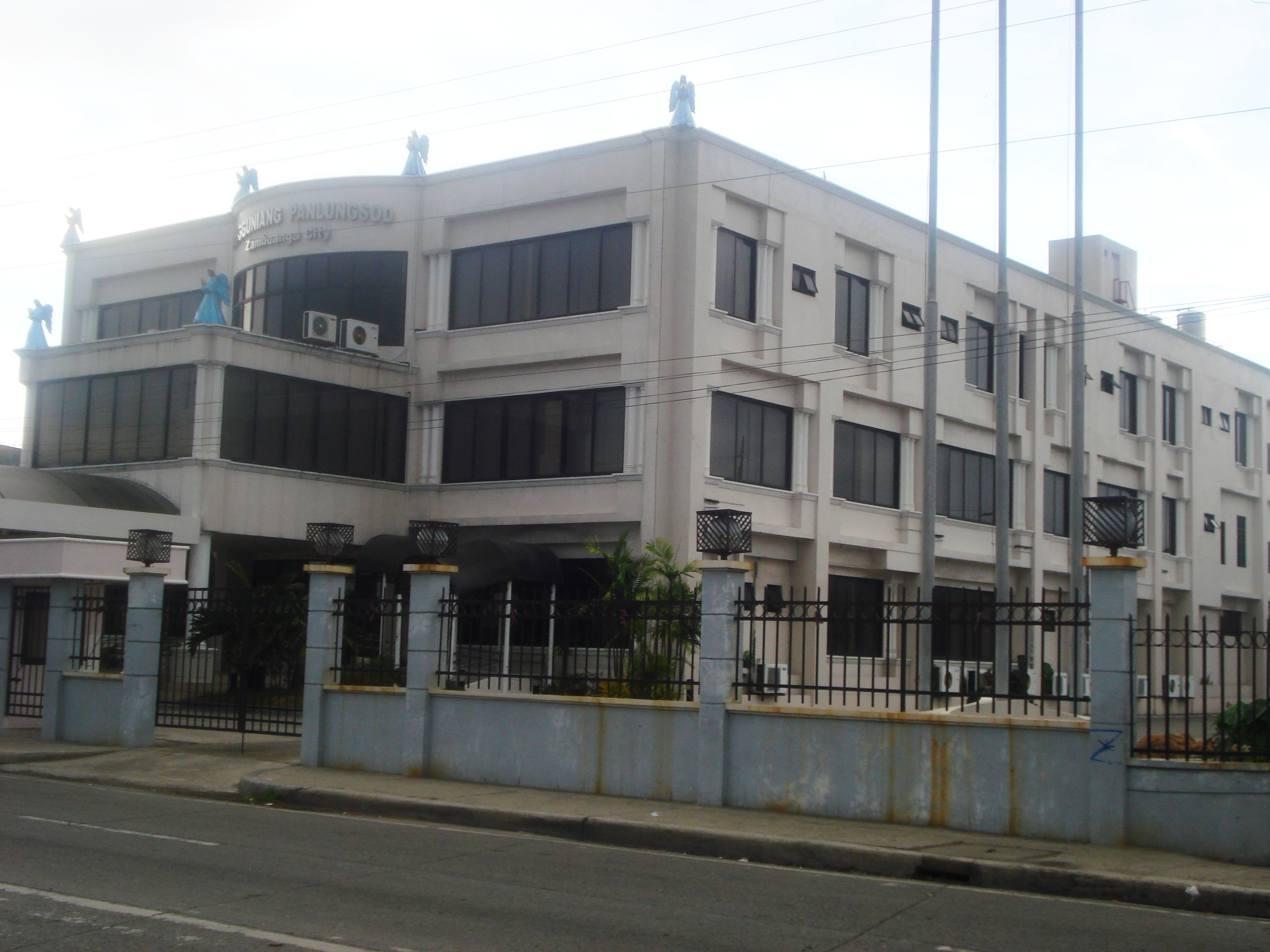
Sangguniang Panglungsod Building, the seat of the legislative power of the Zamboanga City Government, located along Roseller T. Lim Boulevard.

== Membership ==
As the presiding officer, the vice-mayor can only vote to break ties.

The list below comprises the members of the council:

=== Current Membership of the Council (2019–2022) ===
Councilor	Party	District	Terms			Bloc	Barangay of Registration
Councilor	Party	District	Number	Starts	Ends	Bloc	Barangay of Registration
Perez, Jerry E.	Nonpartisan	LNB^{1}	2	June 30, 2013		Majority	Guiwan
Pioc, Cary John	Nonpartisan	SK^{2}	1	May 25, 2018		Minority	Mercedes
Hanapi, Tungkuh	Nonpartisan	IP^{3}	1	2016		Majority	Kasanyangan
Alavar, Miguel III	LDP	2nd	3	2011	June 30, 2022	Minority	
Atilano, Elbert Sr.	Liberal	1st	2	June 30, 2016	June 30, 2022	Majority	
Dalipe, John	Lakas-CMD	2nd	1	June 30, 2019	June 30, 2022	Majority	Tetuan
dela Cruz, Crisanto	PFP	1st	1	June 30, 2019	June 30, 2022	Majority	
Edding, Al-Jihan	UNA	2nd	2	June 30, 2016	June 30, 2022	Majority	
Elago, Juan Climaco II	UNA	2nd	3	June 30, 2013	June 30, 2022	Majority	
Elago, Vincent Paul	PDP-Laban	2nd	1	June 30, 2019	June 30, 2022	Minority	
Guingona, Benjamin IV	PDP-Laban	2nd	3	June 30, 2013	June 30, 2022	Minority	Sta. Catalina
Jimenez, Cesar Sr.	PAZ	1st	2	June 30, 2016	June 30, 2022	Majority	Ayala
Macrohon, Joselito	LDP	1st	1	March 18, 2018^{4}	June 30, 2022	Minority	San Roque
Nuño, Lilibeth	PDP-Laban	2nd	2	June 30, 2016	June 30, 2022	Minority	Taluksangay
Olaso, Khymer Adan	AZAP	1st	1	June 30, 2019	June 30, 2022	Minority	
Omaga, King	PAZ	1st	1	June 30, 2019	June 30, 2022	Majority	
Pareja, Josephine	Liberal	1st	3	June 30, 2013	June 30, 2022	Majority	Talisayan
Valesco, Rogelio Jr.	LDP	1st	1	February 21, 2019^{5}	June 30, 2022	Minority	
Villaflores, Jimmy	Liberal	2nd	2	June 30, 2016	June 30, 2022	Majority	Sta. Catalina

Notes
^{1} The President of the Liga ng mga Barangay in Zamboanga City is an ex-officio member of the Sangguniang Panglungsod.
^{2} The President of the Pedersayon ng mga Sangguniang Kabataan in Zamboanga City is an ex-officio member of the Sangguniang Panglungsod.
^{3} The Mandatory Representative of the Indigenous Peoples in Zamboanga City is an ex-officio member of the Sangguniang Panglungsod.
^{4} Former San Roque Barangay chairman Joselito Macrohon was appointed by President Rodrigo Duterte to fill in the vacancy of Councilor Mariano. Macrohon run for councilor last 2016 but lost.
^{5} Former councilor Rogelio Valesco, Jr. was appointed by President Duterte to fill in the remaining months of Valderrosa-Abubakar's term.

Summary by party
Party	Total	%
PDP–Laban	3	15.7%
LDP	3	15.7%
Liberal	3	15.7%
UNA	2	10.5%
PAZ	2	10.5%
PFP	1	5.3%
Lakas	1	5.3%
AZAP	1	5.3%
Nonpartisan	3	15.7%
Total	19	100%

Summary
PO								
District	1	2	3	4	5	6	7	8
1st								
2nd								
Ex officio								

=== Membership of the Council (2016–2019) ===
Councilor	Party	District	Terms			Bloc	Barangay of Registration
Councilor	Party	District	Number	Starts	Ends	Bloc	Barangay of Registration
Perez, Jerry E.	Nonpartisan	LNB ^{1}	~	June 30, 2013		Majority	Guiwan
Pioc, Cary John	Nonpartisan	SK ^{2}	~	May 25, 2018		Minority	Mercedes
Hanapi, Tungkuh	Nonpartisan	IP ^{3}	~	2016		Majority	Kasanyangan
Valderrosa-Abubakar, Myra Paz	LDP	1st	3	June 30, 2010	July 30, 2018^{6}	Minority	
Agan, Rommel	UNA	2nd	3	June 30, 2010	June 30, 2019	Majority	
Alavar, Miguel III	LDP	2nd	2	2011	June 30, 2019	Minority	
Arquiza, Teodyver	Liberal	2nd	1	June 30, 2016	June 30, 2019	Majority	Talon-Talon
Atilano, Elbert Sr.	Liberal	1st	1	June 30, 2016	June 30, 2019	Majority	
Bayot, Rodolfo	Liberal	1st	3	June 30, 2010	June 30, 2019	Majority	Tumaga
Cabato, Marxander Jaime	LDP	1st	1	June 30, 2016	June 30, 2019	Minority	
Edding, Al-Jihan	UNA	2nd	1	June 30, 2016	June 30, 2019	Majority	
Elago, Juan Climaco II	UNA	2nd	2	June 30, 2013	June 30, 2019	Majority	
Guingona, Benjamin IV	LDP	2nd	2	June 30, 2013	June 30, 2019	Minority	Sta. Catalina
Jimenez, Cesar Sr.	Liberal	1st	1	June 30, 2016	June 30, 2019	Majority	Ayala
Lim, Rodolfo	LDP	1st	1	June 30, 2016	June 30, 2019	Minority	
Macrohon, Joselito	LDP	1st	~	March 18, 2018^{5}	June 30, 2019	Minority	San Roque
Mariano, Charlie	LDP	1st	2	June 30, 2013	November 29, 2017^{4}	Minority	
Nuño, Lilibeth	LDP	2nd	1	June 30, 2016	June 30, 2019	Minority	Taluksangay
Pareja, Josephine	Liberal	1st	2	June 30, 2013	June 30, 2019	Majority	Talisayan
Valesco, Rogelio Jr.	LDP	1st	~	February 21, 2019^{7}	June 30, 2019	Minority	
Villaflores, Jaime	Liberal	2nd	1	June 30, 2016	June 30, 2019	Majority	Sta. Catalina

Notes
^{1} The President of the Liga ng mga Barangay in Zamboanga City is an ex-officio member of the Sangguniang Panglungsod.
^{2} The President of the Pedersayon ng mga Sangguniang Kabataan in Zamboanga City is an ex-officio member of the Sangguniang Panglungsod.
^{3} The Mandatory Representative of the Indigenous Peoples in Zamboanga City is an ex-officio member of the Sangguniang Panglungsod.
^{4} Councilor Mariano was disqualified by COMELEC as he was found guilty by the Supreme Court for violation of Batas Pambansa Blg. 22 or the Bouncing Cheque Law prior to the 2016 elections making his seat vacant.
^{5} Former San Roque Barangay chairman Joselito Macrohon was appointed by President Rodrigo Duterte to fill in the vacancy of Councilor Mariano. Macrohon run for councilor last 2016 but lost.
^{6} Myra Paz Valderrosa-Abubakar was appointed by President Rodrigo Duterte to be regional director of Region IX Department of Tourism on July 30, 2018, vacating her seat.
^{7} Former councilor Rogelio Valesco, Jr. was appointed by President Duterte to fill in the remaining months of Valderrosa-Abubakar's term.

Summary
Party	Total	%
LDP	7	36.8%
Liberal	6	31.6%
UNA	3	15.7%
Nonpartisan	3	15.7%
Total	19	100%

Summary
PO								
District	1	2	3	4	5	6	7	8
1st								
2nd								
Ex officio								

=== Membership of the Council (2013–2016) ===
Councilor	Party	District	Current Term started	# of Terms
Jerry E. Perez	Nonpartisan	LNB	2013	1
vacant	Nonpartisan	SK		
vacant	Nonpartisan	IP		
Myra Paz Valderrosa-Abubakar	LDP	1st	2010	2
Rommel Agan	UNA	2nd	2010	2
Miguel Alavar III	LDP	2nd	2011	1
Rodolfo Bayot	UNA	1st	2010	2
Luis Biel III	LDP	1st	2007	3
Juan Climaco Elago II	UNA	2nd	2013	1
Vincent Paul Elago	AZAP	2nd	2010	2
Benjamin Guingona IV	LDP	2nd	2013	1
Cesar Jimenez, Jr.	NPC	1st	2007	3
Charlie Mariano	LDP	1st	2013	1
Roel Natividad	Liberal	2nd	2013	1
Josephine Pareja	Independent	1st	2013	1
Percival Ramos	LDP	2nd	2010	2
Eduardo Saavedra Jr.	LDP	2nd	2007	3
Melchor Sadain	Independent	1st	2007	3
Rogelio Valesco, Jr.	LDP	1st	2007	3

Summary
Party	Total	%
LDP	8	42.1%
UNA	3	15.7%
Liberal	1	5.3%
NPC	1	5.3%
AZAP	1	5.3%
Independent	2	10.5%
Nonpartisan	3	15.7%
Total	19	100%

Summary
PO								
District	1	2	3	4	5	6	7	8
1st								
2nd								
Ex officio								

== Powers, duties and functions ==
The Sangguniang Panlungsod, as the legislative body of the city, is mandated by the Local Government Code of 1991 to[1]:

- Enact ordinances;
- Approve resolutions;
- Appropriate funds for the general welfare of the city and its inhabitants; and
- Ensure the proper exercise of the corporate powers of the city as provided for under Section 22 of the Local Government Code.

Furthermore, the following duties and functions are relegated to the Sangguniang Panlungsod:

- Approve ordinances and pass resolutions necessary for an efficient and effective city government;
- Generate and maximize the use of resources and revenues for the development plans, program objectives and priorities of the city as provided for under section 18 of the Local Government Code of 1991, with particular attention to agro-industrial development and citywide growth and progress;
- Enact ordinances granting franchises and authorizing the issuance of permits or licenses, upon such conditions and for such purposes intended to promote the general welfare of the inhabitants of the city but subject to the provisions of Book II of the Local Government Code of 1991;
- Regulate activities relative to the use of land, buildings, and structures within the city in order to promote the general welfare of its inhabitants;
- Approve ordinances which shall ensure the efficient and effective delivery of the basic services and facilities as provided for under Section 17 of the Local Government Code; and
- Exercise such other powers and perform such other duties and functions as may be prescribed by law or ordinance.

== Standing committees ==
=== 2016–2019 ===
There are 32 standing committees in the city council each headed by a city councilor.

Committee	Chairperson	Vice-Chairperson
Agriculture and Agrarian Relations	Al-Jihan Edding	Juan Climaco Elago II
Anti-Drugs	Jerry E. Perez	Teodyver A. Arquiza
Appointments	Elbert Atilano	Jaime Villaflores
Appropriations	Rommel Agan	Jaime Villaflores
Awards	Teodyver Arquiza	Al-Jihan Edding
Cooperatives	Al-Jihan Edding	Juan Climaco Elago II
Disaster and Relief Services	Teodyver Arquiza	Marxander Jaime Cabato
Education	Rodolfo Bayot	Elbert Atilano
Elderly and Disadvantaged Groups	Cesar Jimenez, Sr.	Lilibeth M. Nuño
Energy and Public Utilities	Elbert Atilano	
Ethics, Rules and Privilege	Jaime Villaflores	Rommel Agan
Franchise	Rommel Agan	Jaime Villaflores
Games and Amusement	Marxander Jaime Cabato	Jaime Villaflores
Good Government	Cesar Jimenez, Sr.	Rommel Agan
Health and Sanitation	Lilibeth M. Nuño	Jaime Villaflores
Human Rights	Rommel Agan	Jaime Villaflores
Labor and Industrial Relations	Josephine Pareja	Rommel Agan
Markets and Slaugtherhouse	Rodolfo Bayot	Al-Jihan Edding
Muslim and Cultural Affairs	Tungkuh Hanapi	Lilibeth M. Nuño
Natural Resources and Environment Protection	Cesar Jimenez, Sr.	Josephine Pareja
Ordinances and Resolutions	Cesar Jimenez, Sr.	Juan Climaco Elago II
Peace and Order	Josephine Pareja	Cesar Jimenez, Sr.
Public Works	Jaime Villaflores	Rommel Agan
Rural Affairs (Barangay Affairs)	Jerry E. Perez	Jaime Villaflores
Science and Technology	Juan Climaco Elago II	Rodolfo Bayot
Social Works and Welfare	Tungkuh Hanapi	Jaime Villaflores
Tourism, Arts, Culture and Foreign Relations	Benjamin Guingona IV	Elbert Atilano
Trade, Investment and Industry	Rommel Agan	Juan Climaco Elago II
Urban Poor and People's Organization and NGO	Josephine Pareja	Cesar Jimenez, Sr.
Ways and Means	Rommel Agan	Al-Jihan Edding
Women, Children and Family Welfare	Myra Paz Abubakar	Al-Jihan Edding
Youth and Sports Development	Elbert Atilano	Benjamin Guingona IV

=== 2013–2016 ===
There are 32 standing committees in the city council each headed by a city councilor.

Committee	Chairperson	Vice-Chairperson
Agriculture and Agrarian Relations	Miguel Alavar III	Luis Biel III
Anti-Drugs	Jerry E. Perez	Roel Natividad
Appointments	Juan Climaco Elago II	Roel Natividad
Appropriations	Rogelio Valesco, Jr.	Benjamin Guingona IV
Awards	Miguel Alavar III	Luis Biel III
Cooperatives	Myra Paz Abubakar	Percival Ramos
Disaster and Relief Services	Cesar Jimenez, Jr.	Benjamin Guingona IV
Education	Rogelio Valesco, Jr.	Rodolfo Bayot
Elderly and Disadvantaged Groups	Luis Biel III	
Energy and Public Utilities	Charlie Mariano	Roel Natividad
Ethics, Rules and Privilege	Luis Biel III	Charlie Mariano
Franchise	Luis Biel III	Roel Natividad
Games and Amusement	Josephine Pareja	Vincent Paul Elago
Good Government	Melchor Sadain	Charlie Mariano
Health and Sanitation	Vincent Paul Elago	Myra Paz Abubakar
Human Rights	Rommel Agan	Roel Natividad
Labor and Industrial Relations	Miguel Alavar III	Benjamin Guingona IV
Markets and Slaugtherhouse	Eduardo Saavedra, Jr.	Percival Ramos
Muslim and Cultural Affairs		Myra Paz Abubakar
Natural Resources and Environment Protection		Charlie Mariano
Ordinances and Resolutions	Charlie Mariano	Miguel Alavar III
Peace and Order	Jerry E. Perez	
Public Works	Eduardo Saavedra, Jr.	Jerry E. Perez
Rural Affairs	Jerry E. Perez	Percival Ramos
Science and Technology	Vincent Paul Elago	Myra Paz Abubakar
Tourism, Arts, Culture and Foreign Relations	Vincent Paul Elago	Rogelio Valesco, Jr.
Trade, Investment and Industry	Benjamin Guingona IV	Miguel Alavar III
Urban Planning and Land Use	Percival Ramos	Jerry E. Perez
Urban Poor and People's Organization and NGO	Percival Ramos	Rodolfo Bayot
Ways and Means	Benjamin Guingona IV	Charlie Mariano
Women, Children and Family Welfare	Myra Paz Abubakar	Rogelio Valesco, Jr.
Youth and Sports Development		Roel Natividad
