= 2004 Zamboanga City local elections =

Philippine election

2004 Zamboanga City mayoralty election
- May 10, 2004
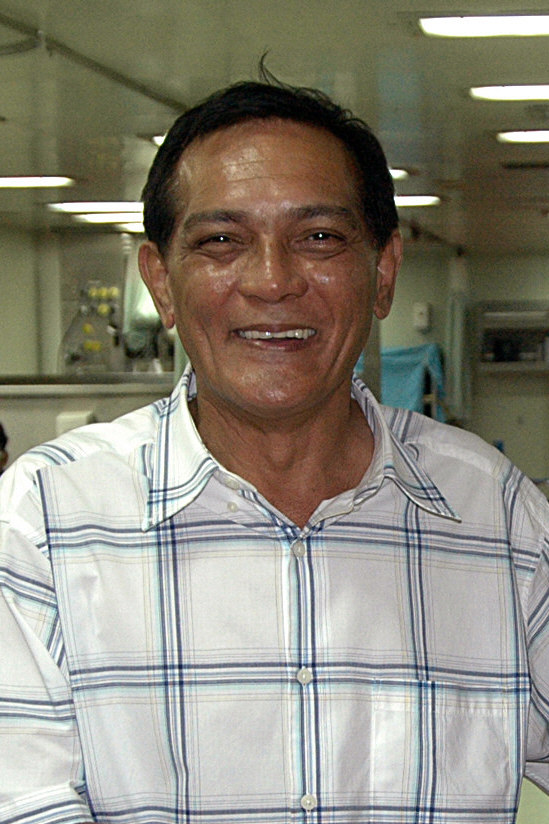
Nominee	Celso Lobregat	Lepeng Wee	Charlie Mariano
Party	LDP	Independent	Independent
Running mate	Maria Isabelle Climaco	Jaime Cabato
Popular vote	113,447	70,398	49,669
Percentage	48.34	29.99	21.16
Mayor before election
Erbie Fabian
LDP
Elected mayor
Celso Lobregat
LDP

Local elections were held in Zamboanga City on May 10, 2004, within the Philippine general election. The voters elected for the elective local posts in the city: the mayor, vice mayor, 12 councilors and one representative from its lone district.

== Mayoral and vice mayoral elections ==
Mayor Maria Clara Lobregat died of complications in January 2, 2004, paving the mayoralty race for the ruling Laban ng Demokratikong Pilipino wide open since she was the presumptive nominee running for a third term. Vice Mayor Erbie Fabian took her place as acting mayor.

Lobregat's son, incumbent Congressman Celso Lobregat became the standard-bearer of the LDP, and incumbent Mayor Fabian will run for the post left by Celso. Celso picked Councilor Beng Climaco as his running-mate.

== Results ==
The candidate for district representative, mayor, and vice mayor with the highest number of votes wins the seat; they are voted separately; therefore, they may be of different parties when elected.

=== House of Representatives election ===
==== Lone District ====
Incumbent Vice Mayor Erbie Fabian is running for the post against former Mayor Manuel Dalipe.

2004 Philippine House of Representatives election at Zamboanga City's Lone District
Party	Candidate	Votes	%
LDP	Erbie Fabian	102,915	
Independent	Manuel Dalipe	78,619	
Total votes			100.0
LDP hold			

=== Mayoral elections ===
Incumbent Congressman Celso Lobregat is running for mayor against prominent businessman Lepeng Wee and Councilor Charlie Mariano.

Zamboanga City mayoral election, 2004
Party	Candidate	Votes	%
LDP	Celso Lobregat	113,447	48.34
Independent	Lepeng Wee	70,398	29.99
Independent	Charlie Mariano	49,669	21.16
Independent	Alejandro Guardian	789	0.34
Independent	Abdusalam Angkaya	403	0.17
Total votes		234,706	100.00
LDP hold			

=== Vice-mayoral elections ===
The vice-mayorship is vacant since Vice Mayor Erbie Fabian took office upon Mayor Lobregat's death. Incumbent Councilor Beng Climaco ran against veteran politician Jaime Cabato.

Zamboanga City vice-mayoral election, 2004
Party	Candidate	Votes	%
LDP	Maria Isabelle Climaco	140,225	
Independent	Jaime Cabato	59,989	
Independent	Popoy Tumagidgid	1,376	
Total votes			
LDP hold			

=== City council elections ===
Zamboanga City elects twelve councilors to the city council. The twelve candidates with the highest number of votes wins the seats.

2004 Zamboanga City Council election
- May 10, 2004

All 12 seats from Zamboanga City's lone district 7 seats needed for a majority
	Majority party	Minority party
Leader	Celso Lobregat	Lepeng Wee
Party	LDP	Independent
Leader's seat	Lone District	Lone District
Seats before	12	0
Seats won	10	0
Seat change	▲2	Steady

Coalition	Mayoral/vice mayoral candidate	Total votes		Total seats	
Coalition	Mayoral/vice mayoral candidate	Total	%	Total	%
LDP	Celso Lobregat			12	86%
Independent	Lepeng Wee			0	0%
Total valid votes cast			N/A		
Total turnout					
Total partisan seats				16	88.9%
Seat for Association of Barangay Captains President				1	5.6%
Seat for Association of Sangguniang Kabataan chairmen President				1	5.6%
Total non-partisan seats				2	11.1%
Total seats				14	100.0%

Zamboanga City Council election at Zamboanga City's Lone District, 2004
Party	Candidate	Votes	%
LDP	Milabel Velasquez (incumbent)	131,608	
LDP	Asbi Edding (incumbent)	130,481	
LDP	Mannix Dalipe (incumbent)	122,552	
LDP	Juan Climaco Elago II (incumbent)	115,575	
LDP	Cesar Iturralde (incumbent)	111,276	
LDP	Luis Climaco	104,065	
LDP	Reyniero Candido	103,172	
LDP	Roel Natividad (incumbent)	98,267	
LDP	Cesar Jimenez, Sr. (incumbent)	96,037	
LDP	Rodolfo Lim	94,042	
LDP	Elias Enriquez (incumbent)	85,946	
LDP	Benjamin Guingona III	84,421	
Total votes			
LDP hold			

== See also ==
- Philippine House of Representatives elections in the Zamboanga Peninsula, 2004
- 2004 Philippine general election
