= Government of Zamboanga City =

Philippine city government

The Government of Zamboanga City, also known as the Zamboanga City Government, is the local government unit in-charge of the City of Zamboanga. It is a mayor-council form of government supervised directly by the President of the Philippines and the Secretary of the Interior and Local Government.

The city government has three interdependent branches: the legislative branch, the executive branch, and the judicial branch. The powers of the branches are vested by the 1991 Local Government Code of the Philippines in the following:

- Local legislative power is vested in a unicameral Sangguniang Panglungsod with the vice-mayor as its presiding officer.
- Local executive power is exercised by the government under the leadership of the City Mayor.
- Local judicial power is vested in the Regional Trial Court and lower courts.

== Legislative department ==
The legislative power of the city is vested in the unicameral Sangguniang Panglungsod. It is composed of:

- the Vice Mayor as its presiding officer elected citywide;
- eight (8) councilors representing two of the city legislative districts which are elected for a term of three (3) years;
- Chairman of the Liga ng mga Barangay of the city as ex officio member; and
- President of the Pederasyon ng mga Sangguniang Kabataan of the city as ex officio member.

The elected members can be re-elected but they may not run for a fourth consecutive term.

When a vacancy arises in the Sanggunian, the President of the Philippines shall appoint to fill in the vacancy. In case of vacancy in the representation of the youth and the barangay in the Sanggunian, the said vacancy shall be filled automatically by the official next in rank of the organization concerned.

== Executive department ==
The executive power is vested in the Mayor. The current executive branch is headed by Mayor John M. Dalipe of the Lakas CMD. The mayor is elected by popular vote to a term of three years. The mayor can be re-elected but may not run for a fourth consecutive term.

The second highest official, Vice Mayor Josephine Pareja is also elected by popular vote. The Vice Mayor is first in line to succession if the office of the Mayor is vacant. The vice mayor is the presiding officer of the Sangguniang Panglungsod.

The mayor's assistant's as required by the 1991 Local Government Code are:

- City Treasurer
- City Accountant
- City Budget Officer
- City Planning and Development Coordinator
- City Engineer
- City Health Officer
- City Civil Registrar
- City Administrator
- City Legal Officer
- City Veterinarian
- City Social Welfare and Development Officer
- City General Services Officer

As optional by the 1991 Local Government Code:

- City Architect
- City Information Officer
- City Agriculturist
- City Population Officer
- City Environment and Natural Resources Officer
- City Cooperatives Officer

== Historical governments ==
=== Republic of Zamboanga ===
The Republic of Zamboanga's declared sovereignty lasted from May 18, 1899 until November 16, 1899, wherein its revolutionary government and chosen President, Vicente Álvarez, who led the liberation of the Zamboangueños from the tenuous grip of the retreating Spanish military, along with his victorious troops, exercised de facto sovereignty over administrative functions and military control within their new country territory and was not subordinate or subject to any other government or authority in the Philippines.

Álvarez proclaimed his new Republic of Zamboanga had rule over the entire islands of Mindanao, Basilan, and Sulu - effectively the entire southern Philippines. His claim was grandiose. In reality, the republic's sovereignty extended only over the existing premises of ancient Zamboanga, which can be estimated to be about the same size as present-day Zamboanga City is.

==== Presidents of the Republic ====
	Mayor	Took office	Left office
1	Vicente Alvarez	May 18, 1899	November 16, 1899
2	Isidro Midel	November 16, 1899	March 1901
3	Mariano Arquiza	March 1901	March 1903

=== Under Moro Province ===
In March 1903, Arquiza's government ended and was replaced by a new U.S. governor, also effectively ending the Republic of Zamboanga.

Zamboanga is made capital of consolidated Mindanao, Basilan, and Sulu Archipelago after abolition of the Republic. The Moro Province had 5 districts: Sulu, Zamboanga, Lanao, Cotabato, and Davao.

=== City mayors ===
On recommendation of Governor John J. Pershing, the Legislative Council of the Moro Province passed on September 15, 1911, Act No. 272, converting the municipality of Zamboanga into a city with a commission form of government. Its municipal board consisted of a mayor and two commissioners.

On February 26, 1937, the City Charter of Zamboanga became effective and the new city government was inaugurated headed by a mayor appointed by the President of the Philippine Commonwealth.

With the passage of Republic Act No. 1210 on April 29, 1955, the position of mayor became elective and the post of vice-mayor was created.

Note: The first column consecutively numbers the individuals who have served as chief executive (either mayor or municipal president) of Zamboanga City, while the second column consecutively numbers the individuals who have served as city mayor.

=== Municipal presidents ===
When the Department of Mindanao and Sulu replaced the Moro Province in 1914, the city was reverted to municipality status under the supervision of the province of Zamboanga.

Note: The first column consecutively numbers the individuals who have served as chief executive (either mayor or municipal president) of Zamboanga City, while the second column consecutively numbers the individuals who have served as municipal president.

#		Municipal President	Took office	Left office	Party	Municipal Vice-President	Term	Era
(2)	1	Victoriano Tarrosa	October 16, 1914	1916	Appointed	Pedro Francisco	-	Insular Government
3	2	Alfonso Ramos	1916	1919	Nacionalista	Filomeno Arquiza	1	Insular Government
4	3	Crispin Atilano	1919	1922	Nacionalista	Bernabe Midel	1	Insular Government
5	4	Gregorio Ledesma	1922	1925	Nacionalista	Felipe Ramos	1	Insular Government
6	5	Felipe Ramos	1922	1925	Nacionalista	Jose Sanson	1	Insular Government
6	5	Felipe Ramos	1925	1928	Nacionalista	Jose Sanson	2	Insular Government
6	5	Felipe Ramos	1928	1931	Nacionalista	Antonio Toribio	3	Insular Government
7	6	Antonio Toribio	1931	November 15, 1935	Nacionalista	Juan Sta. Teresa	1	Insular Government
7	6	Antonio Toribio	November 15, 1935	February 25, 1937	Nacionalista	Juan Sta. Teresa	1	Commonwealth
Abolished; Leadership was transferred to the City Mayor when the new City Government was inaugurated. Please refer to the previous table								Commonwealth
11	7	Carlos Camins	1942	1945	Appointed	None	-	Second Republic
Abolished; Leadership was transferred to the City Mayor when the City Government was restored upon the liberation of American and Filipino forces. Please refer to the previous table

== Zamboanga City officials since 2007 ==
=== 2007–2010 ===
Position	Name
Mayor	Hon. Celso Lobregat
Vice Mayor	Hon. Manuel Jose M. Dalipe
First District
Representative	Hon. Maria Isabelle C. Salazar
Councilors	Mariano, Charlie
Councilors	Jimenez, Cesar L.
Councilors	Cabato, Jaime U.
Councilors	Sadain, Melchor Rey K.
Councilors	Abarro, Ethelinda M.
Councilors	Lim, Rodolfo R.
Councilors	Valesco, Rogelio Jr L.
Councilors	Biel, Luis III R.
Second District
Representative	Hon. Erico Basilio A. Fabian
Councilors	Iturralde, Cesar S.
Councilors	Elago, Juan Climaco P.
Councilors	Rodriguez, Edmundo S.
Councilors	Nuño, Lilia M.
Councilors	Natividad, Roel B.
Councilors	Guingona, Benjamin III E.
Councilors	Saavedra, Eduardo Jr T.
Councilors	Candido, Reynerio S.

=== 2010–2013 ===
Position	Name
Mayor	Hon. Celso Lobregat
Vice Mayor	Hon. Cesar Iturralde
First District
Representative	Hon. Maria Isabelle C. Salazar
Councilors	Cabato, Jaime U.
Councilors	Sadain, Melchor Rey K.
Councilors	Jimenez, Cesar L.
Councilors	Bayot, Rodolfo
Councilors	Valesco, Rogelio Jr L.
Councilors	Biel, Luis III R.
Councilors	Lim, Rodolfo R.
Councilors	Abubakar, Myra Paz V
Second District
Representative	Hon. Erico Basilio A. Fabian
Councilors	Nuño, Lilia M.
Councilors	Guingona, Benjamin III
Councilors	Saavedra, Eduardo Jr
Councilors	Candido, Reyniero
Councilors	Agan, Rommel
Councilors	Ramos, Percival
Councilors	Elago, Vincent Paul
Councilors	Edding, Al- Jihan R.

=== 2013–2016 ===
Position	Name
Mayor	Hon. Maria Isabelle C. Salazar
Vice Mayor	Hon. Cesar Iturralde
First District
Representative	Hon. Celso Lobregat
Councilors	Mariano, Charlie
Councilors	Jimenez, Cesar Jr. L.
Councilors	Pareja, Josephine
Councilors	Sadain, Melchor Rey K.
Councilors	Bayot, Rodolfo
Councilors	Abubakar, Myra Paz
Councilors	Valesco, Rogelio Jr L.
Councilors	Biel, Luis III R.
Second District
Representative	Hon. Lilia Macrohon-Nuño
Councilors	Elago, Vincent Paul
Councilors	Elago, Juan Climaco P.
Councilors	Alavar, Miguel III
Councilors	Ramos, Percival
Councilors	Natividad, Roel B.
Councilors	Guingona, Benjamin IV
Councilors	Saavedra, Eduardo Jr T.
Councilors	Agan, Rommel

=== 2016–2019 ===
Position	Name
Mayor	Hon. Maria Isabelle C. Salazar
Vice Mayor	Hon. Cesar Iturralde
First District
Representative	Hon. Celso L. Lobregat
Councilors	Bayot, Rodolfo M.
Councilors	Pareja, Josephine
Councilors	Jimenez, Cesar M.
Councilors	Mariano, Charlie
Councilors	Atilano, Elbert
Councilors	Abubakar, Myra Paz V.
Councilors	Lim, Rodolfo R.
Councilors	Cabato, Marxander Jaime
Second District
Representative	Hon. Manuel Jose Dalipe
Councilors	Elago, Juan Climaco P.
Councilors	Alavar, Miguel III
Councilors	Agan, Rommel
Councilors	Guingona, Benjamin IV
Councilors	Villaflores, Jimmy
Councilors	Edding, Al-Jihan R.
Councilors	Nuño, Lilibeth M.
Councilors	Arquiza, Teodyver A.

=== 2019–2022 ===
Position	Name
Mayor	Hon. Maria Isabelle Climaco-Salazar
Vice Mayor	Hon. Rommel S. Agan
First District
Representative	Hon. Cesar L. Jimenez, Jr.
Councilors	Pareja, Josephine E.
Councilors	Atilano, Elbert
Councilors	Olaso, Khymer Adan T.
Councilors	Macrohon, Joselito A.
Councilors	Valesco, Rogelio Jr L.
Councilors	Jimenez, Cesar M.
Councilors	dela Cruz, Crisanto B.
Councilors	Omaga, El King K.
Second District
Representative	Hon. Manuel Jose M. Dalipe
Councilors	Dalipe, John M.
	Guingona, Benjamin IV
	Elago, Juan Climaco P.
	Nuño, Lilibeth M.
	Alavar, Miguel III C.
	Edding, Al-Jihan R.
	Villaflores, Jimmy B.
	Elago, Vincent Paul A.
Ex-officio Councilors
ABC President	Hon. Jerry E. Perez
SK Federation President	Hon. Cary John O. Pioc
Representative of the Indigenous Peoples	Hon. Tungkuh Hanapi

=== 2022–2025 ===
Position	Name
Mayor	—N/a
Vice Mayor	—N/a
First District
Representative	—N/a
Councilor	—N/a
Second District
Representative	—N/a
Ex-officio Councilors
ABC President	—N/a
SK Federation President	—N/a
Representative of the Indigenous Peoples	—N/a

== 2022 Zamboanga City local elections ==
Local elections were held in Zamboanga City on 9 May 2022, within the Philippine general election. The voters elected for the elective local posts in the city: the mayor, vice mayor, and eight councilors per district.

2022 Zamboanga City local election
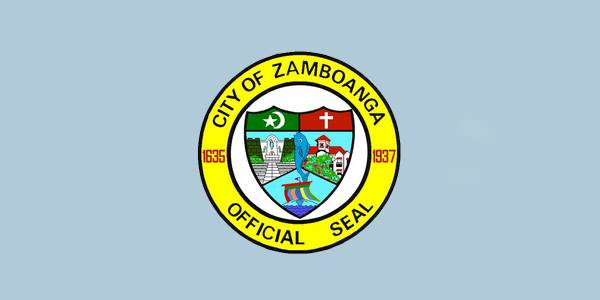
- 9 May 2022
- Mayoral elections
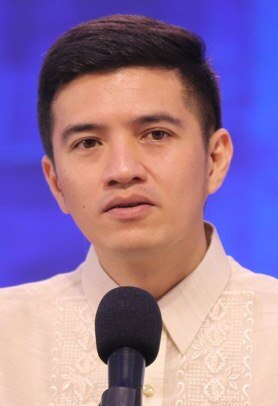

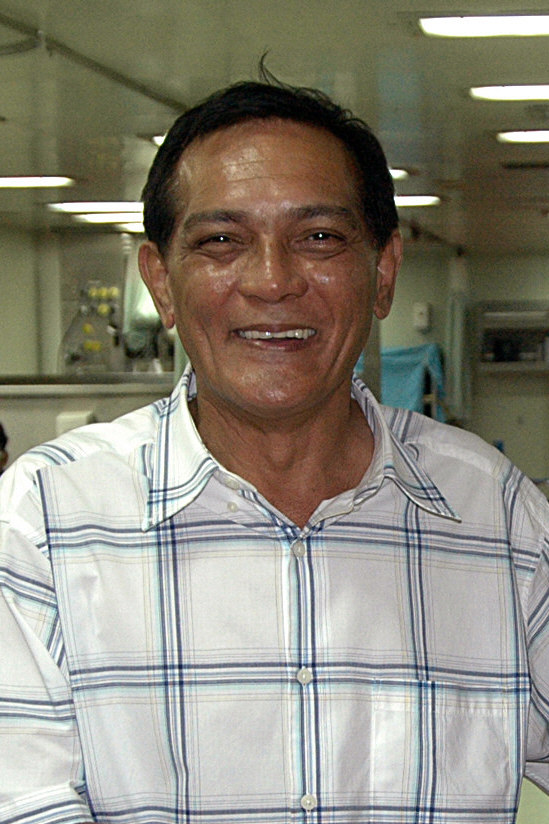
Nominee	John Dalipe	Celso Lobregat
Party	PRP	LDP
Running mate	Mel Sadain (Lakas)	BG Guingona
Popular vote	129,140	91,905
- Vice Mayoral elections
Nominee	Pinpin Pareja	BG Guingona
Party	PAZ	LDP
Popular vote	96,302	91,779
Mayor before election
Maria Isabelle Climaco-Salazar
Liberal
Elected mayor
John Dalipe
PRP
