= 2016 Zamboanga City local elections =

Philippine election

2016 Zamboanga City local election
- May 9, 2016
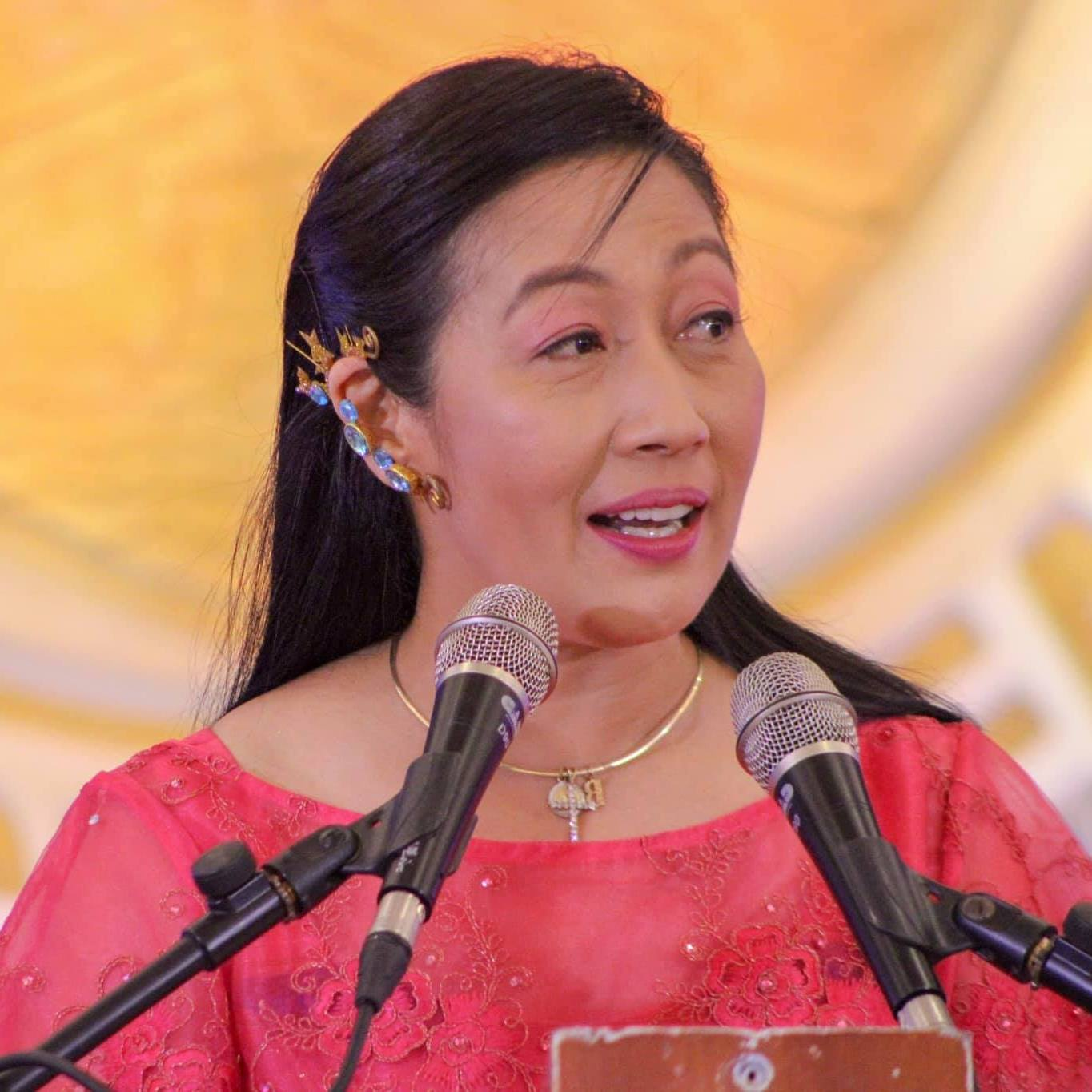
Nominee	Maria Isabelle Climaco Salazar	Mario Yanga	Alberto Cajayon
Party	Liberal	Independent	PDP–Laban
Running mate	Cesar Iturralde	Long Tagayan	Melchor Rey Sadain
Popular vote	175,599	63,066	8,766
Percentage	69.6%	25.0%	3.5%
Mayor before election
Maria Isabelle Climaco Salazar
Liberal
Elected mayor
Maria Isabelle Climaco Salazar
Liberal

Local elections were held in Zamboanga City on May 9, 2016, within the Philippine general election. The voters elected for the elective local posts in the city: the mayor, vice mayor, and eight councilors per district.

== Retiring and term-limited elective officials ==
- Luis Biel III, incumbent District I councilor, term-limited in 2016
- Cesar Jimenez Jr., incumbent District I councilor, term-limited in 2016
- Melchor Sadain, incumbent District I councilor, term-limited in 2016
- Rogelio Valesco Jr., incumbent District I councilor, term-limited in 2016
- Eduardo Saavedra, incumbent District II councilor, term-limited in 2016

== Results ==
The candidates for district representative, mayor, and vice mayor, with the highest number of votes, wins the seat; they are voted separately, therefore they may be of different parties when elected.

=== House of Representatives election ===
==== 1st District ====
Incumbent Congressman Celso Lobregat is running for reelection.

2016 Philippine House of Representatives election at Zamboanga City's 1st district
Party	Candidate	Votes	%
LDP	Celso Lobregat (incumbent)	62,218	52.5
NPC	Crisanto "Monsi" Dela Cruz	36,150	30.3
Independent	Cesar Climaco	15,540	13.0
Independent	Abdulbasir Yasin "Deejay" Tamsilani	2,881	2.4
PDP–Laban	Taib Nasaron	1,872	1.6
Independent	Elmer Pangan	372	0.3
PBM	Anito Tilos	145	0.1
Total votes			100.00
LDP hold			

==== 2nd District ====
District II Representative Lilia Macrohon-Nuño is running for reelection.

2016 Philippine House of Representatives election at Zamboanga City's 2nd district
Party	Candidate	Votes	%
NPC	Mannix Dalipe	69,100	55.3
Nacionalista	Lilia Macrohon-Nuño (incumbent)	48,497	39.2
PDP–Laban	Abdul Karim Ladjamatli	3,983	3.2
PBM	Abu Bakar Barahama	2,973	2.4
Total votes			
NPC gain from Nacionalista			

=== Mayoral elections ===
Mayor Maria Isabelle Climaco Salazar ran for reelection.

2016 Zamboanga City mayoral election
Party	Candidate	Votes	%
Liberal	Beng Climaco	175,599	69.6
Independent	Mario Yanga	63,066	25.0
PDP–Laban	Alberto Cajayon	8,766	3.5
Independent	Nashier Hajim	2,983	1.2
PBM	Nur Sahibul	1,819	0.7
Total votes			
Liberal hold			

=== Vice-mayoral elections ===
Vice Mayor Cesar Iturralde ran for reelection. Although he considered to run for Congress representing District 2, Iturralde decided to back down in attempt to prevent a show-off between incumbent Mayor Beng Climaco and incumbent 1st district representative Celso Lobregat.

2016 Zamboanga City Vice Mayoral Election
Party	Candidate	Votes	%
Liberal	Cesar Iturralde	132,437	54.1
PDP–Laban	Melchor Rey Sadain	74,415	30.4
Independent	Noning Biel	31,244	12.8
PBM	Alih Andaing Adjarani	4,701	1.9
Independent	Long Tagayan	2,172	0.9
Total votes			
Liberal hold			

=== City Council elections ===
Each of Zamboanga City's two legislative districts elects eight councilors to the City Council. The eight candidates with the highest number of votes wins the seats per district.

2016 Zamboanga City Council election
- May 9, 2016

All 8 seats from each of Zamboanga City's two legislative districts 10 seats needed for a majority
	Majority party	Minority party	Third party
Leader	Celso Lobregat	Maria Isabelle Climaco Salazar	Juan Climaco Elago II
Party	LDP	Liberal	UNA
Leader's seat	1st District	1st District	2nd District
Seats before	8	1	3
Seats won	7	6	3
Seat change	▼1	▲5	Steady

Party	Party leader	Total votes		Total seats	
Party	Party leader	Total	%	Total	%
LDP	Celso Lobregat			7	36.8%
Liberal	Maria Isabelle Climaco Salazar			6	31.6%
UNA	Juan Climaco Elago II			3	15.7%
Independents	Varies			0	0.0%
Total valid votes cast			N/A		
Total turnout					
Total partisan seats				16	84.2%
Seat for Association of Barangay Captains President				1	5.2%
Seat for Association of Sangguniang Kabataan chairmen President				1	5.2%
Seat for Mandatory Representative for Indigenous Peoples				1	5.2%
Total non-partisan seats				3	15.7%
Total seats				19	100.0%

==== 1st District ====
Council election at Zamboanga City's 1st district
Party	Candidate	Votes	%	±%
Liberal	Rodolfo Bayot (incumbent)	72,684		
Liberal	Josephine Pareja (incumbent)	66,154		
Liberal	Cesar Jimenez, Sr.	64,163		
LDP	Charlie Mariano (incumbent)	60,246		
Liberal	Elbert Atilano	55,649		
LDP	Myra Paz Abubakar (incumbent)	52,820		
LDP	Rodolfo Lim	43,888		
LDP	Marxander Jaime "Boday" Cabato	42,623		
LDP	Joselito Macrohon	39,594		
Independent	King Omaga	33,589		
Liberal	Michael Kelly Tiu-Lim	31,959		
AZAP	Kaiser Adan Olaso	29,434		
Liberal	Rodrigo Pagotaisidro	27,642		
Independent	Hado Edding	26,523		
Liberal	Rey "Boy" P. Modillas	25,140		
LDP	Katala Liozo	22,850		
Independent	Abraham Sakandal	17,165		
LDP	Haj Sandag	9,600		
PBM	Yasser Amin	8,908		
KBL	Marlon Torres	8,809		
PDP–Laban	Sulaiman Sali	7,831		
Independent	Ronnie Gregorio	7,825		
KBL	Rene Salazar	7,813		
PDP–Laban	Rustan Mohammad	6,499		
KBL	Joselito Bernardo	6,167		
PBM	Jemar Barahim	5,804		
PBM	Habib Sabrie Jul	5,281		
Independent	Dan-Dan Antonio	4,099		
PBM	Zulfikar Jadjurie	3,941		
Independent	Edris Salahiron	3,734		
PBM	Datu Luis Mandiade, Sr.	3,629		
PDP–Laban	Nard Dolloso	3,583		
PDP–Laban	Nicole Anne Hapas	2,792		
PBM	Ibnohajar Binang	2,684		
PDP–Laban	Hams Ferwin Bernal	2,613		
PBM	Nihang Arkan	2,532		
Independent	Ramada Jose	2,257		
Total votes				

==== 2nd District ====
Council election at Zamboanga City's 2nd district
Party	Candidate	Votes	%	±%
UNA	Juan Climaco Elago II (incumbent)	63,123		
LDP	Miguel Alavar III (incumbent)	55,990		
UNA	Rommel Agan (incumbent)	55,006		
LDP	Benjamin Guingona IV (incumbent)	54,617		
Liberal	Jimmy Villaflores	51,473		
UNA	Jihan Edding	49,057		
LDP	Lilibeth Nuño	45,892		
Liberal	Teodyver Arquiza	45,732		
Liberal	Roel Natividad (incumbent)	39,315		
LDP	Percival Ramos (incumbent)	39,156		
Liberal	Ramon Saavedra	38,480		
LDP	Rey Candido	34,739		
Independent	Fred Atilano	31,601		
AZAP	Vincent Paul Elago (incumbent)	26,132		
Liberal	Rudy Quinday	24,990		
LDP	Kit Barredo	24,208		
Independent	Abelardo Climaco, Jr.	22,783		
Independent	Efren Perez	15,766		
Independent	Gerasimo Acuña	13,910		
LDP	Agustin Graciano, Jr.	10,990		
PBM	Hadji Jhay Abdulkahil	10,869		
Independent	Quirico Duterte, Jr.	10,574		
PDP–Laban	Pendatun Talib	8,789		
PBM	Abdilla Jamhali	8,501		
NPC	MM Lozano	7,798		
PBM	Alsim Kasim	7,310		
PDP–Laban	Albino Perez	6,989		
PBM	Jonatahan Roxas	5,962		
PBM	Jumahalia Amiradjam	5,701		
PDP–Laban	Hussayin Arpa	4,396		
PBM	Sonny Boy Hussein	3,840		
PDP–Laban	Dorita Ortega	3,508		
PDP–Laban	Robinson Wee	2,774		
PDP–Laban	Florinda Teves	2,630		
PDP–Laban	Rosemary Beldan	2,472		
PBM	Arola Tingkong	2,292		
PBM	Arsadap Asta	1,661		
Total votes				

== See also ==
- Philippine House of Representatives elections in the Zamboanga Peninsula, 2016
- 2016 Philippine general election
