= 2007 Zamboanga City local elections =

Philippine election

2007 Zamboanga City mayoralty election
- May 14, 2007
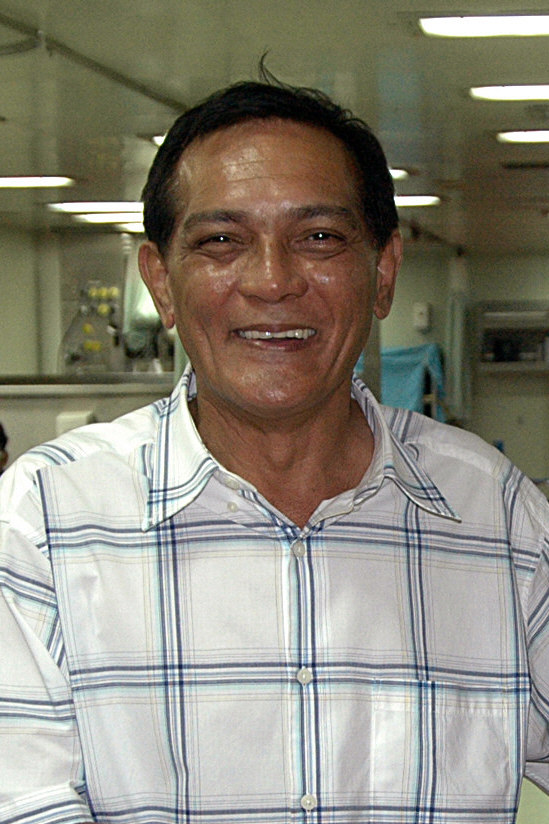
Nominee	Celso Lobregat	Crisanto dela Cruz
Party	LDP	KAMPI	Independent
Running mate	Milabel Velasquez	Victor Solis	Mannix Dalipe
Popular vote	110,867	29,923
Percentage	58.15	39.82
Mayor before election
Celso Lobregat
LDP
Elected mayor
Celso Lobregat
LDP

Local elections was held in Zamboanga City on May 14, 2007, within the Philippine general election. The voters elected for the elective local posts in the city: the mayor, vice mayor, and eight councilors per district. Previously, the city voters elected 12 councilors and one representative from its lone district.

== Political changes ==
Since 1984, Zamboanga City is represented in the national Congress by one representative. All things changed in 2004 when the lone district was divided into 2 districts by virtue of Republic Act No. 9269 on March 19, 2004. Veterans Avenue is the dividing line of the two districts.

== Mayoral and vice mayoral elections ==
Monsignor Crisanto dela Cruz formed a coalition named Nuevo Zamboanga under the banner of Kabalikat ng Malayang Pilipino of President Gloria Macapagal Arroyo to run against the incumbent administrator of Mayor Celso Lobregat of the Laban ng Demokratikong Pilipino. Lobregat picked incumbent Councilor Milabel Velasquez as his running mate while dela Cruz picked activist Atty. Victor Solis as his running mate.

== Results ==
The candidates for district representative, mayor, and vice mayor with the most votes win the seat; they are voted separately, therefore, they may be of different parties when elected.

District I City Election Officer Roel Bengua, also chairman of the City Board of Canvassers, proclaimed Mayor Celso Lobregat retaining his post, incumbent Councilor Mannix Dalipe as Vice-Mayor, incumbent Vice-Mayor Beng Climaco as District I Representative, Congressman Erbie Fabian as District II Representative, and the 16 City Councilors.

=== House of Representatives election ===
==== 1st District ====
Incumbent Vice-Mayor Maria Isabelle Climaco is running for the post against neophyte politician Edilberto Gonzales.

2007 Philippine House of Representatives election at Zamboanga City's 1st district
Party	Candidate	Votes	%
LDP	Maria Isabelle Climaco	54,468	
KAMPI	Edilberto Gonzales	30,518	
Total votes			100.0
LDP hold			

==== 2nd District ====
Incumbent Representative Erbie Fabian is running for a second term.

2007 Philippine House of Representatives election at Zamboanga City's 2nd district
Party	Candidate	Votes	%
LDP	Erbie Fabian (incumbent)	60,632	
KAMPI	Susan delos Reyes	19,419	
Independent	Samuel Enesando	4,400	
Total votes			100.0
LDP hold			

=== Mayoral elections ===
Incumbent Mayor Celso Lobregat is running for his second term. His main opponent is former Catholic priest Crisanto dela Cruz.

Zamboanga City mayoral election, 2007
Party	Candidate	Votes	%
LDP	Celso Lobregat (incumbent)	110,867	58.15
KAMPI	Crisanto dela Cruz	75,928	39.82
Independent	Cleofe Carmelita Cajucom	2,960	1.55
Independent	Sonny Sakilin	902	0.47
Total votes		190,657	100.00
LDP hold			

=== Vice-mayoral elections ===
Incumbent Vice-Mayor Beng Climaco is running for District I Representative. Councilor Mila Velasquez was Mayor Lobregat's running-mate against Monsi dela Cruz' candidate, Atty. Vic Solis.

Zamboanga City vice-mayoral election, 2007
Party	Candidate	Votes	%
Independent	Mannix Dalipe	75,630	41.07
LDP	Milabel Velasquez	50,970	27.68
Independent	Rodolfo Bayot	39,794	21.61
KAMPI	Vicente Solis	14,265	7.75
Independent	Ismail Jaalam	3,482	1.89
Total votes		184,141	100.00
Independent gain from LDP			

=== City Council elections ===
Each of Zamboanga City's two legislative districts elects eight councilors to the City Council. The eight candidates with the most votes wins the seats per district.

2007 Zamboanga City Council election
- May 14, 2007

All 8 seats from each of Zamboanga City's two legislative districts 9 seats needed for a majority
	Majority party	Minority party	Third party
Leader	Celso Lobregat	Crisanto dela Cruz	Charlie Mariano
Party	LDP	KAMPI	Independent
Leader's seat	1st District	1st District	1st District
Seats before	12	0	0
Seats won	12	3	1
Seat change	Steady	▲3	▲1
Popular vote		117,939	47,456

Coalition	Mayoral/vice mayoral candidate	Total votes		Total seats	
Coalition	Mayoral/vice mayoral candidate	Total	%	Total	%
LDP	Celso Lobregat			12	66.7%
KAMPI	Crisanto dela Cruz			3	16.7%
Independents	Varies			1	5.6%
Total valid votes cast			N/A		
Total turnout					
Total partisan seats				16	88.9%
Seat for Association of Barangay Captains President				1	5.6%
Seat for Association of Sangguniang Kabataan chairmen President				1	5.6%
Total non-partisan seats				2	11.1%
Total seats				18	100.0%

==== 1st District ====
Zamboanga City Council election at Zamboanga City's 1st district, 2007
Party	Candidate	Votes	%
Independent	Charlie Mariano	47,456	
LDP	Cesar Jimenez, Jr.	44,202	
KAMPI	Jaime Cabato	43,304	
KAMPI	Melchor Sadain	40,827	
LDP	Lynet Marcos-Abarro	39,101	
LDP	Rodolfo Lim (incumbent)	38,267	
LDP	Rogelio Valesco, Jr.	34,701	
KAMPI	Luis Biel III	33,808	
LDP	Antonio Orendain, Jr.	33,626	
KAMPI	Ricardo Baban, Jr.	30,426	
LDP	Victor Alvarez	29,404	
LDP	Mario Roca	28,072	
Independent	Roberto Ko	27,517	
Independent	Max Enriquez	25,595	
LDP	Manuelito Luna	25,523	
KAMPI	Venusto Anova	19,903	
KAMPI	Joaquin Diaz	16,608	
KAMPI	Edris Lim	15,780	
KAMPI	Giovanni Luistro	14,454	
Independent	Basilio Rusil	8,908	
Independent	Abdurrahman Tugayan	3,990	
Total votes			
LDP hold			

==== 2nd District ====
Zamboanga City Council election at Zamboanga City's 1st district, 2007
Party	Candidate	Votes	%
LDP	Asbi Edding (incumbent)	56,496	
LDP	Juan Climaco Elago II (incumbent)	50,297	
LDP	Cesar Iturralde (incumbent)	46,723	
LDP	Lilia Macrohon-Nuño	43,911	
LDP	Roel Natividad (incumbent)	42,389	
LDP	Benjamin Guingona III (incumbent)	40,195	
LDP	Eduardo Saavedra, Jr.	39,305	
LDP	Reyniero Candido (incumbent)	39,278	
Independent	Luis Climaco (incumbent)	37,144	
KAMPI	Gerasimo Acuña	23,210	
KAMPI	Jaime Villaflores	22,078	
KAMPI	Rene Natividad	19,991	
KAMPI	Reyniero Camins	18,769	
Independent	Susan Cabato	18,519	
KAMPI	Ernesto Perez	17,744	
KAMPI	Abelardo Dondoyano	14,059	
KAMPI	Mercy Arquiza-Fernandez	11,554	
KAMPI	Manuel Jose Fabian	9,453	
Total votes			
LDP hold			

== See also ==
- Philippine House of Representatives elections in the Zamboanga Peninsula, 2007
- 2007 Philippine general election
