= 2010 Zamboanga City local elections =

Philippine election

2010 Zamboanga City mayoralty election
- May 10, 2010
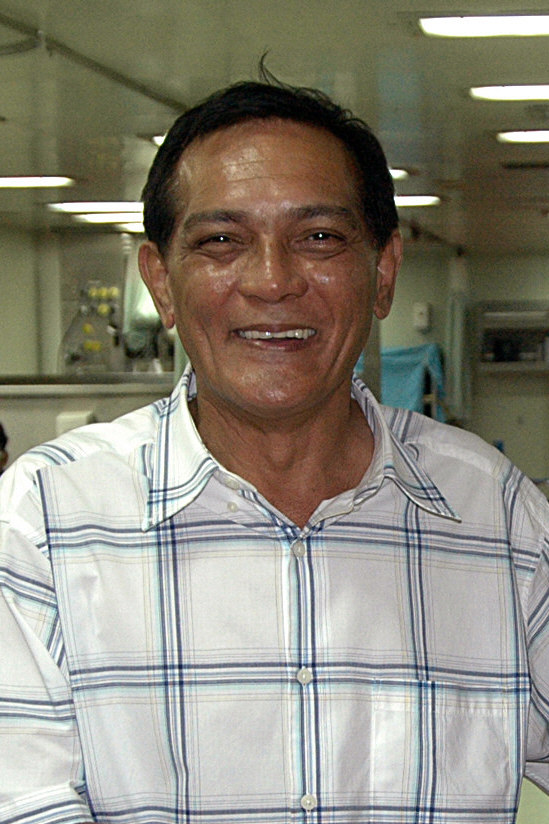

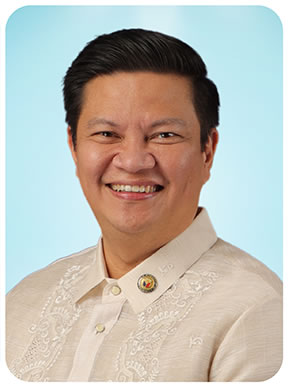
Nominee	Celso Lobregat	Mannix Dalipe
Party	LDP	NPC
Running mate	Cesar Ituralde	Crisanto dela Cruz
Popular vote	118,227	81,564
Percentage	57.99	40.00
Mayor before election
Celso Lobregat
LDP
Elected mayor
Celso Lobregat
LDP

Local elections were held in Zamboanga City on May 10, 2010, within the Philippine general election. The voters elect for the elective local posts in the city: the mayor, vice mayor, and eight councilors per district.

== Summary ==
Incumbent Mayor Celso Lobregat decided to run for a last third term for the mayorship. Incumbent Vice-Mayor Mannix Dalipe runs against Lobregat under the banner of the Nationalist People's Coalition.

Lobregat picks District II Councilor Cesar Iturralde as his running mate. Dalipe picks former Monsignor Crisanto dela Cruz as his running mate. Dela Cruz previously fought Lobregat for the mayorship last 2007 but lost.

== Results ==
The candidates for mayor and vice mayor with the highest number of votes wins the seat; they are voted separately, therefore, they may be of different parties when elected.

=== Mayoral elections ===
Incumbent Mayor Celso Lobregat is in his second term and is eligible for reelection.

Zamboanga City mayoral election
Party	Candidate	Votes	%
LDP	Celso Lobregat (incumbent)	118,227	57.99
NPC	Mannix Dalipe	81,564	40.00
Independent	Abdila Jamhali	2,258	1.11
Independent	Cleofe Carmelita Cajucom	1,843	0.90
Total votes		203,892	100.00
LDP hold			

=== Vice-mayoral elections ===
Incumbent Vice-Mayor Manuel Jose "Mannix" Dalipe was an Independent before running for mayor under the banner of Nationalist People's Coalition.

Zamboanga City Vice Mayoral Election
Party	Candidate	Votes	%
LDP	Cesar Ituralde	78,827	40.29
NPC	Crisanto dela Cruz	45,330	23.17
Aksyon	Charlie Mariano	43,597	22.28
CCA	Roel Natividad	25,786	13.18
Independent	Arola Tingkong	1,372	0.70
PGRP	Cresente Elema	729	0.37
Total votes		195,641	100.00
LDP gain from NPC			

=== City Council elections ===
Each of Zamboanga City's two legislative districts elects eight councilors to the City Council. The eight candidates with the highest number of votes wins the seats per district.

2010 Zamboanga City Council election
- May 10, 2010

All 8 seats from each of Zamboanga City's two legislative districts 9 seats needed for a majority
	Majority party	Minority party	Third party
Leader	Celso Lobregat	Manuel Jose Dalipe	Charlie Mariano
Party	LDP	NPC	Aksyon
Leader's seat	1st District	2nd District	1st District
Seats before	12	3	1
Seats won	12	4	0
Seat change	Steady	▲1	▼1
Popular vote	668,703	476,976	70,305

Party	Votes	%	Seats
Laban ng Demokratikong Pilipino	668,703	50.31	12
Nationalist People's Coalition	476,976	35.89	4
Aksyon Demokratiko	70,305	5.29	0
Citizens Call for Action Party	30,410	2.29	0
Philippine Green Republican Party	20,494	1.54	0
Independent	62,266	4.68	0
Ex officio seats			2
Total	1,329,154	100.00	18

==== 1st District ====
Zamboanga City Council election at Zamboanga City's 1st district
Party	Candidate	Votes	%
LDP	Jaime Cabato (incumbent)	62,042	
NPC	Melchor Sadain (incumbent)	58,733	
NPC	Cesar Jimenez, Jr. (incumbent)	56,355	
NPC	Rodolfo Bayot	55,287	
LDP	Rogelio Valesco, Jr. (incumbent)	54,117	
LDP	Luis Biel III (incumbent)	51,573	
LDP	Rodolfo Lim (incumbent)	48,091	
LDP	Myra Paz Valderrosa-Abubakar	41,534	
LDP	Josephine Pareja	41,271	
LDP	Kaiser Adan Olaso	36,171	
Aksyon	Henry Mariano	36,064	
LDP	Elbert Atilano	31,677	
Aksyon	Jaime Rebollos	23,142	
NPC	Abraham Sakandal	21,020	
NPC	Allan Cajucom	18,269	
NPC	Larry Silva	17,995	
NPC	Joselito Bernardo	13,562	
Aksyon	Manuel Fraginal	11,099	
Independent	Eduardo Buendia	10,953	
Independent	Luisitio Lacson	9,462	
NPC	Marlon Torres	9,221	
Independent	Gerardo Fernandez	6,471	
Independent	Abdurrahman Tagayan	4,774	
Independent	Wedito Cata-an	2,545	
Independent	Erlinda Buñag	2,206	
Independent	Estrella Paradillo	2,094	
Total votes			
LDP hold			

==== 2nd District ====
Zamboanga City Council election at Zamboanga City's 2nd district
Party	Candidate	Votes	%
LDP	Lilia Macrahon-Nuño (incumbent)	54,536	
LDP	Benjamin Guingona III (incumbent)	47,811	
LDP	Eduardo Saavedra, Jr. (incumbent)	44,833	
LDP	Reyniero Candido (incumbent)	44,520	
NPC	Rommel Agan	40,281	
LDP	Percival Ramos	37,731	
LDP	Vincent Paul Elago	36,693	
NPC	Al-Jihan Edding	35,785	
LDP	Miguel Alavar III	35,779	
LDP	Roseller Natividad	35,426	
NPC	Susan delos Reyes	35,261	
NPC	John Dalipe	33,560	
Independent	Rene Natividad	30,533	
NPC	Gerasimo Acuña	28,738	
NPC	Jaime Villaflores	25,652	
CCA	Jose Manuel Fabian	14,662	
NPC	Jerico Jan Bustamante	13,532	
NPC	Efren Ramos	13,418	
CCA	Resurrecion Miravite	10,128	
Independent	Mujib Abdulmunib	7,288	
Independent	Ambra Jamhali	4,486	
PGRP	Edjong Sattar	3,722	
Independent	Taib Nasaron	3,155	
PGRP	Arnold Navarro	3,028	
Independent	Ernesto Gadon	2,641	
Independent	Jerry Tingkong	2,363	
Total votes			
LDP hold			

===== Edding-Alavar dispute =====
Miguel Alavar III, defeated candidate of the Laban ng Demokratikong Pilipino for the city council's second district, together with Roseller Natividad petitioned for the annulment of the proclamation and correction of errors in the election returns, canvassing of votes and tabulation against the board of election inspectors (BEI) of precincts 371 of Barangay Talon-Talon and precinct 394 of Barangay Tetuan, the City Board of Canvassers proclaimed Al-Jihan Edding as winner by 6 votes.

Zamboanga City Council Eighth Post election at Zamboanga City's 2nd district
Party	Candidate	Votes	%
NPC	Al-Jihan Edding	35,785	
LDP	Miguel Alavar III	35,779	

On March 28, 2011, the City Board of Canvassers as directed by the Commission on Elections nullified the proclamation of Edding and declared Alavar as the rightful 8th member of the Sangguniang Panglungsod.

Zamboanga City Council Eighth Post election at Zamboanga City's 2nd district
Party	Candidate	Votes	%
LDP	Miguel Alavar III	36,103	
NPC	Al-Jihan Edding	36,092	
