= Mannix Dalipe =

Filipino politician (born 1973)

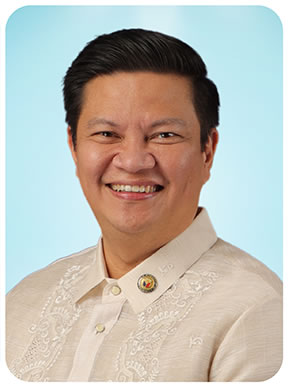
- Official portrait, 2022

House Majority Leader
- In office July 25, 2022 – June 30, 2025
- Speaker: Martin Romualdez
- Preceded by: Martin Romualdez
- Succeeded by: Sandro Marcos

Member of Philippine House of Representatives for Zamboanga City's 2nd district
- In office June 30, 2016 – June 30, 2025
- Preceded by: Lilia Macrohon-Nuño
- Succeeded by: Jerry Perez
House positions
Chair of the House Committee on the Welfare of Children
In office February 6, 2019 – June 30, 2019
Preceded by	Divina Grace Yu
Succeeded by	Yedda Romualdez

Vice Mayor of Zamboanga City
- In office June 30, 2007 – June 30, 2010
- Mayor: Celso Lobregat
- Preceded by: Beng Climaco
- Succeeded by: Cesar Iturralde

Member of the Zamboanga City Council
- In office June 30, 1998 – June 30, 2007

Executive Vice President of Lakas–CMD
- Incumbent
- Assumed office February 3, 2023
- Preceded by: Mikey Arroyo

Personal details
- Born: Manuel Jose Mendoza Dalipe; January 27, 1973 (age 53) San Miguel, Manila, Philippines
- Party: Lakas (2020–present)
- Other political affiliations: NPC (2010–2013; 2016–2020); UNA (2013–2016); Independent (2007–2010); LDP (2001–2007); LAMMP (1998–2001)
- Spouse: Keenah Vidas
- Relatives: John Dalipe (brother)
- Education: De La Salle–College of Saint Benilde; Ateneo de Zamboanga University (MBA)

Manuel Jose "Mannix" Mendoza Dalipe (Tagalog pronunciation: [ˈmanɪks daˈlipɛ]; born January 27, 1973) is a Filipino politician who served as the representative for Zamboanga City's 2nd congressional district in the Philippine House of Representatives from 2019 to 2025 and concurrently as House majority leader from 2022 to 2025. Currently a member of Lakas–CMD, he previously served as the vice mayor of Zamboanga City from 2007 to 2010 and as a member of the Zamboanga City Council from 1998 to 2007.

== Early life and education ==
Manuel Jose Mendoza Dalipe was born on January 27, 1973, in San Miguel, Manila, to former Zamboanga City mayor Manuel Dalipe and Maria Rosario Mendoza. His father served as vice mayor of Zamboanga City from 1980 to 1984, when he succeeded Cesar Climaco as mayor following the latter's assassination.

Dalipe attended De La Salle–College of Saint Benilde for his college education and earned a master's degree in business administration from Ateneo de Zamboanga University.

== Zamboanga City Council (1998–2007) ==
Dalipe began his political career when he was elected to the Zamboanga City Council in 1998. He was reelected twice, in 2001 and 2004, under Laban ng Demokratikong Pilipino (LDP), before becoming term-limited and running for city vice mayor in 2007. As councilor, he chaired the council's committee on youth.

== Vice Mayor of Zamboanga City (2007–2010) ==
In 2007, Dalipe ran as an independent candidate for vice mayor. Incumbent mayor Celso Lobregat of LDP won a second term, while Dalipe defeated his running mate, Milabel Velasquez, by over 25,000 votes.

== Mayoralty and first congressional bids (2010–2016) ==
Dalipe, under the Nationalist People's Coalition (NPC), challenged Lobregat in the 2010 election for mayor of Zamboanga City but lost, having received 81,564 votes against Lobregat's 118,227.

In 2013, Dalipe ran for Zamboanga City's 2nd congressional district in the House of Representatives under a coalition involving the local non-government organization Zamboangueños for the Transformation of Zamboanga and the United Nationalist Alliance, led by former Zamboanga del Norte congressman Romeo Jalosjos Sr., who was also a candidate for mayor. Dalipe finished third in the election, behind winner Lilia Macrohon-Nuño of the all-independent coalition Fuerza Zamboanga and Jose Lobregat of the Adelante Zamboanga Party, who ran under the administration-backed Team PNoy coalition.

== House of Representatives (2016–2025) ==
=== First term (2016–2019) ===
Official portrait of Dalipe in the 17th Congress

Dalipe won his first term as representative for Zamboanga City's 2nd district in 2016, having rejoined NPC, when he defeated Macrohon-Nuño, who ran for reelection under the Nacionalista Party.

During the 17th Congress, Dalipe was elected vice chairperson of the House committees on Higher and Technical Education, National Defense and Security, and Public Works and Highways. He was also a member of 11 other committees for the majority bloc. He was elected chairman of the House Committee on the Welfare of Children on February 6, 2019, replacing Zamboanga del Sur representative Divina Grace Yu.

Dalipe principally authored and co-authored 170 legislative measures in his first term as congressman, several of which were passed into law. These included House Bill No. 4767, enacted as Republic Act No. 10928, which extended the validity of Philippine passports under the Philippine Passport Act of 1996; House Bill No. 6221, enacted as Republic Act No. 11055, known as the Philippine Identification System Act, which established PhilSys; House Bill No. 6573, enacted as Republic Act No. 11053, or the Anti-Hazing Act of 2018; House Bill No. 6742, enacted as Republic Act No. 11087, which increased the bed capacity of the Zamboanga City Medical Center from 500 to 800; and House Bill No. 6775, enacted as Republic Act No. 11201, which created the Department of Human Settlements and Urban Development.

=== Second term (2019–2022) ===
Dalipe ran for reelection in 2019, defeating former representatives Lilia Macrohon-Nuño and Erbie Fabian, as well as vice mayor Cesar Iturralde.

During the 18th Congress, Dalipe was elected vice chairperson of the Committee on Appropriations and served as a member of the committees on National Defense and Security, Public Order and Safety, and Welfare of Children as part of the majority bloc.

Dalipe supported the presidential and vice presidential bids of Bongbong Marcos and Sara Duterte, respectively, in the 2022 presidential election, despite not being endorsed by Duterte for the congressional race, as she instead backed only 1st district candidate and incumbent city mayor Beng Climaco. He was later designated a regular member of the joint congressional committee tasked with canvassing votes in the presidential election.

=== Third term and House majority leader (2022–2025) ===
Dalipe (fourth from right) takes his oath as House majority leader before speaker Martin Romualdez on July 26, 2022

Dalipe (third from right) during the signing of the 2025 General Appropriations Act in Malacañang on December 30, 2024

In September 2020, Dalipe left NPC to join Lakas–CMD, led by then-House majority leader Martin Romualdez, ahead of the upcoming elections. He won a third consecutive term as representative.

On July 25, 2022, at the start of the 19th Congress, Dalipe was elected majority floor leader and chairman of the House Committee on Rules after being nominated by Cavite 2nd district representative Lani Mercado. He succeeded Romualdez, who was elected speaker of the House. He is the second House majority leader from Mindanao, after Prospero Nograles. In November of the same year, Dalipe co-authored House Bill No. 6398, which sought to create the Maharlika Investment Fund, and was designated legislative caretaker of Zamboanga del Norte's 1st district until the electoral dispute between candidates Bullet Jalosjos and Pinpin Uy was resolved.

Dalipe was elected executive vice president of Lakas–CMD on February 3, 2023.

In a survey conducted by the RP-Mission and Development Foundation from June 25 to July 5, 2023, Dalipe ranked third alongside four other representatives among the country's top-performing legislators, receiving a 91.34% rating from constituents.

In November 2023, Dalipe called on former president Rodrigo Duterte to “spare” members of the Armed Forces of the Philippines (AFP) and the Philippine National Police (PNP) from “partisan intrigues” that could cast doubt on their professionalism, after Duterte warned Congress about alleged connivance between lawmakers and uniformed personnel.

He supported attempts to amend the 1987 Constitution, describing the filing of Senate President Juan Miguel Zubiri's Resolution of Both Houses No. 6, which called for a constituent assembly, as "finally seeing the light," amid disagreements between the Senate and the House over charter change.

In July 2024, Dalipe described a circulating artificial intelligence (AI)-generated deepfake video depicting a man whom supporters of former president Duterte alleged to be President Bongbong Marcos as a malicious and desperate attempt to damage Marcos's reputation.

On February 5, 2025, Dalipe led the floor proceedings during the first impeachment of Vice President Sara Duterte and became the third lawmaker among the 215 who signed the impeachment complaint against her. In the same month, Dalipe questioned the timing of graft and criminal complaints filed against him and other representatives by allies of former president Duterte, including former speaker Pantaleon Alvarez, lawyers Ferdinand Topacio and Virgilio Garcia, and senatorial candidate Jimmy Bondoc. The complaints concerned alleged insertions in the 2025 national budget. Dalipe described them as retaliatory tactics intended to deflect attention from the real issue of the "proper and lawful use of taxpayer money."

In April 2025, Dalipe filed a cyberlibel complaint against The Manila Times over a report linking him to a document allegedly prepared by the administration coalition Alyansa para sa Bagong Pilipinas to target the Duterte opposition senatorial slate in the midterm elections.

=== Committee membership ===
==== 19th Congress ====
- Committee on Rules (ex-officio member of all standing committees as majority leader)

==== 18th Congress ====
- Committee on Appropriations (Vice Chair)
- Committee on National Defense and Security
- Committee on Public Order and Safety
- Committee on the Welfare of Children

==== 17th Congress ====
- Committee on the Welfare of Children (Chair)
- Committee on Higher and Technical Education (Vice Chair)
- Committee on National Defense and Security (Vice Chair)
- Committee on Public Works and Highways (Vice Chair)
- Committee on Aquaculture and Fisheries Resources
- Committee on Basic Education and Culture
- Special Committee on the East ASEAN Growth Area
- Committee on Economic Affairs
- Committee on Interparliamentary Relations and Diplomacy
- Committee on Mindanao Affairs
- Committee on Public Order and Safety
- Special Committee on Reforestation
- Committee on Transportation
- Committee on Veterans Affairs and Welfare
- Committee on Ways and Means

== Second mayoralty bid and post-congressional career (2025–present) ==
Dalipe launched his second bid for mayor of Zamboanga City in October 2024, filing his certificate of candidacy alongside his brother John Dalipe, who ran for his congressional seat. He lost to former 1st district representative Khymer Adan Olaso by a margin of 47,000 votes.

In May 2026, the Office of the Ombudsman stated that Dalipe and other lawmakers were under investigation in connection with their membership in the small committees in the House and Senate that helped finalize the 2025 national budget.

== Personal life ==
Dalipe is married to Keenah Vidas. He and four relatives tested positive for COVID-19 in January 2021.

== Electoral history ==
Electoral history of Mannix Dalipe
Year	Office	Party	Votes received				Result
Year	Office	Party	Total	%	P.	Swing	Result
1998	Councilor (Zamboanga City–2nd)	LAMMP	69,204	—N/a	6th	—N/a	Won
2001	Councilor (Zamboanga City–2nd)	LDP	81,515	—N/a	3rd	—N/a	Won
2004	Councilor (Zamboanga City–2nd)	LDP	122,552	9.59%	3rd	—N/a	Won
2007	Vice Mayor of Zamboanga City	Independent	75,630	41.07%	1st	—N/a	Won
2010	Mayor of Zamboanga City	NPC	81,564	40.00%	2nd	—N/a	Lost
2025	Mayor of Zamboanga City	Lakas	122,336	34.31%	2nd	−5.69	Lost
2013	Representative (Zamboanga City–2nd)	UNA	25,242	22.53%	3rd	—N/a	Lost
2016	Representative (Zamboanga City–2nd)	NPC	69,100	55.48%	1st	+32.95	Won
2019	Representative (Zamboanga City–2nd)	NPC	77,521	60.98%	1st	+5.50	Won
2022	Representative (Zamboanga City–2nd)	Lakas	88,784	53.99%	1st	−6.99	Won

House of Representatives of the Philippines
Preceded by Martin Romualdez	House Majority Leader; 2022–2025	Succeeded by Sandro Marcos
Preceded by Lilia Macrohon-Nuño	Member of the Philippine House of Representatives for Zamboanga City's 2nd district 2016–2025	Succeeded by Jerry Perez
Political offices
Preceded by Beng Climaco	Vice Mayor of Zamboanga City; 2007–2010	Succeeded by Cesar Iturralde
Party political offices
Preceded by Mikey Arroyo	Executive Vice President of Lakas–CMD; 2023–present	Incumbent
