= Philippine House Committee on Rules =

Standing committee of the House of Representatives of the Philippines

Committee on Rules
- 20th Congress

History
- New session started: July 28, 2025

Leadership
- Majority Leader: Sandro Marcos (Ilocos Norte–1st, PFP)
- Senior Deputy Majority Leader: Lorenz Defensor (Iloilo–3rd, NUP)
- Minority Leader: Marcelino Libanan (4Ps)
- Senior Deputy Minority Leader: Leila de Lima (ML)

Website
- Committee on Rules

The Philippine House Committee on Rules, or House Rules Committee is a standing committee of the Philippine House of Representatives.

== Jurisdiction ==
As prescribed by House Rules, the committee's jurisdiction includes the following:

- Creation of committees inclusive of determining their respective jurisdictions
- Order of business
- Referral of bills, resolutions, speeches, committee reports, messages, memorials and petitions
- Rules of the House
- Rules of procedure governing inquires in aid of legislation
- Rules of procedure in impeachment proceedings

== Members, 20th Congress ==
As of June 30, 2025, all committee membership positions are vacant until the House convenes for its first regular session on July 28.

== Historical membership rosters ==
=== 18th Congress ===
Position	Members	Party	Province/City	District
Majority Leader	Ferdinand Martin Romualdez	Lakas	Leyte	1st
Senior Deputy Majority Leader	Jesus Crispin Remulla	Nacionalista	Cavite	7th
Deputy Majority Leaders	Juan Miguel Arroyo	Lakas	Pampanga	2nd
Deputy Majority Leaders	Lianda Bolilia	Nacionalista	Batangas	4th
Deputy Majority Leaders	Cristal Bagatsing	PDP–Laban	Manila	5th
Deputy Majority Leaders	Juan Pablo Bondoc	PDP–Laban	Pampanga	4th
Deputy Majority Leaders	Christopher De Venecia	Lakas	Pangasinan	4th
Deputy Majority Leaders	Marlyn Alonte-Naguiat	PDP–Laban	Biñan	Lone
Deputy Majority Leaders	Xavier Jesus Romualdo	PDP–Laban	Camiguin	Lone
Deputy Majority Leaders	Josephine Veronique Lacson-Noel	NPC	Malabon	Lone
Deputy Majority Leaders	Wilter Palma II	Lakas	Zamboanga Sibugay	1st
Deputy Majority Leaders	Ma. Theresa Collantes	PDP–Laban	Batangas	3rd
Deputy Majority Leaders	Ria Christina Fariñas	PDP–Laban	Ilocos Norte	1st
Deputy Majority Leaders	Camille Villar	Nacionalista	Las Piñas	Lone
Deputy Majority Leaders	Roger Mercado	Lakas	Southern Leyte	Lone
Deputy Majority Leaders	Tyrone Agabas	NPC	Pangasinan	6th
Assistant Majority Leaders	David Suarez	Nacionalista	Quezon	2nd
Assistant Majority Leaders	Julienne Baronda	NUP	Iloilo City	Lone
Assistant Majority Leaders	Claudine Diana Bautista	Dumper-PTDA	Party-list	
Assistant Majority Leaders	Precious Castelo	NPC	Quezon City	2nd
Assistant Majority Leaders	Juan Fidel Felipe Nograles	Lakas	Rizal	2nd
Assistant Majority Leaders	Manuel Zubiri	Bukidnon Paglaum	Bukidnon	3rd
Assistant Majority Leaders	Eduardo Gullas	Nacionalista	Cebu	1st
Assistant Majority Leaders	Michael Edgar Aglipay	DIWA	Party-list	
Assistant Majority Leaders	Rowena Niña Taduran	ACT-CIS	Party-list	
Assistant Majority Leaders	Anthony Peter Crisologo	NUP	Quezon City	1st
Assistant Majority Leaders	Alyssa Sheena Tan	PFP	Isabela	4th
Assistant Majority Leaders	Alfred Delos Santos	ANG PROBINSYANO	Party-list	
Assistant Majority Leaders	John Marvin Nieto	NUP	Manila	3rd
Assistant Majority Leaders	Amihilda Sangcopan	AMIN	Party-list	
Minority Leader	Joseph Stephen Paduano	Abang Lingkod	Party-list	
Senior Deputy Minority Leader	Janette Garin	Nacionalista	Iloilo	1st
Deputy Minority Leaders	Jose Christopher Belmonte	Liberal	Quezon City	6th
Deputy Minority Leaders	Carlos Isagani Zarate	Bayan Muna	Party-list	
Deputy Minority Leaders	Sharee Ann Tan	PDP–Laban	Samar	2nd
Deputy Minority Leaders	Stella Luz Quimbo	Liberal	Marikina	2nd
Deputy Minority Leaders	Bayani Fernando	NPC	Marikina	1st
Deputy Minority Leaders	Jose Singson Jr.	Probinsyano Ako	Party-list	
Assistant Minority Leaders	Sergio Dagooc	APEC	Party-list	
Assistant Minority Leaders	Argel Joseph Cabatbat	MAGSASAKA	Party-list	
Assistant Minority Leaders	Gabriel Bordado Jr.	Liberal	Camarines Sur	3rd
Assistant Minority Leaders	Irene Gay Saulog	KALINGA	Party-list	
Assistant Minority Leaders	Francisca Castro	ACT TEACHERS	Party-list	

==== Deputy Majority Leader ====
- Bernadette Herrera-Dy (BH)

==== Assistant Majority Leaders ====
- Marissa Andaya (Note: Died on July 5, 2020.) (Camarines Sur–1st, NPC)
- Kristine Singson-Meehan (Ilocos Sur–2nd, Bileg Party)

=== 19th Congress ===
Position	Members	Party	Province/City	District
Majority Leader	Manuel Jose Dalipe	Lakas	Zamboanga City	2nd
Senior Deputy Majority Leader	Ferdinand Alexander Marcos	Nacionalista	Ilocos Norte	1st
Deputy Majority Leaders	Josephine Veronique Lacson-Noel	NPC	Malabon	Lone
Deputy Majority Leaders	Marlyn Primicias-Agabas	PDP–Laban	Pangasinan	6th
Deputy Majority Leaders	Lianda Bolilia	PDP–Laban	Batangas	4th
Deputy Majority Leaders	Franz Pumaren	NUP	Quezon City	3rd
Deputy Majority Leaders	David C. Suarez	Lakas	Quezon	2nd
Assistant Majority Leaders	Anna Victoria Veloso-Tuazon	NUP	Leyte	3rd
Assistant Majority Leaders	Sancho Fernando Oaminal	Nacionalista	Misamis Occidental	2nd
Assistant Majority Leaders	Jaime Cojuangco	NPC	Tarlac	1st
Assistant Majority Leaders	Richard Gomez	PDP–Laban	Leyte	4th
Assistant Majority Leaders	Jude Acidre	Tingog	Party-list	
Assistant Majority Leaders	Patrick Michael Vargas	Lakas	Quezon City	5th
Minority Leader	Marcelino Libanan	4Ps	Party-list	
Senior Deputy Minority Leader	Paul Daza	NUP	Northern Samar	1st
Deputy Minority Leaders	Bernadette Herrera-Dy	BH	Party-list	
Deputy Minority Leaders	Presley de Jesus	PHILRECA	Party-list	
Deputy Minority Leaders	Mujiv Hataman	BUP	Basilan	Lone
Deputy Minority Leaders	France Castro	ACT Teachers	Party-list	
Deputy Minority Leaders	Stephen James Tan	Nacionalista	Samar	1st
Deputy Minority Leaders	Lex Anthony Cris Colada	AAMBIS-Owa	Party-list	
Deputy Minority Leaders	Florencio Noel	An Waray	Party-list	
Assistant Minority Leaders	Marissa Magsino	OFW	Party-list	
Assistant Minority Leaders	Harris Ongchuan	NUP	Northern Samar	2nd
Assistant Minority Leaders	Jonathan Clement Abalos II	4Ps	Party-list	
Assistant Minority Leaders	Nicolas Enciso VIII	Bicol Saro	Party-list	
Assistant Minority Leaders	Arlene Brosas	Gabriela	Party-list	
Assistant Minority Leaders	Sergio Dagooc	APEC	Party-list	
Assistant Minority Leaders	Reynolds Michael Tan	Nacionalista	Samar	2nd
Assistant Minority Leaders	Gabriel Bordado	Liberal	Camarines Sur	3rd

=== 20th Congress ===
Position	Members	Party	Province/City	District
Majority Leader	Ferdinand Alexander Marcos III	PFP	Ilocos Norte	1st
Senior Deputy Majority Leader	Lorenz Defensor	NUP	Iloilo	3rd
Deputy Majority Leaders	Julienne Baronda	Lakas	Iloilo City	Lone
Deputy Majority Leaders	Marlyn Primicias-Agabas	Lakas	Pangasinan	6th
Deputy Majority Leaders	Zia Alonto Adiong	Lakas	Lanao del Sur	1st
Deputy Majority Leaders	Patrick Michael Vargas	Lakas	Quezon City	5th
Deputy Majority Leaders	Ma. Alana Samantha Santos	Lakas	Cotabato	3rd
Deputy Majority Leaders	Ernesto Dionisio	NUP	Manila	1st
Deputy Majority Leaders	Jeyzel Victoria Yu	Lakas	Zamboanga del Sur	2nd
Deputy Majority Leaders	Arnan Panaligan	Lakas	Oriental Mindoro	1st
Deputy Majority Leaders	Alyssa Michaela Gonzales	Lakas	Pampanga	3rd
Deputy Majority Leaders	Marie Bernadette Escudero	NPC	Sorsogon	1st
Deputy Majority Leaders	Ivan Howard Guintu	Independent	Capiz	1st
Deputy Majority Leaders	Manuel Fortes Jr.	NPC	Sorsogon	2nd
Deputy Majority Leaders	Gil Acosta Jr.	Lakas	Palawan	3rd
Deputy Majority Leaders	Adrian Jay Advincula	NUP	Cavite	3rd
Deputy Majority Leaders	Anna Victoria Veloso-Tuazon	NUP	Leyte	3rd
Deputy Majority Leaders	Crispin Diego Remulla	NUP	Cavite	7th
Deputy Majority Leaders	Vincenzo Renato Luigi Villafuerte	NUP	Camarines Sur	2nd
Deputy Majority Leaders	Jose Teves Jr.	TGP	Party-list	
Deputy Majority Leaders	Munir Arbison Jr.	KAPUSO PM	Party-list	
Deputy Majority Leaders	Ramon Rodrigo Gutierrez	1-Rider	Party-list	
Assistant Majority Leaders	Sittie Shahara I. Mastura	Lakas	Maguindanao del Norte	Lone
Assistant Majority Leaders	Rhea Gullas	Lakas	Cebu	1st
Assistant Majority Leaders	Roberto T. Uy Jr.	Lakas	Zamboanga del Norte	1st
Assistant Majority Leaders	Agatha Paula Cruz	PFP	Bulacan	5th
Assistant Majority Leaders	Oyo Uy	Lakas	Davao del Norte	1st District
Assistant Majority Leaders	Jhong Ceniza	Lakas	Davao de Oro	2nd
Assistant Majority Leaders	Ronald Singson	NPC	Ilocos Sur	1st
Assistant Majority Leaders	Mark Anthony Santos	NPC	Las Piñas	Lone
Assistant Majority Leaders	King Collantes	NPC	Batangas	3rd
Assistant Majority Leaders	Patricia Calderon	NPC	Cebu	7th
Assistant Majority Leaders	Arjo Atayde	NUP	Quezon City	1st
Assistant Majority Leaders	Alexandria Gonzales	NUP	Mandaluyong	Lone
Assistant Majority Leaders	John Geesnell Yap	LDP	Bohol	1st
Assistant Majority Leaders	Esmael Mangudadatu	PFP	Maguindanao del Sur	Lone
Assistant Majority Leaders	Bella Suansing	PFP	Sultan Kudarat	2nd
Assistant Majority Leaders	Javi Benitez	PFP	Negros Occidental	3rd
Assistant Majority Leaders	Katrina Reiko Chua-Tai	PFP	Zamboanga City	1st
Assistant Majority Leaders	Daniel Bocobo	Nacionalista	Taguig	2nd
Assistant Majority Leaders	Ryan Recto	Nacionalista	Batangas	6th
Assistant Majority Leaders	Brian Poe Llamanzares	FPJ Panday Bayanihan	Party-list	
Assistant Majority Leaders	Johanne Monich Baustista	TRABAHO	Party-list	
Assistant Majority Leaders	Antonino Roman III	Lakas	Bataan	1st
Assistant Majority Leaders	Ricardo Cruz	Nacionalista	Taguig-Pateros	1st
Minority Leader	Marcelino Libanan	4Ps	Party-list	
Senior Deputy Minority Leader	Edgar Erice	Liberal	Caloocan	2nd
Deputy Minority Leaders	Leila de Lima	ML	Party-list	
Deputy Minority Leaders	Presley de Jesus	PHILRECA	Party-list	
Deputy Minority Leaders	Sergio Dagooc	APEC	Party-list	
Deputy Minority Leaders	Kaka Bag-ao	Liberal	Dinagat Islands	Lone
Deputy Minority Leaders	Stephen James Tan	Nacionalista	Samar	1st
Deputy Minority Leaders	Perci Cendaña	Akbayan	Party-list	
Deputy Minority Leaders	Antonio Tinio	ACT Teachers	Party-list	
Deputy Minority Leaders	Bong Suntay	UNA	Quezon City	4th
Deputy Minority Leaders	Jernie Jett Nisay	Pusong Pinoy	Party-list	
Deputy Minority Leaders	Reynolds Michael Tan	Lakas	Samar	2nd
Deputy Minority Leaders	Krisel Lagman	Liberal	Albay	1st
Assistant Minority Leaders	Sheen Gonzales	NUP	Eastern Samar	Lone
Assistant Minority Leaders	Renee Co	Kabataan	Party-list	
Assistant Minority Leaders	Chel Diokno	Akbayan	Party-list	
Assistant Minority Leaders	Roberto Nazal Jr.	BH	Party-list	
Assistant Minority Leaders	Niko Raul Daza	NUP	Northern Samar	1st
Assistant Minority Leaders	Audrey Zubiri	PFP	Bukidnon	3rd
Assistant Minority Leaders	Iris Marie Montes	4K	Party-list	
