= Philippine House Committee on the Welfare of Children =

Standing committee of the House of Representatives of the Philippines

Committee on the Welfare of Children
- 20th Congress

History
- New session started: To convene on July 28, 2025

Leadership
- Chairman: Vacant
- Minority Leader: Vacant

Website
- Committee on the Welfare of Children

The Philippine House Committee on the Welfare of Children, or House Welfare of Children Committee is a standing committee of the Philippine House of Representatives.

== Jurisdiction ==
As prescribed by House Rules, the committee's jurisdiction includes the following:

- All actions to ensure the availability of and continuing access of Filipino children to affordable and appropriate programs and resources that facilitate and contribute to the attainment of their welfare
- Needs, education and overall welfare of Filipino children

== Members, 20th Congress ==
As of June 30, 2025, all committee membership positions are vacant until the House convenes for its first regular session on July 28.

== Historical membership rosters ==
=== 18th Congress ===
Position	Members	Party	Province/City	District
Chairperson	Yedda Marie Romualdez	Tingog Sinirangan	Party-list	
Vice Chairpersons	Josefina Tallado	PDP–Laban	Camarines Norte	1st
Vice Chairpersons	Paz Radaza	Lakas	Lapu-Lapu City	Lone
Vice Chairpersons	Michael Defensor	ANAKALUSUGAN	Party-list	
Vice Chairpersons	Anna Marie Villaraza-Suarez	ALONA	Party-list	
Vice Chairpersons	Ma. Lourdes Acosta-Alba	Bukidnon Paglaum	Bukidnon	1st
Members for the Majority	Rosanna Vergara	PDP–Laban	Nueva Ecija	3rd
Members for the Majority	Kristine Alexie Tutor	Nacionalista	Bohol	3rd
Members for the Majority	Resurreccion Acop	NUP	Antipolo	2nd
Members for the Majority	Ma. Fe Abunda	PDP–Laban	Eastern Samar	Lone
Members for the Majority	Ma. Lourdes Arroyo	Lakas	Negros Occidental	5th
Members for the Majority	Naealla Rose Bainto-Aguinaldo	BAHAY	Party-list	
Members for the Majority	Raymond Democrito Mendoza	TUCP	Party-list	
Members for the Majority	Manuel Jose Dalipe	NPC	Zamboanga City	2nd
Members for the Majority	Joy Myra Tambunting	NUP	Parañaque	2nd
Members for the Majority	Diego Ty	NUP	Misamis Occidental	1st
Members for the Majority	Janice Salimbangon	NUP	Cebu	4th
Members for the Majority	Ruth Mariano-Hernandez	Independent	Laguna	2nd
Members for the Minority	Irene Gay Saulog	KALINGA	Party-list	
Members for the Minority	Arlene Brosas	GABRIELA	Party-list	

== See also ==
- House of Representatives of the Philippines
- List of Philippine House of Representatives committees
