= General Appropriations Act of 2025 =

Philippine law

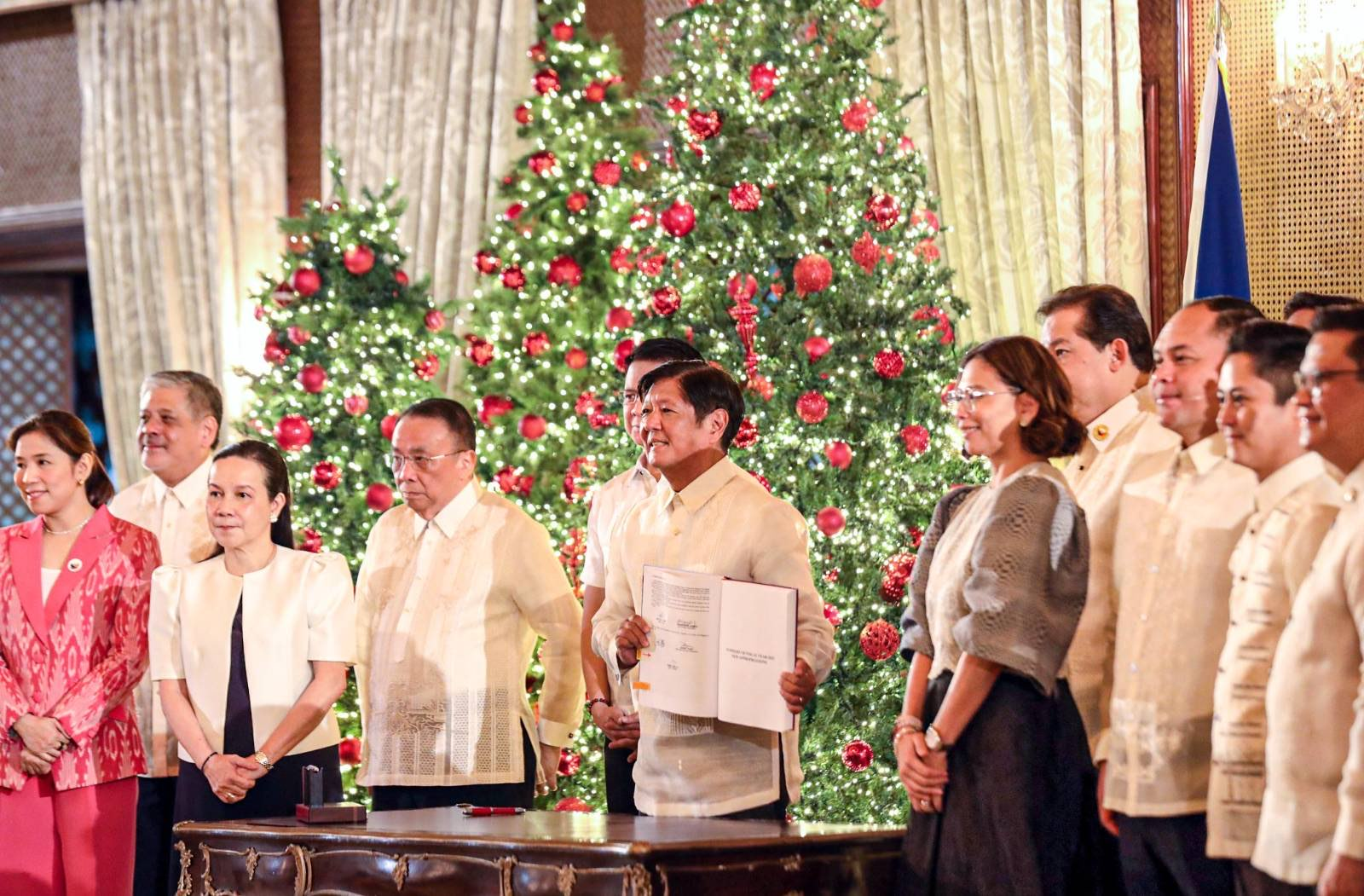

House of Representatives
- Long title: An Act appropriating funds for the operation of the government of the Republic of the Philippines from January one to December thirty one, two thousand and twenty five
- Citation: Republic Act No. 12116
- Territorial extent: Philippines
- Enacted by: House of Representatives
- Enacted: September 25, 2024
- Enacted by: Senate
- Enacted: November 26, 2024
- Signed by: President Bongbong Marcos
- Signed: December 30, 2024

Legislative history

Initiating chamber: House of Representatives
- Bill title: Same title as final law
- Committee responsible: Appropriations
- Voting summary: 285 voted for; 3 voted against

Revising chamber: Senate
- Received from the House of Representatives: October 24, 2024
- Member(s) in charge: Grace Poe
- Committee responsible: Finance
- Voting summary: 18 voted for; None voted against; 1 abstained

Final stages
- Reported from conference committee: December 11, 2024
- Voting summary: 15 voted for; 2 voted against

Struck down by
- G.R. No. E-02472
- Status: Struck down

General Appropriations Act of 2025 published copy

The General Appropriations Act of 2025, officially designated as Republic Act No. 12116, is a Philippine law that provides the national budget for the year 2025. Signed into law by President Bongbong Marcos on December 30, 2024, its provisions include ₱1 trillion funding for both the Department of Education (DepEd) and the Department of Public Works and Highways (DPWH), the removal of all government subsidies for PhilHealth amounting to ₱74 billion, and a ₱50 billion reduction to the poverty alleviation program 4Ps. The act has been criticized for its potentially unconstitutional provisions, with economist Cielo Magno deeming the initial ratified bill to be "the most corrupt budget in history".

Several members of the bicameral conference committee did not sign the bicameral report, while two senators, Risa Hontiveros and Koko Pimentel, voted against the ratification of the budget bill. In response to the criticism, President Marcos made line-item vetoes to provisions related to flood control projects (amounting to ₱16.7 billion) prior to signing the bill.

The Supreme Court declared unconstitutional the General Appropriations Act of 2025 due to an increase in the Special Road Fund of the Department of Public Works and Highways (DPWH) by P17.99 billion on October 20, 2026.

== Legislative history ==
=== Submission of the NEP to the House of Representatives ===
On July 29, 2024, the Department of Budget and Management submitted its proposed ₱6.352 trillion National Expenditure Program (NEP) for fiscal year 2025, previously signed by President Bongbong Marcos, to the House of Representatives.

=== House Appropriations Committee ===
==== Small Committee ====
Members of the Small Committee
Position	Member	Constituency	Party
Chairperson	Zaldy Co	Partylist	Ako Bicol
Senior Vice Chairperson	Stella Quimbo	Marikina–2nd	Lakas
Majority Leader	Mannix Dalipe	Zamboanga City–2nd	Lakas
Minority Leader	Marcelino "Nonoy" Libanan	Partylist	4Ps

=== Bicameral conference committee ===
Conferees of the Bicameral Conference Committee
House	Party	Senate	Party
Zaldy Co	Ako Bicol	Grace Poe	Independent
Jude Acidre	Tingog	Pia Cayetano	Nacionalista
Romeo Acop	NUP	Ronald Dela Rosa	PDP
Jose "Joboy" Aquino II	Lakas	JV Ejercito	NPC
Jil Bongalon	Ako Bicol	Francis Escudero	NPC
Mannix Dalipe	Lakas	Jinggoy Estrada	PMP
Jack Duavit	NPC	Win Gatchalian	NPC
Neptali Gonzales II	NUP	Bong Go	PDP
Aurelio "Dong" Gonzales Jr.	Lakas	Risa Hontiveros	Akbayan
Marcelino "Nonoy" Libanan	4Ps	Loren Legarda	NPC
Eleandro "Budoy" Madrona	Nacionalista	Imee Marcos	Nacionalista
Stella Quimbo	Lakas	Koko Pimentel	Nacionalista
David "Jay-Jay" Suarez	Lakas	Francis Tolentino	PFP
		Joel Villanueva	Independent
		Cynthia Villar	Nacionalista
		Mark Villar	Nacionalista
		Juan Miguel Zubiri	Independent
