= List of barangays in Zamboanga City =

Zamboanga City, a highly urbanized city since 22 November 1983, comprises 98 barangays, which are grouped into 13 geographic districts. The territory of Zamboanga City covers approximately 148,338.40 hectares, of which 142,089.90 (95.8%) lies on mainland Mindanao and 6,248.50 (4.2%) are on islands.

In 2005, 30 barangays were classified as urban, while the remaining 68 were rural. However, due to rapid urbanization, there are now 58 urban barangays where 746,315 (86.6%) of Zamboanga City's population lives. The remaining 40 rural barangays are home to 115,484 residents, representing 13.4% of the total population.

The city is divided into two legislative districts, roughly corresponding to west (1st District) and east (2nd District) coasts, for the purposes of electing members to the House of Representatives of the Philippines and the Sangguniang Panlungsod. The 1st District encompasses the geographic districts of Ayala, Baliwasan, Labuan, Santa Maria, Zamboanga Central and the southern part of Santa Barbara; the 2nd District covers the rest of the geographic district of Santa Barbara, along with Curuan, Manicahan, Mercedes, Putik, Tetuan, Vitali and the Island Barangays.

== List of barangays ==
Barangays of Zamboanga City
Administration				Population			PSGC Code and Class	
Barangay	Geographic District	Legislative District	Area (ha)	2024	2020	Change	Code	Urban/Rural
Arena Blanco	Tetuan	II	51.5717	13,848	13,671	+1.29%	97332001	Urban
Ayala	Ayala	I	529.1303	27,119	26,658	+1.73%	97332002	Urban
Baliwasan	Baliwasan	I	126.5476	19,806	17,932	+10.45%	97332004	Urban
Baluno	Ayala	I	1,643.4602	4,060	3,865	+5.05%	97332005	Rural
Boalan	Putik	II	865.561	11,849	11,541	+2.67%	97332010	Urban
Bolong	Manicahan	II	1,574.0594	8,041	8,608	−6.59%	97332011	Urban
Buenavista	Curuan	II	1,003.5189	8,508	8,154	+4.34%	97332012	Urban
Bunguiao	Manicahan	II	2,562.0727	8,585	7,952	+7.96%	97332013	Urban
Busay (Sacol Island)	Island Barangays	II	436.3663	2,172	2,290	−5.15%	97332014	Rural
Cabaluay	Mercedes	II	872.2986	8,868	8,849	+0.21%	97332015	Urban
Cabatangan	Santa Maria	I	896.6494	18,402	17,812	+3.31%	97332016	Urban
Cacao	Mercedes	II	1,194.4581	1,555	1,311	+18.61%	97332017	Rural
Calabasa	Curuan	II	1,849.9353	3,251	2,936	+10.73%	97332018	Rural
Calarian	Baliwasan	I	253.8887	37,263	33,563	+11.02%	97332019	Urban
Camino Nuevo	Zamboanga Central	I	68.6803	7,554	7,421	+1.79%	97332099	Urban
Campo Islam	Baliwasan	I	26.2606	11,906	11,730	+1.50%	97332020	Urban
Canelar	Zamboanga Central	I	92.7185	10,467	10,512	−0.43%	97332021	Urban
Capisan	Baliwasan	I	490.5677	1,504	1,488	+1.08%	97332098	Rural
Cawit	Ayala	I	378.0762	10,355	10,244	+1.08%	97332022	Urban
Culianan	Mercedes	II	900.5328	11,339	10,851	+4.50%	97332023	Urban
Curuan	Curuan	II	7,216.0695	12,017	11,954	+0.53%	97332024	Urban
Dita	Curuan	II	133.7222	2,240	2,028	+10.45%	97332025	Rural
Divisoria	Putik	II	286.2707	13,375	13,172	+1.54%	97332026	Urban
Dulian (Upper Bunguiao)	Curuan	II	1,542.3299	2,664	2,569	+3.70%	97332027	Rural
Dulian (Upper Pasonanca)	Santa Maria	I	679.6396	1,754	1,489	+17.80%	97332028	Rural
Guisao	Mercedes	II	567.3387	2,914	2,583	+12.81%	97332030	Rural
Guiwan	Tetuan	II	178.0205	13,579	13,231	+2.63%	97332031	Urban
Kasanyangan	Santa Barbara	II		29,697	28,819	+3.05%	97332101	Urban
La Paz	Labuan	I	1,740.0822	7,864	8,724	−9.86%	97332032	Urban
Labuan	Labuan	I	1,961.7203	15,683	16,095	−2.56%	97332033	Urban
Lamisahan	Manicahan	II	2,125.8888	3,111	2,764	+12.55%	97332034	Rural
Landang Gua	Island Barangays	II	589.8559	3,075	3,154	−2.50%	97332035	Rural
Landang Laum	Island Barangays	II	268.547	3,106	3,095	+0.36%	97332036	Rural
Lanzones	Mercedes	II	953.1401	3,314	3,689	−10.17%	97332037	Rural
Lapakan	Mercedes	II	955.383	1,940	1,868	+3.85%	97332038	Rural
Latuan (Curuan)	Curuan	II	98.0766	2,804	2,615	+7.23%	97332039	Rural
Licomo	Vitali	II	1,707.8995	5,956	5,388	+10.54%	97332100	Urban
Limaong	Vitali	II	1,853.7832	4,796	4,766	+0.63%	97332040	Rural
Limpapa	Labuan	I	696.3089	7,753	6,060	+27.94%	97332041	Urban
Lubigan	Curuan	II	1,416.7021	3,541	3,249	+8.99%	97332042	Rural
Lumayang	Putik	II	790.0515	1,914	1,999	−4.25%	97332043	Rural
Lumbangan	Putik	II	440.1625	5,377	4,461	+20.53%	97332044	Rural
Lunzuran	Putik	II	742.5246	15,251	13,232	+15.26%	97332045	Urban
Maasin	Ayala	I	556.426	11,221	9,267	+21.09%	97332046	Urban
Malagutay	Baliwasan	I	627.8804	8,341	8,265	+0.92%	97332047	Urban
Mampang	Tetuan	II	726.0937	31,302	31,975	−2.10%	97332048	Urban
Manalipa	Island Barangays	II	288.4444	2,882	2,588	+11.36%	97332049	Rural
Mangusu	Vitali	II	828.1945	5,615	5,608	+0.12%	97332050	Rural
Manicahan	Manicahan	II	1,801.7465	12,647	11,999	+5.40%	97332051	Urban
Mariki	Santa Barbara	I	0.3085	6,780	6,310	+7.45%	97332052	Urban
Mercedes	Mercedes	II	1,288.5634	24,302	22,321	+8.88%	97332053	Urban
Muti	Curuan	II	1,233.2268	3,547	3,420	+3.71%	97332054	Rural
Pamucutan	Labuan	I	563.1417	4,756	4,404	+7.99%	97332055	Rural
Pangapuyan	Island Barangays	II	9.2339	837	767	+9.13%	97332056	Rural
Panubigan	Curuan	II	431.0032	1,824	982	+85.74%	97332057	Rural
Pasilmanta (Sacol Island)	Island Barangays	II	664.1481	3,314	3,138	+5.61%	97332058	Rural
Pasobolong	Putik	II		5,997	5,624	+6.63%	97332102	Rural
Pasonanca	Santa Maria	I	1,146.665	30,369	27,215	+11.59%	97332059	Urban
Patalon	Labuan	I	1,400.8893	11,899	11,127	+6.94%	97332060	Urban
Putik	Putik	II	279.215	22,296	22,271	+0.11%	97332065	Urban
Quiniput	Curuan	II	1,031.6762	3,929	4,015	−2.14%	97332066	Rural
Recodo	Ayala	I	176.6764	23,812	23,254	+2.40%	97332067	Urban
Rio Hondo	Santa Barbara	I	180.372	8,892	8,827	+0.74%	97332068	Urban
Salaan	Putik	II	1,698.946	4,691	3,623	+29.48%	97332069	Rural
San Jose Cawa-Cawa	Baliwasan	I	36.2309	3,497	4,292	−18.52%	97332070	Urban
San Jose Gusu	Baliwasan	I	154.6178	16,379	16,260	+0.73%	97332071	Urban
San Ramon	Talisayan	I	36.2309	15,463	11,428	+35.31%	97237030	Urban
San Roque	Santa Maria	I	406.6463	29,190	28,829	+1.25%	97332072	Urban
Sangali	Manicahan	II	1,259.3212	28,440	26,758	+6.29%	97332073	Urban
Santa Barbara	Santa Barbara	I	14.7966	7,090	6,711	+5.65%	97332074	Urban
Santa Catalina	Santa Barbara	II	54.2083	16,656	16,664	−0.05%	97332075	Urban
Santa Maria	Santa Maria	I	355.8146	25,041	24,133	+3.76%	97332076	Urban
Santo Niño	Baliwasan	I	25.0831	4,133	3,888	+6.30%	97332077	Urban
Sibulao (Caruan)	Vitali	II	1,148.7588	4,315	4,167	+3.55%	97332078	Rural
Sinubung	Labuan	I	905.1368	3,965	3,601	+10.11%	97332079	Rural
Sinunoc	Ayala	I	852.8397	23,568	22,918	+2.84%	97332080	Urban
Tagasilay	Vitali	II	1,616.5975	4,159	3,998	+4.03%	97332081	Rural
Taguiti	Vitali	II	1,377.338	1,546	1,328	+16.42%	97332082	Rural
Talabaan	Mercedes	II	891.854	6,050	5,907	+2.42%	97332083	Rural
Talisayan	Ayala	I	3,498.2387	15,463	11,428	+35.31%	97332084	Urban
Talon-Talon	Tetuan	II	591.8379	38,108	37,530	+1.54%	97332085	Urban
Taluksangay	Mercedes	II	25.0707	9,455	9,437	+0.19%	97332086	Urban
Tetuan	Tetuan	II	304.2304	29,831	29,621	+0.71%	97332087	Urban
Tictapul	Vitali	II	202.7718	3,639	3,527	+3.18%	97332088	Rural
Tigbalabag	Vitali	II	1,357.9765	2,420	2,109	+14.75%	97332089	Rural
Tigtabon	Island Barangays	II	22.1714	6,266	5,365	+16.79%	97332090	Urban
Tolosa	Mercedes	II	551.3498	3,971	3,859	+2.90%	97332091	Rural
Tugbungan	Tetuan	II	380.7098	27,301	26,538	+2.88%	97332092	Urban
Tulungatung	Ayala	I	278.0743	13,321	11,741	+13.46%	97332093	Urban
Tumaga	Santa Maria	I	273.9979	33,320	33,399	−0.24%	97332094	Urban
Tumalutab	Island Barangays	II	76.393	3,416	3,436	−0.58%	97332095	Rural
Tumitus	Vitali	II	1,786.5	2,979	2,731	+9.08%	97332096	Rural
Victoria	Manicahan	II		3,933	3,393	+15.92%	97332103	Rural
Vitali	Vitali	II	5,409.2099	11,118	10,716	+3.75%	97332097	Urban
Zambowood	Putik	II		13,035	12,870	+1.28%	97332104	Urban
Zone I (Poblacion)	Zamboanga Central	I	14.7966	4,962	4,806	+3.25%	97332061	Urban
Zone II (Poblacion)	Zamboanga Central	I	12.9338	1,548	1,802	−14.10%	97332062	Urban
Zone III (Poblacion)	Zamboanga Central	I	29.0295	1,123	1,146	−2.01%	97332063	Urban
Zone IV (Poblacion)	Zamboanga Central	I	27.1036	691	1,174	−41.14%	97332064	Urban
Zamboanga City			81,634.3618	1,018,849	977,234			
Source: Philippine Statistics Authority - Philippine Standard Geographic Code - Zamboanga City - Barangays
