= Philippine House Committee on National Defense and Security =

Standing committee of the House of Representatives of the Philippines

Committee on National Defense and Security
- 20th Congress

History
- New session started: To convene on July 28, 2025

Leadership
- Chairman: Vacant
- Minority Leader: Vacant

Website
- Committee on National Defense and Security

The Philippine House Committee on National Defense and Security, or House National Defense and Security Committee is a standing committee of the Philippine House of Representatives.

== Jurisdiction ==
As prescribed by House Rules, the committee's jurisdiction includes the following:

- Armed Forces of the Philippines
- Citizens army
- Coast
- Forts and arsenals
- Geodetic surveys
- Military bases
- National defense and national security
- Reservations and yards
- Selective services

== Members, 20th Congress ==
As of June 30, 2025, all committee membership positions are vacant until the House convenes for its first regular session on July 28.

== Historical membership rosters ==
=== 18th Congress ===
Position	Members	Party	Province/City	District
Chairperson	Raul Tupas	Nacionalista	Iloilo	5th
Vice Chairpersons	Rozzano Rufino Biazon	PDP–Laban	Muntinlupa	Lone
Vice Chairpersons	Antonino Calixto	PDP–Laban	Pasay	Lone
Vice Chairpersons	Jorge Antonio Bustos	PATROL	Party-list	
Vice Chairpersons	Esmael Mangudadatu	PDP–Laban	Maguindanao	2nd
Vice Chairpersons	Adolph Edward Plaza	NUP	Agusan del Sur	2nd
Vice Chairpersons	Rogelio Neil Roque	Nacionalista	Bukidnon	4th
Vice Chairpersons	Joseph Sto. Niño Bernos	Nacionalista	Abra	Lone
Members for the Majority	Rudy Caoagdan	PDP–Laban	Cotabato	2nd
Members for the Majority	Jonathan Keith Flores	PDP–Laban	Bukidnon	2nd
Members for the Majority	Rolando Uy	NUP	Cagayan de Oro	1st
Members for the Majority	Samier Tan	PDP–Laban	Sulu	1st
Members for the Majority	Arnulf Bryan Fuentebella	NPC	Camarines Sur	4th
Members for the Majority	Erico Aristotle Aumentado	NPC	Bohol	2nd
Members for the Majority	Ciriaco Gato Jr.	NPC	Batanes	Lone
Members for the Majority	Michael John Duavit	NPC	Rizal	1st
Members for the Majority	John Reynald Tiangco	Partido Navoteño	Navotas	Lone
Members for the Majority	Manuel Jose Dalipe	NPC	Zamboanga City	2nd
Members for the Majority	Genaro Alvarez Jr.	NPC	Negros Occidental	6th
Members for the Majority	Dahlia Loyola	NPC	Cavite	5th
Members for the Majority	Gil Acosta	PPP	Palawan	3rd
Members for the Majority	Vicente Veloso III	NUP	Leyte	3rd
Members for the Majority	Narciso Bravo Jr.	NUP	Masbate	1st
Members for the Majority	Cyrille Abueg-Zaldivar	PPP	Palawan	2nd
Members for the Majority	Michael Gorriceta	Nacionalista	Iloilo	2nd
Members for the Majority	Jose Tejada	Nacionalista	Cotabato	3rd
Members for the Majority	Frederick Siao	Nacionalista	Iligan	Lone
Members for the Majority	Gerardo Espina Jr.	Lakas	Biliran	Lone
Members for the Majority	Henry Villarica	PDP–Laban	Bulacan	4th
Members for the Majority	Horacio Suansing Jr.	NUP	Sultan Kudarat	2nd
Members for the Majority	Hector Sanchez	Lakas	Catanduanes	Lone
Members for the Majority	Manuel Cabochan	MAGDALO	Party-list	
Members for the Majority	Presley De Jesus	PHILRECA	Party-list	
Members for the Majority	Adriano Ebcas	AKO PADAYON	Party-list	
Members for the Majority	Alberto Pacquiao	OFWFC	Party-list	
Members for the Majority	Arnold Celeste	Nacionalista	Pangasinan	1st
Members for the Majority	Aloysia Lim	RAM	Party-list	
Members for the Majority	Cesar Jimenez Jr.	PDP–Laban	Zamboanga City	1st
Members for the Minority	Argel Joseph Cabatbat	MAGSASAKA	Party-list	
Members for the Minority	Alex Advincula	NUP	Cavite	3rd
Members for the Minority	Janette Garin	Nacionalista	Iloilo	1st
Members for the Minority	Irene Gay Saulog	KALINGA	Party-list	
Members for the Minority	Angelica Natasha Co	BHW	Party-list	

==== Vice chairperson ====
- Francisco Datol Jr. (Note: Died on August 10, 2020.) (Senior Citizens)

== See also ==
- House of Representatives of the Philippines
- List of Philippine House of Representatives committees
- Department of National Defense
- Armed Forces of the Philippines
