= Zamboanga City's at-large congressional district =

Legislative district of the Philippines

Zamboanga City's at-large congressional district is an obsolete congressional district of the Philippines that encompassed the entire Zamboanga City prior to its 2004 reapportionment that took effect in 2007. It existed from 1984 to 2007, when Zamboanga elected a representative city-wide at-large to the Batasang Pambansa and to the restored House of Representatives. Before 1984 when it was granted its own seat in the regular Batasan assembly as a highly-urbanized city, Zamboanga was represented as part of the multi-member Region IX's at-large assembly district for the Interim Batasang Pambansa and was also earlier included in Zamboanga del Sur's at-large congressional district for the Third Philippine Republic congresses. It was last represented by Erico Basilio Fabian of the Laban ng Demokratikong Pilipino (LDP).

== Representation history ==
#	Image	Member	Term of office		Batasang Pambansa	Party	Electoral history
#	Image	Member	Start	End	Batasang Pambansa	Party	Electoral history
=== Zamboanga City's at-large district for the Regular Batasang Pambansa ===
District created February 1, 1984 from Region IX's at-large district.
1		Cesar Climaco	–	–	2nd	UNIDO (CCA)	Elected in 1984. Did not formally assume office due to term as Zamboanga City mayor. Died November 14, 1984.
#	Image	Member	Term of office		Congress	Party	Electoral history
#	Image	Member	Start	End	Congress	Party	Electoral history
=== Zamboanga City's at-large district for the House of Representatives of the Philippines ===
District re-created February 2, 1987.
2		Maria Clara Lobregat	June 30, 1987	June 30, 1998	8th	Independent	Elected in 1987.
2		Maria Clara Lobregat	June 30, 1987	June 30, 1998	9th	LDP	Re-elected in 1992.
2		Maria Clara Lobregat	June 30, 1987	June 30, 1998	10th	LDP	Re-elected in 1995.
3		Celso Lobregat	June 30, 1998	June 30, 2004	11th	LDP	Elected in 1998.
3		Celso Lobregat	June 30, 1998	June 30, 2004	12th	LDP	Re-elected in 2001.
4		Erico Basilio Fabian	June 30, 2004	June 30, 2007	13th	LDP	Elected in 2004. Redistricted to the 2nd district.
District dissolved into Zamboanga City's 1st and 2nd districts.

== See also ==
- Legislative districts of Zamboanga City
