= Zamboanga City's 2nd congressional district =

Legislative district of the Philippines

- Constituency for the House of Representatives of the Philippines
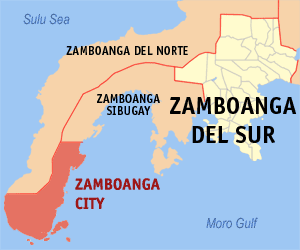
- Location of Zamboanga City within the Zamboanga Peninsula
- City: Zamboanga City
- Region: Zamboanga Peninsula
- Population: 459,205 (2015)
- Electorate: 258,742 (2025)
- Major settlements: 60 barangays: Barangays; Arena Blanco; Boalan; Bolong; Buenavista; Bunguiao; Busay; Cabaluay; Cacao; Calabasa; Culianan; Curuan; Dita; Divisoria; Dulian (Upper Bunguiao); Guisao; Guiwan; Kasanyangan; Lamisahan; Landang Gua; Landang Laum; Lanzones; Lapakan; Latuan; Licomo; Limaong; Lubigan; Lumayang; Lumbangan; Lunzuran; Mampang; Manalipa; Mangusu; Manicahan; Mercedes; Muti; Pangapuyan; Panubigan; Pasilmanta; Pasobolong; Putik; Quiniput; Salaan; Sangali; Santa Catalina; Sibulao; Tagasilay; Taguiti; Talabaan; Talon-Talon; Taluksangay; Tetuan; Tictapul; Tigbalabag; Tictabon; Tolosa; Tugbungan; Tumalutap; Tumitus; Victoria; Vitali; Zambowood
- Area: 1,203.49 km^{2} (464.67 sq mi)

Current constituency
- Created: 2004
- Representative: Jerry E. Perez
- Political party: NUP; AZAP
- Congressional bloc: Majority

Zamboanga City's 2nd congressional district is one of the two congressional districts of the Philippines in Zamboanga City. It has been represented in the House of Representatives since 2007. It was created by the 2004 reapportionment that divided the city into two congressional districts and which took effect in 2007. The district is composed of 60 barangays in the city's east coast and includes Sacol and Vitali islands, as well as parts of its downtown commercial area east of Veterans Avenue. It is currently represented in the 20th Congress by Jerry E. Perez of the National Unity Party (NUP) and Adelante Zamboanga Party (AZAP).

== Representation history ==
#	Image	Member	Term of office		Congress	Party	Electoral history	Constituent LGUs
#	Image	Member	Start	End	Congress	Party	Electoral history	Constituent LGUs
=== Zamboanga City's 2nd district for the House of Representatives of the Philippines ===
District created March 19, 2004.
1		Erico Basilio Fabian	June 30, 2007	June 30, 2013	14th	Nacionalista	Redistricted from the at-large district and re-elected in 2007.	2007–present Arena Blanco, Boalan, Bolong, Buenavista, Bunguiao, Busay, Cabaluay, Cacao, Calabasa, Culianan, Curuan, Dita, Divisoria, Dulian (Upper Bunguiao), Guisao, Guiwan, Kasanyangan, Lamisahan, Landang Gua, Landang Laum, Lanzones, Lapakan, Latuan, Licomo, Limaong, Lubigan, Lumayang, Lumbangan, Lunzuran, Mampang, Manalipa, Mangusu, Manicahan, Mercedes, Muti, Pangapuyan, Panubigan, Pasilmanta, Pasobolong, Putik, Quiniput, Salaan, Sangali, Santa Catalina, Sibulao, Tagasilay, Taguiti, Talabaan, Talon-Talon, Taluksangay, Tetuan, Tictapul, Tigbalabag, Tictabon, Tolosa, Tugbungan, Tumalutap, Tumitus, Victoria, Vitali, Zambowood
1		Erico Basilio Fabian	June 30, 2007	June 30, 2013	15th	Nacionalista	Re-elected in 2010.	
2		Lilia Macrohon Nuño	June 30, 2013	June 30, 2016	16th	Nacionalista	Elected in 2013.	
3		Manuel Jose "Mannix" Dalipe	June 30, 2016	June 30, 2025	17th	NPC	Elected in 2016.	
3		Manuel Jose "Mannix" Dalipe	June 30, 2016	June 30, 2025	18th	NPC	Re-elected in 2019.	
3		Manuel Jose "Mannix" Dalipe	June 30, 2016	June 30, 2025	19th	Lakas	Re-elected in 2022.	
4		Jerry Perez	June 30, 2025	Incumbent	20th	NUP (AZAP)	Elected in 2025.	

== Election results ==
=== 2025 ===
Candidate	Party	Votes	%
Jerry Perez	Adelante Zamboanga Party	100,035	53.93
John Dalipe	Lakas–CMD	66,763	35.99
Michelle Natividad	Partido Demokratiko Pilipino	15,639	8.43
Darlene Sali	Independent	1,594	0.86
Ander Ismael	Independent	1,473	0.79
Total		185,504	100.00
Valid votes		185,504	92.06
Invalid/blank votes		16,003	7.94
Total votes		201,507	100.00
Registered voters/turnout		258,742	77.88
Adelante Zamboanga Party gain from Lakas–CMD			
Source: Commission on Elections

=== 2022 ===
Candidate	Party	Votes	%
Mannix Dalipe (incumbent)	Lakas–CMD	88,784	53.99
Jerry Perez	Laban ng Demokratikong Pilipino	58,461	35.55
Kim Elago	Partido Prosperidad y Amor Para na Zamboanga	11,304	6.87
Mohammad Sali Ammang	Independent	4,526	2.75
Fictal Majuddin	Independent	1,382	0.84
Total		164,457	100.00
Total votes		180,227	–
Registered voters/turnout		230,964	78.03
Lakas–CMD hold			
Source: Commission on Elections

== See also ==
- Legislative districts of Zamboanga City
