= Trifonio Salazar =

Filipino general (1948–2023)

Trifonio Peñaflorida Salazar (October 18, 1948 – January 14, 2023) was a Major General in the Armed Forces of the Philippines. He was Commander of the 1st Infantry "Tabak" Division based in Jolo, Sulu from 2004 to 2006. He was in July 2010 named as the new chief of the Philippine National Intelligence Coordinating Agency. He was the husband of then Zamboanga City Mayor Maria Isabelle "Beng" Climaco.
