= Irene Gay Saulog =

Filipino politician

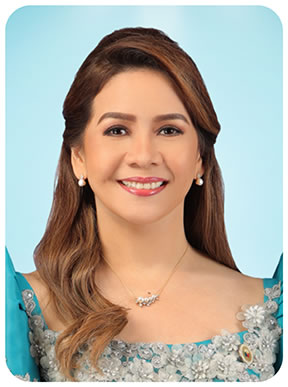

Member of the House of Representatives of the Philippines for Kalinga
- In office June 30, 2019 – June 30, 2025

Personal details
- Born: September 1, 1975 (age 50) Marikina, Rizal, Philippines

Irene Gay "Khate" Ferriol Saulog is a Filipino politician who is a member of the House of Representatives.

== See also ==
- 18th Congress of the Philippines
- 19th Congress of the Philippines
