= Erbie Fabian =

Filipino politician (born 1957)

Erico Basilio Fabian
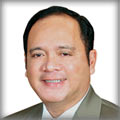
- Official portrait, 2010

19th Mayor of Zamboanga City
- In office January 2, 2004 – June 30, 2004
- Vice Mayor: Maria Isabelle Climaco
- Preceded by: Maria Clara Lobregat
- Succeeded by: Celso Lobregat

Vice-Mayor of Zamboanga City
- In office June 30, 2001 – January 2, 2004
- Mayor: Maria Clara Lobregat
- Preceded by: Roberto Ko
- Succeeded by: Maria Isabelle Climaco

Member of the Philippine House of Representatives from Zamboanga City
- In office June 30, 2007 – June 30, 2013
- Preceded by: Newly created
- Succeeded by: Lilia Macrohon-Nuño
- Constituency: 2nd district
- In office June 30, 2004 – June 30, 2007
- Preceded by: Celso Lobregat
- Succeeded by: District divided
- Constituency: at-large

Member of the Zamboanga City Council
- In office June 30, 1992 – June 30, 2001

Personal details
- Born: September 12, 1957 (age 69) Zamboanga City, Philippines
- Party: Independent (2018–present)
- Other political affiliations: Nacionalista (2007–2018); LDP (2004–2007)
- Spouse: Melinda Villanueva-Fabian
- Education: Ateneo de Zamboanga University

Erico Basilio Apolinario Fabian (born September 12, 1957), locally known as Erbie Fabian, is a Filipino politician. He served in the Zamboanga City Council and served as vice mayor, mayor and a representative.

== Early life and education ==
Erbie, as he was fondly called, was born on September 12, 1957. His father was a well-known painter, Eric Fabian, and his mother, Gloria Apolinario Fabian, was a grade school teacher of the Ateneo de Zamboanga. He is the eldest of seven children—three boys and four girls.

Fabian then took his elementary, high school and college education at the Ateneo de Zamboanga University. He then went on to obtain his nursing diploma at the Zamboanga General Hospital School of Nursing in 1978.

After college, Fabian became a disc jockey, a reporter, a newscaster and television host for more than a decade. He then decided to run for public office in 1992.

== Political career ==
From 1992 to 2001, Fabian was elected as a city councilor. One of his most important contributions as a councilor was his Think Health program. He crafted the Magna Carta for Health Workers and initiated the guidelines the present Tourism Code.

In 2001, Fabian ran and won as city vice-mayor. During his term, he was elected as regional president for western Mindanao of the Vice-Mayors’ League of the Philippines, initiating the conduct of the passage of a resolution supporting the ‘Balikatan 02-01’, Joint RP-US Military Exercise (in battling the Abu Sayyaf and other terrorist groups in Western Mindanao) during the quarterly assembly of the National Vice-Mayors’ League of the Philippines.

=== Mayor ===
In 2004, with the untimely death of the Mayor Maria Clara Lobregat, Fabian became the city mayor by succession. Within his six-month term as city mayor, he was able to implement several infrastructure projects and pass the Supplemental Budget for 2004.

=== Congress ===
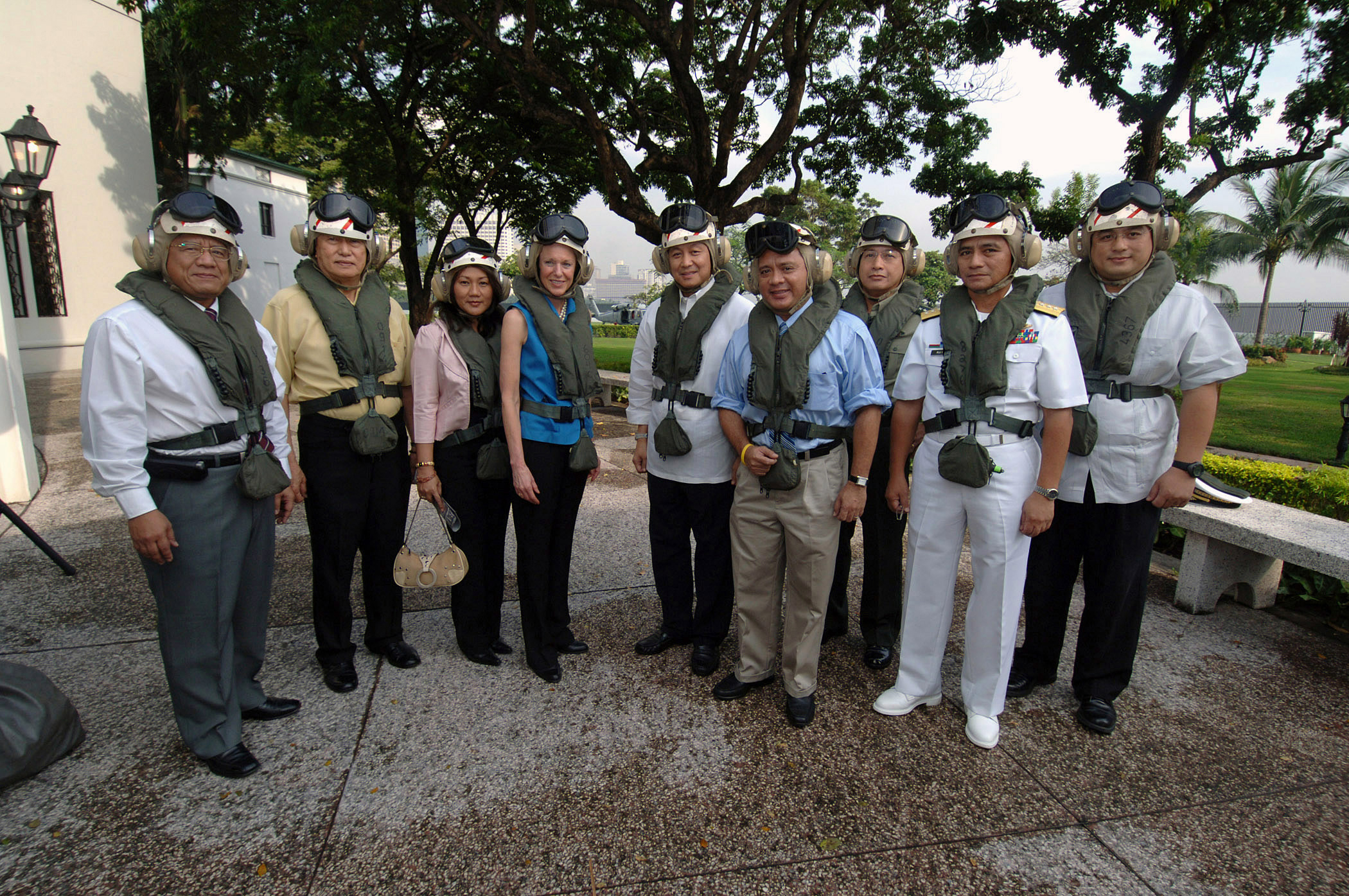
Erico Basilio Fabian in a group picture (light blue shirt)

Six months serving as acting mayor, Fabian ran for Congress representing the Lone District of Zamboanga City.

=== The split ===
Fabian is term-bounded and cannot run for another term and is poised to run for the mayorship in the next elections. But the Adelante Zamboanga Party endorsed, with the initiative of Mayor Celso Lobregat, incumbent District I Representative Beng Climaco for the mayorship.

Felt being junked by his former party mates in Lobregat's camp, Fabian decided to run against Climaco-Salazar under the banner of a new party, the Fuerza Zamboanga. Lobregat denied Fabian's allegations citing that Fabian confirmed that he will not run for a new post and consider retirement.

During the 2013 elections, Fabian lost to Representative Climaco in an overwhelming margin. As the election unofficial results found that Climaco was leading by a wide margin, Fabian announced his concession and congratulates Climaco for winning the election. “I concede defeat and I would like to congratulate my dear friend Beng Climaco,” Fabian said in a press statement.

== Personal life ==
Fabian is married to Melinda Villanueva-Fabian.

== See also ==
- 2010 Zamboanga City local elections
- 2013 Zamboanga City local elections
- Zamboanga City
