= Beng Climaco =

Filipino politician (born 1966)

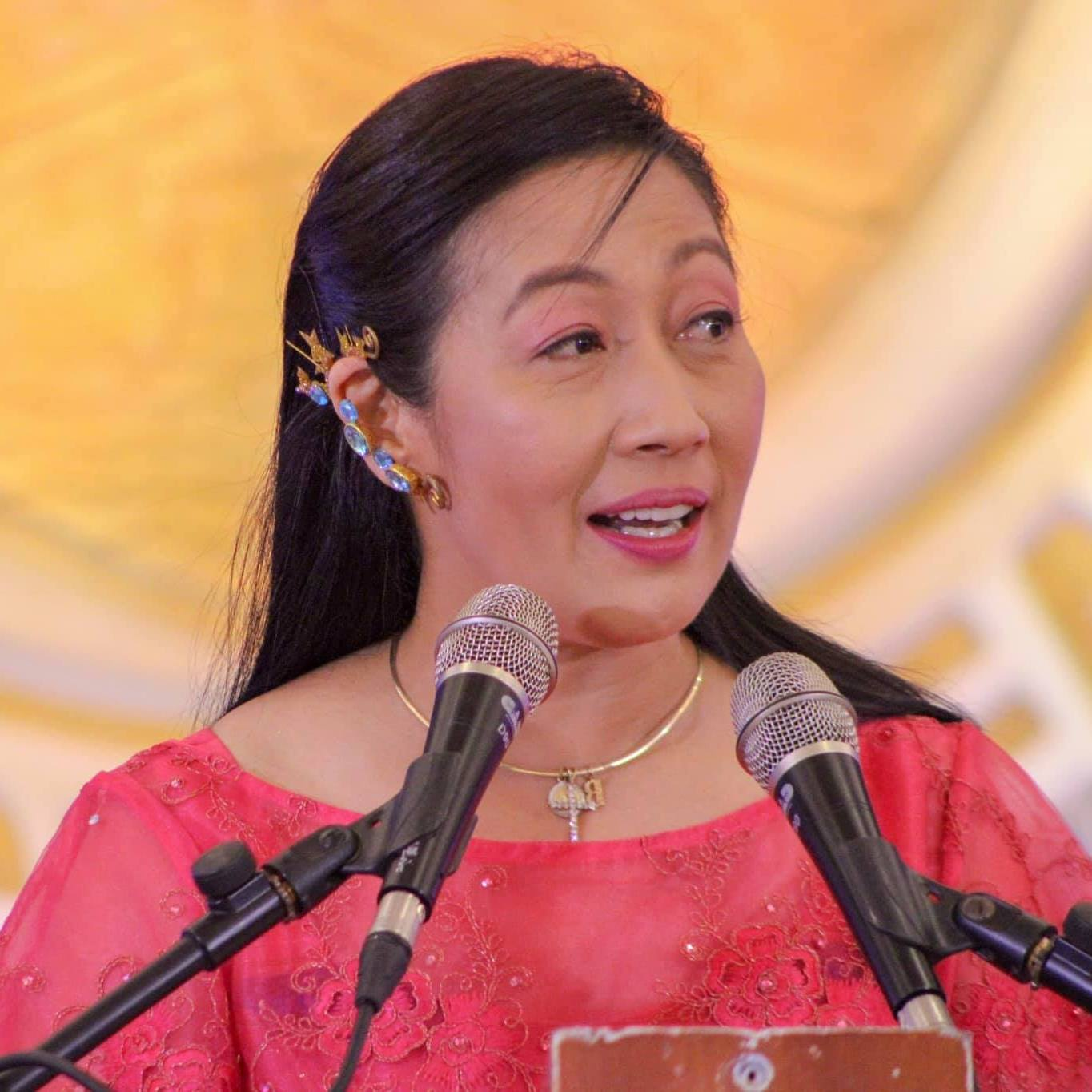
- Climaco in 2019

21st Mayor of Zamboanga City
- In office June 30, 2013 – June 30, 2022
- Vice Mayor: Cesar Iturralde (2013–2019); Rommel Agan (2019–2022)
- Preceded by: Celso L. Lobregat
- Succeeded by: John M. Dalipe

Vice Mayor of Zamboanga City
- Incumbent
- Assumed office June 30, 2025
- Mayor: Khymer Olaso
- Preceded by: Josephine E. Pareja
- In office January 2, 2004 – June 30, 2007
- Mayor: Erico Fabian (2004); Celso L. Lobregat (2004–2007)
- Preceded by: Erico Fabian
- Succeeded by: Manuel Jose Dalipe

Deputy Speaker of the Philippine House of Representatives for Mindanao
- In office July 26, 2010 – June 30, 2013
- Preceded by: Simeon Datumanong
- Succeeded by: Dina Abad

Member of the Philippine House of Representatives from Zamboanga City's 1st District
- In office June 30, 2007 – June 30, 2013
- Preceded by: Post created
- Succeeded by: Celso L. Lobregat

Member of the Zamboanga City Council
- In office June 30, 1998 – January 2, 2004

Personal details
- Born: Maria Isabelle Garcia Climaco; September 7, 1966 (age 59) Zamboanga City, Philippines
- Party: Liberal (2007–present); AZAP (local party; 2024–present)
- Other political affiliations: PAZ (2018–2024); LDP (2000–2007); LAMMP (1998–2000)
- Spouse: Trifonio Salazar (m. 2009; died 2023)
- Education: Ateneo de Zamboanga University; Ateneo de Manila University
- Occupation: Politician
- Profession: Teacher

Maria Isabelle Climaco Salazar (born Maria Isabelle Garcia Climaco, September 7, 1966), also known as Beng Climaco, is a Filipino politician, who is currently serving as the Vice Mayor of Zamboanga City in Mindanao, Philippines. Prior to this she was the former Mayor for 3 terms, councilor of the city's 1st district for two terms, and also the vice mayor from 2004-2007. She is the second woman to become a mayor of Zamboanga City. She unsuccessfully sought for a seat representing the 1st District of Zamboanga City in 2022 and before making a comeback by winning the vice mayoral election in 2025.

She is the second woman to become mayor of Zamboanga City. After an unsuccessful bid for the 1st District congressional seat in 2022, she made a comeback by winning the vice mayoral election in 2025 with a decisive margin under the Adelante Zamboanga Party.

== Early life and family ==
Beng Climaco is the daughter of former Vice Mayor Jose Climaco and the niece of former Mayor Cesar Climaco.

== Education ==
She is a graduate of Parsippany Hills High School in Parsippany–Troy Hills, New Jersey, in the United States. She earned her Bachelor of Science in Education degree from Ateneo de Zamboanga University and her Masters in family counseling from Ateneo de Manila University. She was a guidance counselor and taught English and Religion at the Ateneo de Zamboanga University.

She was awarded with international scholarships, namely the International Visitor Leadership Program, the American Council for Young Political Leaders and the Hubert Humphrey Scholarship Program. Likewise, Rotary International also recognized her significant contribution to civil society by choosing her to be part of the Rotary Group Study Exchange in Brazil. She was awarded with a Rotary International Presidential Citation by the Rotary Club of Metro Zamboanga in her incumbency as club president.

She became Head of the Delegation of the Philippine Council of Young Political Leaders to the International Exchange Program of the Australian Political Exchange Council in Melbourne, Canberra and Sydney, Australia, and also became the co-head of the Philippine delegation and a resource person to the 8th International Conference of AIDS in Asia and the Pacific (ICAAP) held in Colombo, Sri Lanka.

== Early career ==
In 1992, she became a reporter and then newscaster for Zamboanga City's Golden Broadcast Professionals. She became one of the co-anchors of the then-English version of Dateline Zamboanga until 1998 when she left to run for councilor, a race she won.

== Political career ==
=== City Council stint, 1998-2004 ===
As a councilor of Zamboanga City for two terms, she filed 858 council resolutions that advocated for women, family, youth, children, education, work and social welfare. One of her pieces of legislation, the creation of the Multi-Sectoral Anti-AIDS Council, presently brings various awards to the city. One is the Trailblazer Award of the country's prestigious Gawad Galing Pook. Another legislative measure is the Child Internet Protection Ordinance which protects minors from the influences of pornography on the Internet and as well as the introduction of the Gender and Development Program and the Implementation of R.A. 7192 in Zamboanga City.

=== Vice-mayor, 2004-2007 ===
On January 2, 2004, she was appointed as Vice Mayor after then-Vice Mayor Fabian elevated to the position of Mayor after the death of then-Mayor Ma. Clara Lobregat. She ran for re-election on the same year and won by a landslide, garnering votes more than any other candidate in the history of the City of Zamboanga, making her the youngest and first elected woman vice mayor of the city. On her watch, the city council of Zamboanga was named the Second Most Outstanding Council in the country.

=== City Representative, 2007-2013 ===
First term, 2007-2010

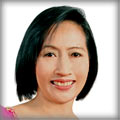
Official portrait, 2010

Because of her achievements as vice mayor in city council, the residents of Zamboanga City voted her representative of the 1st District to the 14th Philippine Congress in May 2007, where she became the first congresswoman to occupy the post. Despite being a neophyte member of the 14th Congress, she is vice chairman of the Committees on Women, Local Government, the Special Committees on East Asian Growth Area, and the Special Committee on Education and Welfare of Special Persons.

She was one of the authors of the House Bill seeking the Magna Carta for Women in this Congress which was passed as a law August 2009. Likewise, she also spearheaded the Lady Legislators of the 14th Congress, in launching Pink October, the first-ever breast cancer awareness and prevention campaign in the House of Representatives.

Second term, 2010-2013

In her second term, Representative Maria Isabelle Climaco-Salazar was elected as House Deputy Speaker for Mindanao.

=== City Mayor, 2013-2022 ===
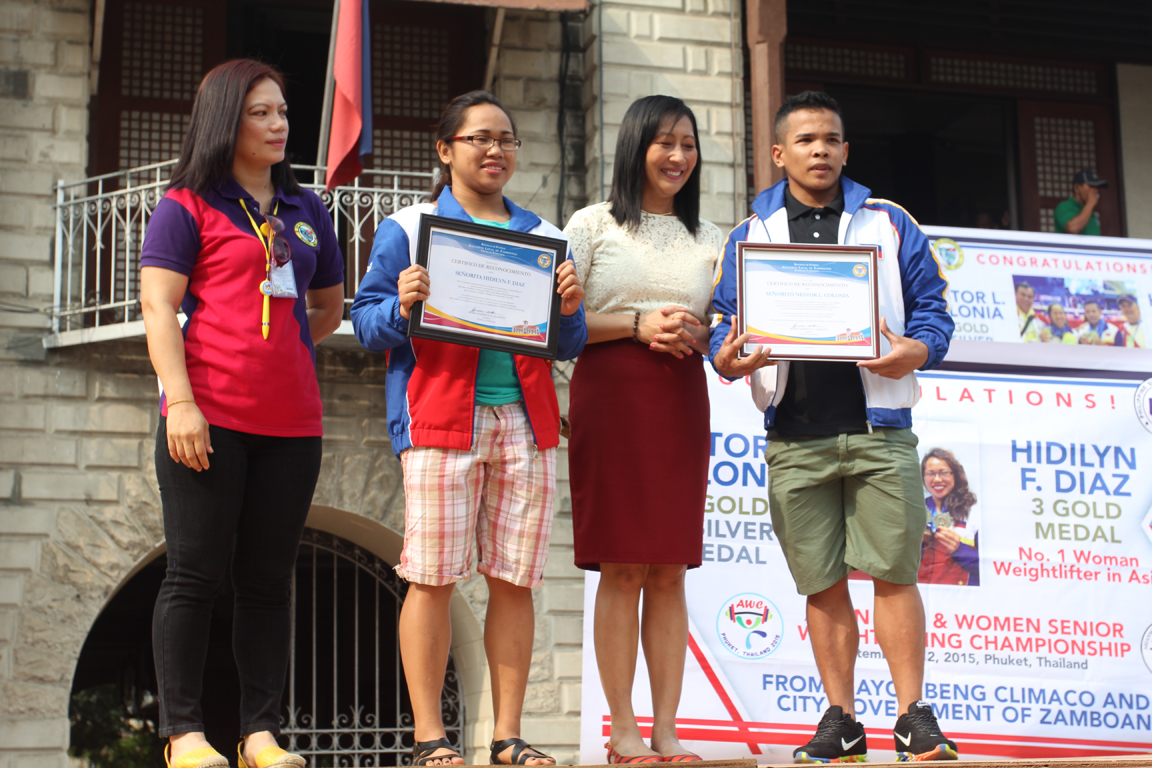
Mayor Climaco (first to the right) honors and recognizes weightlifters Hidilyn Diaz (second to the left) and Nestor Colonia (second to the right) in September 2015.

In 2013, Climaco was elected as Mayor of Zamboanga City. However barely three months in office, Salazar was beset by lawless MNLF elements attacking the city proper in September 2013 crippling the city's economic and social life.

Climaco also promotes the Chavacano language as part of Zamboanga's culture. The Dia de Fundacion del Chavacano, an annual June 23 celebration aims to promote the language through the launch of new Chavacano books such as dictionaries and grammar books and quiz bees for local schools.

In the 2022 Zamboanga City local elections, Climaco ran for the 1st District congressional seat but was unsuccessful. She made a political comeback in the 2025 elections, running for vice mayor under the Adelante Zamboanga Party (AZAP). She won decisively with 216,261 votes (62.88%), defeating Lakas–CMD candidate Vino Guingona (119,826 votes / 34.84%) and independent Sophia Taup. She assumed office on June 30, 2025, serving alongside Mayor Khymer Olaso.

== Personal life ==
On February 28, 2009, Beng wed Retired General Trifonio Salazar. Her wedding coincided with the birthday of her late uncle Mayor Cesar C. Climaco to honor the influence has had in her life.
