= Celso Lobregat =

Filipino politician (born 1948)

Celso L. Lobregat
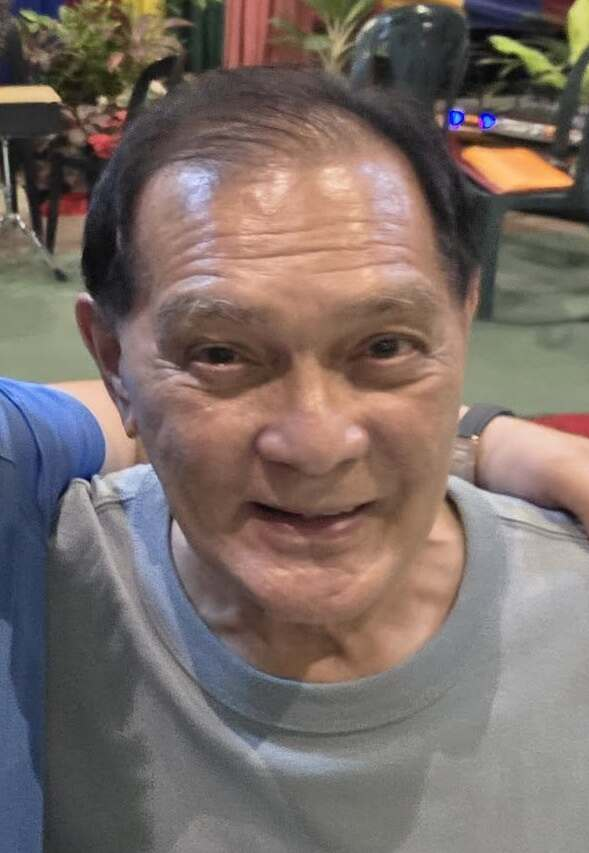
- Lobregat in 2026

20th Mayor of Zamboanga City
- In office June 30, 2004 – June 30, 2013
- Vice Mayor: Maria Isabelle Climaco Salazar (2004–2007); Mannix Dalipe (2007–2010); Cesar Iturralde (2010–2013)
- Preceded by: Erbie Fabian (acting)
- Succeeded by: Maria Isabelle Climaco Salazar

Member of the Philippine House of Representatives from Zamboanga City
- In office June 30, 2013 – June 30, 2019
- Preceded by: Maria Isabelle Climaco Salazar
- Succeeded by: Cesar Jimenez Jr.
- Constituency: 1st district
- In office June 30, 1998 – June 30, 2004
- Preceded by: Maria Clara Lobregat
- Succeeded by: Erbie Fabian
- Constituency: at-large

Personal details
- Born: Celso Lorenzo Lobregat, III; March 20, 1948 (age 78) Manila, Philippines
- Party: LDP (1998–2018; 2021–present)
- Other political affiliations: PDP–Laban (2018–2021)
- Spouse: Nona Panlilio
- Parent: Maria Clara Lorenzo-Lobregat (mother)
- Education: Ateneo de Manila University, Asian Institute of Management
- Occupation: Businessman

Celso Lorenzo Lobregat, III (born March 20, 1948), is a Filipino politician who served as Zamboanga City's mayor and congressman.

== Political family ==
Lobregat comes from a long line of landlord-politicians from Mindanao. His grandfather Pablo Lorenzo, was once mayor of Zamboanga City and a delegate to the Constitutional Convention of 1934. In the Quirino administration, Don Pablo Lorenzo held several cabinet positions, which included Secretary of Education and Secretary of Public Works. During the Macapagal administration, he was chair of the Development Bank of the Philippines.

Celso's mother, Maria Clara Lobregat, was a delegate to the 1971 Philippine Constitutional Convention and was a three-term Congresswoman of Zamboanga City, starting 1987. She was elected City Mayor in 1998 and reelected in 2001.

== Education ==
Celso attended De La Salle University, Manila, then Ateneo de Manila University, where he graduated with a bachelor's degree in Economics with honors. He took up his post graduate studies at the Asian Institute of Management graduating in 1972 with a Masters in Business Management.

Before entering public service, agriculture and business had been Celso's field of concentration and expertise. He worked for the Elizalde group of companies for eleven years and held several key executive positions such as Marketing Manager for Elizalde International, and managing director and general manager of Tanduay Distillery. It was during Celso's watch that the firm exported its products for the first time to the US market and won several medals and awards in various international competitions of wines and spirits.

== Political career ==
=== Congressman (1998–2004) ===
In 1998, he ran for Congress under the Laban ng Demokratikong Pilipino representing the Lone District of Zamboanga City and won with his mother as Mayor. He served as a representative from 1998 to 2004.

During his first term 1998 – 2001, national projects worth over P2.2 billion were initiated and/or implemented.

=== Mayor (2004–13) ===
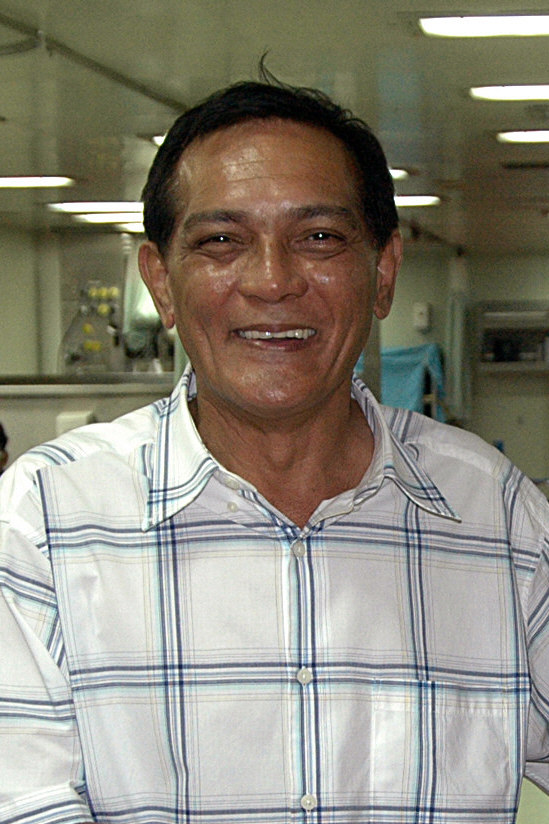
Lobregat in 2006

He was elected mayor for three terms from 2004 to 2013, replacing his mother Maria Clara Lobregat.

=== Congressman (2013–19) ===
He was elected again for Congressman of District I, under Laban ng Demokratikong Pilipino. He servered as a representative for a total of four terms, including his 1999–2004 term.

=== Partido Demokratiko Pilipino ===
He joined the Partido Demokratiko Pilipino in 2016, and is the head of the party in Zamboanga City.
