= Legislative districts of Zamboanga City =

The legislative districts of Zamboanga City are the representations of the highly urbanized city of Zamboanga in the various national legislatures of the Philippines. The city is currently represented in the lower house of the Congress of the Philippines through its first and second congressional districts.

== History ==
Prior to gaining separate representation, areas now under the jurisdiction of Zamboanga City were represented under the Department of Mindanao and Sulu (1917–1935), Zamboanga Province (1935–1953), Zamboanga del Sur (1953–1972) and Region IX (1978–1984).

Having been re-classified as a highly urbanized city on November 22, 1983, Zamboanga City was granted separate representation for the first time in 1984, when it returned one representative, elected at large, to the Regular Batasang Pambansa.

Under the new Constitution which was proclaimed on February 11, 1987, the city constituted a lone congressional district, and elected its member to the restored House of Representatives starting that same year.

The enactment of Republic Act No. 9269 on March 19, 2004 increased Zamboanga City's representation by reapportioning it into two congressional districts, which began to elect their separate representatives in the 2007 elections. Veterans Avenue forms a significant portion of the boundary line between the two districts.

== 1st District ==
- Barangays: Ayala, Bagong Calarian, Baliwasan, Baluno, Cabatangan, Camino Nuevo, Campo Islam, Canelar, Capisan, Cawit, Dulian (Upper Pasonanca), La Paz, Labuan, Limpapa, Maasin, Malagutay, Mariki, Pamucutan, Pasonanca, Patalon, Recodo, Rio Hondo, San Jose Cawa-Cawa, San Jose Gusu, San Roque, Santa Barbara, Santa Maria, Santo Niño, Sinubung, Sinunuc, Talisayan, Tulungatung, Tumaga, Zone 1, Zone 2, Zone 3, Zone 4
- Population (2020): 448,390

Period	Representative
14th Congress; 2007–2010	Maria Isabelle G. Climaco-Salazar
15th Congress; 2010–2013	Maria Isabelle G. Climaco-Salazar
16th Congress; 2013–2016	Celso L. Lobregat
17th Congress; 2016–2019	Celso L. Lobregat
18th Congress; 2019–2022	Cesar L. Jimenez, Jr.
19th Congress; 2022–2025	Khymer Adan T. Olaso
20th Congress; 2025–Present	Katrina Reiko C. Tai

== 2nd District ==
- Barangays: Arena Blanco, Boalan, Bolong, Buenavista, Bunguiao, Busay, Cabaluay, Cacao, Calabasa, Culianan, Curuan, Dita, Divisoria, Dulian (Upper Bunguiao), Guisao, Guiwan, Kasanyangan, Lamisahan, Landang Gua, Landang Laum, Lanzones, Lapakan, Latuan, Licomo, Limaong, Lubigan, Lumayang, Lumbangan, Lunzuran, Mampang, Manalipa, Mangusu, Manicahan, Mercedes, Muti, Pangapuyan, Panubigan, Pasilmanta, Pasobolong, Putik, Quiniput, Salaan, Sangali, Santa Catalina, Sibulao, Tagasilay, Taguiti, Talabaan, Talon-Talon, Taluksangay, Tetuan, Tictapul, Tigbalabag, Tictabon, Tolosa, Tugbungan, Tumalutap, Tumitus, Victoria, Vitali, Zambowood
- Population (2020): 528,844

Period	Representative
14th Congress; 2007–2010	Erico Basilio A. Fabian
15th Congress; 2010–2013	Erico Basilio A. Fabian
16th Congress; 2013–2016	Lilia Macrohon-Nuño
17th Congress; 2016–2019	Manuel Jose M. Dalipe
18th Congress; 2019–2022	Manuel Jose M. Dalipe
19th Congress; 2022–2025	Manuel Jose M. Dalipe
20th Congress; 2025–Present	Jerry E. Perez

== Lone District (defunct) ==
Period	Representative
8th Congress; 1987–1992	Ma. Clara L. Lobregat
9th Congress; 1992–1995	Ma. Clara L. Lobregat
10th Congress; 1995–1998	Ma. Clara L. Lobregat
11th Congress; 1998–2001	Celso L. Lobregat
12th Congress; 2001–2004	Celso L. Lobregat
13th Congress; 2004–2007	Erico Basilio A. Fabian

== At-Large (defunct) ==
Period	Representative
Regular Batasang Pambansa; 1984–1986	vacant (Note: Cesar C. Climaco was declared the winner of May 1984 election, but he did not assume office in protest. He died on November 14, 1984. Zamboanga City's seat remained vacant until the abolition of the Batasang Pambansa in 1986.)

== See also ==
- Legislative district of Mindanao and Sulu
- Legislative district of Zamboanga
- Legislative district of Zamboanga del Sur
