= Siege of Fort Pilar =

1898 siege part of the Philippine Revolution

Siege of Fort Pilar Zamboanga Revolution
- Part of the Philippine Revolution
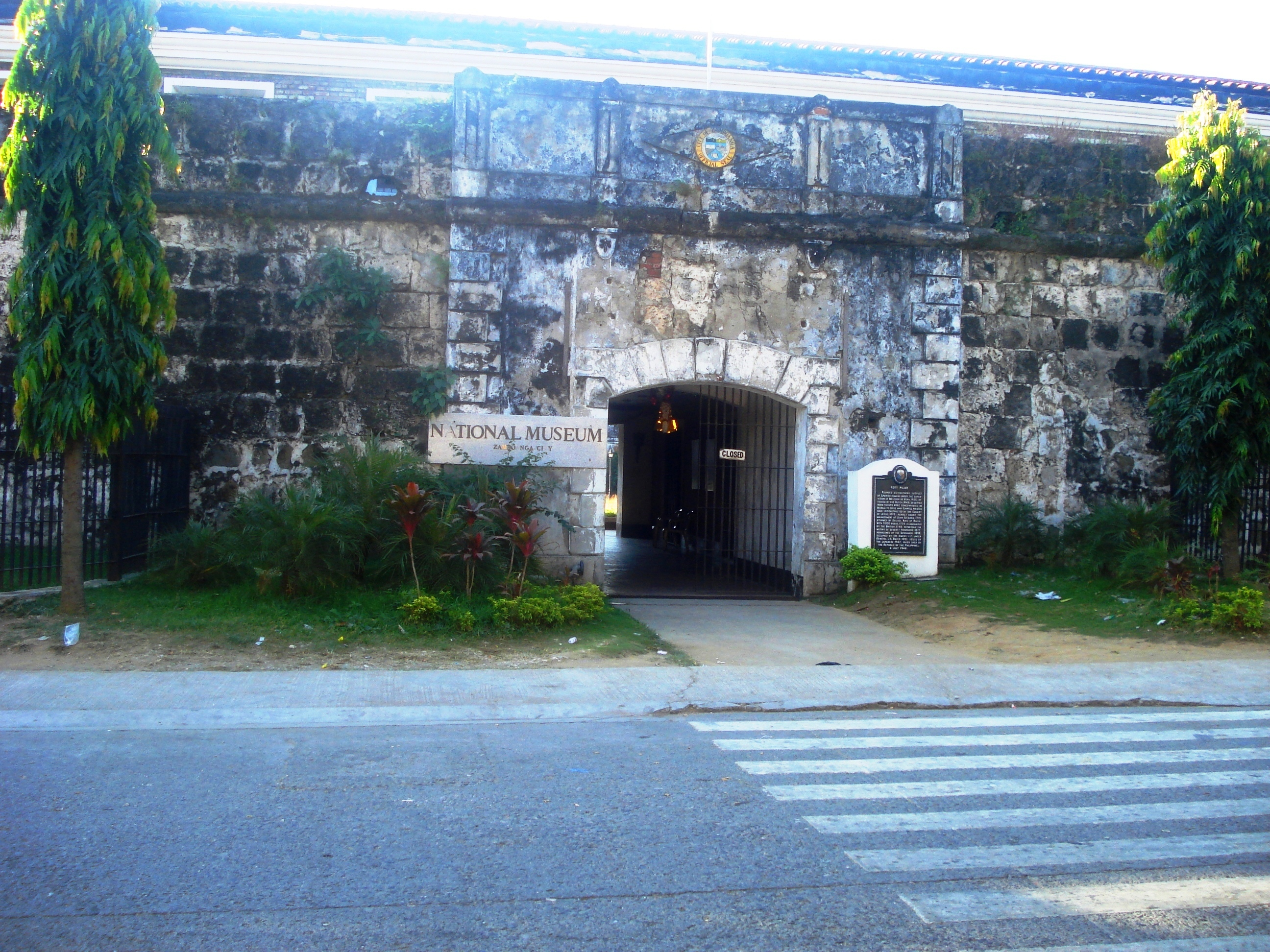
- Entrance of Fort Pilar (Present Day)
Date	May 18, 1898
Location	Town of Zamboanga
Result	Zamboangueño Victory
Territorial changes	Republic of Zamboanga was established after siege

Belligerents
Katipunan; Mindanao Region; Zamboangueño revolutionary forces	(Spain) Spanish Empire

Commanders and leaders
Vicente Alvarez	(Spain) Diego de los Ríos (surrendered)

Strength
8,000 men	700 soldiers

Casualties and losses
Unknown	Unknown

The siege of Fort Pilar was fought between April and May 1898 on then-town of Zamboanga in Mindanao as a part of the Philippine Revolution. One of the only few actions against Spanish colonials forces in Mindanao, the victory brought about by the Zamboangueño Ethnolinguistic Nation, after their capture of Fort Pilar several weeks later, paved way for the foundation of the short-lived Republic of Zamboanga.

== Background ==
When the Philippine Revolution spread to Mindanao, General Vicente Alvarez organized an army of Christian Filipinos, Tribal warriors, and Muslim Krismen and fought the Spaniards for freedom’s sake.

Alvarez initiated the revolution in Zamboanga, in March 1898. He was able to take control of the peninsula, except the port of Zamboanga and Fort Pilar, which were fortified by the Spanish forces. He then organized the Zamboangueño Revolutionary Government along with his aides-de-camp Felipe Ramos and Melanio Calixto. Calixto was promoted to Major, Ramos as Captain and in command of the two companies assisted by Captain Gowito Sebastian, and Alvarez who was unanimously designated as the general of the revolutionary forces. Together, they constituted the Revolutionary Council.

The Governor-General of Mindanao Island, General Jaramillo, transferred his command to General Montero, ex-governor of Cebu, and left for Manila in December 1898.

== Prelude ==
The revolutionaries much needed military arms came to them when a fortunate thing happened in favor of them. One of the two ships owned by a gunrunner based in Sandakan that supplied arms, ammunition and food to the Spanish forces in Tawi-Tawi, Jolo and Basilan and Zamboanga, ran aground near the Mariki Island because of a sudden storm. As a result, he decided to take all the men along, leaving behind the arms cargo of the fateful ship. When this information reached Alvarez who transferred the Revolutionary Command to Masinloc (present-day Arena Blanco), he ordered his men to look over the ship. They were able to get the rifles, guns, ammunition, food and others much needed supplies.

=== The Battle of Santa Barbara ===
The Revolutionary Council based at Masinloc was able to plan the attack on Fort Pilar after being fully armed. Anticipating the attack, the Spaniards set up the first line of defense but the revolutionary forces were able to penetrate the Spanish defense line by the use of native fishing boats that stole into Santa Barbara landing just below the Barrio’s wharf. Santa Barbara was set on fire by the revolutionary forces following the evacuation of the residents. By March 1898, General Alvarez decided to temporarily withdraw his forces from the battle scene leaving a few men within the vicinity to keep vigil over the Spaniards inside the fort.

== The Siege begins ==
Hostilities were resumed on April 27, 1898. Prior to that, massive troop preparations were made by the revolutionary forces within the vicinity. General Alvarez wanted to inflict a major assault on the enemies' side. Realizing their vulnerability to the attack coming from the revolutionary forces, the Spanish troops withdrew and regrouped inside Fort Pilar where they could make their last stand. The Spanish troops and the revolutionary forces continued to exchange fire for three days as the former did not want to surrender. Spanish artillery fire began to slacken its tempo and the revolutionary forces took the advantage of it and ordered the artillery forces to increase the bombardment.

=== First call for Truce ===
When General Alvarez saw that the Spanish troops could was on the verge of losing the fight, Alvarez called for a truce. Captain Gowito was chosen as head of the truce team. The truce team conveyed the message of Gen. Alvarez that the fort defenders were fighting a losing war and demanded for their surrender. Captain Sebastian said that he would mean an end to the hostilities and free passage to all Spanish forces outside on their way to Manila. At first, General de los Rios refused the conditions of the truce on grounds that it would involve international protocol. However, he appealed to General Alvarez through Captain Sebastian to allow the civilians and dependent inside the fort to leave Zamboanga under a flag of truce.

Alvarez agreed but that no military personnel from the Spanish side would be allowed out of the fort. Thereafter, his men were posted close to the fort to make certain that no one among the Spanish troops would sneak out. The evacuation of the family and dependents of the Spanish troops took several days; some of them who were wounded were boarded. Those who were natives of Zamboanga and preferred to remain were evacuated to the suburbs.

=== The Siege continues ===
By May 10, the Spanish personnel inside the fort were surprised to see their fortress surrounded on all sides by the force headed by Captain Ramos along the delta and Major Calixto whose men were already posted across from the aqueduct along the beach. At this point in time, the Spanish forces inside the fort prepared themselves for the attack. General Alvarez sent Captain Sebastian to inform General de los Rios that the truce was formally ended and that the attack would follow. General Alvarez knew that both sides were preparing for the eventuality and it was just as matter of time when the fort would fall into his hands.

Evidently, the Spanish Governor General wanted General Alvarez to take the initiative, which he did by ordering the guns position behind to fire the first salvo immediately after Captain Sebastian had returned. The exchange of fires between the Spanish troops and revolutionary forces resumed despite the fact that the Spaniards were no longer in a position to make use of the cannons mounted on the breastwork. By the following week of May, there was hardly any of the fort defenders who would post himself on the parapets. More forces from the revolutionary side were arriving to surround the fort and demoralize the Spanish forces.

== The surrender of the Fort ==
On May 17, General de los Rios finally gave up the fight and admitted the defeat of the Spanish forces when a white flag was hoisted above the breastwork. He sent a small party under a flag of truce to get in touch with General Alvarez that he would surrender the fort. Thus, General Alvarez ordered his men to hold their fire. The bugle was sounded inside the fort and this was followed by the opening of the massive doors of the gate. The Spanish forces inside the fort were lined at the square with their rifles orderly piled before them. General de los Rios and some of his men stood in formation; he was help up by an aide as he was badly wounded on the knee.

General Alvarez, together with Major Calixto, Captain Ramos, Captain Sebastian and Isidro Midel entered the fort on the morning of May 18, 1898. General de los Rios saluted General Alvarez to acknowledge his victory; General Alvarez also returned the courtesy. De los Rios, turned over his saber, the symbol of Spanish sovereignty to General Alvarez in a colorful and elaborate surrender ceremonies held in that morning.

== Conclusion ==
The surrender marks the true date of independence of the Philippine Islands, Mindanao and Sulu from the Spanish Crown.

On the same day, General Baldomero Aguinaldo, cousin of President Emilio Aguinaldo, arrived in Zamboanga carrying the presidential message confirming Alvarez' title as General of the Philippine Revolutionary Forces.

== Aftermath ==
On May 23, 1898, the Spanish departed for Manila aboard the S.S. Leon XIII, Governor-General de los Rios succumbing along the way to a mortal wound he received in one of the rebel assaults.

After the siege, the Republic of Zamboanga was formed, but the duration of this revolutionary state came just short when Americans, after their victory in the Spanish–American War began to occupy Fort Pilar itself in December 1898, and was effectively disestablished in March 1903.
