= Herth =

Herth is a surname. Notable people with the surname include:

- Antoine Herth (born 1963), French politician
- Milt Herth (1902–1989), American jazz organist

== See also ==
- Harth
