= Harth =

Harth is a surname. Notable people with the surname include:

- Alfred 23 Harth, German artist
- C. Ernst Harth (born 1970), Canadian actor
- Sidney Harth (1925–2011), American classical violinist and conductor
- Yoram Harth (born 1958), Israeli dermatologist

== See also ==
- Miguel Harth-Bedoya (born 1968), Peruvian conductor
- Hearth
- Iranian high-aspect-ratio twin-hull vessels (HARTH)
