= S. P. Meek =

American novelist

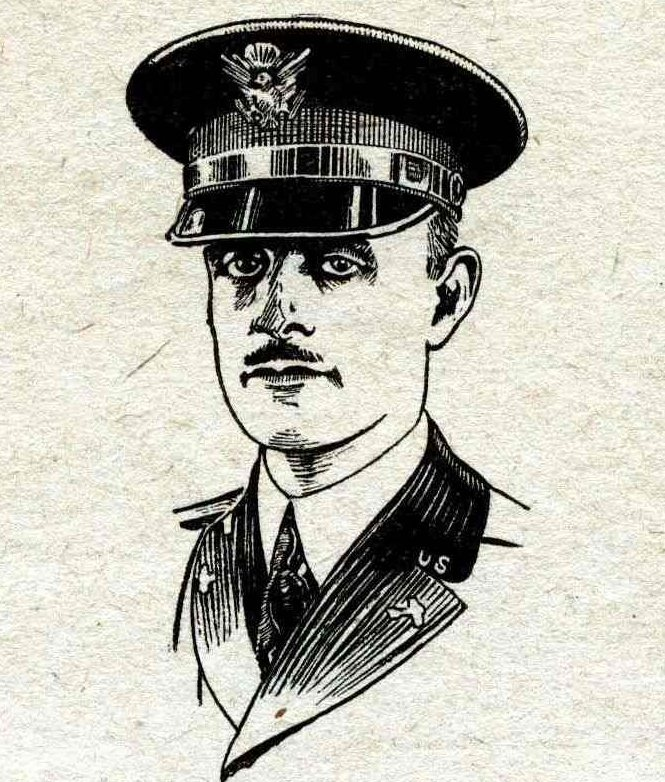
- S. P. Meek c.1930
- Born: April 8, 1894; Chicago, IL
- Died: June 10, 1972 (aged 78); Palm Beach, FL
- Occupations: Writer, military officer
- Writing career
- Genres: science fiction, children's books

Sterner St. Paul Meek (April 8, 1894 in Chicago, Illinois – June 10, 1972) was an American military chemist, early science fiction author, and children's author. He published much of his work first as Capt. S.P. Meek, then, briefly, as Major S.P. Meek and, after 1933, as Col. S. P. Meek. He also published one story as Sterner St. Paul.

== Biography ==
Meek received his associate degree from University of Chicago in 1914 and his bachelor's degree in Metallurgical Engineering from University of Alabama in 1915. He continued his education at University of Wisconsin–Madison (1916) and MIT (1921–1923). He married in 1927 and had one son.

When the United States entered World War I in 1917, Meek joined the military as a chemist and ordnance expert. He served as Chief, Small Arms Ammunition Research, from 1923 to1926, and Chief Publications Officer, Ordnance Dept. from 1941 to 1945. He retired a colonel in 1947, at which point he became a full-time writer.

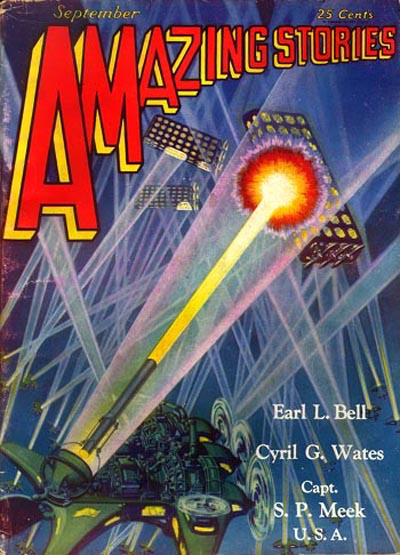
Meek's "The Red Peril" was the cover story in the September 1929 issue of Amazing Stories

== Writing career ==
Meek sold his first fiction story, "Taming Poachers", to Field and Stream, where it appeared in September 1928. Between early 1929 and January 1933, he published over 20 science fiction stories and short novels in pulp science fiction magazines like Astounding Science Fiction and Amazing Stories, most of them in his popular Dr. Bird and Operative Carnes series. Meek left the field in early 1933, with only one further science fiction story published in 1939.

Like many early pulp science fiction writers, Meek used fiction to give detailed descriptions of current and projected scientific advances. He utilized many contemporary science fiction tropes, e.g. the notion that atoms were miniaturized solar systems in his stories "Submicroscopic" and "Awlo of Ulm".

Meek quickly became popular with pulp magazine readers and was eagerly sought out by editors. In the first issue of Astounding Science Fiction in 1930, its editor Harry Bates listed Meek among "some of the finest writers of fantasy in the world", alongside Murray Leinster, Ray Cummings and others. However, Meek's stories were crudely executed and the higher standards introduced with the Golden Age of Science Fiction soon made them of strictly historical interest. Science fiction writer and critic Samuel R. Delany later called Meek's writing "unbelievably bad".

After Meek stopped writing science fiction, his disappearance from the industry was a mystery to readers until The Drums of Tapajos was reprinted in 1962. Meek published over twenty children's books between 1932 and 1956, starting with Jerry, the Adventures of an Army Dog, usually about dogs or horses. Many of these books drew on Meek's experiences in the military.

== Works ==
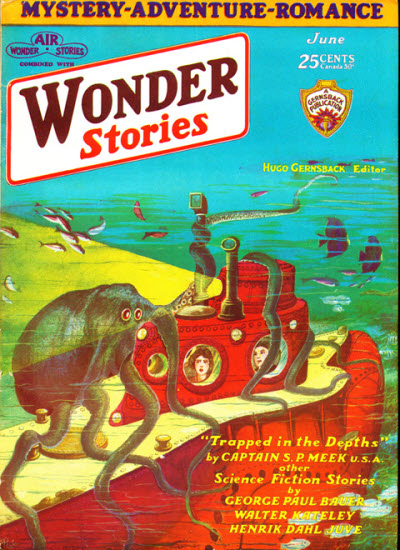
Meek's "Trapped in the Depths" was the cover story in the debut issue of Wonder Stories in 1930

=== Science fiction ===
- ”Futility”. Amazing Stories, July 1929
- ”The Red Peril”. Amazing Stories, September 1929
- ”The Perfect Counterfeit”, Scientific Detective, January 1930
- ”The Cave of Horror”. Astounding Stories of Super Science, January 1930
- ”The Thief of Time”. Astounding Stories of Super Science, February 1930
- "Cold Light”. Astounding Stories of Super Science, March 1930
- ”The Ray of Madness”. Astounding Stories of Super Science, April 1930
- "Trapped in the Depths". Wonder Stories, June 1930
- ”Beyond The Heaviside Layer”. Astounding Stories of Super Science, July 1930
- ”The Attack From Space”. Astounding Stories of Super Science, September 1930
- ”Stolen Brains”. Astounding Stories of Super-Science, October 1930
- "The Sea Terror”. Astounding Stories of Super Science, December 1930
- ”The Black Lamp”. Astounding Stories of Super Science, February 1931
- ”When Caverns Yawned”. Astounding Stories of Super Science, May 1931
- ”The Port of Missing Planes”. Astounding Stories of Super Science, August 1931
- ”Submicroscopic”. Amazing Stories, August 1931
- ”Awlo of Ulm”. Amazing Stories, September 1931
- ”30.000 B.C.” By Capt. S.P Meek. April 1932

==== The Atlantis series ====
- ”The Drums of Tapajos”. Amazing Stories, 1930. New York, Avalon Books, 1961, 224pp
- ”Troyana”, Amazing Stories, 1932. New York, Avalon Books, 1961, 224pp

==== Collections ====
- Arctic Bride. [London, Utopian Publications Ltd.], [1944]
- The Monkeys Have No Tails in Zamboanga. New York, W. Morrow & Company, 1935, 288pp.

=== Horror ===
- "Nasturtia". Strange Tales of Mystery and Terror, September 1931
- "The Black Mass". Strange Tales of Mystery and Terror, November 1931

=== Children's novels ===
- Jerry, the Adventures of an Army Dog. New York, London, The Century co, 1932, 235pp.
- Frog: The Horse That Knew No Master, New York, Grosset & Dunlap, 1933, 302pp.
- Gypsy Lad: the Story of a Champion Setter. New York, W. Morrow, 1934, 314pp.
- Franz : A Dog of the Police. Wm. Penn Publishing, 1935, 319pp.
- Dignity: a Springer Spaniel. Wm. Penn Publishing, 1937, 304pp.
- Island Born [as by J. P. Meek], New York, Godwin, 1937, 271 pp.
- Rusty, A Cocker Spaniel. Philadelphia, The Penn publishing company, 1938, 296pp.
- Gustav, a Son of Franz: a Police Dog in Panama. The Penn Publishing Co., 1940, 296pp.
- Pat: the Story of a Seeing Eye Dog. New York, Alfred A. Knopf, 1947, 190pp.
- Boots, the Story of a Working Sheep Dog. New York, Alfred A. Knopf, 1948, 234pp.
- Midnight, a Cow Pony. New York, Alfred A. Knopf, 1949, 217pp.
- Ranger, a Dog of the Forest Service. New York, Alfred A. Knopf, 1949, 232pp.
- Hans, A Dog of the Border Patrol, New York, Alfred A. Knopf, 1950, 253pp.
- Surfman: The Adventures of a Coast Guard Dog, New York, Alfred A. Knopf, 1950, 267pp.
- Pagan, A Border Patrol Horse. New York, Alfred A. Knopf, 1951, 238pp.
- Red, a Trailing Bloodhound. New York, Alfred A. Knopf, 1951, 225pp.
- Boy, An Ozark Coon Hound. New York, Alfred A. Knopf, 1952, 238pp.
- Rip, a Game Protector. New York, Alfred A. Knopf, 1952, 266pp.
- Omar, a State Police Dog. New York, Alfred A. Knopf, 1953, 240pp.
- Bellfarm Star: the Story of a Pacer. New York, Dodd, Mead, 1955, 213pp.
- Pierre of the Big Top: the Story of a Circus Poodle. New York, Dodd, Mead, 1956, 208pp.

=== Non-fiction ===
- So You're Going to Get a Puppy: A Dog-Lover's Handbook. New York, Alfred A. Knopf, 1947, 149pp. 7 printings through 1963.
