= Republic of Zamboanga =

1899–1903 polity in Zamboanga, Philippines

Republic of Zamboanga República de Zamboanga
- 1899–1903
- Status: Unrecognized state: Provisional government (1899); U.S. protectorate (1899–1903)
- Capital: Zamboanga
- Other languages: Chavacano, Spanish
- Demonym: Zamboangueño(a)
- Government: Republic
- Legislature: Chamber of Deputies
- Historical era: Philippine–American War
  - Established: May 1899
  - Disestablished: March 1903
Preceded by	Succeeded by
Spanish East Indies	Insular Government of the Philippine Islands
- Today part of: Philippines; Zamboanga City (previous actual control); Mindanao, Sulu, and Basilan (claimed territory)

The Republic of Zamboanga was a short-lived revolutionary government, founded by General Vicente Álvarez and the Zamboangueño Revolutionary Forces after the Spanish government in Zamboanga, Philippines officially surrendered and ceded Real Fuerte de Nuestra Señora La Virgen del Pilar de Zaragoza in May 1899. On May 28, 1899, Álvarez declared the territory's independence from the Spanish Empire, and became the republic's first and only genuinely elected president.

== History ==
=== Establishment ===
On February 28, 1899, in a house in Santa María, a revolutionary government was organized and General Vicente Álvarez was elected provisional president and commander-in-chief. He then planned to take Fort Pilar, the last Spanish stronghold in the Philippines.

=== End of Spanish rule ===
The state was formally established on May 18, 1899, with the surrender of Fort Pilar to the Revolutionary Government of Zamboanga headed by Álvarez. On May 23, 1899, the Spaniards finally evacuated Zamboanga, after burning down most of the city's buildings in contempt of the Zamboangueños' revolt.

=== American occupation ===
Álvarez's term was cut short when the commander of Tetuan, Isidro Midel, cooperated with the Americans in exchange for the presidency with his cohort, Datu Mandi. He then ordered the assassination of Major Melanio Calixto, acting commander of Zamboanga, because Álvarez was in Basilan to recruit more forces. On November 16, 1899, Midel flew the white flag over Fort Pilar to signal the occupying American forces to enter, leading to the overthrow of Álvarez's government. Álvarez and his allies were forced to flee to the nearby town of Mercedes, then to Basilan and eventual hiding. In December 1899, Captain Pratt of the 23rd U.S. Infantry arrived at Zamboanga and took control of Fort Pilar. Thereafter, the nascent republic became a U.S. protectorate, and Midel was allowed to continue as president for about sixteen months.

=== Decline and aftermath of the Republic ===
In March 1901, the Americans allowed the republic to hold elections and Mariano Arquiza was elected to succeed Midel as president. However, Arquiza's government did not exercise effective authority over Zamboanga and finally in March 1903, the Republic of Zamboanga was dissolved. The American colonial government thus designated Zamboanga as capital of the newly established Moro Province, which served as the provincial entity of Mindanao, with Brigadier General Leonard Wood as governor.

== Legacy ==
The Republic of Zamboanga during President Álvarez's term claimed territorial rights over the islands of Mindanao, Basilan, and Sulu, encompassing all of the southern Philippines in the midst of war against the Spanish, Americans, and natives of those islands. However, the Republic's actual sovereignty extended only to the current boundaries of Zamboanga City.

== See also ==
- Zamboanga City
- List of historical unrecognized countries
- "The Monkeys Have No Tails in Zamboanga"
