= Juke Box Jenny =

1942 film by Harold Young

Juke Box Jennie
- Directed by: Harold Young
- Written by: Robert Lees; Frederic I. Rinaldo; Arthur V. Jones; Dorcas Cochran
- Starring: Ken Murray; Harriet Hilliard; Iris Adrian; Don Douglas
- Cinematography: John W. Boyle
- Edited by: Paul Landres
- Production company: Universal Pictures
- Distributed by: Universal Pictures
- Release date: 27 March 1942
- Running time: 61 minutes
- Country: United States
- Language: English

Juke Box Jenny (also known as Fifty Million Nickels) is a 1942 American comedy musical film directed by Harold Young and starring Ken Murray, Harriet Hilliard, Iris Adrian, and Donald Douglas. The film is a musical comedy with songs performed by Charlie Barnet and his Orchestra, The King's Men, Wingy Manone and his Orchestra, The Milt Herth Trio, and The Eddie Beal Trio. The songs include "Fifty Million Nickels Can't Be Wrong", "Swing to Mother Goose", "Tiger Rag", "Macumba", and others.

== Plot ==
Roger Wadsworth, owner of a record company, is pressured by Mrs. Horton, a major stock holder in the company and mother of his fiancé Genevieve, to only produce recordings of classical music. Romantic complications follow with the involvement of his top salesman, Malcolm Hammond, who wants the company to produce jazz records, and a torch singer, Jinx Corey.

== Cast ==
- Ken Murray as Malcolm Hammond
- Harriet Hilliard as Genevieve Horton
- Iris Adrian as Jinx Corey
- Don Douglas as Roger Wadsworth
- Marjorie Gateson as Mrs. Horton
- Sig Arno as Randini
- Charles Halton as the judge
- William Ruhl as Jinx's lawyer
- Claire Du Brey as Miss Carruthers

== Musicians ==
- Charlie Barnet and His Orchestra
- The King's Men
- Wingy Manone and His Orchestra
- Milt Hert and His Trio

== Reviews ==
A New York Times review on 17 April 1942 described the movie as "a series of musical shorts strung out to feature-length [...] by means of a feeble yarn."
