= Charles W. Davis =

American Medal of Honor recipient (1917–1991)

Charles Willis Davis
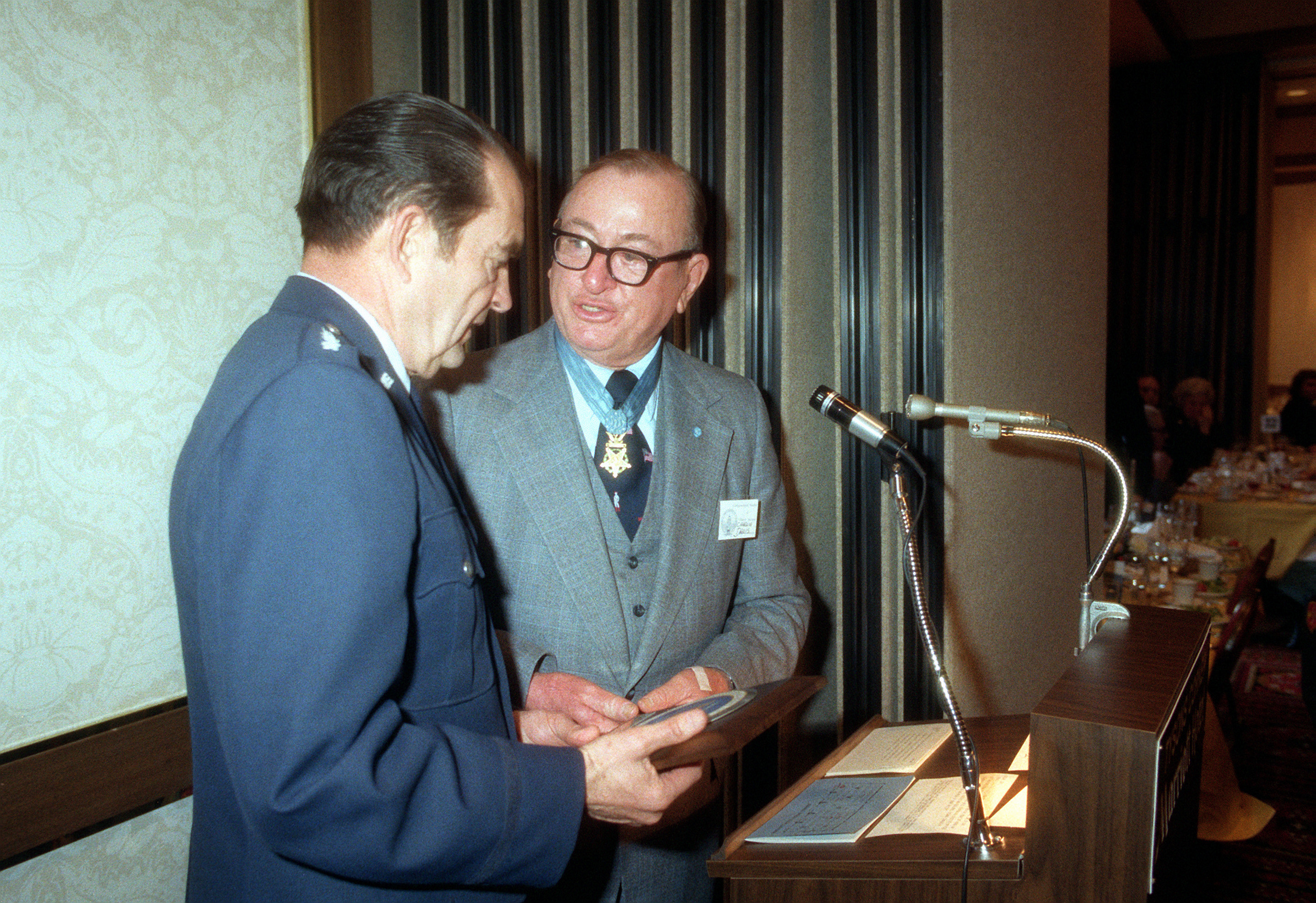
- Davis, at right, with General David C. Jones in 1981
- Born: February 21, 1917; Gordo, Alabama, U.S.
- Died: January 18, 1991 (aged 73); San Francisco, California, U.S.
- Burial place: Arlington National Cemetery
- Military career
- Allegiance: United States
- Branch: United States Army
- Rank: Colonel
- Units: 2nd Battalion, 27th Infantry Regiment, 25th Infantry Division
- Conflicts: World War II; *Guadalcanal Campaign; Korean War; Vietnam War
- Awards: Medal of Honor

Charles Willis Davis (February 21, 1917 – January 18, 1991) was a United States Army officer and a recipient of the United States military's highest decoration—the Medal of Honor—for his actions in World War II.

== Biography ==
Born February 21, 1917, Davis joined the Army from Montgomery, Alabama, and by January 12, 1943 was serving as a captain in the 27th Infantry Regiment, 25th Infantry Division. On that day, on the island of Guadalcanal during the Battle of Mount Austen, the Galloping Horse, and the Sea Horse, he volunteered to carry messages to several companies which were pinned down by Japanese fire. He stayed with the companies overnight. A knoll on the south edge of the ridge (the "horse's neck") leading to Hill 53 was the fulcrum of the Japanese defenses. The knoll contained several machine-gun and mortar positions which had effectively held off the American attacks across the ridge. As 2nd Battalion's executive officer Captain Davis volunteered to lead four other men against the knoll. Crawling on their bellies, Davis and his party crept to within 10 yd (9.1 m) of the enemy position. The Japanese defenders threw two grenades at them, but the grenades failed to explode. Davis and his men threw eight grenades at the Japanese, destroying several of their positions. Davis then stood up, and while shooting his rifle, then pistol with one hand, waved his men forward with the other as he advanced further onto the knoll. Davis and his men then killed or chased away the rest of the Japanese on the knoll. Silhouetted against the sky during the action, Davis was visible to the Americans all up and down the ridge. Inspired by his actions, plus replenished with water by a sudden thunderstorm, the American troops "came to life" and quickly assaulted and captured Hill 53 by noon. The Americans counted the bodies of 170 Japanese soldiers on and around the Galloping Horse. The Americans suffered fewer than 100 killed. He was subsequently promoted to major and, on July 17, 1943, awarded the Medal of Honor.

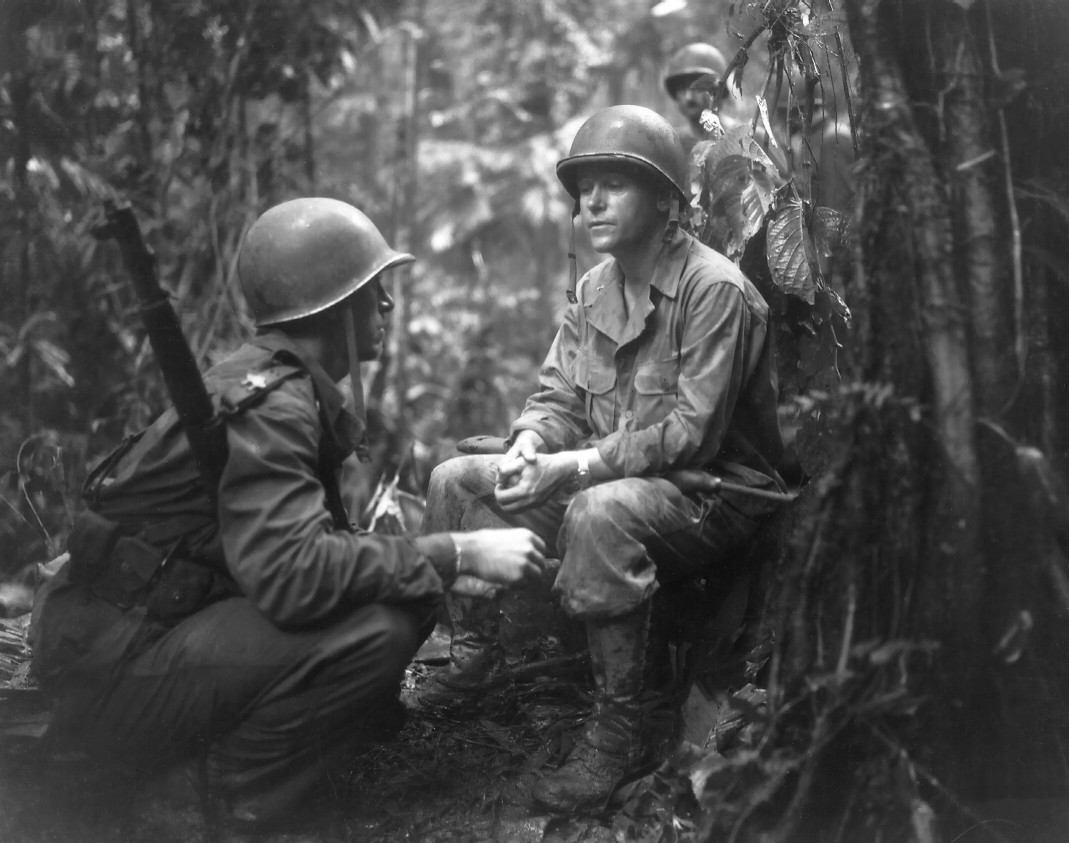
On the right, Major General J. L. Collins, commander of the 25th Division and, on the left, Major Charles W. Davis, commanding the 3rd Battalion, 27th Infantry Regiment confer on New Georgia, August 14, 1943.

Davis reached the rank of colonel and served in the Korean and Vietnam Wars before leaving the Army. He died at age 73 and is buried in Arlington National Cemetery, Arlington County, Virginia.

== Medal of Honor citations ==
Davis' official Medal of Honor citation reads:

For distinguishing himself conspicuously by gallantry and intrepidity at the risk of his life above and beyond the call of duty in action with the enemy on Guadalcanal Island. On January 12, 1943, Maj. Davis (then Capt.), executive officer of an infantry battalion, volunteered to carry instructions to the leading companies of his battalion which had been caught in crossfire from Japanese machine guns. With complete disregard for his own safety, he made his way to the trapped units, delivered the instructions, supervised their execution, and remained overnight in this exposed position. On the following day, Maj. Davis again volunteered to lead an assault on the Japanese position which was holding up the advance. When his rifle jammed at its first shot, he drew his pistol and, waving his men on, led the assault over the top of the hill. Electrified by this action, another body of soldiers followed and seized the hill. The capture of this position broke Japanese resistance and the battalion was then able to proceed and secure the corps objective. The courage and leadership displayed by Maj. Davis inspired the entire battalion and unquestionably led to the success of its attack.

== See also ==
- List of Medal of Honor recipients
- List of Medal of Honor recipients for World War II

== Depictions in media ==
James Jones wrote The Thin Red Line based on his experiences in Guadalcanal during the Battle of Mount Austen, the Galloping Horse, and the Sea Horse as a member of the 27th Infantry Regiment. Here Davis takes the form of Capt. John Gaff.
