= 27th Infantry Regiment (United States) =

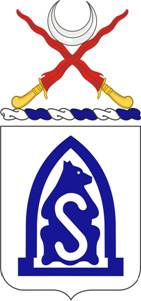
- Coat of arms
- Active: 1901–present
- Country: United States
- Branch: United States Army
- Type: Infantry
- Nickname: "Wolfhounds" (special designation)
- Mottos: Nec aspera terrent (No Fear on Earth)
- March: Wolfhound March
- Mascot: "Kolchak" A pure bred Russian wolfhound
- Anniversaries: Organization Day (Victory at the Battle of Bayan) 2 May
- Engagements: Philippine–American War; Banana Wars; Russian Civil War; Siberian Expedition; Battle of Romanovka; World War II; Battle of Pearl Harbor; Guadalcanal Campaign; New Georgia Campaign; Philippines Campaign (1944–45); Korean War; Battle of Pusan Perimeter; Battle of the Ch'ongch'on River; Third Battle of Seoul; Vietnam War; Tet Offensive; Operation Golden Pheasant; Operation Just Cause; Gulf War; Iraq War; Afghanistan War

Commanders
- Notable commanders: Charles H. Barth; Joseph D. Leitch; William H. Gill; Laurence Halstead; Edwin F. Harding; John H. Michaelis

Insignia
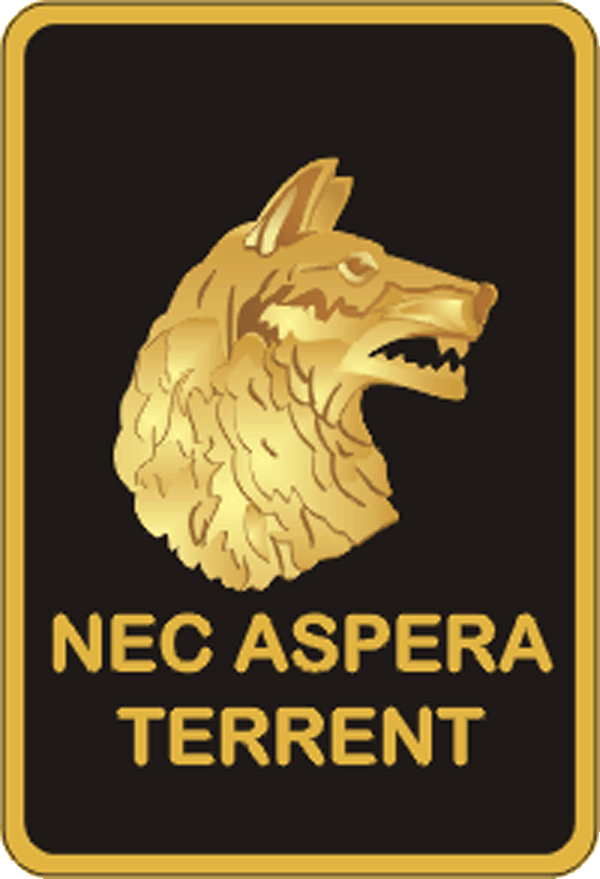
- Distinctive unit insignia

The 27th Infantry Regiment, nicknamed the "Wolfhounds", is an infantry regiment of the United States Army established in 1901, traditionally aligned with the 25th Infantry Division for more than 8 decades. It served in the Philippine–American War, in the Siberian Intervention after World War I, and as part of the 25th Infantry Division ("Tropic Lightning") during World War II, the Korean War, the Vietnam War, and later, the Iraq War.

Currently two active battalions of the regiment, the 1st and 2nd, as part of the 25th Infantry Division are stationed at Schofield Barracks, Hawaii. More recently the regiment deployed to Afghanistan for the second time, following two deployments to Iraq. The regimental march is the Wolfhound March.

== First and second formations ==
Prior to its establishment in 1901, the Wolfhound Regiment was preceded by two US Army 27th Infantry Regiments:

- 27th U.S. Infantry Regiment constituted 29 January 1813; consolidated 3 July 1815 with 4 other regiments to become 6th Infantry Regiment (United States).
- 27th U.S. Infantry Regiment constituted 3 May 1861 as 2nd Battalion/18th Infantry Regiment (United States); redesignated 27th Infantry Regiment 21 September 1866; consolidated 10 March 1869 with 9th Infantry Regiment to form 9th Infantry Regiment (United States)

== Third formation – the "Wolfhounds" ==
The 27th Infantry Regiment was established by act of Congress on 2 February 1901. James M. J. Sanno was assigned to command in August, and the regiment saw its first combat action in 1902 while serving as part of the American force sent to quell the Philippine Insurrection on the island of Mindanao.

By 1904–1905, the unit had returned from the Philippines and its battalions were stationed at Fort Sheridan (Chicago, Illinois) and Columbus Barracks (Columbus, Ohio). The 1st Battalion, 27th Infantry participated in field maneuvers with the mobilized Ohio National Guard in southeastern Ohio (near Athens, Ohio) alongside other regular army units including Troop L of the 4th Cavalry, in a test of the nationally reorganized state militias following the Dick Act of 1903. This unit was involved in the August 19, 1904 riot with Ohio National Guard and civil authorities that resulted in several deaths.

During the Russian Civil War, the 27th Infantry served in the American Expeditionary Force sent to Siberia in 1918. Under the command of Henry Delp Styer, the troops embarked on the Army transports Crook, Merritt and Warren departing Manila on 7 August 1918 and arriving in Vladivostok on 15 and 16 August. This campaign has become an integral part of the regiment's history. The tenacious pursuit tactics of the regiment won the respect of the Bolsheviks, who gave them the name "Wolfhounds." This emblem continues to serve as the symbol of the 27th Infantry Regiment. During their time in Siberia, the unit was part of the Evgenevka incident, a face-off between the Wolfhounds and the Japanese Military.

In 1920, the regiment was assigned to duty in the Philippines, and Joseph D. Leitch was assigned to command. On 1 March 1921, the 27th Infantry Regiment was assigned to the Hawaiian Division. It served in the Hawaiian Division for over twenty years until it was relieved on 26 August 1941, and assigned to the 25th Infantry Division.

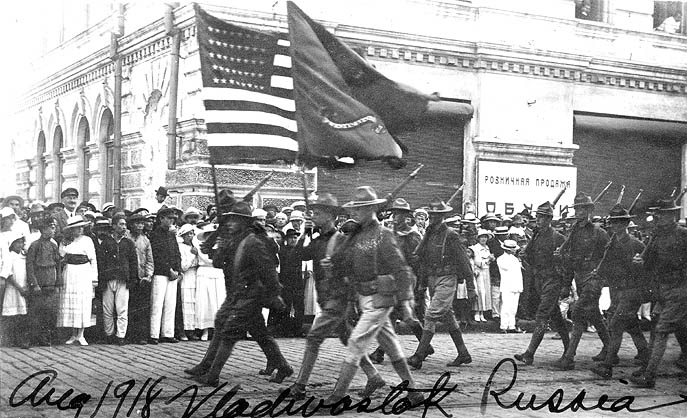
27th Infantry "Wolfhounds" on parade in Vladivostok, August 1918

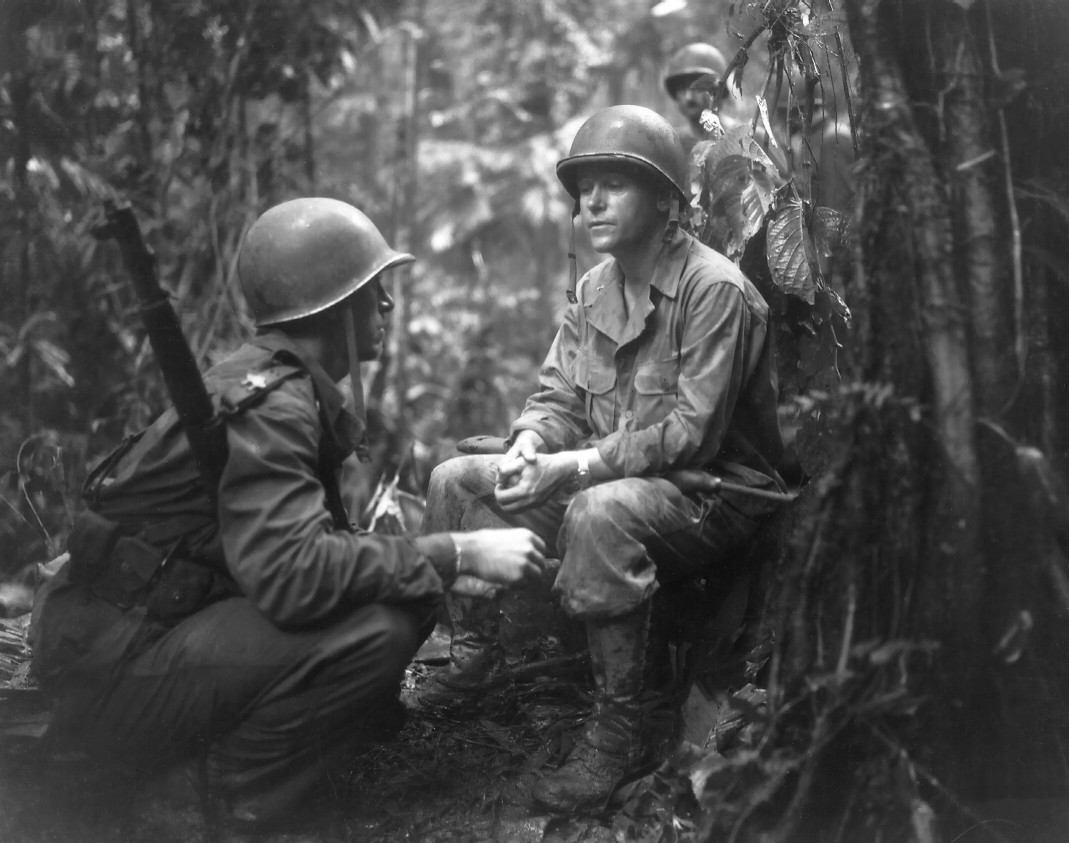
On the right, Major General J. Lawton Collins, commander of the 25th Division and, on the left, Major Charles W. Davis, commanding the 3rd Battalion, 27th Infantry Regiment confer on New Georgia, 14 August 1943.

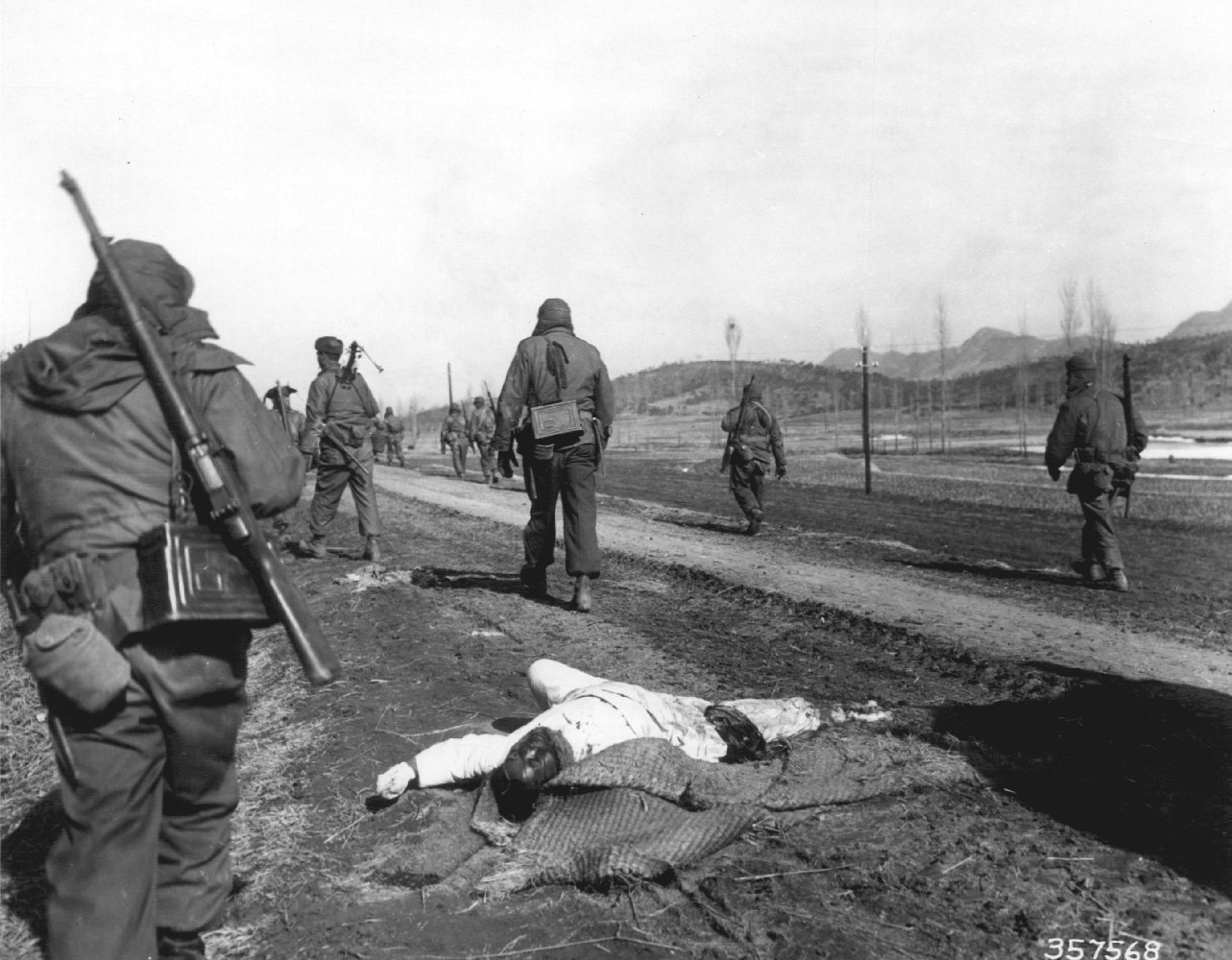
27th Infantry "Wolfhounds" advance past dead Chinese soldier, south of Seoul during Task Force 'Punch', February 1951

Stationed in Hawaii, they were some of first to fire back at attacking Japanese war planes during Japan's attack on Pearl Harbor. The film and book by James Jones From Here to Eternity was based on some of the Wolfhound regimental life. After seeing extensive action in the Pacific theater during World War II, especially on the island of Guadalcanal during the Battle of Mount Austen, the Galloping Horse, and the Sea Horse, it fought in the last days of the New Georgia Campaign on the right flank on the advance on Munda, Solomon Islands, later during the Battle of Luzon and the ensuing occupation of Japan, the 27th Infantry Regiment earned the nickname "Gentle Wolfhounds" for their support of the Holy Family Home orphanage.

Occupation duties were cut short in July 1950, when the 27th Infantry Regiment departed for Pusan, South Korea, to assist in holding the Pusan perimeter at the onset of the Korean War. The unit saw heavy action throughout the war, where they were considered the "fire brigade" for the 25th Infantry Division – in essence, making first combat contact with enemy forces. They saw significant fighting at Sandbag Castle. Colonel George B. Sloan, the commander of the 27th Infantry Regiment offered David Hackworth command of a new volunteer raider unit; Hackworth created the 27th Wolfhound Raiders and led them from August to November 1951. The 27th earned ten campaign streamers and three Presidential Unit Citations. Upon conclusion of hostilities in Korea, the unit returned to Schofield Barracks.

The 2nd Battalion, 27th Infantry Regiment, entered the Vietnam War in January 1966. During their five-year stay in Vietnam, the unit earned two valorous unit citations, and proved to be one of the last 25th Infantry Division units to return home. The regiment participated in Operation Circle Pines, Operation Junction City and fought during the Tet Offensive and the May Offensive. The regiment finally returned to Hawaii in April, 1971.

On 10 June 1987, the 2nd Battalion was relieved from their assignment to the 25th Infantry Division and assigned to the 7th Infantry Division at Fort Ord, California. During their tour at Fort Ord the 2nd and 3rd Battalions were deployed to Honduras in 1988 in support of "Operation Golden Pheasant" and in 1989 they were deployed to Panama in support of "Operation Just Cause." On 15 September 1993, the battalion was inactivated and relieved from assignment to the 7th Infantry Division.

The 2nd Battalion, 27th Infantry Regiment, was again activated on 31 August 1995, and this unit again carries its thirty battle streamers and twelve-unit citations on its colors. The motto "Nec Aspera Terrent" translates to "Frightened by no Difficulties," more literally "Not even difficulties frighten [us, them]": nec = nor, not even; aspera (nominative neuter plural noun) = rough things, adversities, difficulties; terrent (3rd person plural present tense verb) = "they (= the difficulties) frighten", from the same root as "terror". It is often stated as "No Fear on Earth," or more colloquially "Difficulties be Damned."

The 4th Battalion, 27th Infantry Regiment, was active in the 3rd Brigade, 25th Infantry Division (L) at Schofield Barracks on the island of Oahu in Hawaii during the late 1980s and early 1990s. Elements of 4th Battalion were deployed during Operation Desert Storm and served as guards for Gen. Norman Schwarzkopf during their deployment. They also participated in clearing operations in Kuwait and a security element for later peace talks. The 1st Battalion, 27th Infantry Regiment was also assigned to 3rd Brigade at the same time, but did not deploy during the First Gulf War.

== Medal of Honor recipients ==
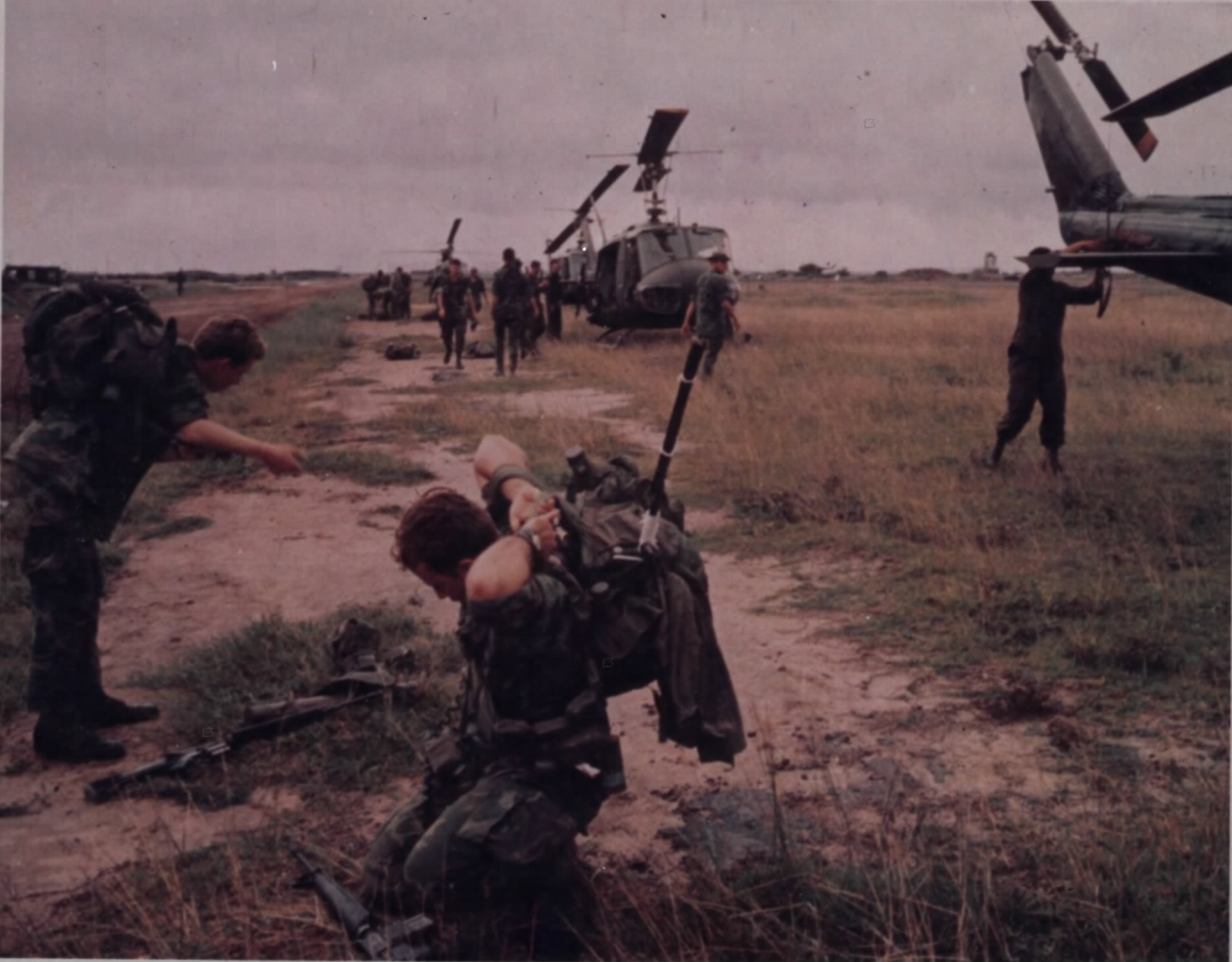
Men of the 2nd Battalion, 27th Infantry prepare to board UH-1D helicopters before a long range reconnaissance patrol, 18 August 1970

Philippine–American War Medal of Honor recipients include:

- Charles G. Bickham, 1st Lieutenant, 27th IN
- George C. Shaw, Brigadier General (Then 1st Lt.), 27th IN

World War II Medal of Honor recipients include:

- Charles W. Davis, Captain, 2nd Battalion's executive officer, 27th IN
- Raymond H. Cooley, Staff Sergeant, Company B, 27th IN

Korean War Medal of Honor recipients include:

- John W. Collier, Corporal, Company C, 27th IN
- Reginald B. Desiderio, Captain, Company E, 27th IN
- Benito Martinez, Corporal, Company A, 27th IN
- Lewis L. Millett, Captain, Company E, 27th IN
- Jerome A. Sudut, Second Lieutenant, Company B, 27th IN

Vietnam War Medal of Honor recipients include:

- John F. Baker, Jr., Sergeant (Then Pfc.), Company A, 2nd Battalion, 27th IN
- Charles C. Fleek, Sergeant, Company C, 1st Battalion, 27th IN
- Robert F. Foley, Captain, Company A, 2nd Battalion, 27th IN
- Paul R. Lambers, Staff Sergeant, Company A, 2nd Battalion, 27th IN
- Riley L. Pitts, Captain, Company C, 2nd Battalion, 27th IN

== Regimental distinctive insignia ==
The 27th Infantry Regiment currently consists of two battalions; the 1/27 and 2/27. While some might believe that there are actually two separate distinctive unit insignia (DUI), one for the 1st Battalion wolfhound unit crest which has the wolfhound facing to the left and 2nd Battalion wolfhound crest has the wolfhound facing to the right on the crest, the wolfhound crests are issued in pairs. While in a Class A uniform a coordinated pair of the two different crests is worn, one on each shoulder with the motto toward the shoulder seam and the head of the wolfhound facing forward.

== Charitable activities ==
Both battalions of the 27th Infantry have entered the 71st year of the regiment's relationship with the children and staff of the Holy Family Home Orphanage, Osaka, Japan. During Christmas 1949, Wolfhounds visited the orphanage to deliver gifts and hold a Christmas party for the children. Recognizing the needs of the children, and the then-limited capacity for self-help in postwar Japan, the regiment turned what was to have been a one-time occurrence into flow of supplies, food, building materials, and medical assistance from American soldiers and their families to the orphans. Soldiers from 1st and 2nd Battalions return to Japan every Christmas, and two children from the orphanage have visited Schofield Barracks annually since 1957. The relationship was recognized by Hollywood in 1956 when members of the regiment were profiled in the 1955 film, Three Stripes in the Sun, starring Aldo Ray.

== Battalion commanders ==
- 1st Battalion
  - 2024- Present LTC Teddy Borawski
  - 2022–2024 LTC Ryan M. Case
  - 2020–2022 LTC Eric B. Alexander
  - 2018–2020 LTC Lou Kangas
  - 2016–2018 LTC Val Bernat
  - 2014–2016 LTC Neal Mayo (Transition back to Light Infantry)
  - 2012–2014 LTC Charles Bergman
  - 2011–2012 LTC Todd Fox
  - 2009–2011 LTC Brown
  - 2006–2009 LTC Rich "Flip" Wilson (Strykers)
  - 2005–2006 LTC Bryan Lee Rudacille (Transition to Strykers)
  - 2002–2005 LTC C. Scott Leith
  - 2000–2002 LTC Billy J. Buckner
  - 1998–2000 LTC William B. Garrett III
  - 1996–1998 LTC Bernard Champoux
  - 1995–1996 LTC Kenneth R Curley
  - 1993–1995 LTC Daniel Fey
  - 1991–1993 LTC Paul Herbert
  - 1989–1991 LTC Roland Carter
  - 1985–1987 LTC David A Crittenden (Transition to Light Infantry)
  - 1982–1985 LTC Howard Thacher Linke
  - 1981–1982 LTC William Petersen
  - 1979–1981 LTC Fred Peters
- 2nd Battalion
  - 2022–present LTC Pete Leszczynski
  - 2020–2022 LTC Michael C. Haith
  - 2018–2020 LTC Matthew D. Lee
  - 2016–2018 LTC Glen T. Helberg
  - 2014–2016 LTC Kevin J. Williams
  - 2012–2014 LTC Barrett M. Bernard
  - 2010–2012 LTC Daniel Wilson
  - 2008–2010 LTC Raul E. Gonzalez
  - 2005–2008 LTC Drew Meyerowich
  - 2003–2005 LTC Walter E. Piatt
  - 2001–2003 LTC Tom Guthrie
  - 1999–2001 LTC Chelsea Y. Chae
  - 1997–1999 LTC Jon Smart
  - 1996–1997 LTC Greg Lynch
  - 1991–1993 LTC Randy Glass
  - 1988–1991 LTC Alan J. Rock
  - 1986–1988 LTC Joe Trez
  - 1984–1986 LTC Edward Chamberlain
- 3rd Battalion
  - 1991–1993 LTC William R. Phillips (previously Executive Officer of 3rd Battalion and S3 and XO of 2nd Brigade, 7th Infantry Division (Light)
  - 1989–1991 LTC Scott Hutchison
  - 1989–1990 Col Lynwood Burney (Cold Steel) Note – Col Burney was 2nd Brigade Cdr 7th ID (Light) which consisted of 2/27, 3/27, and 5/21
  - 1987–1989 LTC Joseph Hunt
- 4th Battalion (inactive)
  - 1995–1996 LTC Greg Lynch (Battalion Reflagged from 4th Battalion to 2nd Battalion in 1996)
  - 1993–1995 LTC William B. Caldwell IV
  - 1991–1993 LTC Danny R. McKnight
  - 1989–1991 LTC Michael A. Thompson

== Campaign credits ==
Philippine Insurrection: Mindanao

World War I: Siberia 1918; Siberia 1919

World War II: Central Pacific; Guadalcanal; Northern Solomons (with arrowhead); Luzon

Korean War: UN Defensive; UN Offensive; CCF Intervention; First UN Counteroffensive; CCF Spring Offensive; UN Summer–Fall Offensive; Second Korean Winter; Korea, Summer–Fall 1952; Third Korean Winter; Korea, Summer 1953

Vietnam: Counteroffensive; Counteroffensive, Phase II; Counteroffensive, Phase III; Tet Counteroffensive; Counteroffensive, Phase IV; Counteroffensive, Phase V; Counteroffensive, Phase VI; Tet 69/Counteroffensive; Summer–Fall 1969; Winter–Spring 1970; Sanctuary Counteroffensive; Counteroffensive, Phase VII

Armed Forces Expeditions: Panama

== Decorations ==
- Presidential Unit Citation (Army) for SANGNYONG-NI
- Presidential Unit Citation (Army) for TAEGU
- Presidential Unit Citation (Army) for HAN RIVER
- Presidential Unit Citation (Army) for 19 July 1966
- Valorous Unit Award for CU CHI DISTRICT
- Valorous Unit Award for SAIGON
- Philippine Presidential Unit Citation for 17 OCTOBER 1944 TO 4 JULY 1945
- Republic of Korea Presidential Unit Citation for MASAN-CHINJU
- Republic of Korea Presidential Unit Citation for MUNSAN-NI
- Republic of Korea Presidential Unit Citation for KOREA
- Joint Meritorious Unit Award CJTF-7 Baghdad, Iraq 2004-2005
- Meritorious Unit Award 2nd BCT, 25th Infantry Division 2004-2005
- Meritorious Unit Award Operation Iraqi Freedom 2006-2007
- Meritorious Unit Award Operation Iraqi Freedom 2008-2009
- Valorous Unit Award Operation Enduring Freedom 2011–2012
- Meritorious Unit Commendation (2nd BN) Afghanistan 1 March 04-1 April 05

== Depictions in media ==
James Jones wrote From Here to Eternity and The Thin Red Line based on his experiences in Schofield Barracks, Hawaii during the Attack of Pearl Harbor and Guadalcanal during the Battle of Mount Austen, the Galloping Horse, and the Sea Horse as a member of the 27th Infantry Regiment.

The movie Three Stripes in the Sun (1955) is based on the New Yorker magazine article "The Gentle Wolfhound" by Ely Jacques Kahn, Jr.

The movie "Lord of War" has a scene where a fascist soldier depicts the 27th Infantry Regiment crest on his beret while talking to Yuri Orlov.
