= Milt Herth =

American jazz organist (1902–1989)

Milton Herth
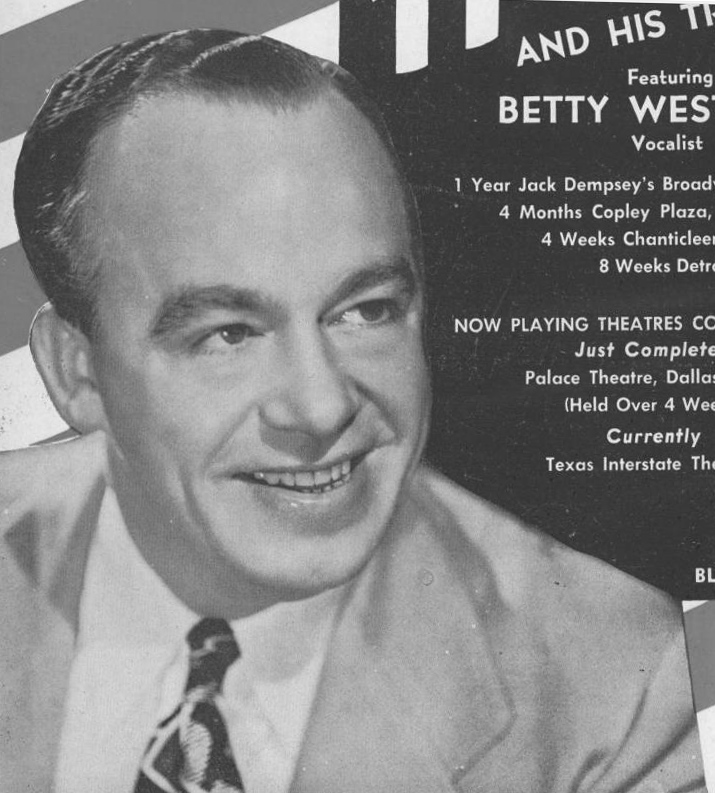

Background information
- Born: November 3, 1902; Kenosha, Wisconsin, U.S.
- Origin: Chicago, Illinois
- Died: June 18, 1969 (aged 66) Las Vegas, Nevada
- Genres: Jazz
- Occupation: Musician
- Instrument: Organ
- Labels: Decca, Capitol

Milton "Milt" Herth (November 3, 1902 – June 18, 1969) was an American jazz organist, known for his work on the Hammond organ soon after it was introduced in 1935. Herth's work is available from his recordings of the 1930s and 1940s.

== Biography ==
Herth was born in Kenosha, Wisconsin,

In 1937, Herth began to work with jazz pianist Willie "The Lion" Smith in Chicago, when Smith was signed to Decca Records. Herth, Smith, and drummer O'Neil Spencer formed the Milt Herth Trio. The trio became a quartet with the addition of Teddy Bunn on guitar in April 1938.

Herth appeared as himself in several short films (Love and Onions (1935), Swing Styles (1939), and Jingle Belles, (1941)) and the longer 1942 film, Juke Box Jenny, a movie noted for being a series of musical performances.

He died in Las Vegas, Nevada on June 18, 1969.

== Discography ==
- The Monkeys Have No Tails in Pago Pago (Decca, 1939)
- Ain't She Sweet (Coral)
- Hi-Jinks on the Hammond (Capitol)
- Milt Herth Trio (Decca)
