= Yoram Harth =

Israeli dermatologist and inventor (born 1958)

- יורם הרט
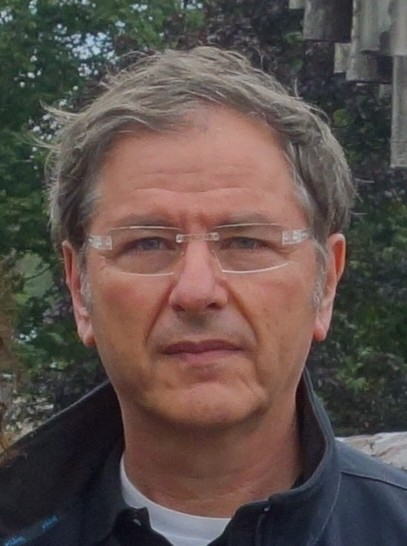
- Born: August 27, 1958 (age 68)
- Known for: dermatologist, inventor

Yoram Harth (Hebrew: יורם הרט; born 27 August 1958) is an Israeli dermatologist and inventor.

== Biography ==
Yoram Harth's father was a physician who specialised in internal medicine. Harth is a magna cum laude graduate of the Sackler School of Medicine in Tel Aviv University (1982). Harth received his Dermatology training in the department of Dermatology at Rambam Medical School in Haifa and served as a research fellow in the department of Dermatology at the Columbia – Presbyterian Medical center in New York City.

He co-founded the Phototherapy Unit, Rambam Medical center, and was Director of the Photodynamic Therapy Unit, Elisha Medical Center in Haifa. Harth served on the faculty of American Academy of Dermatology (AAD) as part of the Photobiology training team and the American Society for Laser Medicine and Surgery (ASLMS).

He was involved in the development of blue light phototherapy for the treatment of acne vulgaris, as well as a radio frequency device intended for at-home wrinkle reduction.

In 2007 Harth co-founded Endymed Medical and Israeli company specializing in multisource radiofrequency devices for the professional and home use markets. The device won the Edison Product innovation award for 2013.

In 2017, Harth co-founded, with his son, Oded Harth, MDalgrithms, a company that uses computer vision and deep learning technologies to help people with acne (MDacne) and Hair loss (MDhair).
