= Vicente Álvarez (general) =

Filipino revolutionary in Zamboanga (1862–1942)

1st President of the Republic of Zamboanga
- In office May 18, 1899 – November 16, 1899
- Preceded by: Post established
- Succeeded by: Isidro Medel

Personal details
- Born: Vicente Álvarez y Solís; April 5, 1862 Magay, Zamboanga, Captaincy General of the Philippines
- Died: November 22, 1942 (aged 80) Labason, Zamboanga, Philippine Commonwealth

General Vicente Álvarez y Solís (Spanish: [ˈbiˈsente ˈalβaɾes] : April 5, 1862 – November 22, 1942) was a Zamboangueño revolutionary general who led the revolution in Zamboanga which forced the surrender of the last Spanish Governor-General of the Philippines, Diego de los Rios, effectively ending the Spanish occupation in the Philippines.

== Early life ==
Vicente Álvarez Solís was born on April 20, 1862, as the fifth child to Don Alejandro Álvarez and Doña Isidora Solís in Magay, Zamboanga.

Álvarez studied his elementary course at the Liceo de Zamboanga inside Fort Pilar. When the Spanish government granted him scholarship due to his father's influence, he pursued his military studies at the Spanish Military Academy in Manila. When the academy was closed down, he transferred to the Ateneo Municipal de Manila to which he graduated with a bachelor's degree.

== Career ==
=== Malacañang Service ===
Álvarez was later assigned to the Malacañang Palace to serve under the Governor-General of the Philippines in which he rose to the number-two position in the administrative staff as segundo official mayor.

During his service for the Governor-General, he joined the Katipunan when it was established in 1892. He then used his position to pass valuable information to the Katipunan. However, his membership was discovered when the Philippine Revolution erupted in 1896. As a result of his treason, he could have been executed or imprisoned but due to his father's influence, he was punished by sending him into a mission in Sulu to pacify a quarrel between two claimants to the throne of the Sultanate and invite them to join the Spanish Crown.

Because of his hard work of diplomacy, in 1898, the dispute was quickly agreed on a compromise and the new sultan recognized Álvarez's judgment and authority. The Sultan designated him the title Datu Tumanggung or "royal marshall of camp", the first Christian ever to attain the honor and giving him jurisdiction over the constituents of the Sultan in Basilan and Zamboanga. To mark the joyous event, a royal festival was held to which the Sultan gave Sitti Jumlia as bride to Alvarez.

There were conflicting accounts to which what happened to Alvarez after his mission in Sulu:

- According to Ronaldo Bautista, Alvarez, instead of convincing the royal houses of Sulu to pledge allegiance to Spain, invited them to organize a revolution against the Spaniards. Thus, instead of returning to Manila to report to the Spanish Government, he proceeded to Zamboanga to organize a revolutionary army.
- According to Dr. Hermenegildo Malcampo, Alvarez, after his success in Sulu, returned to Manila to report of his accomplishment in which he was pardoned by the Spanish Governor-General. He then returned home to organize his revolutionary army to topple the Spanish government in Zamboanga.

=== Zamboanga Revolution ===
In 1898, prominent Zamboangueños organized a revolutionary group to fight the Spanish that remained in Zamboanga. The council then elected Álvarez as their commanding general. He then organized an army of Christians, Muslims, and Lumads.

Alvarez, as commander in-chief, appointed his following commanders to the towns around Zamboanga:

- Mariano Arquiza – Sta. Maria
- Isidoro Midel – Tetuan
- Fruto Bucoy – Ayala
- Laureano Alfaro – Mercedes
- Melanio Calixto – aide-de-camp to General Alvarez

Under his leadership, Álvarez was able to take control of the peninsula, except the port of Zamboanga and Fort Pilar, which were fortified by remaining Spanish forces led by Governor-General Diego de los Ríos who fled from Iloilo, which was then the capital of the Spanish East Indies after Manila fell to the Americans.

After organizing enough troops, guns and ammunition, he invaded Zamboanga and engaged the Spaniards in fierce fighting. Fightings continued, consisting chiefly of artillery duels across the town and after two weeks of stalemate, General Alvarez laid siege against the Spanish stronghold of Fort Pilar in April 1899. The siege lasted a month, until May, in which the Spanish were compelled to wave the white flag. On May 18, Fort Pilar, the seat of Spanish sovereignty in southern Philippines, was surrendered to the Revolutionary Government of Zamboanga.

=== Republic of Zamboanga ===
General Álvarez then proclaimed establishment of the Republic of Zamboanga with him as its first president.

A few days before the Spanish fall, two ships boarded an American expeditionary force steamed into the Zamboanga port. Intense bombardment from the fort prevented the Americans to land. Alvarez, at the time, was attempting to recruit more troops to his army to fight the Americans.

Alvarez was even offered a sum of 75,000 Mexican dollars to turn over Zamboanga to the Americans but he turned it down. He already placed his aide-de-camp, Colonel Melanio Calixto to be acting commander of the Zamboanga revolutionary force.

However, all ended in treachery. Colonel Calixto was assassinated by the supposed orders of the commander of Tetuan, Isidio Midel. Midel, who had allied with the occupying Americans, opened the doors of Fort Pilar to the Americans. Álvarez tried regrouping his men but it was too late. On November 16, 1899, Zamboanga was officially under American hands and Midel took over the presidency, which became a protectorate under the United States.

Alvarez, betrayed, did not stopped his resolve to fight back. He then resorted to guerilla warfare and took defense of Mercedes, north of Zamboanga. The Americans, frustrated that they were unable to capture Alvarez resorted to dirty tactics in which they poisoned the water supplies of the rebels which delivered a heavy blow to the revolutionary ranks. Alvarez, in order to save lives from the Americans, fled to Basilan then to Misamis Occidental to continue the Revolution against the Americans.

He was later captured by the Americans in 1902 and sent to Manila to be imprisoned.

== Post-war career ==
Upon recognizing American sovereignty, Álvarez was then commissioned to head the Mindanao delegation to the 1904 International Exposition held in the St. Louis, United States and was promoted to the rank of captain in the Philippine Constabulary, said to be the highest rank given to a Filipino at that time.

In 1906, he was assigned to pacify Datu Ali of Cotabato and Salip Akil of Basilan in which he succeeded since his peace campaign in the Sulu archipelago before the War.

He would be later appointed as judge of the Dapitan Tribal Ward and later as its District Governor.

He became Vice-Governor of the Zamboanga District under the Department of Mindanao and Sulu until his retirement in 1917 and was given life pension by the government.

== Legacy ==
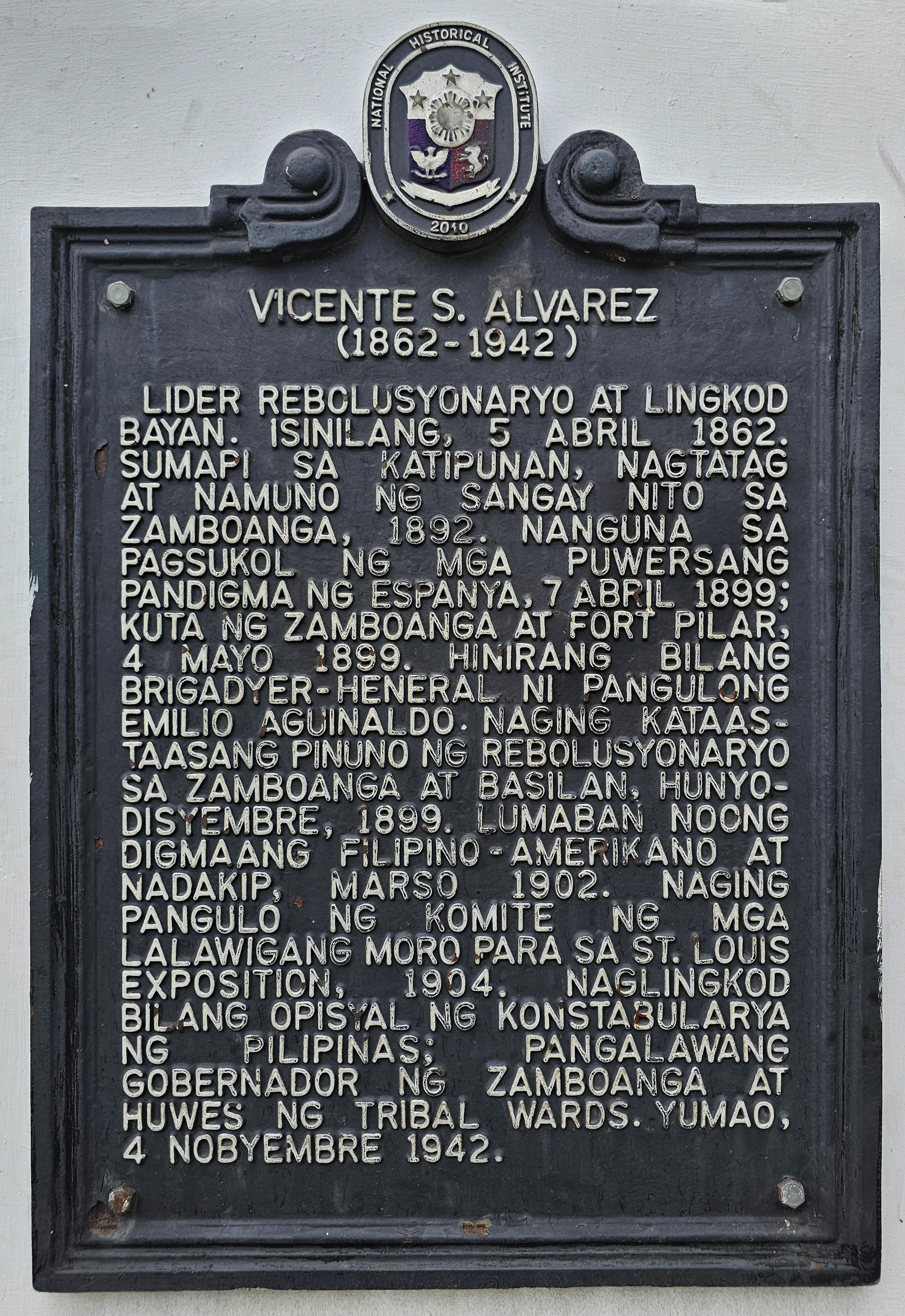
National historical marker installed in 2010 at the namesake Plaza Alvarez in the downtown area of Zamboanga City

Vicente Álvarez died in Labason, Zamboanga del Norte on November 4, 1942, leaving a legacy as revolutionary leader who fought foreign occupation in Zamboanga and in the Philippines. He is responsible for the true and last surrender of the Spanish forces in Las Islas Filipinas to the Zamboangueño revolutionary forces.

For a brief period of an uninterrupted six months of sovereignty, the Republic of Zamboanga remained supreme that the sovereignty of Spain over the remaining portions of the Philippines have been transferred to it by virtue of conquest. Having had a duly constituted government and territorial control over its constituents, its sovereignty was absolute, if not over the entire Philippines, at least in Mindanao.

Shortly before his death, he apparently spoke out against the Japanese occupation in the Philippines.

In strong words he repeatedly said, "We will never surrender Zamboanga and we will fight any foreign invader to the last man."

In recognition for his heroism and contribution to Zamboanga, the Zamboanga City Council approved Ordinance 213 declaring Alvarez as Zamboanga's revolutionary hero. A busy street is named after him at downtown Zamboanga.

On July 3, 2008, the Zamboanga City Council approved City Ordinance 334 declaring May 18 of every year as Dia de General Vicente Alvarez and naming Plaza Roma, situated at the corner of Don Pablo Lorenzo St., Zaragoza St. and Gen. V. Alvarez St., as Plaza Vicente S. Alvarez.

== See also ==
- Republic of Zamboanga
- Zamboanga City
- Siege of Zamboanga
