= The Monkeys Have No Tails in Zamboanga =

U.S. military marching song

"The Monkeys Have No Tails in Zamboanga" (Roud 12598) is a song, probably written during the Philippine–American War or the Moro Rebellion. It was popular with U.S. soldiers in the Pacific in World War II.

== History ==
"The Monkeys Have No Tails in Zamboanga" is the official regimental march of the 27th Infantry Regiment, as the "Wolfhound March". The lyrics of this official version were written in 1907 in Cuba by G. Savoca, the regimental band leader (died 1912), after the regiment was formed in 1901 to serve in the Philippines. According to Harry McClintock, the tune was borrowed from an official march of the Philippine Constabulary Band, as played at the St. Louis Exposition in 1904. One version was collected as part of the Gordon "Inferno" Collection. As with many folk songs with military origins (such as "Mademoiselle from Armentières" from World War I), the song becomes a souvenir of the campaign for those who served.

== Lyrics ==
Oh, the monkeys have no tails in Zamboanga,
Oh, the monkeys have no tails in Zamboanga,
Oh, the monkeys have no tails,
They were bitten off by whales,
Oh, the monkeys have no tails in Zamboanga.

Chorus:
Oh, we won't go back to Subic anymore,
Oh, we won't go back to Subic anymore,
Oh, we won't go back to Subic
Where they mix our wine with tubig, (Note: tubig is the Filipino word for water)
Oh, we won't go back to Subic anymore.

Chorus

Oh, the carabao have no hair in Mindanao,
Oh, the carabao have no hair in Mindanao,
Oh, the carabao have no hair,
Holy smoke! But they are bare,
Oh, the carabao have no hair in Mindanao.

Chorus

Oh, the fishes wear no skirts in Iloilo,
Oh, the fishes wear no skirts in Iloilo,
Oh, the fishes wear no skirts,
But they all have undershirts,
Oh, the fishes wear no skirts in Iloilo.

Chorus

They grow potatoes small in Iloilo,
They grow potatoes small in Iloilo,
They grow potatoes small,
And they eat them skins and all,
They grow potatoes small in Iloilo.

Chorus

Oh, the birdies have no feet in Mariveles,
Oh, the birdies have no feet in Mariveles,
Oh, the birdies have no feet,
They were burned off by the heat,
Oh, the birdies have no feet in Mariveles.

Chorus

Oh, we'll all go up to China in the spring time,
Oh, we'll all go up to China in the spring time,
Oh, we'll hop aboard a liner,
I can think of nothing finer,
Oh, we'll all go up to China in the spring time.

Chorus

Oh, we'll all go down to Shanghai in the fall,
Oh, we'll all go down to Shanghai in the fall,
Oh, we'll all get down to Shanghai,
Those champagne corks will bang high,
Oh, we'll all go down to Shanghai in the fall.

Chorus

Oh, we lived ten thousand years in old Chefoo.
Oh, we lived ten thousand years in old Chefoo.
And it didn't smell like roses,
So we had to hold our noses,
Oh, we lived ten thousand years in old Chefoo.

Some verses were updated and sung by U.S. Army and Navy personnel and families in Manila, Philippines, and back in the States after World War II. The song mentions islands in the Philippine chain, attributing amusing or unflattering characteristics to their flora and fauna, and humans. As there are many islands, there are no doubt many more verses.

Oh, the ladies wear no teddies in Manila,
Oh, the ladies wear no teddies in Manila,
Oh, the ladies wear no teddies,
They're a bunch of ever-readies,
Oh, the ladies wear no teddies in Manila.

Oh, the men they wear no pants on Luzon,
Oh, the men they wear no pants on Luzon,
Oh, the men they wear no pants,
They're afraid to miss a chance,
Oh, the men they wear no pants on Luzon.

== Recorded versions ==
- Two jazz versions were recorded in 1939, as "The Monkeys Have No Tails in Pago Pago". By Abe Lyman 8-29-1939, (Bluebird 10321) and by the Milt Herth Trio 10-19-1939 (DECCA 2964A)
- Harry McClintock recorded a version under the title "Subic" on Haywire Mac, Cook Records, 1950
- An orchestral version is the B-side of the film tie-in single of The High and the Mighty.
- Oscar Brand as "Zamboanga" on Sing-Along Bawdy Songs & Backroom Ballads (1956) and Every Inch a Sailor (1960), and on the compilation Four Albums of Military Song from Oscar Brand (2006)
- Sailorman Jack (cassette release, c. 1986)

== Cinema and television ==
- Hell Divers (1931), sung by Wallace Beery
- Night Waitress (1936), in which it is attributed to Don Raye, Vic Schoen, Jerry Seelen and Hy Zaret
- They Were Expendable (1945), directed by John Ford
- It was sung by "the Beaver" in the TV series Leave It to Beaver in Season 1 Episode 20, "Lonesome Beaver" (1958)
- A Hole in the Head (1959), directed by Frank Capra
- Donovan's Reef (1963), directed by John Ford, starring Lee Marvin and John Wayne
- The Virgin Suicides (1999)

== Literary use ==
- Two published books share their title with the song, one by S.P. Meek (1935) and one by Reese Wolfe (1959)
- The song is mentioned in Kemp Tolley’s Yangtze Patrol as a popular “Far East ditty” that describes the Asiatic Fleets route from Manila to Tsingtao during the summer.

== Related songs and parody versions ==
- "No te vayas de Zamboanga" a Chavacano song written by Juan Cuadrado, Sr. Later spawned the English song Zamboanga, popular with Filipinos with the following lyrics "Don't you go, don't you go too far Zamboanga." (a variant)
- The song later became a Philippine brass band favorite in both civilian and military bands. One YouTube sample by a local Philippine band The Malabon Brass Band:
- The Freshmen Up at Yale Get No Tail
- Communist Party organizers Joseph and Esther Gelders performed the song, as well as a version entitled "The Workers Have No Vote In Alabama" for ethnomusicologist Alan Lomax in 1937.
