= Fort Pilar =

- Real Fuerte de Nuestra Señora del Pilar de Zaragoza
- Top: Entrance portal in 2026, Bottom: Marian shrine in 2023

- Location within Philippines Location within Mindanao mainland
- Former names: Real Fuerte de San José (Royal Fort of Saint Joseph)
- Alternative names: Fortaleza del Pilar

General information
- Type: Fortification
- Architectural style: Bastioned fort
- Location: N.S. Valderosa Street, Zamboanga City, Philippines
- Coordinates: 6°54′4″N 122°4′56″E
- Current tenants: National Museum of the Philippines
- Groundbreaking: June 23, 1635
- Owner: Philippine Government

Technical details
- Structural system: Masonry

Design and construction
- Architects: Father Melchor de Vera (1635); Juan Sicarra (1718)

The Real Fuerte de Nuestra Señora del Pilar de Zaragoza (Royal Fort of Our Lady of the Pillar of Saragossa), also known as Fort Pilar, is a 17th-century military defense fortress built by the Spanish colonial government in Zamboanga City. The fort, which is now a regional museum of the National Museum of the Philippines, is a major landmark of the city and it symbolizes the city's cultural heritage.

Outside the eastern wall is a Marian shrine dedicated to Our Lady of the Pillar, the city patroness, pontifically crowned on 12 October 1960 following a papal decree on 18 September 1960.

== History ==
=== Spanish colonial period ===
==== Establishment ====
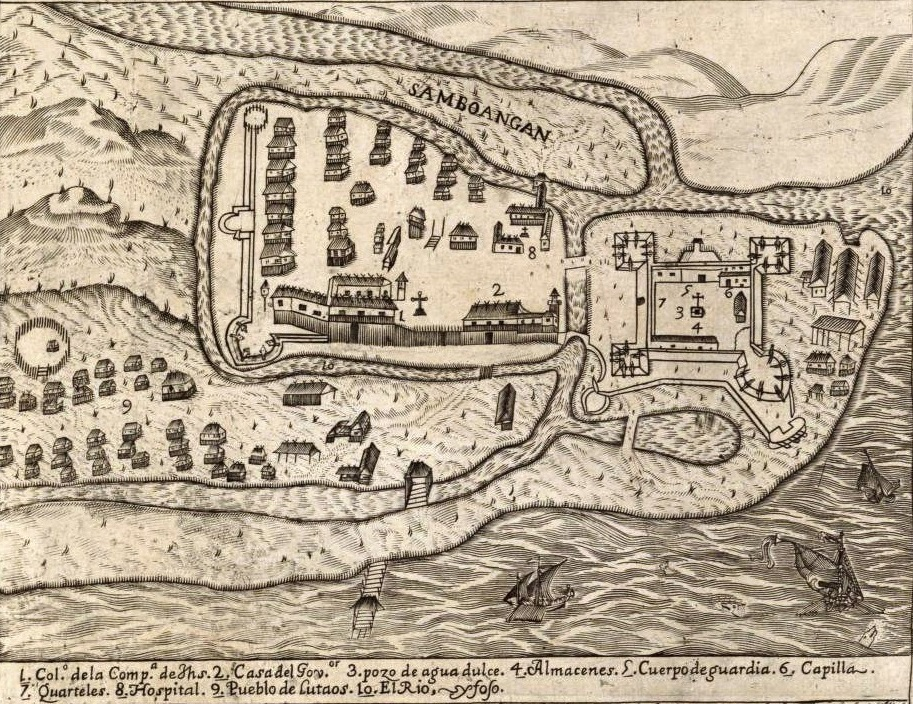
Illustration of Zamboanga and Fort Pilar, detail from the Carta Hydrographica y Chorographica de las Yslas Filipinas, 1734

In 1635, upon the requests of the Jesuit missionaries and Bishop Fray Pedro of Cebu, the Spanish governor of the Philippines Juan Cerezo de Salamanca (1633–1635) approved the building of a stone fort in defense against pirates and raiders from the sultanates of Maguindanao and Sulu. The cornerstone of the fort, originally called Real Fuerte de San José ("Royal Fort of Saint Joseph"), was laid by Melchor de Vera, a Jesuit priest-engineer, on June 23, 1635, which also marks the founding of Zamboanga as a city.

The construction of the early fort continued under the Governor-General Sebastián Hurtado de Corcuera (1635–1644), previously governor of Panama. Insufficient manpower drove the import of laborers from Cavite, Cebu, Bohol, and Panay to help the Spaniards, Mexicans and Peruvians in construction of the fort. This period also marks the emergence of Zamboangueño Chavacano as a pidgin that eventually developed into a full-fledged creole language.

==== Early attacks ====
Fort San José was attacked by the Dutch Republic in 1646, and was later abandoned by Spanish troops who went back to Manila in 1662 to help fight the Chinese pirate Koxinga who had earlier defeated Dutch forced. In 1669, the Jesuit missionaries rebuilt the fort after pirates and raiders had again destroyed it.

In 1718–1719, it was rebuilt by Spaniard engineer Juan Sicarra upon the orders of Governor-General Fernando Manuel de Bustillo Bustamante y Rueda and was renamed Real Fuerte de Nuestra Señora del Pilar de Zaragoza ("Royal Fort of Our Lady of the Pillar of Zaragoza"), after the Blessed Virgin Mary’s title as patroness of Spain. A year later, King Dalasi of Bulig and 3,000 Moro pirates attacked the fort; the defenders repulsed the attack.

In 1798 the British Royal Navy bombarded the fort but again it proved robust enough to repel the attack. Fort Pilar was the scene of a mutiny by 70 prisoners in 1872.

==== Marian apparitions ====
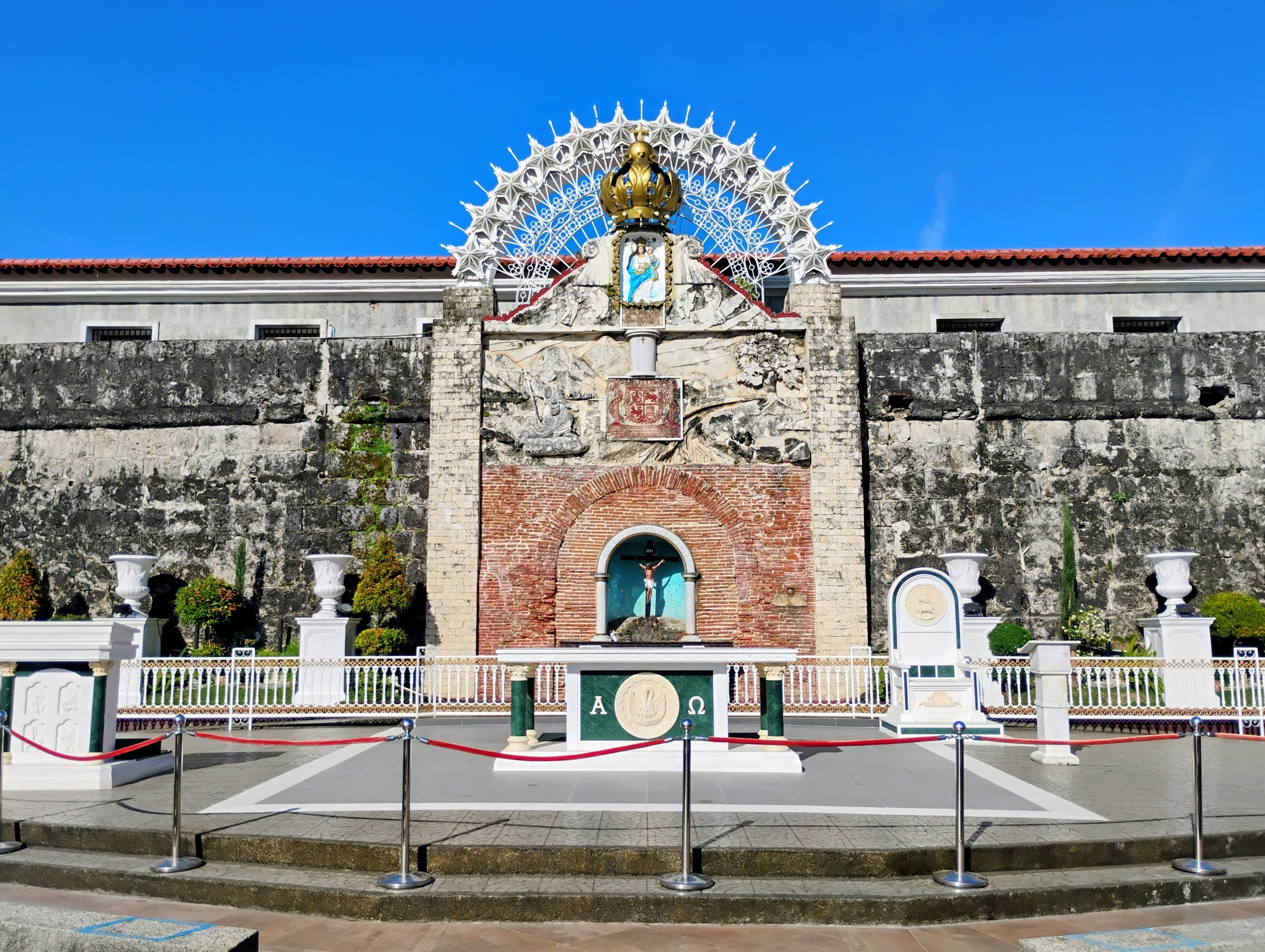
The venerated bas relief of Our Lady of the Pillar

It was in 1734 when a relief of Our Lady of the Pillar was set above the eastern wall of the fort, making it an outdoor shrine with an altar. According to tradition, the Blessed Virgin Mary appeared to a soldier on December 6, 1734, at the city gate. The soldier asked her to stop, but upon recognizing her the man fell to his knees.

A similar but distinct narrative is described by American Captain John H. McGee, who relayed the story he heard while training soldiers at Fort Pilar, then called Pettit Barracks. According to that version, while Dutch ships were besieging the fort, the Blessed Virgin Mary appeared to a Spanish soldier and "assured him victory if the beleaguered garrison held out." Accordingly, the shrine was built in commemoration of that event. It is unsure whether the Dutch attacks mentioend referred to the 1646-1648 Dutch attempts to take the fort.

At 1:14 PM on September 21, 1897, a strong earthquake struck the western region of Mindanao. The Virgin Mary allegedly appeared, and according to visionaries, she was midair over the Basilan Strait. She had her right hand raised to command the onrushing waves to stop, thus saving the city from a tsunami. When another another tsunami-causing earthquake struck the Moro Gulf at midnight on August 19, 1976, Mary was allegedly "once again seen over the sea, protecting people from the disaster."

=== American colonial period ===
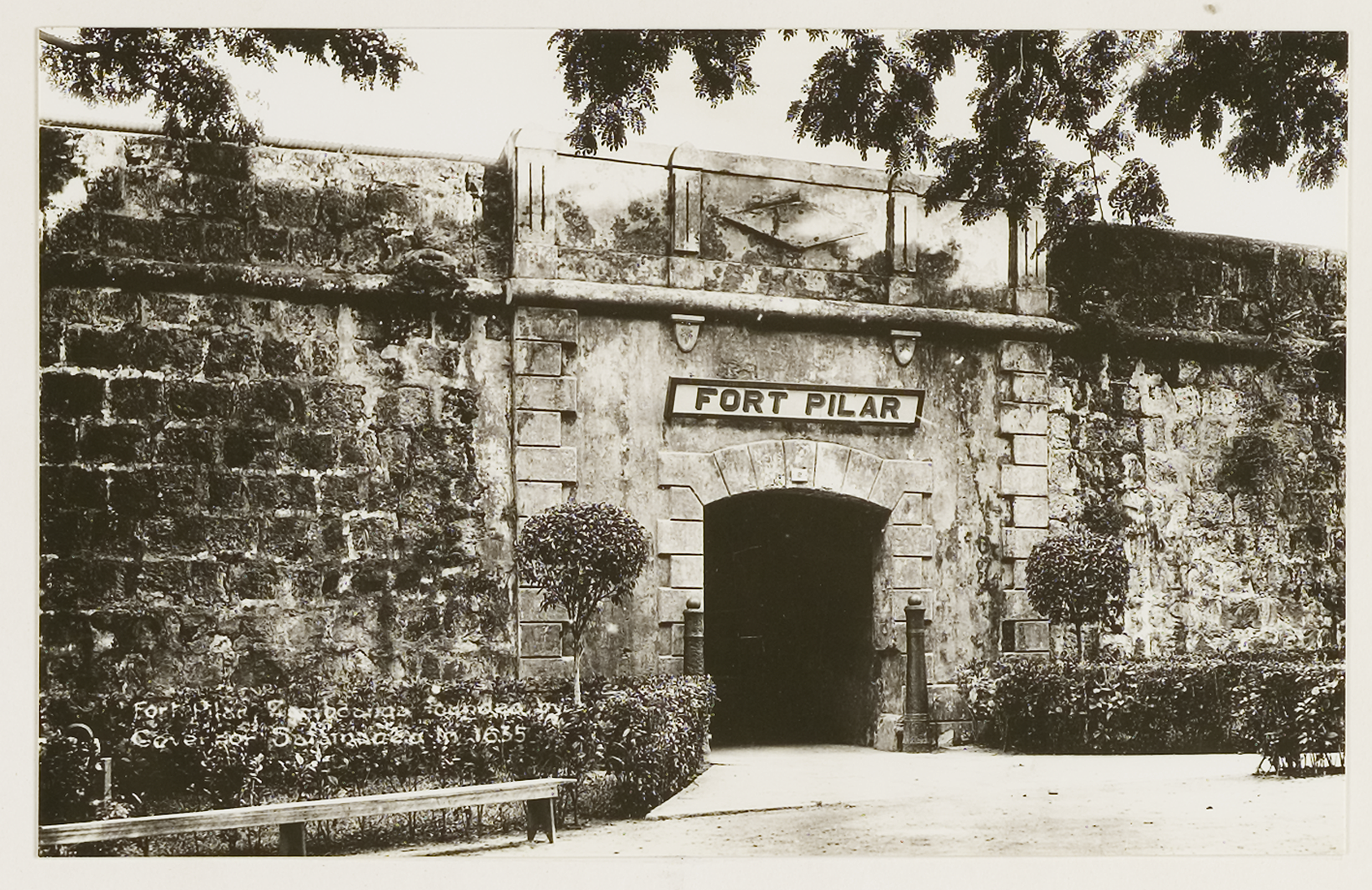
Fort Pilar, circa pre-1930

Following the Spanish–American War, Fort Pilar and its Spanish troops surrendered to the Revolutionary Government of Zamboanga on May 18, 1899, under General Vicente Álvarez, a Zamboangueño, at the onset of the Philippine Revolution against Spain. On November 19, 1899, the fort was captured by U.S. expeditionary forces.

=== World War II ===
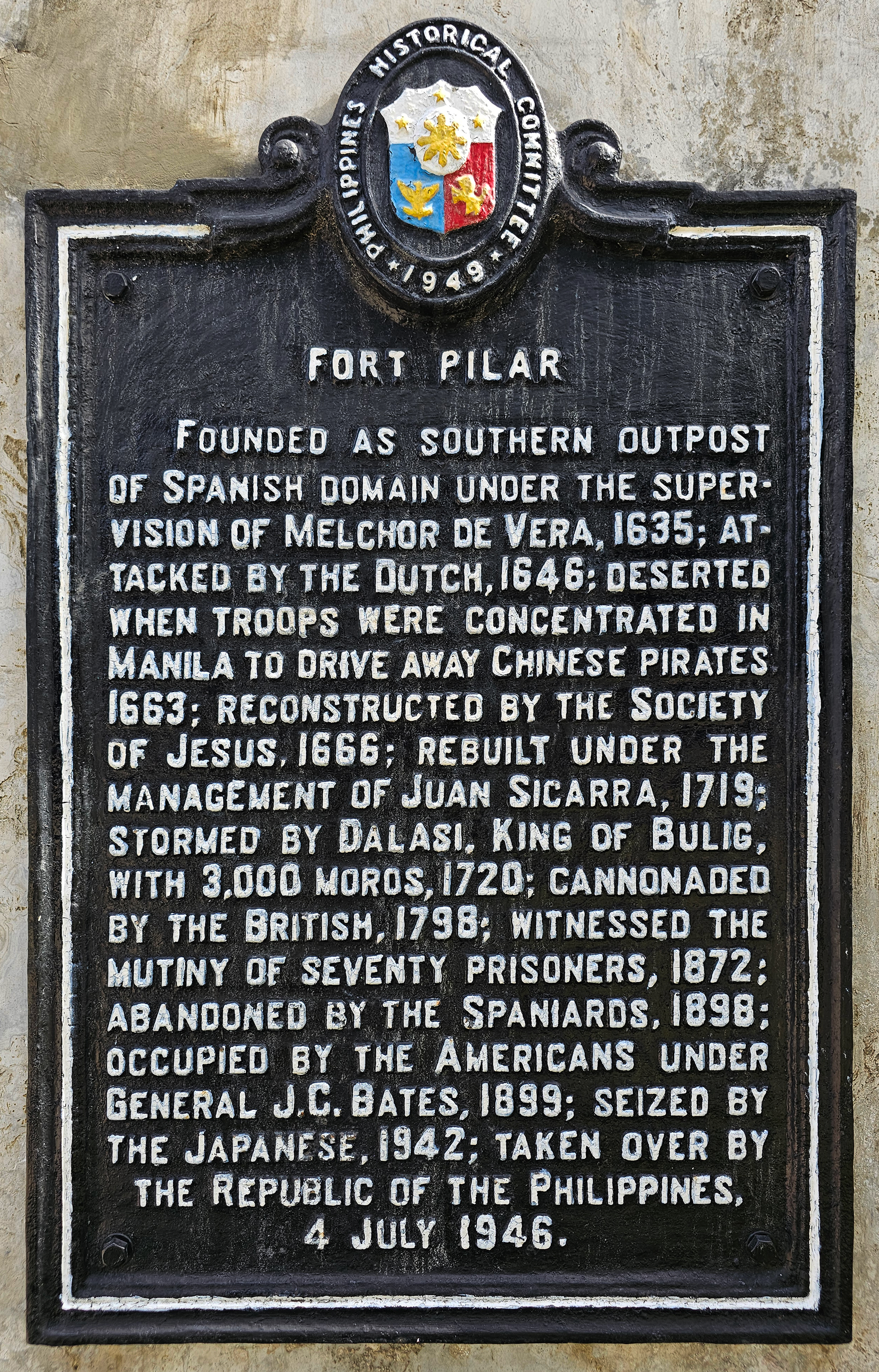
Fort Pilar Historical Marker

During World War II in 1942, Japanese forces captured and took control of the fort. It was recaptured by the United States and Filipino troops in March 1945 and was finally and officially turned over to the government of the Republic of the Philippines on July 4, 1946.

=== Restoration of the fort ===
Fort Pilar was recognized as a National Cultural Treasure on August 1, 1973, by Presidential Decree No. 260, though by then the fort had been in disrepair since World War II. Restoration was started in the early part of 1980 by the National Museum of the Philippines, which reconstructed three of the four structures inside the fort. After six years of rehabilitation work, the museum branch opened to the public with a special exhibit on Philippine Contemporary Art.

In October 1987, a permanent exhibit on the marine life of Zamboanga, Basilan and Sulu was opened at the second floor of Structure II showing 400 species of marine life specimens in giant dioramas. Also opened was a special exhibit on the 18th century relics from the Griffin Shipwreck at the ground floor, which coincided with the formal inauguration of the structure.

Former congresswoman and Zamboanga City Mayor Maria Clara Lobregat, greatly contributed to the realization of development projects in the museum. She is reportedly a staunch supporter of the Fort Pillar museum.

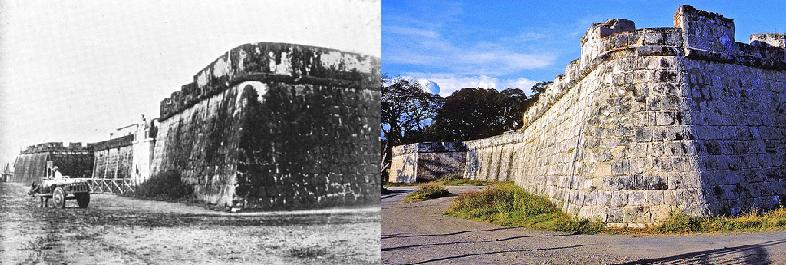
Zamboanga Fortress (now Fort Pillar), from before (left) and present (right). Note: Two different sides of the fort are shown in the photographs.

An exhibit at the National Museum of the Philippines – Zamboanga, located within the fort

== Fort Pilar today ==
Fort Pilar is now an outdoor Roman Catholic Marian shrine and a regional branch of the National Museum of the Philippines. Inside the fort, only the southern structure is still in ruins; inside and outside the fort are well maintained gardens. The Paseo del Mar, a reclaimed esplanade, protects the fort from the ravages of the sea.

On 8 October 2025, His Excellency, Most Reverend Julius Tonel, D.D, Archbishop of Zamboanga, officially declared the shrine within the fort as the "Archdiocesan Shrine of Our Lady of the Pillar."

== Gallery ==
Courtyard

The bells of the sanctuary to the Lady of the Pillar

Capilla del Santisimo Sacramento

Fort Pilar walls

The shrine at night

The fort from Paseo del Mar
