= Results of the 2013 Philippine House of Representatives elections by congressional district =

- May 13, 2013
- All 293 seats to the House of Representatives of the Philippines; 147 seats needed for a majority

The following are the results of the 2013 Philippine House of Representatives elections by congressional district.

== Abra ==
Candidate	Party	Votes	%
Ma. Jocelyn V. Bernos	Liberal Party	78,447	65.22
Rolando D. Somera	Nacionalista Party	27,377	22.76
Hans Roger S. Luna	Independent	14,463	12.02
Total		120,287	100.00

== Agusan del Norte ==
=== 1st District ===
Candidate	Party	Votes	%
Lawrence Lemuel H. Fortun	Liberal Party	94,483	63.79
Roan I. Libarios	United Nationalist Alliance	53,629	36.21
Total		148,112	100.00

=== 2nd District ===
Candidate	Party	Votes	%
Erlpe John M. Amante	Kusug Agusanon	102,240	100.00
Total		102,240	100.00

== Agusan del Sur ==
=== 1st District ===
Candidate	Party	Votes	%
Ma. Valentina G. Plaza-Cornelio	National Unity Party	74,537	62.40
Roberto S. Aquino	Liberal Party	44,913	37.60
Total		119,450	100.00

=== 2nd District ===
Candidate	Party	Votes	%
Evelyn G. Plaza-Mellana	National Unity Party	64,027	50.24
Rodolfo Rodrigo G. Plaza	Nationalist People's Coalition	63,422	49.76
Total		127,449	100.00

== Aklan ==
=== 1st District ===
Candidate	Party	Votes	%
Teodorico Haresco Jr.	Independent	104,438	43.41
Antonio T. Maming	United Nationalist Alliance	96,629	40.16
Phoebe Clarice L. Cabagnot	Independent	34,216	14.22
Ramy E. Panagsagan	Independent	5,324	2.21
Total		240,607	100.00

== Albay ==
=== 1st District ===
Candidate	Party	Votes	%
Edcel Greco Alexandre B. Lagman Jr	Liberal Party	76,114	45.68
Richard Venancio Fernando V. Ziga	United Nationalist Alliance	71,781	43.08
Gregorio Luis C. Contacto III	PDP–Laban	18,714	11.23
Total		166,609	100.00

=== 2nd District ===
Candidate	Party	Votes	%
Al Francis Bichara	Nacionalista Party	142,566	91.26
Walter L. Magdato	Independent	13,661	8.74
Total		156,227	100.00

=== 3rd District ===
Candidate	Party	Votes	%
Fernando V. Gonzalez	Liberal Party	131,804	69.05
Dante R. Arandia	Independent	59,071	30.95
Total		190,875	100.00

== Antipolo ==
=== 1st District ===
Candidate	Party	Votes	%
Ronaldo Puno	National Unity Party	86,705	76.78
Francisco R. Sumulong Jr	Independent	20,391	18.06
Dioscoro E. Esteban Jr	Independent	3,369	2.98
Florante S. Quizon	Independent	1,608	1.42
Salvador Raldy R. Abaño	Independent	851	0.75
Total		112,924	100.00

=== 2nd District ===
Candidate	Party	Votes	%
Romeo Acop	Liberal Party	74,109	61.79
Lorenzo Juan Y. Sumulong III	PDP–Laban	44,612	37.20
Silverio G. Bulanon	Independent	1,217	1.01
Total		119,938	100.00

== Antique ==
Candidate	Party	Votes	%
Paolo Everardo S. Javier	Liberal Party	124,526	56.60
Raymundo T. Roquero	United Nationalist Alliance	92,778	42.17
Antero Florante L. Villaflor Jr	Lapiang Manggagawa	2,717	1.23
Total		220,021	100.00

== Apayao ==
Candidate	Party	Votes	%
Eleanor C. Bulut-Begtang	Nationalist People's Coalition	41,871	92.07
Ambaro P. Sagle	United Nationalist Alliance	3,608	7.93
Total		45,479	100.00

== Aurora ==
Candidate	Party	Votes	%
Bellaflor A. Angara-Castillo	Laban ng Demokratikong Pilipino	58,996	69.15
Rodrigo P. Montero	Nacionalista Party	24,266	28.44
Teofilo B. Manalo	Independent	2,048	2.40
Total		85,310	100.00

== Bacolod ==
Candidate	Party	Votes	%
Evelio Leonardia	Nationalist People's Coalition	94,682	49.67
Anthony Rolando T. Golez Jr	Independent	59,910	31.43
Lyndon P. Caña	Independent	35,612	18.68
Ely Sergio F. Palma	Independent	408	0.21
Total		190,612	100.00

== Baguio ==
Candidate	Party	Votes	%
Nicasio M. Aliping Jr.	Independent	38,762	38.81
Marquez O. Go	Liberal Party	35,944	35.99
Bernardo Vergara	United Nationalist Alliance	23,865	23.89
Miguel A. Arvisu	Independent	671	0.67
Richard V. Zarate	Independent	543	0.54
Roly A. Manuel	Independent	97	0.10
Total		99,882	100.00

== Basilan ==
Candidate	Party	Votes	%
Hadjiman Hataman Salliman	Liberal Party	96,816	74.82
Yusoph J. Mando	PDP–Laban	32,584	25.18
Total		129,400	100.00

== Bataan ==
=== 1st District ===
Candidate	Party	Votes	%
Herminia Roman	Liberal Party	93,836	59.32
Felicito Payumo	Nationalist People's Coalition	64,348	40.68
Total		158,184	100.00

=== 2nd District ===
Candidate	Party	Votes	%
Enrique T. Garcia Jr.	National Unity Party	130,129	67.71
Leonardo B. Roman	Nationalist People's Coalition	56,432	29.37
Juan Miguel R. Bondoc (withdrew)	Aksyon Demokratiko	3,760	1.96
Reynan P. Calderon	Makabayan	1,852	0.96
Total		192,173	100.00

== Batanes ==
Candidate	Party	Votes	%
Henedina Abad	Liberal Party	3,813	43.45
Carlo Oliver Diasnes	Independent	3,676	41.89
Aneceto A. Mendoza	United Nationalist Alliance	1,287	14.66
Total		8,776	100.00

== Batangas ==
=== 1st District ===
Candidate	Party	Votes	%
Ma. Elenita Milagros R. Ermita-Buhain	Lakas–CMD	120,573	50.58
Tomas Apacible	Liberal Party	113,277	47.52
Luisito L. Ruiz	Independent	2,825	1.19
Reynaldo M. Albajera	Independent	1,718	0.72
Total		238,393	100.00

=== 2nd District ===
Candidate	Party	Votes	%
Raneo Abu	Nacionalista Party	105,228	42.64
Danilo Berberabe*	United Nationalist Alliance	103,309	41.86
Christopher de Leon	Liberal Party	38,236	15.49
Total		246,773	100.00

- Replaced his brother, Incumbent Provincial Board Member Godofredo Berberabe Jr., who died before the elections.

=== 3rd District ===
Candidate	Party	Votes	%
Nelson P. Collantes	Liberal Party	128,212	48.23
Sonia T. Aquino	Independent	99,374	37.38
Victoria Hernandez-Reyes	Nacionalista Party	29,349	11.04
Jose Ma. Nicomedes F. Hernandez	Pwersa ng Masang Pilipino	8,883	3.34
Total		265,818	100.00

=== 4th District ===
Candidate	Party	Votes	%
Mark Llandro Mendoza	Nationalist People's Coalition	180,401	60.19
Bernadette P. Sabili	Independent	119,296	39.81
Total		299,697	100.00

== Benguet ==
Candidate	Party	Votes	%
Ronald M. Cosalan	Liberal Party	85,534	56.37
Crescencio C. Pacalso	Independent	65,620	43.25
Renan C. Munar	National Unity Party	582	0.38
Total		151,736	100.00

== Biliran ==
Candidate	Party	Votes	%
Rogelio Espina	Liberal Party	46,072	56.39
Glenn Chong	Pwersa ng Masang Pilipino	35,421	43.35
Paul Giovanni M. Diu	Independent	210	0.26
Total		81,703	100.00

== Bohol ==
=== 1st District ===
Candidate	Party	Votes	%
Rene Relampagos	Liberal Party	144,827	74.20
Dan Lim	Nationalist People's Coalition	50,345	25.80
Total		195,172	100.00

=== 2nd District ===
Candidate	Party	Votes	%
Erico Aristotle C. Aumentado	Nationalist People's Coalition	107,086	58.10
Roberto Cajes	Liberal Party	77,215	41.90
Total		184,301	100.00

=== 3rd District ===
Candidate	Party	Votes	%
Arthur C. Yap	Nationalist People's Coalition	168,276	100.00
Total		168,276	100.00

== Bukidnon ==
=== 1st District ===
Candidate	Party	Votes	%
Ma. Lourdes O. Acosta-Alba	Liberal Party	64,133	53.49
Jesus Emmanuel M. Paras	Independent	52,048	43.41
Candido Pancrudo Jr.	Nationalist People's Coalition	3,708	3.09
Total		119,889	100.00

=== 2nd District ===
Candidate	Party	Votes	%
Florencio T. Flores Jr	Nacionalista Party	100,550	100.00
Total		100,550	100.00

=== 3rd District ===
Candidate	Party	Votes	%
Jose Ma. F. Zubiri III	Bukidnon Paglaum	134,209	87.57
Ruth B. Acosta	Aksyon Demokratiko	19,051	12.43
Total		153,260	100.00

=== 4th District ===
Candidate	Party	Votes	%
Rogelio Neil Roque	Nationalist People's Coalition	46,079	47.41
Glenn P. Peduche	Independent	26,149	26.90
Wenifredo E. Agripo	Liberal Party	24,969	25.69
Total		97,197	100.00

== Bulacan ==
=== 1st District ===
Candidate	Party	Votes	%
Maria Victoria R. Sy-Alvarado	National Unity Party	217,632	95.81
Sahiron D. Salim	Independent	9,510	4.19
Total		227,142	100.00

=== 2nd District ===
Candidate	Party	Votes	%
Gavini C. Pancho	National Unity Party	156,788	59.54
Pedrito Canisio R. Mendoza	Liberal Party	96,779	36.75
Jaime E. Villafuerte	Independent	6,356	2.41
Joseph J. Cristobal	Independent	2,627	1.00
Antonio E. Deborja	PDP–Laban	783	0.30
Total		263,333	100.00

=== 3rd District ===
Candidate	Party	Votes	%
Joselito Andrew R. Mendoza	Liberal Party	122,079	55.78
Jose L. Cabochan	United Nationalist Alliance	59,116	27.01
Enrique V. Viudez II	Independent	33,574	15.34
Ricardo C. Silverio Sr	Pwersa ng Masang Pilipino	4,072	1.86
Total		218,841	100.00

=== 4th District ===
Candidate	Party	Votes	%
Linabelle Villarica	Liberal Party	197,727	90.89
Jovel E. Lopez	Independent	19,822	9.11
Total		217,549	100.00

== Cagayan ==
=== 1st District ===
Candidate	Party	Votes	%
Salvacion S. Ponce Enrile	Nationalist People's Coalition	97,737	73.71
Ignacio B. Taruc III	Liberal Party	34,855	26.29
Total		132,592	100.00

=== 2nd District ===
Candidate	Party	Votes	%
Baby Aline Vargas-Alfonso	National Unity Party	70,407	100.00
Sherwin Calimag (disqualified)	Independent	0	0.00
Total		70,407	100.00

=== 3rd District ===
Candidate	Party	Votes	%
Randolph Ting	National Unity Party	119,613	74.45
Raymund P. Guzman	Liberal Party	41,050	25.55
Total		160,663	100.00

== Cagayan de Oro ==
=== 1st District ===
Candidate	Party	Votes	%
Rolando Uy	Liberal Party	50,449	53.33
Jose Benjamin Benaldo	Nacionalista Party	27,482	29.05
Constantino Jaraula	Laban ng Demokratikong Pilipino	10,195	10.78
Alvin R. Calingin	Aksyon Demokratiko	6,248	6.60
Ricarte A. Nagac	Independent	226	0.24
Total		94,600	100.00

=== 2nd District ===
Candidate	Party	Votes	%
Rufus Rodriguez	Centrist Democratic Party of the Philippines	88,853	81.99
Ian Mark Q. Nacaya	United Nationalist Alliance	18,963	17.50
Eric P. Saarenas	Independent	335	0.31
Leodegario A. Lagrimas	Independent	216	0.20
Total		108,367	100.00

== Caloocan ==
=== 1st District ===
Candidate	Party	Votes	%
Enrico R. Echiverri	Liberal Party	141,147	49.95
Dale Gonzalo R. Malapitan	United Nationalist Alliance	127,997	45.30
Roberto S. Guanzon	Independent	11,695	4.14
Emilda Q. Pengson	Independent	421	0.15
Maria C. Hernando	Independent	415	0.15
Milagros J. Libuton	Independent	356	0.13
Sirgea L. Villamayor	Independent	317	0.11
Sandro M. Limpin	Independent	211	0.07
Total		282,559	100.00

=== 2nd District ===
Candidate	Party	Votes	%
Edgardo R. Erice	Liberal Party	60,545	41.63
Mary Mitzi L. Cajayon-Uy	National Unity Party	52,623	36.18
Luis A. Asistio	Nationalist People's Coalition	28,276	19.44
Carlos V. Cabochan	Ang Kapatiran	3,518	2.42
Adoracion E. Garcia	Independent	491	0.34
Total		145,453	100.00

== Camarines Norte ==
=== 1st District ===
Candidate	Party	Votes	%
Catherine Barcelona-Reyes	National Unity Party	52,091	52.66
Winifredo B. Oco	Liberal Party	46,820	47.34
Total		98,911	100.00

=== 2nd District ===
Candidate	Party	Votes	%
Elmer E. Panotes	Lakas–CMD	63,029	58.55
Liwayway Vinzons-Chato	Liberal Party	36,190	33.62
Ruth F. Herrera	Independent	8,427	7.83
Total		107,646	100.00

== Camarines Sur ==
=== 1st District ===
Candidate	Party	Votes	%
Rolando Aureo G. Andaya Jr	Lakas–CMD	62,125	90.77
Nestor V. de los Reyes	Nacionalista Party	6,315	9.23
Total		68,440	100.00

=== 2nd District ===
Candidate	Party	Votes	%
Diosdado Ignacio Jose Ma. M. Arroyo	Lakas–CMD	65,926	50.54
Luis Raymund F. Villafuerte Jr	Nacionalista Party	57,436	44.03
Sabas M. Mabulo	Liberal Party	7,094	5.44
Total		130,456	100.00

=== 3rd District ===
Candidate	Party	Votes	%
Ma. Leonor S. Gerona-Robredo	Liberal Party	132,387	76.32
Nelly A. Favis-Villafuerte	Nationalist People's Coalition	38,017	21.92
Charina F. Pante	Independent	2,390	1.38
Oscar G. Arcilla Jr	PDP–Laban	678	0.39
Total		173,472	100.00

=== 4th District ===
Candidate	Party	Votes	%
Felix William Fuentebella	Nationalist People's Coalition	82,834	50.67
Ariel A. Muhlach	Liberal Party	80,629	49.33
Total		163,463	100.00

=== 5th District ===
Candidate	Party	Votes	%
Salvio Fortuno	Liberal Party	97,931	57.47
Felix R. Alfelor Jr	Nationalist People's Coalition	54,677	32.09
Res S. Cortez	United Nationalist Alliance	17,795	10.44
Total		170,403	100.00

== Camiguin ==
Candidate	Party	Votes	%
Xavier Jesus Romualdo	Nationalist People's Coalition	32,747	72.58
Homobono Adaza	Nacionalista Party	12,374	27.42
Total		45,121	100.00

== Capiz ==
=== 1st District ===
Candidate	Party	Votes	%
Antonio del Rosario	Liberal Party	113,343	78.46
Jesus Ma. Jose M. Avelino	National Unity Party	25,593	17.72
Conrado A. Tinsay II	Independent	3,128	2.17
Zenon E. Amoroso	Independent	2,389	1.65
Total		144,453	100.00

=== 2nd District ===
Candidate	Party	Votes	%
Fredenil H. Castro	National Unity Party	94,055	56.88
Maria T. Andaya	Liberal Party	71,288	43.12
Total		165,343	100.00

== Catanduanes ==
Candidate	Party	Votes	%
Cesar V. Sarmiento	Liberal Party	101,156	84.67
Leandro Verceles Jr.	Laban ng Demokratikong Pilipino	16,315	13.66
Restituto M. de Quiros Jr	Pwersa ng Masang Pilipino	2,006	1.68
Total		119,477	100.00

== Cavite ==
=== 1st District ===
Candidate	Party	Votes	%
Francis Gerald Abaya	Liberal Party	100,041	77.06
Federico A. Poblete	Nacionalista Party	29,778	22.94
Total		129,819	100.00

=== 2nd District ===
Candidate	Party	Votes	%
Jesusa Victoria G. Hernandez-Bautista Revilla	Lakas–CMD	109,203	72.11
Jessie B. Castillo	Liberal Party	40,439	26.70
Gerbie F. Ber Ado	National Unity Party	1,796	1.19
Total		151,438	100.00

=== 3rd District ===
Candidate	Party	Votes	%
Alex L. Advincula	Liberal Party	63,123	65.90
Albert T. Villaseca	Lakas–CMD	31,854	33.26
Eleazar C. Salon	Nacionalista Party	809	0.84
Total		95,786	100.00

=== 4th District ===
Candidate	Party	Votes	%
Elpidio Barzaga Jr.	National Unity Party	165,604	87.42
Miguelito M. Ilano	Lakas–CMD	23,836	12.58
Total		189,440	100.00

=== 5th District ===
Candidate	Party	Votes	%
Roy Loyola	Liberal Party	133,943	100.00
Total		133,943	100.00

=== 6th District ===
Candidate	Party	Votes	%
Luis Ferrer IV	National Unity Party	125,611	67.67
Dencito P. Campaña	Liberal Party	60,024	32.33
Total		185,635	100.00

=== 7th District ===
Candidate	Party	Votes	%
Abraham Tolentino	Liberal Party	101,075	53.53
Gilbert Cesar C. Remulla	Nacionalista Party	85,203	45.13
Norman M. Verzosa	Pwersa ng Masang Pilipino	1,971	1.04
Pedro L. Lopez	Nationalist People's Coalition	555	0.29
Total		188,804	100.00

== Cebu ==
=== 1st District ===
Candidate	Party	Votes	%
Gerald Anthony V. Gullas Jr	Nacionalista Party/Alayon	176,632	100.00
Total		176,632	100.00

=== 2nd District ===
Candidate	Party	Votes	%
Wilfredo Caminero	Liberal Party	91,529	48.75
Pablo P. Garcia	National Unity Party/One Cebu	86,105	45.86
Simeon L. Kintanar	Independent	10,137	5.40
Total		187,771	100.00

=== 3rd District ===
Candidate	Party	Votes	%
Gwendolyn Garcia	United Nationalist Alliance/One Cebu	105,424	50.47
Geraldine P. Yapha	Liberal Party	103,440	49.53
Total		208,864	100.00

=== 4th District ===
Candidate	Party	Votes	%
Benhur Salimbangon	National Unity Party/One Cebu	124,552	62.79
Celestino A. Martinez III	Liberal Party	73,811	37.21
Total		198,363	100.00

=== 5th District ===
Candidate	Party	Votes	%
Joseph Felix Mari H. Durano	Liberal Party/BAKUD	165,687	83.60
Alfie P. Pepito	One Cebu	22,211	11.21
Gilbert R. Wagas	Independent	10,287	5.19
Total		198,185	100.00

=== 6th District ===
Candidate	Party	Votes	%
Gabriel Luis R. Quisumbing	Liberal Party	125,815	63.86
Nerissa Corazon C. Soon-Ruiz	United Nationalist Alliance/One Cebu	71,216	36.14
Total		197,031	100.00

== Cebu City ==
=== 1st District ===
Candidate	Party	Votes	%
Raul del Mar	Liberal Party/BO-PK	135,368	74.67
Annabelle R. Rama-Gutierrez	United Nationalist Alliance/Partido Barug	36,051	19.88
Marlo P. Maamo	Independent	7,209	3.98
Florencio O. Villarin	Independent	1,569	0.87
Donato Sotero A. Navarro	Independent	450	0.25
Pablo Q. Doronio Jr	Independent	363	0.20
Vicente T. Mañalac	Independent	289	0.16
Juan U. Arenasa (disqualified)	Independent	0	0.00
Eliseo S. Tumulak (disqualified)	Independent	0	0.00
Total		181,299	100.00

=== 2nd District ===
Candidate	Party	Votes	%
Rodrigo A. Abellanosa Sr	Liberal Party/BO-PK	125,328	55.54
Aristotle B. Batuhan	United Nationalist Alliance/Partido Barug	100,333	44.46
Total		225,661	100.00

== Compostela Valley ==
=== 1st District ===
Candidate	Party	Votes	%
Ma. Carmen S. Zamora-Apsay	Liberal Party	72,881	100.00
Total		72,881	100.00

=== 2nd District ===
Candidate	Party	Votes	%
Rommel Amatong	Liberal Party	122,779	100.00
Total		122,779	100.00

== Cotabato ==
=== 1st District ===
Candidate	Party	Votes	%
Jesus N. Sacdalan	Liberal Party	109,987	70.63
Anthony P. Dequiña	Independent	27,043	17.37
Fernando C. Sacdalan	United Nationalist Alliance	18,692	12.00
Total		155,722	100.00

=== 2nd District ===
Candidate	Party	Votes	%
Nancy Catamco	Liberal Party	70,054	46.95
Bernardo Piñol Jr.	Independent	54,925	36.81
Gregorio A. Andolana	Independent	24,244	16.25
Total		149,223	100.00

=== 3rd District ===
Candidate	Party	Votes	%
Jose Tejada	Independent	71,978	58.53
Rodrigo G. Escudero	Nationalist People's Coalition	47,582	38.69
Amin G. Sindao	Independent	3,422	2.78
Total		122,982	100.00

== Davao City ==
=== 1st District ===
Candidate	Party	Votes	%
Karlo Alexei B. Nograles	National Unity Party	132,275	66.23
Luis C. Bonguyan	Hugpong sa Tawong Lungsod	65,999	33.04
Elly Ragen V. Pamatong	Independent	1,453	0.73
Total		199,727	100.00

=== 2nd District ===
Candidate	Party	Votes	%
Mylene J. Garcia-Albano	Liberal Party	99,869	56.16
Joji I. Bian	Independent	76,715	43.14
Ulysses S. Lopez	Independent	986	0.55
Jenell C. Nagayo	Independent	257	0.14
Total		177,827	100.00

=== 3rd District ===
Candidate	Party	Votes	%
Isidro Ungab	Liberal Party	114,657	100.00
Total		114,657	100.00

== Davao del Norte ==
=== 1st District ===
Candidate	Party	Votes	%
Antonio Rafael G. del Rosario	Liberal Party	132,705	83.51
Gelacio P. Gementiza	Independent	16,458	10.36
Emmanuel A. Mahipus	Independent	9,742	6.13
Total		158,905	100.00

=== 2nd District ===
Candidate	Party	Votes	%
Antonio Lagdameo Jr.	National Unity Party	142,453	81.57
Rico L. Peligro	Nationalist People's Coalition	32,188	18.43
Total		174,641	100.00

== Davao del Sur ==
=== 1st District ===
Candidate	Party	Votes	%
Mercedes C. Cagas	Nacionalista Party	88,149	45.28
Arsenio A. Latasa	Nationalist People's Coalition	86,811	44.59
Wilhelmina B. King-Almendras	Independent	18,462	9.48
Pablo C. Villaber	Kilusang Bagong Lipunan	1,274	0.65
Total		194,696	100.00

=== 2nd District ===
Candidate	Party	Votes	%
Franklin Bautista	Liberal Party	100,109	69.74
Randolph C. Parcasio	Nacionalista Party	43,447	30.26
Total		143,556	100.00

== Davao Oriental ==
=== 1st District ===
Candidate	Party	Votes	%
Nelson Dayanghirang Sr.	Nacionalista Party	50,826	65.64
Napoleon F. Sango	Independent	26,603	34.36
Total		77,429	100.00

=== 2nd District ===
Candidate	Party	Votes	%
Thelma Z. Almario	Lakas–CMD	100,447	100.00
Total		100,447	100.00

== Dinagat Islands ==
Candidate	Party	Votes	%
Arlene J. Bag-ao	Liberal Party	25,615	53.38
Gwendolyn Ecleo	Nacionalista Party	22,369	46.62
Total		47,984	100.00

== Eastern Samar ==
Candidate	Party	Votes	%
Ben Evardone	Nacionalista Party	113,819	52.37
Annaliza G. Kwan	Liberal Party	102,934	47.36
Febidal L. Padel	Independent	581	0.27
Total		217,334	100.00

== Guimaras ==
Candidate	Party	Votes	%
Joaquin Carlos Rahman A. Nava	Liberal Party	70,674	96.65
Tomas E. Junco Jr	Independent	2,005	2.74
Edwin G. Lim	Independent	442	0.60
Total		73,121	100.00

== Ifugao ==
Candidate	Party	Votes	%
Teodoro B. Baguilat Jr.	Liberal Party	43,751	51.22
Solomon Chungalao	Independent	41,664	48.78
Total		85,415	100.00

== Iligan ==
Candidate	Party	Votes	%
Vicente F. Belmonte Jr	Liberal Party	73,423	75.31
Uriel G. Borja	Partido Lakas ng Masa	11,555	11.85
Samson N. Dajao	Independent	10,353	10.62
Jose Noel A. Arquiza	National Unity Party	1,304	1.34
Jose O. Booc	Independent	636	0.65
Alberto L. Ora	Independent	225	0.23
Total		97,496	100.00

== Ilocos Norte ==
=== 1st District ===
Candidate	Party	Votes	%
Rodolfo C. Fariñas Sr	Nacionalista Party	110,035	100.00
Total		110,035	100.00

=== 2nd District ===
Candidate	Party	Votes	%
Imelda Remedios Visitación T. Romuáldez-Marcos	Kilusang Bagong Lipunan	114,700	88.90
Ferdinand P. Ignacio	Independent	12,536	9.72
Lorenzo S. Madamba	Independent	1,788	1.39
Total		129,024	100.00

== Ilocos Sur ==
=== 1st District ===
Candidate	Party	Votes	%
Ronald Singson	Nacionalista Party	83,910	67.64
Bertrand A. Baterina	Liberal Party	40,135	32.36
Total		124,045	100.00

=== 2nd District ===
Candidate	Party	Votes	%
Eric D. Singson Sr	Liberal Party	140,051	85.41
Henry S. Capela	Aksyon Demokratiko	23,923	14.59
Total		163,974	100.00

== Iloilo ==
=== 1st District ===
Candidate	Party	Votes	%
Oscar Richard S. Garin Jr	Liberal Party	101,352	70.36
Julieta N. Flores	United Nationalist Alliance	42,698	29.64
Total		144,050	100.00

=== 2nd District ===
Candidate	Party	Votes	%
Arcadio H. Gorriceta	Liberal Party	56,846	42.17
Salvador P. Cabaluna III	Independent	46,140	34.23
Augusto L. Syjuco Jr	United Nationalist Alliance	31,818	23.60
Total		134,804	100.00

=== 3rd District ===
Candidate	Party	Votes	%
Arthur Defensor Jr.	Liberal Party	126,034	80.60
Francis G. Lavilla	United Nationalist Alliance	30,336	19.40
Total		156,370	100.00

=== 4th District ===
Candidate	Party	Votes	%
Hernan G. Biron Jr	United Nationalist Alliance	80,064	51.27
Niel Tupas Sr.	Liberal Party	76,104	48.73
Total		156,168	100.00

=== 5th District ===
Candidate	Party	Votes	%
Niel Tupas Jr.	Liberal Party	120,079	70.42
Jett C. Rojas	United Nationalist Alliance	50,439	29.58
Total		170,518	100.00

== Iloilo City ==
Candidate	Party	Votes	%
Geronimo P. Treñas	Liberal Party	127,791	65.96
Raul T. Gonzalez Jr	United Nationalist Alliance	65,958	34.04
Total		193,749	100.00

== Isabela ==
=== 1st District ===
Candidate	Party	Votes	%
Rodolfo Albano III	Nationalist People's Coalition	135,346	97.47
Stephen G. Soliven	Independent	3,515	2.53
Total		138,861	100.00

=== 2nd District ===
Candidate	Party	Votes	%
Ana Cristina S. Go	Nacionalista Party	89,053	61.85
Edwin C. Uy	Liberal Party	54,929	38.15
Total		143,982	100.00

=== 3rd District ===
Candidate	Party	Votes	%
Napoleon S. Dy	Nationalist People's Coalition	114,939	76.36
Ramon M. Reyes	Aksyon Demokratiko	35,588	23.64
Total		150,527	100.00

=== 4th District ===
Candidate	Party	Votes	%
Giorgidi B. Aggabao	Nationalist People's Coalition	119,683	72.96
Anthony C. Miranda	Pwersa ng Masang Pilipino	37,201	22.68
Danilo S. Tan	Aksyon Demokratiko	7,147	4.36
Total		164,031	100.00

== Kalinga ==
Candidate	Party	Votes	%
Manuel S. Agyao	Liberal Party	68,279	65.96
Macario A. Duguiang	United Nationalist Alliance	35,233	34.04
Total		103,512	100.00

== La Union ==
=== 1st District ===
Candidate	Party	Votes	%
Victor Francisco C. Ortega	Lakas–CMD	128,055	97.33
Ruella H. Tongson	Independent	3,510	2.67
Total		131,565	100.00

=== 2nd District ===
Candidate	Party	Votes	%
Eufranio Eriguel	Nationalist People's Coalition	158,350	84.00
Tomas L. Dumpit Jr	National Unity Party	30,162	16.00
Total		188,512	100.00

== Laguna ==
=== 1st District ===
Candidate	Party	Votes	%
Danilo Ramon S. Fernandez	Liberal Party	190,946	73.65
Gat-Ala A. Alatiit Jr	PDP-Laban	68,326	26.35
Total		259,272	100.00

=== 2nd District ===
Candidate	Party	Votes	%
Joaquin M. Chipeco Jr	Liberal Party	182,372	61.85
Teresita Lazaro	PDP–Laban	112,480	38.15
Total		294,852	100.00

=== 3rd District ===
Candidate	Party	Votes	%
Marisol C. Aragones-Sampelo	United Nationalist Alliance	102,293	49.56
Ma. Evita R. Arago	Liberal Party	94,803	45.93
Celia C. Lopez	PDP–Laban	9,310	4.51
Total		206,406	100.00

=== 4th District ===
Candidate	Party	Votes	%
Benjamin Agarao Jr.	Liberal Party	97,211	46.58
Antonio M. Carolino	Nacionalista Party	83,571	40.04
Benedicto Mario C. Palacol Jr	PDP–Laban	27,918	13.38
Total		208,700	100.00

== Lanao del Norte ==
=== 1st District ===
Candidate	Party	Votes	%
Imelda C. Quibranza-Dimaporo	Nationalist People's Coalition	59,548	75.11
Madid Elias L. Ali	Liberal Party	12,303	15.52
Roberto M. Quicio Jr	Independent	7,427	9.37
Total		79,278	100.00

=== 2nd District ===
Candidate	Party	Votes	%
Abdullah D. Dimaporo	Nationalist People's Coalition	67,626	56.32
Acmad D. Omar	Liberal Party	52,440	43.68
Total		120,066	100.00

== Lanao del Sur ==
=== 1st District ===
Candidate	Party	Votes	%
Ansaruddin Abdul Malik A. Adiong	Liberal Party	79,101	47.90
Faysah Racman Pimping M. Dumarpa	PDP–Laban	68,051	41.21
Mohammed Hussein P. Pangandaman	Independent	16,964	10.27
Monaoray A. Saripada	Independent	1,006	0.61
Total		165,122	100.00

=== 2nd District ===
Candidate	Party	Votes	%
Pangalian Balindong	Liberal Party	72,190	62.25
Benasing Macarambon Jr.	PDP–Laban	38,026	32.79
Salih Abdul H. Benito	Ompia Party	4,508	3.89
Bolkisah D. Bantuas	Independent	1,250	1.08
Total		115,974	100.00

== Lapu-Lapu City ==
Candidate	Party	Votes	%
Aileen C. Radaza	Lakas–CMD	61,491	56.76
Angel S. Rodriguez	Liberal Party	32,249	29.77
Remegio B. Oyao	Independent	14,589	13.47
Total		108,329	100.00

== Las Piñas ==
Candidate	Party	Votes	%
Mark Villar	Nacionalista Party	152,885	90.31
Luis R. Casimiro	Independent	13,626	8.05
Filipino R. Alvarado	Independent	2,781	1.64
Total		169,292	100.00

== Leyte ==
=== 1st District ===
Candidate	Party	Votes	%
Ferdinand Martin G. Romualdez	Lakas–CMD	122,022	100.00
Total		122,022	100.00

=== 2nd District ===
Candidate	Party	Votes	%
Sergio Antonio F. Apostol	Liberal Party	95,534	65.27
Edgardo M. Enerlan	Tingog Leytenon	39,607	27.06
Alberto N. Hidalgo	PDP–Laban	11,234	7.67
Total		146,375	100.00

=== 3rd District ===
Candidate	Party	Votes	%
Andres D. Salvacion Jr	Liberal Party	48,156	56.32
Bernard Jonathan M. Remandaban	United Nationalist Alliance	37,344	43.68
Total		85,500	100.00

=== 4th District ===
Candidate	Party	Votes	%
Lucy Marie M. Torres-Gomez	Liberal Party	112,560	57.77
Eric C. Codilla	Lakas–CMD	82,283	42.23
Total		194,843	100.00

=== 5th District ===
Candidate	Party	Votes	%
Jose Carlos L. Cari	Liberal Party	117,398	79.76
Renato G. Roble	United Nationalist Alliance	28,393	19.29
Crispulo R. Truya	Independent	1,394	0.95
Total		147,185	100.00

== Maguindanao ==
=== 1st District ===
Candidate	Party	Votes	%
Bai Sandra S. Ampatuan-Sema	Liberal Party	108,086	64.59
Bai Sendig G. Dilangalen	Pwersa ng Masang Pilipino	55,829	33.36
Sindatu S. Dilangalen	Independent	2,419	1.45
Guiamalodin B. Mohamad	PDP–Laban	999	0.60
Total		167,333	100.00

=== 2nd District ===
Candidate	Party	Votes	%
Zajid G. Mangudadatu	Liberal Party	66,330	48.83
Merinisa A. Datumanong-Salliman	Lakas–CMD	41,627	30.65
Ali B. Sangki	Pwersa ng Masang Pilipino	15,716	11.57
Solaiman M. Sandigan	Independent	5,009	3.69
Basit K. Esmael	Independent	2,601	1.91
Jaafar Apollo Mikhail L. Matalam	Independent	2,313	1.70
Habbas S. Camendan	Independent	1,427	1.05
Pendatun A. Pangadil	Independent	804	0.59
Total		135,827	100.00

== Makati ==
=== 1st District ===
Candidate	Party	Votes	%
Monique Yazmin Maria Q. Lagdameo	United Nationalist Alliance	92,348	84.53
Virgilio R. Batalla	Independent	8,737	8.00
Ediberto M. Cuenca	Ang Kapatiran	4,792	4.39
Miguel C. Lopez Jr	Independent	3,366	3.08
Total		109,243	100.00

=== 2nd District ===
Candidate	Party	Votes	%
Mar-Len Abigail S. Binay-Campos	United Nationalist Alliance	117,565	93.56
Joel A. Sarza	Independent	8,098	6.44
Total		125,663	100.00

== Malabon ==
Candidate	Party	Votes	%
Josephine Veronique R. Lacson-Noel	Nationalist People's Coalition	82,380	100.00
Total		82,380	100.00

== Mandaluyong ==
Candidate	Party	Votes	%
Neptali Gonzales II	Liberal Party	104,851	89.13
Francisco R. Reyes	Ang Kapatiran	10,615	9.02
Gerard A. Castillo	Independent	1,699	1.44
Renato S. Panem	Independent	478	0.41
Total		117,643	100.00

== Manila ==
=== 1st District ===
Candidate	Party	Votes	%
Benjamin R. Asilo	Liberal Party	88,447	63.48
Ernesto G. Dionisio Sr	United Nationalist Alliance	47,796	34.30
Fernando F. Diaz	Independent	2,473	1.77
Ricky T. Bacolod	Independent	616	0.44
Total		139,332	100.00

=== 2nd District ===
Candidate	Party	Votes	%
Carlo Vincent V. Lopez	Liberal Party	59,047	69.04
Edward M. Tan	United Nationalist Alliance	26,478	30.96
Total		85,525	100.00

=== 3rd District ===
Candidate	Party	Votes	%
Ma. Zenaida A. Benedicto-Angping	Asenso Manileño	46,353	57.30
Ramon D. Morales	KKK	33,382	41.26
Alex M. Garcia	Independent	1,166	1.44
Total		80,901	100.00

=== 4th District ===
Candidate	Party	Votes	%
Ma. Theresa B. Bonoan-David	National Unity Party	80,461	100.00
Total		80,461	100.00

=== 5th District ===
Candidate	Party	Votes	%
Amado Bagatsing	United Nationalist Alliance/KABAKA	102,770	88.85
Faith C. Maganto	Nationalist People's Coalition	11,455	9.90
Mario F. Cayabyab	Kilusang Bagong Lipunan	1,437	1.24
Total		115,662	100.00

=== 6th District ===
Candidate	Party	Votes	%
Rosenda Ann M. Ocampo	Liberal Party	50,632	51.88
Bienvenido M. Abante Jr	United Nationalist Alliance	46,244	47.38
Richard M. Bautista	Independent	459	0.47
Francisco C. Candaza	Independent	258	0.26
Total		97,593	100.00

== Marikina ==
=== 1st District ===
Candidate	Party	Votes	%
Marcelino Teodoro	Liberal Party	60,199	100.00
Total		60,199	100.00

=== 2nd District ===
Candidate	Party	Votes	%
Romero Federico S. Quimbo	Liberal Party	71,695	95.17
Albert D. Bocobo	Independent	3,637	4.83
Total		75,332	100.00

== Marinduque ==
Candidate	Party	Votes	%
Lord Allan Jay Q. Velasco	Liberal Party	48,396	48.10
Regina Reyes Mandanas	National Unity Party	52,209	51.90
Total		100,605	100.00

- Lord Allan Velasco took office on February 1, 2016, after winning an electoral protest against Regina Reyes Mandanas. Mandanas was removed on January 12, 2016, after an electoral protest regarding her citizenship.

== Masbate ==
=== 1st District ===
Candidate	Party	Votes	%
Ma. Vida Espinosa-Bravo	National Unity Party	44,420	62.91
Ricardo B. Butalid Jr	Liberal Party	26,186	37.09
Total		70,606	100.00

=== 2nd District ===
Candidate	Party	Votes	%
Elisa Olga T. Kho	Lakas–CMD	64,003	59.31
Darius M. Tuason Sr	Nationalist People's Coalition	43,906	40.69
Total		107,909	100.00

=== 3rd District ===
Candidate	Party	Votes	%
Scott Davies S. Lanete	Nationalist People's Coalition	62,408	54.28
Mac John C. Seachon	Liberal Party	50,417	43.85
Ricardo L. Yanson	Independent	2,146	1.87
Total		114,971	100.00

== Misamis Occidental ==
=== 1st District ===
Candidate	Party	Votes	%
Jorge T. Almonte	Liberal Party	84,045	78.10
Franklin E. Omandam	Independent	23,566	21.90
Total		107,611	100.00

=== 2nd District ===
Candidate	Party	Votes	%
Henry S. Oaminal Sr	Nacionalista Party	88,424	61.20
Loreto Leo S. Ocampos	Liberal Party	56,054	38.80
Total		144,478	100.00

== Misamis Oriental ==
=== 1st District ===
Candidate	Party	Votes	%
Peter Unabia	Liberal Party	127,065	87.55
Henry Clyde C. Abbott	Independent	14,239	9.81
Rommel S. Zagado	Lapiang Manggagawa	3,838	2.64
Total		145,142	100.00

=== 2nd District ===
Candidate	Party	Votes	%
Juliette Uy	Independent	74,062	37.30
Augusto Eduardo H. Baculio Sr	Nacionalista Party	58,545	29.48
Antonio P. Calingin	Independent	37,043	18.65
Jesus Resurreccion M. Jardin	Liberal Party	28,922	14.56
Total		198,572	100.00

== Mountain Province ==
Candidate	Party	Votes	%
Maximo B. Dalog Sr	Liberal Party	32,597	43.15
Jupiter C. Dominguez	United Nationalist Alliance	29,218	38.68
Roy L. Manao	Nationalist People's Coalition	13,720	18.16
Total		75,535	100.00

== Muntinlupa ==
Candidate	Party	Votes	%
Rodolfo Biazon	Liberal Party	127,630	75.52
Emerson S. Espeleta	Nationalist People's Coalition	32,496	19.23
Santiago V. Carlos Jr	Independent	5,196	3.07
Rafael I. Burgos	Independent	2,093	1.24
Domingo L. Tambuatco	Ang Kapatiran	1,588	0.94
Total		169,003	100.00

== Navotas ==
Candidate	Party	Votes	%
John Reynald M. Tiangco	United Nationalist Alliance/Partido Navoteño	69,107	80.22
Rico J. de Guzman	Liberal Party	17,042	19.78
Total		86,149	100.00

== Negros Occidental ==
=== 1st District ===
Candidate	Party	Votes	%
Julio A. Ledesma IV	Nationalist People's Coalition	94,081	63.77
Nehemias G. de la Cruz Sr	Pwersa ng Masang Pilipino	52,787	35.78
Ernesto L. Librando	Aksyon Demokratiko	538	0.36
Leopoldo G. Sua	Independent	125	0.08
Total		147,531	100.00

=== 2nd District ===
Candidate	Party	Votes	%
Leo Rafael M. Cueva	National Unity Party/United Negros Alliance	81,310	82.32
Otilia A. Galilea	Nationalist People's Coalition	17,469	17.68
Total		98,779	100.00

=== 3rd District ===
Candidate	Party	Votes	%
Alfredo Abelardo B. Benitez	Liberal Party	130,623	67.36
Jose Carlos V. Lacson	Lakas–CMD	63,305	32.64
Total		193,928	100.00

=== 4th District ===
Candidate	Party	Votes	%
Jeffrey Ferrer	United Negros Alliance	92,090	59.78
Ike M. Barredo	Nationalist People's Coalition	61,391	39.85
Leonardo C. Erobas	Independent	578	0.38
Total		154,059	100.00

=== 5th District ===
Candidate	Party	Votes	%
Alejandro Mirasol	Liberal Party	85,245	50.49
Emilio Bernardino L. Yulo III	Nacionalista Party	83,576	49.51
Total		168,821	100.00

=== 6th District ===
Candidate	Party	Votes	%
Mercedes Alvarez–Lansang	Nationalist People's Coalition	101,824	65.61
Philip B. Arles	National Unity Party	53,366	34.39
Total		155,190	100.00

== Negros Oriental ==
=== 1st District ===
Candidate	Party	Votes	%
Manuel M. Iway	Liberal Party	67,880	49.15
Jerome V. Paras	Nationalist People's Coalition	66,072	47.84
Lowell A. Andaya	Independent	3,399	2.46
Danilo C. Roble	Independent	755	0.55
Total		138,106	100.00

=== 2nd District ===
Candidate	Party	Votes	%
George P. Arnaiz	Nationalist People's Coalition	104,343	54.01
Karen F. Villanueva	Liberal Party	86,722	44.89
Raul S. Aniñon	Independent	2,110	1.09
Total		193,175	100.00

=== 3rd District ===
Candidate	Party	Votes	%
Pryde Henry Teves	Nationalist People's Coalition	93,540	69.87
Marcelo G. Adanza	Liberal Party	40,329	30.13
Total		133,869	100.00

== Northern Samar ==
=== 1st District* ===
Candidate	Party	Votes	%
Harlin C. Abayon Jr	Nacionalista Party	72,857	50.02
Raul Daza	Liberal Party	72,805	49.98
Total		145,662	100.00

- Harlin Abayon was removed by the House of Representatives Electoral Tribunal on February 3, 2016, after an electoral protest. Abayon was reinstated by the Supreme Court on May 3, 2016, but his reinstatement was not implemented. Raul Daza took office on May 23, 2016, after winning an electoral protest against Harlin Abayon.

=== 2nd District ===
Candidate	Party	Votes	%
Emil L. Ong	National Unity Party	78,003	60.46
Ramp Nielsen S. Uy	Liberal Party	51,014	39.54
Total		129,017	100.00

== Nueva Ecija ==
=== 1st District ===
Candidate	Party	Votes	%
Estrellita B. Suansing	Unang Sigaw	109,059	50.40
Mariano Cristino N. Joson	Nationalist People's Coalition/BALANE	90,125	41.65
Renato V. Diaz	Independent	17,219	7.96
Total		216,403	100.00

=== 2nd District ===
Candidate	Party	Votes	%
Joseph Gilbert Violago	Liberal Party/Unang Sigaw	164,214	100.00
Total		164,214	100.00

=== 3rd District ===
Candidate	Party	Votes	%
Czarina Umali	Liberal Party/Unang Sigaw	142,429	62.49
Jose Virgilio L. Bautista	United Nationalist Alliance	79,907	35.06
Jay Orlando C. Valino	Independent	5,600	2.46
Total		227,936	100.00

=== 4th District ===
Candidate	Party	Votes	%
Magnolia Rosa C. Antonino-Nadres	National Unity Party	141,762	57.60
Froilan A. Nagaño	BALANE	46,251	18.79
Julita L. Villareal	Nationalist People's Coalition	32,700	13.29
Aurora Sonia R. Lorenzo	Liberal Party/Unang Sigaw	25,414	10.33
Total		246,127	100.00

== Nueva Vizcaya ==
Candidate	Party	Votes	%
Carlos M. Padilla	Nacionalista Party	102,586	58.75
Luisa Cuaresma	United Nationalist Alliance	70,140	40.17
Lawrence S. Sta. Ana	Independent	1,879	1.08
Total		174,605	100.00

== Occidental Mindoro ==
Candidate	Party	Votes	%
Josephine Y. Ramirez-Sato	Liberal Party	121,792	69.34
Edgardo A. Urieta	Lakas–CMD	53,844	30.66
Total		175,636	100.00

== Oriental Mindoro ==
=== 1st District ===
Candidate	Party	Votes	%
Paulino Salvador Leachon	Liberal Party	98,779	56.23
John Nico P. Valencia	United Nationalist Alliance	68,484	38.99
Renato V. Leviste	Nationalist People's Coalition	8,400	4.78
Total		175,663	100.00

=== 2nd District ===
Candidate	Party	Votes	%
Reynaldo Umali	Liberal Party	98,771	100.00
Total		98,771	100.00

== Palawan ==
=== 1st District ===
Candidate	Party	Votes	%
Franz Josef George E. Alvarez	National Unity Party/PPP	84,953	53.82
Alvin S. Sandoval	Liberal Party	39,831	25.24
Roberto V. Rodriguez	United Nationalist Alliance	29,954	18.98
Randy M. Rodriguez	Independent	1,616	1.02
Fernando G. Saw	Independent	1,481	0.94
Total		157,835	100.00

=== 2nd District ===
Candidate	Party	Votes	%
Frederick Abueg	PPP	74,735	58.17
Ramon Mitra III	Nacionalista Party	53,009	41.26
Christopher A. Morales	Independent	724	0.56
Total		128,468	100.00

=== 3rd District ===
Candidate	Party	Votes	%
Douglas S. Hagedorn	Nationalist People's Coalition	44,904	52.57
Jimmy L. Carbonell	Independent	22,614	26.47
Eduardo S. Matillano	Independent	12,614	14.77
Raymundo C. Lagasca Jr	Independent	4,858	5.69
Arcelie V. Altamera	Independent	254	0.30
Santiago L. Lazo	Independent	175	0.20
Total		85,419	100.00

== Pampanga ==
=== 1st District ===
Candidate	Party	Votes	%
Joseller M. Guiao	Kambilan	125,043	58.63
Francis Nepomuceno	Nationalist People's Coalition	88,219	41.37
Total		213,262	100.00

=== 2nd District ===
Candidate	Party	Votes	%
Ma. Gloria M. Macapagal-Arroyo	Lakas–CMD	168,718	88.35
Vivian T. Dabu	Liberal Party	18,547	9.71
Charlie G. Chua	Independent	2,235	1.17
Josefina C. Leoncio	Independent	1,462	0.77
Total		190,962	100.00

=== 3rd District ===
Candidate	Party	Votes	%
Oscar Samson Rodriguez	Liberal Party	140,826	56.53
Aurelio Gonzales Jr.	Nationalist People's Coalition	108,275	43.47
Total		249,101	100.00

=== 4th District ===
Candidate	Party	Votes	%
Juan Pablo Bondoc	Nacionalista Party	122,537	55.73
Jerry L. Pelayo	Nationalist People's Coalition	96,391	43.84
Ramon F. Sediego	Independent	952	0.43
Total		219,880	100.00

== Pangasinan ==
=== 1st District ===
Candidate	Party	Votes	%
Jesus F. Celeste	Nationalist People's Coalition	109,914	66.67
Leonido J. Pulido III	Liberal Party	54,949	33.33
Total		164,863	100.00

=== 2nd District ===
Candidate	Party	Votes	%
Leopoldo N. Bataoil	Nationalist People's Coalition	154,466	74.31
Ma. Blanca Kim M. Bernardo-Lokin	Liberal Party	53,394	25.69
Total		207,860	100.00

=== 3rd District ===
Candidate	Party	Votes	%
Rose Marie B. Jimenez-Arenas	Liberal Party	201,340	100.00
Total		201,340	100.00

=== 4th District ===
Candidate	Party	Votes	%
Ma. Georgina V. Perez-de Venecia	Nationalist People's Coalition	175,667	85.73
Celia C. Lim	Nacionalista Party	29,251	14.27
Total		204,918	100.00

=== 5th District ===
Candidate	Party	Votes	%
Ma. Carmen S. Cojuangco	Nationalist People's Coalition	164,504	91.41
Demetrio G. Demetria	Independent	15,466	8.59
Total		179,970	100.00

=== 6th District ===
Candidate	Party	Votes	%
Marlyn Primicias-Agabas	Nationalist People's Coalition	161,362	100.00
Total		161,362	100.00

== Parañaque ==
=== 1st District ===
Candidate	Party	Votes	%
Eric Olivarez	Liberal Party	50,981	62.81
Eduardo Zialcita	Nacionalista Party	28,651	35.30
Florante C. Romey Jr	Independent	1,533	1.89
Total		81,165	100.00

=== 2nd District ===
Candidate	Party	Votes	%
Gustavo Alonzo S. Tambunting	United Nationalist Alliance	57,471	53.03
Artemio Joselito P. Marquez Jr	Independent	47,912	44.21
Pacifico C. Rosal	Independent	2,992	2.76
Total		108,375	100.00

== Pasay ==
Candidate	Party	Votes	%
Imelda G. Calixto-Rubiano	Liberal Party	130,425	82.05
Santiago C. Quial	Nationalist People's Coalition	24,086	15.15
Pastor T. de Castro Jr	Independent	4,438	2.79
Total		158,949	100.00

== Pasig ==
Candidate	Party	Votes	%
Roman Romulo	Liberal Party	217,325	87.39
Orlando M. Salatandre Jr	United Nationalist Alliance	31,373	12.61
Total		248,698	100.00

== Quezon ==
=== 1st District ===
Candidate	Party	Votes	%
Wilfrido Mark M. Enverga Jr	Nationalist People's Coalition	115,527	79.54
Pauline Ann C. Villaseñor	Aksyon Demokratiko	29,713	20.46
Total		145,240	100.00

=== 2nd District ===
Candidate	Party	Votes	%
Vicente J. Alcala	Liberal Party	131,178	60.91
Barbara Ruby C. Talaga	United Nationalist Alliance	55,519	25.78
Lynnette A. Punzalan	Independent	25,208	11.71
Kneigoutina M. Suarez	Lakas–CMD	2,801	1.30
Marivic R. Rivera	Independent	646	0.30
Total		215,352	100.00

=== 3rd District ===
Candidate	Party	Votes	%
Aleta R. Catarina-Suarez	Lakas–CMD	88,905	63.34
Sheila B. de Leon	Liberal Party	50,000	35.62
Eduardo T. Rodriguez	Independent	1,466	1.04
Total		140,371	100.00

=== 4th District ===
Candidate	Party	Votes	%
Angelina Tan	Nationalist People's Coalition	84,782	49.14
Wigberto Tañada	Liberal Party	80,698	46.78
Alvin John S. Tañada	Lapiang Manggagawa	7,038	4.08
Total		172,518	100.00

== Quezon City ==
=== 1st District ===
Candidate	Party	Votes	%
Francisco A. Calalay Jr	PDP–Laban	74,033	55.21
Rita Katherine D. Crisologo	United Nationalist Alliance	57,927	43.20
Gary N. Jamile	Independent	2,138	1.59
Total		134,098	100.00

=== 2nd District ===
Candidate	Party	Votes	%
Winston T. Castelo	Liberal Party	85,855	63.55
Ismael G. Mathay III	Independent	49,244	36.45
Total		135,099	100.00

=== 3rd District ===
Candidate	Party	Votes	%
Jorge John B. Banal Jr	Liberal Party	49,731	55.72
Matias Defensor Jr.	United Nationalist Alliance	39,513	44.28
Total		89,244	100.00

=== 4th District ===
Candidate	Party	Votes	%
Feliciano Belmonte Jr.	Liberal Party	103,338	91.16
Albert Hans C. Palacios	Pwersa ng Masang Pilipino	10,017	8.84
Total		113,355	100.00

=== 5th District ===
Candidate	Party	Votes	%
Alfredo Paolo D. Vargas III	Liberal Party	69,463	61.71
Mary Ann L. Susano	KKK	26,986	23.98
Dante V. Liban	United Nationalist Alliance	11,301	10.04
Isagani H. Oro	Aksyon Demokratiko	4,805	4.27
Total		112,555	100.00

=== 6th District ===
Candidate	Party	Votes	%
Jose Christopher Y. Belmonte	Liberal Party	80,796	100.00
Total		80,796	100.00

== Quirino ==
Candidate	Party	Votes	%
Dakila Carlo E. Cua	Liberal Party	69,379	100.00
Total		69,379	100.00

== Rizal ==
=== 1st District ===
Candidate	Party	Votes	%
Joel Roy R. Duavit	Nationalist People's Coalition	230,303	100.00
Total		230,303	100.00

=== 2nd District ===
Candidate	Party	Votes	%
Isidro S. Rodriguez Jr	Nationalist People's Coalition	213,731	100.00
Total		213,731	100.00

== Romblon ==
Candidate	Party	Votes	%
Eleandro Jesus Madrona	Nacionalista Party	91,513	76.24
Natalio F. Beltran III	United Nationalist Alliance	28,519	23.76
Total		120,032	100.00

== Samar ==
=== 1st District ===
Candidate	Party	Votes	%
Mel Senen Sarmiento	Liberal Party	86,987	59.97
Arnold V. Tan	Nacionalista Party	56,798	39.16
Antolin R. Tan II	Independent	1,272	0.88
Total		145,057	100.00

=== 2nd District ===
Candidate	Party	Votes	%
Milagrosa Tan	Nationalist People's Coalition	97,212	51.44
Eunice U. Babalcon	Liberal Party	75,541	39.97
Reynato R. Latorre	United Nationalist Alliance	16,218	8.58
Total		188,971	100.00

== San Jose del Monte ==
Candidate	Party	Votes	%
Arturo B. Robes	Liberal Party	79,120	62.96
Imelda Papin	Lakas–CMD	40,428	32.17
Oscar V. Robes	Independent	2,741	2.18
Albert G. Rejante	Independent	1,678	1.34
Rogelio F. Montinola	Independent	960	0.76
Garret Ian B. Miso	Independent	733	0.58
Total		125,660	100.00

== San Juan ==
Candidate	Party	Votes	%
Ronaldo Zamora	United Nationalist Alliance/Partido Magdiwang	23,725	51.65
Jannah A. Ejercito	Nationalist People's Coalition	22,211	48.35
Total		45,936	100.00

== Sarangani ==
Candidate	Party	Votes	%
Emmanuel D. Pacquiao Sr.	United Nationalist Alliance/PCM	149,135	100.00
Total		149,135	100.00

== Siquijor ==
Candidate	Party	Votes	%
Marie Anne S. Pernes*	Liberal Party	29,530	54.68
Orlando A. Fua Jr	Independent	24,474	45.32
Total		54,004	100.00

- Replaced her husband, Dr. Jose Jay Pernes, who died on the eve of elections.

== Sorsogon ==
=== 1st District ===
Candidate	Party	Votes	%
Evelina B. Guevara-Escudero	Nationalist People's Coalition	87,904	58.78
Aeneas Eli S. Diaz	Independent	40,743	27.24
Arnulfo L. Perete	Independent	20,904	13.98
Total		149,551	100.00

=== 2nd District ===
Candidate	Party	Votes	%
Deogracias B. Ramos Jr	Liberal Party	102,000	66.90
Guillermo O. de Castro	United Nationalist Alliance	41,265	27.07
Sappho G. Ong	Pwersa ng Masang Pilipino	7,588	4.98
Jose Solis*	Independent	1,602	1.05
Total		152,455	100.00

- Died on April 23, 2013.

== South Cotabato ==
=== 1st District ===
Candidate	Party	Votes	%
Pedro B. Acharon Jr	Nationalist People's Coalition	138,079	51.43
Rogelio Pacquiao	United Nationalist Alliance/PCM	130,377	48.57
Total		268,456	100.00

=== 2nd District ===
Candidate	Party	Votes	%
Ferdinand L. Hernandez	Nationalist People's Coalition	121,933	57.14
Elmo B. Tolosa	United Nationalist Alliance/PCM	89,776	42.07
Efren H. Biclar	Independent	1,338	0.63
Netz P. Varona	Independent	338	0.16
Total		213,385	100.00

== Southern Leyte ==
=== 1st District ===
Candidate	Party	Votes	%
Damian Mercado	National Unity Party	101,579	54.93
Rico C. Rentuza	Akbayan Citizens Action Party	41,578	22.49
Marisa Y. Lerias	Liberal Party	40,678	22.00
Vicente A. Geraldo	Independent	1,073	0.58
Total		184,908	100.00

== Sultan Kudarat ==
=== 1st District ===
Candidate	Party	Votes	%
Raden C. Sakaluran	Independent	81,110	60.38
Carlos L. Valdez Jr	Liberal Party	53,229	39.62
Total		134,339	100.00

=== 2nd District ===
Candidate	Party	Votes	%
Arnulfo F. Go	National Unity Party	83,037	89.34
Roberto E. Examen	Independent	9,913	10.66
Total		92,950	100.00

== Sulu ==
=== 1st District ===
Candidate	Party	Votes	%
Habib Tupay T. Loong	National Unity Party	85,834	74.73
Tarhata I. Misuari	Independent	19,743	17.19
Alvarez Isnaji	Nationalist People's Coalition	9,285	8.08
Total		114,862	100.00

=== 2nd District ===
Candidate	Party	Votes	%
Maryam N. Arbison	Liberal Party	42,134	69.40
Nur-Ana Sahidulla	Nationalist People's Coalition	18,576	30.60
Total		60,710	100.00

== Surigao del Norte ==
=== 1st District ===
Candidate	Party	Votes	%
Francisco T. Matugas I	Liberal Party	45,766	83.58
Gertrudes C. Saberon	Independent	6,341	11.58
Teodulfo E. Espejon	Makabayan	2,650	4.84
Total		54,757	100.00

=== 2nd District ===
Candidate	Party	Votes	%
Guillermo A. Romarate Jr	Liberal Party	89,182	52.79
Robert Ace S. Barbers	Nacionalista Party	78,864	46.68
Pepito M. Lago	Independent	889	0.53
Total		168,935	100.00

== Surigao del Sur ==
=== 1st District ===
Candidate	Party	Votes	%
Philip A. Pichay*	Lakas–CMD	84,073	56.88
Mary Elizabeth O. Ty-Delgado	Liberal Party	61,661	41.72
Victor T. Murillo	Independent	2,070	1.40
Total		147,804	100.00

- Philip Pichay was removed by the Supreme Court on January 26, 2016, after an electoral protest. Mary Elizabeth Ty-Delgado took office on May 23, 2016, after winning an electoral protest against Philip Pichay.

=== 2nd District ===
Candidate	Party	Votes	%
Florencio C. Garay	Liberal Party	73,282	73.65
Mario S. Alvizo	United Nationalist Alliance	26,221	26.35
Total		99,503	100.00

== Taguig ==
Candidate	Party	Votes	%
Arnel Cerafica	Liberal Party/KDT	74,814	66.53
Baby Gloria V. de Mesa	Nacionalista Party	37,636	33.47
Total		112,450	100.00

== Taguig–Pateros ==
Candidate	Party	Votes	%
Lino Edgardo S. Cayetano	Nacionalista Party	62,143	55.97
Henry Dueñas Jr.	Nationalist People's Coalition	48,881	44.03
Total		111,024	100.00

== Tarlac ==
=== 1st District ===
Candidate	Party	Votes	%
Enrique M. Cojuangco	Nationalist People's Coalition	134,218	100.00
Total		134,218	100.00

=== 2nd District ===
Candidate	Party	Votes	%
Susan A. Yap-Sulit	Nationalist People's Coalition	146,098	76.89
Josefino N. Rigor	Lakas–CMD	41,855	22.03
Ernesto S. Calma	Independent	2,047	1.08
Total		190,000	100.00

=== 3rd District ===
Candidate	Party	Votes	%
Noel L. Villanueva	Nacionalista Party	88,281	57.21
Jeci Lapus	National Unity Party	34,953	22.65
Herminio Aquino	Liberal Party	31,083	20.14
Total		154,317	100.00

== Tawi-Tawi ==
Candidate	Party	Votes	%
Ruby Sahali	Liberal Party	54,298	66.58
Hadji Anuar J. Abubakar	Nationalist People's Coalition	14,040	17.21
Ismael Abubakar Jr.	United Nationalist Alliance	12,544	15.38
Ibrahim H. Albani	Independent	677	0.83
Total		81,559	100.00

== Valenzuela ==
=== 1st District ===
Candidate	Party	Votes	%
Sherwin Gatchalian	Nationalist People's Coalition	68,612	73.92
Ritchie D. Cuadra	Lakas–CMD	24,202	26.08
Total		92,814	100.00

=== 2nd District ===
Candidate	Party	Votes	%
Magtanggol T. Gunigundo Jr	Lakas–CMD	58,332	51.02
Shalani Carla S. Soledad-Romulo	Liberal Party	55,335	48.40
Pablo L. Hernandez III	Independent	663	0.58
Total		114,330	100.00

== Zambales ==
=== 1st District ===
Candidate	Party	Votes	%
Jeffrey D. Khonghun	Nationalist People's Coalition	79,767	54.32
James J. Gordon Jr	Liberal Party	47,165	32.12
Jesus Vicente H. Magsaysay II	United Nationalist Alliance	19,901	13.55
Total		146,833	100.00

=== 2nd District ===
Candidate	Party	Votes	%
Cheryl P. Deloso-Montalla	Liberal Party	98,433	56.19
Hermogenes Omar C. Ebdane III	Sulong Zambales Party	76,742	43.81
Total		175,175	100.00

== Zamboanga City ==
=== 1st District ===
Candidate	Party	Votes	%
Celso Lobregat	Laban ng Demokratikong Pilipino/Adelante Zamboanga Party (AZAP)	43,226	43.61
Crisanto B. de la Cruz	United Nationalist Alliance/Zamboangueños for the Transformation of Zamboanga (ZTZ)	32,794	33.08
Cesar F. Climaco Jr	Independent	20,537	20.72
Chrisler T. Cabarrubias	Pwersa ng Masang Pilipino	1,927	1.94
Abdurahman S. Tagayan	Independent	640	0.65
Total		99,124	100.00

=== 2nd District ===
Candidate	Party	Votes	%
Lilia M. Nuño	Fuerza Zamboanga	33,875	34.31
Jose L. Lobregat	Laban ng Demokratikong Pilipino/Adelante Zamboanga Party (AZAP)	28,440	28.80
Manuel Jose M. Dalipe	United Nationalist Alliance/Zamboangueños for the Transformation of Zamboanga (ZTZ)	25,691	26.02
Abelardo A. Climaco Jr	Independent	8,912	9.03
Samuel F. Enesando	Lapiang Manggagawa	1,820	1.84
Total		98,738	100.00

== Zamboanga del Norte ==
=== 1st District ===
Candidate	Party	Votes	%
Seth Frederick P. Jalosjos	Nacionalista Party	51,026	50.61
Vicente Edgar A. Balisado	Liberal Party	49,803	49.39
Total		100,829	100.00

=== 2nd District ===
Candidate	Party	Votes	%
Rosendo Labadlabad	Liberal Party	112,799	60.68
Rolando E. Yebes	National Unity Party	73,095	39.32
Total		185,894	100.00

=== 3rd District ===
Candidate	Party	Votes	%
Isagani Amatong	Liberal Party	85,520	57.40
Johanna J. Parreño	Nacionalista Party	63,482	42.60
Total		149,002	100.00

== Zamboanga del Sur ==
=== 1st District ===
Candidate	Party	Votes	%
Victor Yu	Nationalist People's Coalition	150,637	60.45
Samuel S. Co	Liberal Party	98,573	39.55
Total		249,210	100.00

=== 2nd District ===
Candidate	Party	Votes	%
Aurora C. Enerio-Cerilles	Nationalist People's Coalition	104,827	62.72
Marjorie N. Jalosjos	Nacionalista Party	61,291	36.67
Rogelio G. Carbiero	Independent	1,020	0.61
Total		167,138	100.00

== Zamboanga Sibugay ==
=== 1st District ===
Candidate	Party	Votes	%
Belma Cabilao	Nacionalista Party	54,315	57.76
Wilter Palma II	Liberal Party	37,480	39.86
Sarah K. Karim	Democratic Party of the Philippines	2,074	2.21
Reynaldo N. Tecechian	Pwersa ng Masang Pilipino	160	0.17
Total		94,029	100.00

=== 2nd District ===
Candidate	Party	Votes	%
Dulce Ann K. Hofer-Santos	Liberal Party	78,100	58.93
Romeo M. Jalosjos Jr	Nacionalista Party	54,422	41.07
Total		132,522	100.00
