= 2013 Zamboanga City local elections =

Philippine election

2013 Zamboanga City mayoralty election
- May 13, 2013
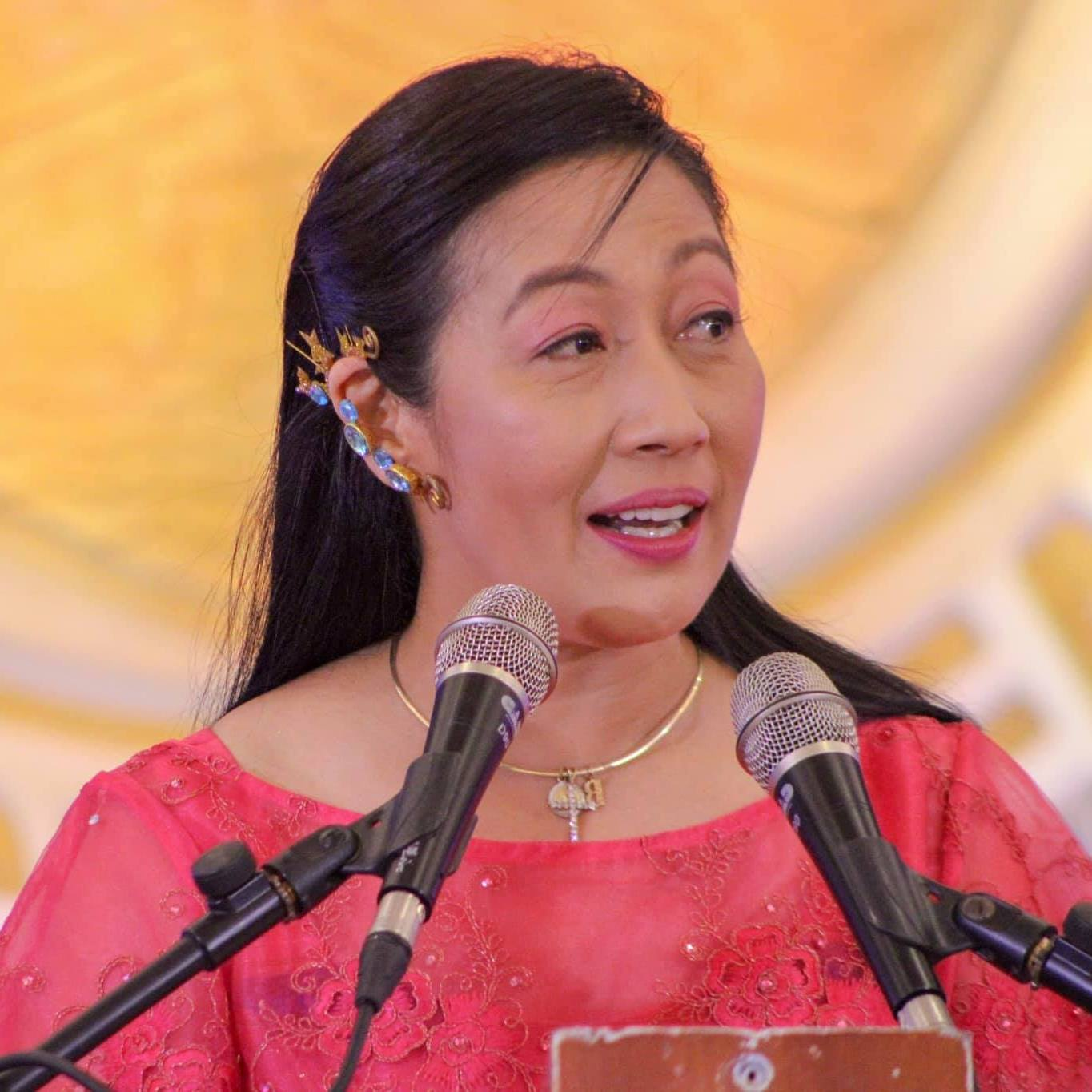

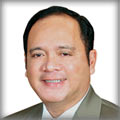
Nominee	Maria Isabelle Climaco Salazar	Erbie Fabian	Albert Cajayon
Party	Liberal	Fuerza Zamboanga	Lakas
Running mate	Cesar Iturralde	Luis Climaco
Popular vote	172,439	29,923	5,967
Percentage	77.26	13.18	2.67
Mayor before election
Celso Lobregat
LDP
Elected mayor
Maria Isabelle Climaco Salazar
Liberal

Local elections were held in Zamboanga City on May 13, 2013, within the Philippine general election. The voters elected for the elective local posts in the city: the mayor, vice mayor, and eight councilors per district.

== Summary ==
Two main coalitions posted for the control of Zamboanga City beginning mid-2012:

- The Adelante Zamboanga Party (AZAP) headed by incumbent Mayor Celso Lobregat; and
- The Zamboangueños for the Transformation of Zamboanga (ZTZ) headed by former Zamboanga del Norte congressman Romeo Jalosjos.

=== LP-LDP-AZAP ===
The AZAP coalition is composed of the local party itself and the local chapters of the Laban ng Demokratikong Pilipino and of the Liberal Party. Incumbent District II Representative Erbie Fabian is term-bounded and cannot run for another term and is poised to run for the mayorship in the next elections. But the party endorsed, with the initiative of Mayor Lobregat, incumbent District I Representative Beng Climaco for the mayorship.

==== The Split ====
Felt being junked by his former partymates in Lobregat's camp, Fabian decided to run against Climaco-Salazar under the banner of a new party, the Fuerza Zamboanga. Lobregat denied Fabian's allegations citing that Fabian confirmed that he will not run for a new post and consider retirement.

=== ZTZ-UNA ===
By the start of June 2012, former Zamboanga del Norte congressman Romeo Jalosjos Sr. announced his bid for the mayoralty in Zamboanga City. He then started to establish a non-government organization known as the Zamboangueños for the Transformation of Zamboanga (ZTZ) with a 25-point agenda aimed at transforming Zamboanga City with progress and development.

The United Nationalist Alliance fielded Jalosjos to chair the UNA local chapter in the city and Zamboanga del Norte.

==== Disqualification case ====
Representative Beng Climaco and Jomar Lobregat, the Mayor's brother filed a disqualification case against Jalosjos citing that he didn't meet the one-year residency requirement. He is also questioned that he is not qualified because of his conviction in a rape case in 1997 while he served in Congress.

On January 15, 2013, the Commission on Elections disqualified Jalosjos alongside his brother, Dominador Jalosjos who is also a candidate for governor of Zamboanga del Sur for violating the Local Government Code of 1991 which bars ex-convicts to run for office and run short of the required one-year residency in the place where a candidate can run.

== Retiring and term-limited elective officials ==
- Celso Lobregat, incumbent mayor, term-limited in 2013
- Erbie Fabian, incumbent District II Representative, term-limited in 2013
- Rodoflo Lim, incumbent District I councilor, term-limited in 2013
- Benjamin Guingona III, incumbent District II councilor, term-limited in 2013
- Reyniero Candido, incumbent District II councilor, term-limited in 2013

== Candidates ==
Notes:

- **bold** means the candidate is incumbent and running for reelection;
- italic means the candidate previously run last 2010 election either on the same post or other posts;
- **bold and italic** means the candidate is an incumbent and is running for another position.

Position		LP-LDP-AZAP Coalition Team PNoy		United Nationalist Alliance		Fuerza Zamboanga		Other parties		Independents
Mayor		Liberal	**Beng Climaco**			Nacionalista	**Erbie Fabian**	Lakas	Alberto Cajayon	
Vice Mayor		LDP	**Cesar Iturralde**	UNA	Mercy Arquiza-Fernandez	Independent	Luis Climaco			Alexander Francisco
Member of the House of Representatives	1st	LDP	**Celso Lobregat**	UNA	Crisanto dela Cruz			PMP	Chrisler Cabarrubias	Cesar Climaco Jr.; Abdurahman Tagayan
Member of the House of Representatives	2nd	AZAP	Jose Lobregat	UNA	Mannix Dalipe	Independent	**Lilia Macrohon-Nuño**	LM	Samuel Enesando	Abelardo Climaco
Member of the Zamboanga City Council	1st	Liberal	Elbert Atilano; Ahmad Sampang	UNA	**Rodolfo Bayot**; Rowland Bella; Jarah Bernardo; Antonio Blanco; **Jaime Cabato**; Jerson Monteverde; Alexis Ortega; Marlon Torres	Independent	Miguel Apostol; Joselito Bernardo; Hado Edding; **Melchor Sadain**	NPC	**Cesar Jimenez Jr.**	Armando Bucoy; Josephine Pareja; Khymer Adan Olaso; Dominador Managula; Rizaldy Montebon
Member of the Zamboanga City Council	1st	LDP	**Myra Paz Valederrosa-Abubakar**; **Luis Biel III**; Tito Espiritusanto; Charlie Mariano; **Rogelio Valesco Jr.**	UNA	**Rodolfo Bayot**; Rowland Bella; Jarah Bernardo; Antonio Blanco; **Jaime Cabato**; Jerson Monteverde; Alexis Ortega; Marlon Torres					Armando Bucoy; Josephine Pareja; Khymer Adan Olaso; Dominador Managula; Rizaldy Montebon
Member of the Zamboanga City Council	1st	AZAP	Violeta Alejandro	UNA	**Rodolfo Bayot**; Rowland Bella; Jarah Bernardo; Antonio Blanco; **Jaime Cabato**; Jerson Monteverde; Alexis Ortega; Marlon Torres					Armando Bucoy; Josephine Pareja; Khymer Adan Olaso; Dominador Managula; Rizaldy Montebon
Member of the Zamboanga City Council	2nd	Liberal	Roel Natividad; Arturo Onrubia	UNA	Mohammadnur Ajihil; **Rommel Agan**; John Dalipe; Susan delos Reyes; Al-Jihan Edding; Juan Climaco Elago II; Resurrecion Miravite; Leomyr Toribio	Independent	Gerasimo Acuña; Basilio Apolinario VII; Carlito Depositario; Roseller Enriquez; Antonio Feliciano; Eduardo Mingala			Frederick Atilano; Abubakar Hakim; John David Corpin; Nulhamdo Cegales; Bahari Camlian; Hussayin Apra; Quirino Aba; Christopher Miguel Sr.
Member of the Zamboanga City Council	2nd	LDP	**Miguel Alavar III**; Francisco Barredo; Benjamin Guingona IV; **Percival Ramos**; **Eduardo Saavedra Jr.**	UNA	Mohammadnur Ajihil; **Rommel Agan**; John Dalipe; Susan delos Reyes; Al-Jihan Edding; Juan Climaco Elago II; Resurrecion Miravite; Leomyr Toribio					Frederick Atilano; Abubakar Hakim; John David Corpin; Nulhamdo Cegales; Bahari Camlian; Hussayin Apra; Quirino Aba; Christopher Miguel Sr.
Member of the Zamboanga City Council	2nd	AZAP	**Vincent Paul Elago**	UNA	Mohammadnur Ajihil; **Rommel Agan**; John Dalipe; Susan delos Reyes; Al-Jihan Edding; Juan Climaco Elago II; Resurrecion Miravite; Leomyr Toribio					Frederick Atilano; Abubakar Hakim; John David Corpin; Nulhamdo Cegales; Bahari Camlian; Hussayin Apra; Quirino Aba; Christopher Miguel Sr.

== Results ==
The candidates for district representative, mayor, and vice mayor with the highest number of votes wins the seat; they are voted separately, therefore, they may be of different parties when elected.

=== House of Representatives election ===
==== 1st District ====
Incumbent Maria Isabelle Climaco Salazar is not running; she is running for the mayorship instead; Incumbent Mayor Celso Lobregat is her party's nominee under the coalition of LDP-LP-AZAP.

The UNA-ZTZ coalition fielded former Monsignor Crisanto dela Cruz for the post. Dela Cruz previously run for the mayorship in 2007 and for the vice-mayorship in 2010. This will be the second time where Dela Cruz and Mayor Lobregat will go against each other as they have last 2007 mayoral elections.

2013 Philippine House of Representatives election at Zamboanga City's 1st district
Party	Candidate	Votes	%
Team PNoy	Celso Lobregat	42,826	38.53%
UNA	Crisanto Dela Cruz	32,234	29.00%
Independent	Cesar Climaco Jr.	20,355	18.31%
PMP	Chrisler Cabarrubias	1,910	1.72%
Independent	Abdurahman Tagayan	639	0.57%
Turnout		98,072	88.13%
Rejected ballots		13,085	11.77%
Total votes		111,157	100.00
LDP hold			

==== 2nd District ====
Incumbent Erico Basilio Fabian is term limited and running for the mayorship instead. He then formed a local coalition known as Fuerza Zamboanga yielding District II Councilor Lilia Nuño to replace him.

The AZAP coalition nominates Mayor Lobregat's brother, Jose Lobregat, to run for the post.

The ZTZ coalition recruited former City Vice-Mayor Mannix Dalipe to run for the post.

2013 Philippine House of Representatives election at Zamboanga City's 2nd district
Party	Candidate	Votes	%
Fuerza Zamboanga	Lilia Nuño	33,475	29.88%
Team PNoy	Jose Lobregat	27,912	24.91%
UNA	Mannix Dalipe	25,242	22.53%
Independent	Abelardo Climaco	8,783	7.84%
LM	Samuel Enesando	1,792	1.60%
Turnout		97,204	86.76%
Rejected ballots		14,835	13.24%
Total votes		112,039	100.00
Fuerza Zamboanga hold			

=== Mayoral elections ===
Incumbent Mayor Celso Lobregat is his third consecutive term and is barred to run for another term. He ran for Congress representing the First Legislative District.

Zamboanga City mayoral election
Party	Candidate	Votes	%
Team PNoy	Beng Climaco	172,439	77.26%
Fuerza Zamboanga	Erbie Fabian	29,423	13.18%
Lakas	Albert Cajayon	5,967	2.67%
Turnout		207,829	93.12%
Rejected ballots		15,367	6.88%
Total votes		223,196	100.00
Liberal hold			

=== Vice-mayoral elections ===
Incumbent Vice-Mayor Cesar Iturralde is running for reelection against former Councilor Luis Climaco and former Dapitan councilor Mercy Arquiza-Fernandez.

Zamboanga City vice mayoral election
Party	Candidate	Votes	%
Team PNoy	Cesar Iturralde (incumbent)	100,430	45.00%
Fuerza Zamboanga	Luis Climaco	66,784	29.92%
UNA	Mercy Arquiza-Fernandez	20,574	9.22%
Independent	Alexander Lisito Francisco	2,496	1.32%
Turnout		190,284	85.25%
Rejected ballots		32,912	14.75%
Total votes		223,196	100.00
Liberal hold			

=== City Council elections ===
Each of Zamboanga City's two legislative districts elects eight councilors to the City Council. The eight candidates with the highest number of votes wins the seats per district.

2013 Zamboanga City Council election
- May 13, 2013

All 8 seats from each of Zamboanga City's two legislative districts 9 seats needed for a majority
	Majority party	Minority party	Third party
Leader	Celso Lobregat	Romeo Jalosjos Sr.	Cesar Jimenez, Jr.
Party	LDP	UNA	NPC
Alliance	Team PNoy	UNA	Independent
Leader's seat	1st District	2nd District	1st District
Seats before	11	0	5
Seats won	8	3	1
Seat change	▼3	▲3	▼4
	Fourth party	Fifth party	Sixth party
Leader	Erico Basilio Fabian	Maria Isabelle Climaco Salazar	Jose Lobregat
Party	Nacionalista	Liberal	AZAP
Alliance	Fuerza Zamboanga	Team PNoy	Team PNoy
Leader's seat	2nd District	1st District	2nd District
Seats before	0	0	0
Seats won	1	1	1
Seat change	▲1	▲1	▲1

Coalition	Mayoral/vice mayoral candidate	Total votes		Total seats	
Coalition	Mayoral/vice mayoral candidate	Total	%	Total	%
Team PNoy	Beng Climaco			10	55.6%
UNA	Romeo Jalosjos Sr.			3	16.7%
Fuerza Zamboanga	Erbie Fabian			1	5.6%
NPC	None			1	5.6%
Independents	Varies			1	5.6%
Total valid votes cast			N/A		
Total turnout					
Total partisan seats				16	88.9%
Seat for Association of Barangay Captains President				1	5.6%
Seat for Association of Sangguniang Kabataan chairmen President				1	5.6%
Total non-partisan seats				2	11.1%
Total seats				18	100.0%

==== 1st District ====
Summary of the May 13, 2013 Zamboanga City Council election results
#	Candidate	Coalition	Party	Votes	%	Swing (Note: Change in percentage point as compared from the 2010.)
1	Melchor Sadain (incumbent)	Fuerza Zamboanga	Independent	55,984	%	
2	Rogelio Valesco Jr. (incumbent)	Team PNoy	LDP	53,979	%	
3	Cesar Jimenez Jr. (incumbent)	not affiliated	NPC	52,873	%	
4	Charlie Mariano	Team PNoy	LDP	51,277	%	
5	Luis Biel III (incumbent)	Team PNoy	LDP	49,798	%	
6	Josephine Pareja	not affiliated	Independent	47,798	%	
7	Myra Paz Valderrosa-Abubakar (incumbent)	Team PNoy	LDP	46,691	%	
8	Rodolfo Bayot (incumbent)	UNA	UNA	45,691	%	
9	Jaime Cabato (incumbent)	UNA	UNA	45,564	%	
10	Elbert Atilano	Team PNoy	Liberal	41,222	%	
11	Hado Edding	Fuerza Zamboanga	Independent	24,724	%	
12	Ahmad Sampang	Team PNoy	Liberal	23,902	%	
13	Tito Espiritusanto	Team PNoy	LDP	21,805	%	
14	Antonio Blanco	UNA	UNA	15,021	%	
15	Violeta Alejandro	Team PNoy	AZAP	12,911	%	
16	Alexis Ortega	UNA	UNA	12,653	%	
17	Jarah Bernardo Romuar	UNA	UNA	10,791	%	
18	Joselito Bernardo	Fuerza Zamboanga	Independent	10,702	%	
19	Miguel Apostol	Fuerza Zamboanga	Independent	10,171	%	
20	Jerson Monteverde	UNA	UNA	8,085	%	
21	Armando Bucoy	Not affiliated	Independent	6,215	%	
22	Marlon Torres	UNA	UNA	6,142	%	
23	Khymer Adan Olaso	Not affiliated	Independent	4,936	%	
24	Rowland Bella	UNA	UNA	3,879	%	
25	Rizaldy Montebon	Not affiliated	Lakas	3,760	%	
26	Dominador Managula	Not affiliated	Independent	1,717	%	
Certificates of canvass already canvassed						
Total turnout						▲1.29%
Total votes					N/A	
Registered voters						▲2.80%

==== 2nd District ====
Summary of the May 13, 2013 Zamboanga City Council election results
#	Candidate	Coalition	Party	Votes	%	Swing (Note: Change in percentage point as compared from the 2010.)
1	Roel Natividad	Team PNoy	Liberal	53,968	8.41%	
2	Benjamin Guingona IV	Team PNoy	LDP	49,696	6.93%	
3	Miguel Alavar III (incumbent)	Team PNoy	LDP	43,955	6.74%	
4	Eduardo Saavedra Jr. (incumbent)	Team PNoy	LDP	42,792	6.57%	
5	Juan Climaco Elago II	UNA	UNA	42,653	6.73%	
6	Percival Ramos (incumbent)	Team PNoy	LDP	38,494	5.74%	
7	Rommel Agan (incumbent)	UNA	UNA	37,514	6.09%	
8	Vincent Paul Elago (incumbent)	Team PNoy	AZAP	36,213	5.66%	
9	John Dalipe	UNA	UNA	35,506	5.57%	
10	Francisco Barredo	Team PNoy	LDP	34,372	5.34%	
11	Al-Jihan Edding	UNA	UNA	35,227	5.34%	
12	Susan delos Reyes	UNA	UNA	29,083	4.52%	
13	Gerasimo Acuña	Fuerza Zamboanga	Independent	25,537	4.05%	
14	Arturo Onrubia	Team PNoy	Liberal	24,612	3.93%	
15	Frederick Atilano	Not affiliated	Independent	14,538	2.28%	
16	Abubakar Hakim	Not affiliated	Independent	11,545	1.66%	
17	Basilio Apolinario VII	Fuerza Zamboanga	Independent	11,484	1.68%	
18	Loemyr Toribio	UNA	UNA	10,901	1.57%	
19	Roseller Enriquez	Fuerza Zamboanga	Independent	10,828	1.77%	
20	Resurrecion Miravite	UNA	UNA	9,848	1.58%	
21	John David Corpin	Not affiliated	Independent	9,621	1.45%	
22	Mohammadnur Ajihil	UNA	UNA	8,641	1.28%	
23	Antonio Feliciano	Fuerza Zamboanga	Independent	5,357	0.88%	
24	Carlito Depositario	Fuerza Zamboanga	Independent	5,200	0.85%	
25	Nulhamdo Cegales	Not affiliated	Independent	4,817	0.70%	
26	Bahari Camlian	Not affiliated	Independent	4,739	0.69%	
27	Hussayin Apra	Not affiliated	Independent	4,526	0.66%	
28	Eduardo Mingala	Fuerza Zamboanga	Independent	4,127	0.58%	
29	Quirino Aba	Not affiliated	Independent	2,743	0.41%	
30	Christopher Miguel Sr.	Not affiliated	Independent	2,153	0.32%	
Certificates of canvass already canvassed						
Total turnout						▲1.29%
Total votes				64,119	N/A	
Registered voters						▲2.80%

== Aftermath ==
=== Proclamation ===
As the election unofficial results found that Climaco was leading by a wide margin, Fabian announced his concession and congratulates Climaco for winning the election. “I concede defeat and I would like to congratulate my dear friend Beng Climaco,” Fabian said in a press statement. On May 14, 2013, Climaco was proclaimed winner by the City Board of Canvassers in the mayoralty elections. She also laid out her plans for the city which includes the solution to solve the city power crisis and the peace and order situation.

District II Representative-elect Lilia Macrohon-Nuño also urged the people of Zamboanga to move on and discuss what is best for the city. She also revived the issue of creating a third congressional district for the city in which the city has more than 770,000 people. According to the 1987 Philippine Constitution, each district shall represent 250,000. Currently, the city is represented twice in the House of Representatives. A previous move by then Congresswoman Climaco was made by filing a bill to Congress creating the said district but was blocked by the majority of the members of Zamboanga City Council.

=== Cabato electoral protest ===
After the proclamation of all the councilors of District I, outgoing incumbent Councilor Jaime Cabato who landed on the 8th spot announced his intention to file an electoral protest against his own partymate, Rudy Bayot who landed on the 7th spot and against the administration party bet, Myra Paz Valderrosa. Cabato was a former member of the administration-led party, the Laban ng Demokratikong Pilipino until he switched sides with then mayoralty candidate, Romeo Jalosjos citing the fact that he disagreed with the candidate line-up of the LDP.

=== Taluksangay issue ===
Jose Augustus Villano, chairman of the Zamboanga chapter of Legal Network for Peaceful Election (LENTE), said his group found that of the 847 registered person with disabilities (PWDs) voters in Zamboanga City, 505 or almost 60 percent are from Barangay Taluksangay. Taluksangay is under the control of the Nuños which Lilia, one of its powerful members won the congressional race in District II.

Villano himself observed voting at the five clustered precincts of Taluksangay. He immediately noticed that almost all voters, whether they appeared to have a disability or not, were helped by a small group of people stationed inside the precinct. When Villalon asked election officers about them, he was told they were “liners” there to assist PWDs. LENTE records show that 80 to 90 percent of all who voted were assisted. Villano thinks that the people assisted might have been illiterate rather than PWDs. “I asked them in both Tagalog and in the native dialect Tausug and they understood. I asked them who they want to vote for and they pointed at the names.” When he asked the voters how they were related to the “liners,” they replied, “Sila ang magvo-vote para sa amin (They were the ones who voted for us).” When Villano told the election officers that this was illegal, the Board of Election Inspectors replied that she cannot assist the voters herself because she is "busy".

Despite its small voting population, Taluksangay was a point of contention during the campaign period. Jomar Lobregat's party, Adelante Zamboanga, claims that they were not allowed to post their materials in there. In a news item in Zamboanga Times on April 14, Adelante Zamboanga team coordinator Rudy Lim said that when he asked Taluksangay barangay chairman Abdurahman Nuño if they can conduct a meeting in Taluksangay, Nuño replied, “No deal."

Abdurahman Nuño is the husband of Lilia and sits on the city council ex-officio and is president of the Association of Barangay Captains.

== See also ==
- Philippine House of Representatives elections in the Zamboanga Peninsula, 2013
- 2013 Philippine general election
