= Aklan Provincial Board =

Legislative body of the province of Aklan, Philippines

Aklan Provincial Board Sangguniang Panlalawigan ng Aklan

Type
- Type: Unicameral
- Term limits: 3 terms (9 years)

Leadership
- Presiding Officer: Dexter M. Calizo, Lakas-CMD since June 30, 2025

Structure
- Seats: 13 board members 1 ex officio presiding officer
- Political groups: Lakas-CMD (5) PFP (4) Liberal (1) Nonpartisan (2)
- Length of term: 3 years
- Authority: Local Government Code of the Philippines

Elections
- Voting system: Plurality-at-large (regular members); Indirect election (ex officio members)
- Last election: May 12, 2025
- Next election: May 15, 2028

Meeting place
- Session Hall, Sangguniang Panlalawigan Building, Kalibo, Aklan

The Aklan Provincial Board is the Sangguniang Panlalawigan (provincial legislature) of the Philippine province of Aklan.

The members are elected via plurality-at-large voting: the province is divided into two districts, each sending five members to the provincial board; the electorate votes for five members, with the five candidates with the highest number of votes being elected. The vice governor is the ex officio presiding officer, and only votes to break ties. The vice governor is elected via the plurality voting system province-wide.

== District apportionment ==
Elections	No. of seats per district		Ex officio seats	Total seats
Elections	1st	2nd	Ex officio seats	Total seats
2004–13	5	5	3	13

== List of members ==
An additional three ex officio members are the presidents of the provincial chapters of the Association of Barangay Captains, the Councilors' League, the Sangguniang Kabataan provincial president; the municipal and city (if applicable) presidents of the Association of Barangay Captains, Councilor's League and Sangguniang Kabataan, shall elect amongst themselves their provincial presidents which shall be their representatives at the board.

=== Current members ===
These are the members after the 2025 local elections and 2023 barangay and SK elections:

- Vice Governor: Dexter M. Calizo (Lakas-CMD)

Seat	Board member	Party	Start of term	End of term
1st district	Mark Ace L. Bautista	PFP	June 30, 2022	June 30, 2028
1st district	Reynaldo M. Quimbo	Lakas-CMD	June 30, 2025	June 30, 2028
1st district	Mark V. Quimpo	Lakas-CMD	June 30, 2022	June 30, 2028
1st district	Teddy C. Tupas	Lakas-CMD	June 30, 2022	June 30, 2028
1st district	Apolinar C. Cleope	PFP	June 30, 2022	June 30, 2028
2nd district	Vacant (Note: Jose Ciceron Lorenzo A. Haresco (Nacionalista) resigned on July 30, 2025.)			
2nd district	Romeo M. Dalisay	PFP	June 30, 2022	June 30, 2028
2nd district	Bayani M. Cordova	Lakas-CMD	June 30, 2022	June 30, 2028
2nd district	Bob Augusto F. Legaspi	Liberal	June 30, 2025	June 30, 2028
2nd district	Jupiter Aelred G. Gallenero	PFP	June 30, 2022	June 30, 2028
ABC	Ralf A. Iquina	Nonpartisan	October 30, 2023	January 1, 2026
PCL	Nestor Francisco M. Inocencio (Interim)	Lakas-CMD	July 1, 2025	June 30, 2028
SK	Edmundo "EJ" M. Tolentino	Nonpartisan	October 30, 2023	

=== Vice Governor ===
Election year	Name	Party
1992	Liberato Ibadlit	NPC
1995	Jean Rodriguez	LDP
1998	Jean Rodriguez	LAMMP
2001	Jean Rodriguez	LDP
2004	Ronquillo Tolentino	Lakas
2007	Gabrielle Calizo-Quimpo	Nacionalista
2010	Gabrielle Calizo-Quimpo	Nacionalista
2013	Gabrielle Calizo-Quimpo	Nacionalista
2016	Reynaldo Quimpo	Nacionalista
2019	Reynaldo Quimpo	Nacionalista
2022	Reynaldo Quimpo	Nacionalista
2025	Dexter M. Calizo	Lakas

=== 1st District ===
Election year	Member (party)	Member (party)	Member (party)	Member (party)	Member (party)
2004	Stevens Fuentes (Liberal)	Daisy Briones (Lakas)	Plaridel Morania (LDP)	Santiago Regalado (Lakas)	Eriberto Venus (Lakas)
2007	Nemesio Neron (Lakas)	Daisy Briones (Lakas)	Plaridel Morania (LDP)	Rodson Mayor (Lakas)	Jean Rodriguez (Lakas)
2010	Nemesio Neron (Lakas-Kampi)	Daisy Briones (Lakas-Kampi)	Raymar Rebaldo (Bagumbayan-VNP)	Rodson Mayor (Lakas-Kampi)	Jean Rodriguez (Lakas-Kampi)
2013	Plaridel Morania (Liberal)	Lillian Tirol (Liberal)	Emmanuel dela Cruz (Nacionalista)	Rodson Mayor (Lakas)	Harry Sucgang (UNA)
2016	Nemesio Neron (Liberal)	Lillian Tirol (Liberal)	Emmanuel dela Cruz (Nacionalista)	Immanuel Sodusta (NPC)	Harry Sucgang (UNA)
2019	Nemesio Neron (PDP–Laban)	Juris Sucro (PDP–Laban)	Emmanuel dela Cruz (Nacionalista)	Immanuel Sodusta (NPC)	Harry Sucgang (NPC)
2022	Nemesio Neron (NPC)	Teddy Tupas (PDP–Laban)	Mark Quimpo (Nacionalista)	Mark Ace Bautista (Nacionalista)	Apolinar Cleope (NPC)
2025	Mark Ace L. Bautista (PFP)	Apolinar C. Cleope (PFP)	Reynaldo M. Quimbo (Lakas)	Mark V. Quimpo (Lakas)	Teddy C. Tupas (Lakas)

=== 2nd District ===
Election year	Member (party)	Member (party)	Member (party)	Member (party)	Member (party)
2004	Pedro Garcia (Lakas)	Gerick Templonuevo (Liberal)	Selwyn Ibarreta (Liberal)	Jose Yap (Lakas)	Ramon Gelito (PDP-LABAN)
2007	Pedro Garcia (Lakas)	Gerick Templonuevo (Liberal)	Selwyn Ibarreta (Liberal)	Jose Yap (Lakas)	Ramon Gelito (PDP-LABAN)
2010	Victor Manuel Garcia (PMP)	Gerick Templonuevo (Lakas-Kampi)	Selwyn Ibarreta (Lakas-Kampi)	Phoebe Cabagnot (PMP)	Jose Enrique Miraflores (Lakas-Kampi)
2013	Ramon Gelito (Liberal)	Esel Flores (Liberal)	Roberto Garcia (UNA)	Nelson Santamaria (Liberal)	Jose Enrique Miraflores (Liberal)
2016	Ramon Gelito (Liberal)	Esel Flores (Liberal)	Jay Tejada (Liberal)	Nelson Santamaria (Liberal)	Miguel Miraflores (Liberal)
2019	Nelson Santamaria (PDP–Laban)	Esel Flores (PDP–Laban)	Jay Tejada (PDP–Laban)	Ramon Gelito (PDP–Laban)	Jose Miraflores (PDP–Laban)
2022	Romeo Dalisay (Nacionalista)	Jupiter Gallenero (PDP–Laban)	Jay Tejada (PDP–Laban)	Bayani Cordova (Nacionalista)	Plaridel Solidum (PDP–Laban)
2025	Bayani M. Cordova (Lakas)	Romeo M. Dalisay (PFP)	Jupiter Aelred G. Gallenero (PFP)	Jose Ciceron Lorenzo A. Haresco (Nacionalista) (Note: Resigned on July 30, 2025.)	Bob Augusto F. Legaspi (Liberal)
