= Fuerza Zamboanga =

Political coalition in the Philippines

Fuerza Zamboanga is a coalition of independent candidates in Zamboanga City running for the local elections in 2013. Formed by Congressman Erbie Fabian by late 2012, the party pursues a 10-point agenda in solving the crisis in the city.

== History ==
In the height of the election fever in Zamboanga City, two parties poised as the main contenders in the incoming local elections:

- the Adelante Zamboanga Party, in coalition with the local chapters of Laban ng Demokratikong Pilipino and the ruling Liberal Party with the leadership of Congresswoman Beng Climaco; and
- the Zamboangueños for the Transformation of Zamboanga (ZTZ), in coalition with the local chapter of United Nationalist Alliance headed by former Zamboanga del Norte congressman Romeo Jalosjos.

Many speculated that incumbent District II Representative Erbie Fabian will run for the mayorship in the next elections under the banner of the LP-LDP-AZAP Coalition. But the party endorsed, with the initiative of Mayor Celso Lobregat, incumbent District I Representative Beng Climaco for the mayorship.

Felt being junked by his former partymates in Lobregat's camp, Fabian decided to run against Climaco-Salazar under the banner of a new party, the Fuerza Zamboanga. Lobregat denied Fabian's allegations citing that Fabian confirmed that he will not run for a new post and consider retirement.

== Candidates ==
- Mayor: Erbie Fabian
- Vice-Mayor: former City Councilor Luis Climaco
- Second District Representative: District II Councilor Lilia Nuño
- District I Councilors:
  - Incumbent District I Councilor Mel Sadain
  - former ZAMCELCO President Mike Apostol
  - Hado Edding
  - Joe Bernardo
- District II Councilors:
  - Gerry Acuña
  - Antonio Feliciano
  - Max Enriquez
  - Mako Apolinario
  - Ed Mingala
  - Dr. Lito Depositario
