= Phoebe Cabagnot =

Filipina politician

Phoebe Cabagnot The Honorable
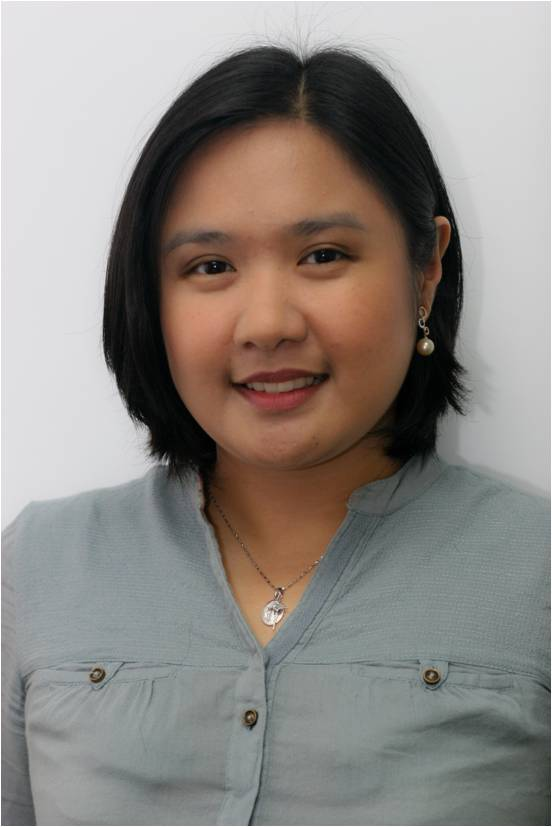
- SP Ning Legaspi Cabagnot

Member of the Aklan Provincial Board from the 2nd district
- In office June 30, 2010 – June 30, 2013

Personal details
- Born: Phoebe Clarice Legaspi-Cabagnot; 6 October 1978 (age 48) Quezon City, Metro Manila, Philippines
- Party: Independent (from 2012); PMP (until 2012)
- Education: University of the Philippines Diliman
- Occupation: Politician

Phoebe Clarice "Ning" Legaspi Cabagnot (born 6 October 1978), is a Filipina politician who served as member of the Sangguniang Panlalawigan (Provincial Board) for the Western District of Aklan, Philippines from 2010 to 2013.

== Advocacy ==
Cabangot’s main legislative priorities are: Poverty Reduction, Education, Energy, Food Security, Health and Eco-Tourism. She supports Gawad Kalinga as Sponsor for Poor Children for over six years, and the Philippine Red Cross with assistance for victims of Typhoon Ondoy and Typhoon Pablo.

In Aklan, she supports STAC-Kalibo (Stimulation and Therapeutic Activity Center) by promoting increased awareness of the needs of special children. She also donates funds to the center so that the latter will be able to help special children uplift their condition through therapy and specialized educational learning methods. She celebrated her birthday with the children of STAC in 2010.

== Early life ==
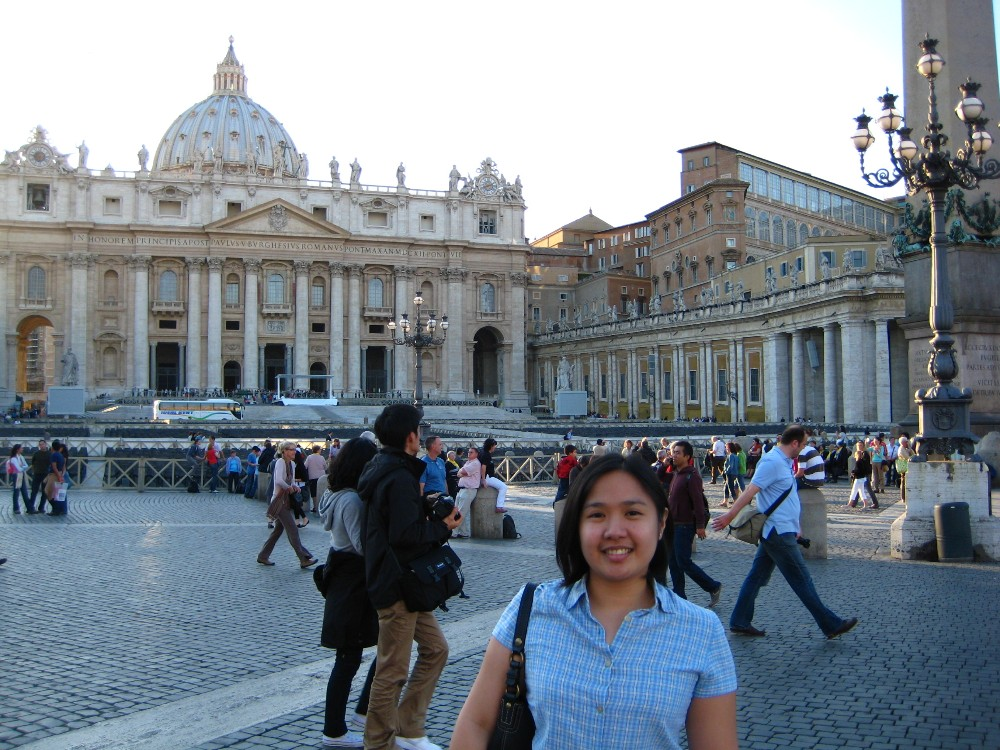
Cabangot at St. Peter's Basilica in Vatican City

Cabangot was born into a long line of politicians, her father being Frenz Gomez Cabagnot, a businessman, and her mother Atty. Corazon "Nining" Tumbokon Legaspi-Cabagnot, a former Governor of Aklan and Vice-Consul to Guam. Ning's maternal grandfather was Dr. José Baltazar Legaspi, a former Governor and Congressman of Aklan, married to Rafaelina Concepción Tumbokon (National Board of Examiners, Pharmacy). Her maternal great-grandfather was Dr. Rafael Silva Tumbokon, a former Assemblyman for Capiz and Undersecretary at the Department of Health married to teacher Pilar Mijares Concepción. Cabagnot spent her early childhood overseas as her mother, former Governor Corazon L. Cabagnot, was a diplomat stationed in Guam.

== Education ==
=== Elementary ===
Her elementary education began at Santa Barbara Catholic School in Dededo on Guam, with a brief stay at St. Mary's College in Quezon City, and continuing at Saint Joseph's College of Quezon City after the family returned to the Philippines in 1988. She and her siblings moved to Aklan as their mother was governor in 1989. She then continued the remaining two years of elementary at the Kalibo Pilot Elementary School under the special or highest section for grades 5 and 6.

=== High school ===
Cabagnot qualified for a seat in the star section of the Science Development High School of Aklan (now the Regional Science High School for Region VI). She spent her first two years of high school in SDHSA and then transferred to Saint Joseph's College of Quezon City, where she finished high school.

=== University ===
Shortly after leaving Aklan, Cabangot was reunited with some of her friends and classmates who were also accepted to the University of the Philippines Diliman. She completed her Bachelor of Arts Degree in Communication Research in the year 1999, and while there championed the cause of various students' clubs and organizations.

Club/Organization	Role / Position Held
UP Tomo-Kai – Philippine-Japanese Friendship Club	Finance Committee Head
UP Student Catholic Action	Member, Cell Supervisor
UP Hubeag it mga Akeanon	Member
UP Junior Marketing Association	External Committee Member
UP Mass Communicators' Organization	Finance Committee Member
UP Anthropological Society	Member

== Private career ==
As a fresh graduate in 1999, she worked in various multinational firms in the private sector. She has worked extensively as an IT Project Manager in a variety of global and regional projects whose clients are based in Europe, the US, Central America, Japan and Singapore. Her global experience also attests to her being based for projects in Singapore, Japan and the United States of America.

== Political career ==
=== Provincial Board Member Achievements ===
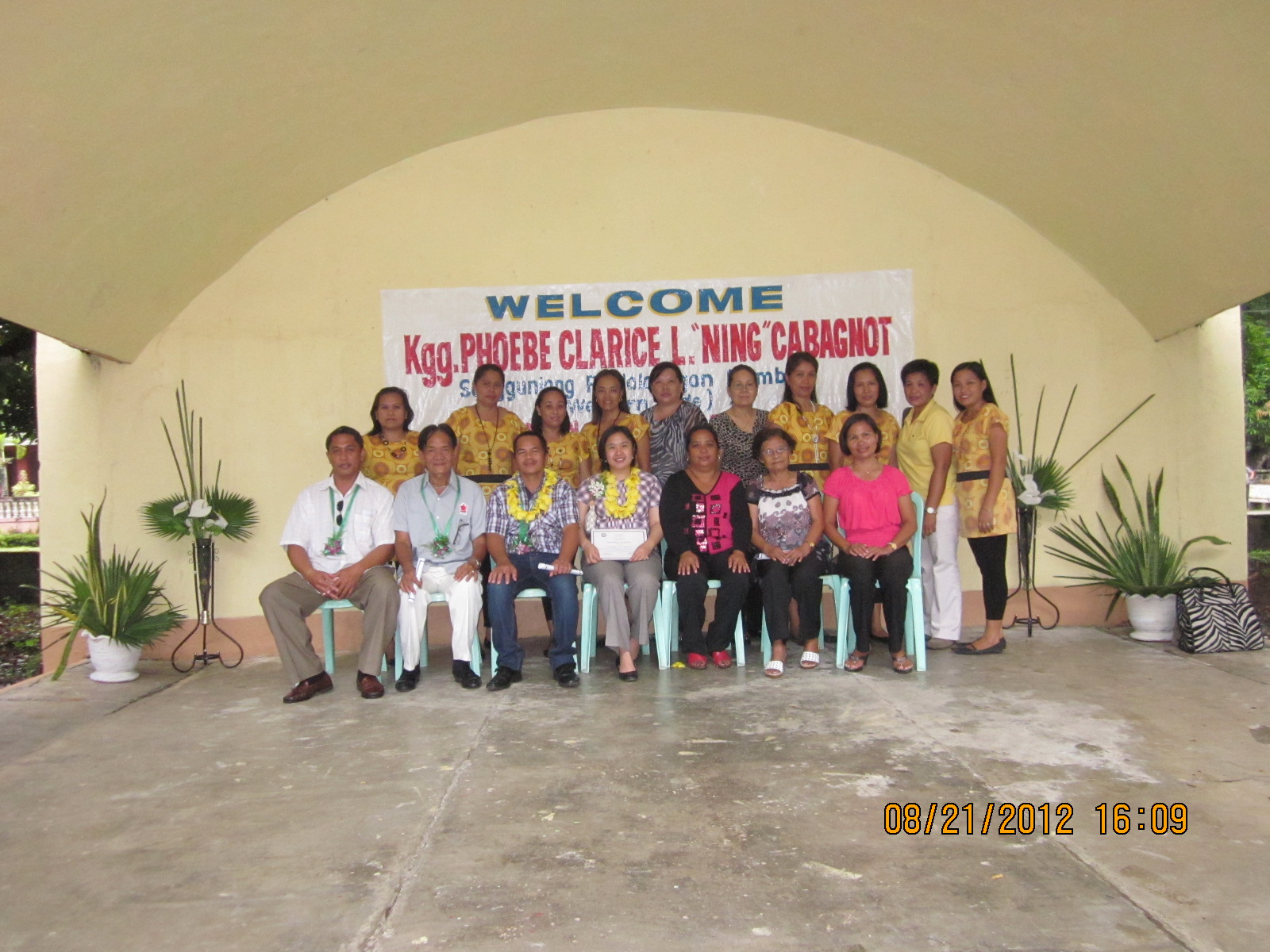
Cabangot at an event in Numancia, Aklan

Ning's achievements as Member of the Aklan Provincial Board from 2010 to 2013 include:

- 141 projects for both Eastern and Western Districts of Aklan
- More than 1,730 poor patients helped financially for both Eastern and Western Districts of Aklan
- 41 resolutions authored/co-authored. This includes Resolution No. 2011 – 056, directing the Committee on Human Resources and Committee on Appropriations, Budget and Finance to conduct an investigation, in aid of legislation, the non-remittance of at least ₱1,700,000.00 in contributions of Provincial Capitol employees to the Government Service Insurance System (GSIS), as supported by Republic Act No. 8291 (the GSIS Act of 1997)
- 5 ordinances authored/co-authored

=== Committee Leadership and Participation ===
Committee	Leadership / Participation
Labor and Employment	Chairman
Appropriations, Budget and Finance and Ways and Means	Member
Health and Social Services	Member
Education, Culture, Science and Technology	Member
Energy, Public Utilities, Transportation & Facilities	Member
Cooperatives, Food, Agriculture and Environmental Protection	Member
Tourism, Trade, Industry and Commerce	Member

=== Bid for Congress ===
In the 2013 midterm elections, Cabagnot ran as an independent candidate for Representative of the former Lone District of Aklan.
