= 2010 Bohol local elections =

Philippine election

2010 Bohol gubernatorial elections
← 2007	May 10, 2010	2013 →
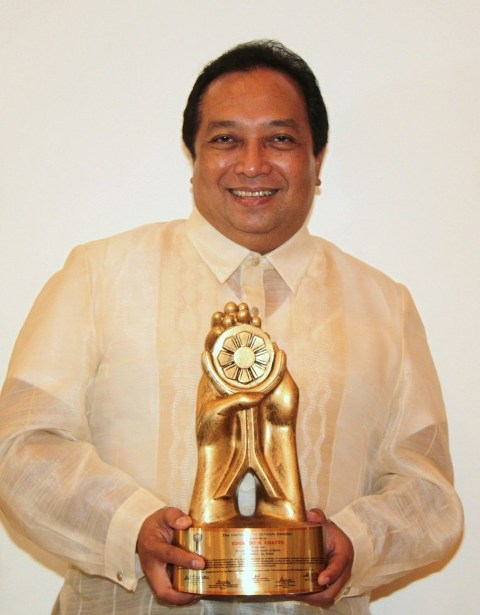

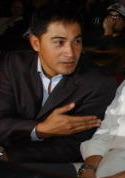
Nominee	Edgardo Chatto	Julius Caesar Herrera	Cesar Montano
Party	Lakas–Kampi	Nacionalista	Liberal
Running mate	Concepcion Lim	Tomas Abapo Jr.	Elpidio Jala
Popular vote	218,560	162,510	149,771
Percentage	40.64	30.22	27.85
Governor before election
Erico Aumentado
Lakas–Kampi
Elected Governor
Edgardo Chatto
Lakas–Kampi

Local elections were held in the province of Bohol on May 10, 2010, as part of the 2010 general election. Voters elected candidates for all local positions: a city or town mayor, vice mayor and town councilors, three to four members of the Sangguniang Panlalawigan, the vice-governor, governor, and representatives for the three district of Bohol. Bohol had posted an approximate total of 736,468 eligible voters based on the latest count after the deadline set on October 31, 2009, compared to a total of 695,445 voters in the 2007 election. A total of 610,494, or 82.89%, cast their votes during the election day.

The administration Lakas-Kampi-CMD bets for the top provincial posts made a sweeping victory in all the three congressional districts as the first automated elections drew the final results. Edgardo Chatto and his running mate, former provincial board member Concepcion Lim, won with a remarkable margins over rivals. The three congressional seats in the province were also won by Lakas-Kampi-CMD candidates, namely former Gov. Rene Relampagos for the first district, Gov. Erico Aumentado for the second district and former Department of Agriculture Secretary Arthur Yap for the third district.

== Results ==
The candidates for governor and vice governor with the highest number of votes wins the seat. They are voted separately, and therefore may be from different parties when elected.

=== Gubernatorial election results ===
Parties are as stated in their certificate of candidacies. The total number of voters was 610,494.

Bohol gubernatorial election
Party	Candidate	Votes	%
Lakas–Kampi	Edgardo Chatto	218,560	40.64
Nacionalista	Julius Caesar Herrera	162,510	30.22
Liberal	Cesar Montano	149,771	27.85
PGRP	Eunice Cabillo-Campo	5,304	0.99
Independent	Jetur Ramada	1,585	0.29
Total votes		537,730	100.00
Lakas–Kampi gain from Nacionalista			

=== Vice gubernatorial election results ===
Parties are as stated in their certificate of candidacies. The total number of voters was 610,494.

Bohol vice gubernatorial election
Party	Candidate	Votes	%
Lakas–Kampi	Concepcion Lim	169,363	35.35
Nacionalista	Tomas Abapo, Jr.	158,078	33.00
Liberal	Elpidio Jala	137,516	28.70
Independent	Cresencio Alturas	14,110	2.95
Total votes		479,067	100.00
Lakas–Kampi gain from Nacionalista			

=== Congressional elections ===
Each of Bohol's three legislative districts had elections for the House of Representatives. The candidate with the highest number of votes wins the seat.

==== 1st District, Candidates for Congressman ====
Edgar M. Chatto (Lakas-Kampi-CMD) was the incumbent, but ineligible for re-election because he was already in his third consecutive term. Former governor Rene Relampagos ran in his place under the Laban ng Demokratikong Pilipino, and Lakas-Kampi-CMD also supported his candidacy.

Philippine House of Representatives election at Bohol's 1st district
Party	Candidate	Votes	%
LDP	Rene Relampagos	92,220	50.57
Liberal	Edgar Kapirig	45,561	24.98
NPC	Oscar Glovasa	43,674	23.95
Independent	Mario Magat Jr.	920	0.50
Total votes		182,375	100.00
LDP gain from Liberal			

==== 2nd District, Candidates for Congressman ====
Roberto Cajes was the incumbent, but ineligible for re-election since he was already in his third consecutive term. Lakas-Kampi-CMD initially nominated Erico B. Aumentado as their candidate, but Aumentado was expelled from the party because of his alleged association with Manny Villar, the presidential nominee of the rival Nacionalista Party. Lakas-Kampi-CMD then sent a certificate of nomination to incumbent congressman Cajes' wife Judith.

Philippine House of Representatives election at Bohol's 2nd district
Party	Candidate	Votes	%
Lakas–Kampi	Erico B. Aumentado	94,017	57.46
Independent	Judith Cajes	57,874	35.37
Liberal	Danilo Mendez	9,537	35.37
PMP	Rolando Andy Manatad	2,193	1.34
Total votes		163,621	100.00
Lakas–Kampi gain from Liberal			

==== 3rd District, Candidate for Congressman ====
Adam Relson Jala (Lakas-Kampi-CMD) was the incumbent but decided not to run for a second term. Instead, he ran for provincial vice governorship but then dropped his candidacy to support his uncle, Elpidio Jala, who was also running for vice governor. Secretary of Agriculture Arthur Yap ran unopposed, the only cabinet official not facing opposition.

Philippine House of Representatives election at Bohol's 3rd district
Party	Candidate	Votes	%
Lakas–Kampi	Arthur Yap	136,164	100.00
Total votes		136,164	100.00

=== Sangguniang Panlalawigan elections ===
Both the 1st and 2nd District of Bohol elected three Sangguniang Panlalawigan, or provincial board members. The 3rd District, with the highest population, elected four board members. The candidates with the highest number of votes win the seats allocated for each district, with the number of winning candidates per district equal to the number of seats that district sends to the provincial legislature.

Party	Votes	%	Seats
Lakas Kampi CMD	457,988	37.18	5
Nacionalista Party	424,481	34.46	3
Liberal Party	151,185	12.27	0
PDP–Laban	80,929	6.57	1
Independent	117,380	9.53	1
Ex officio seats			3
Total	1,231,963	100.00	13
Total votes	610,494	–	

==== 1st District ====
- City: Tagbilaran City
- Municipality: Alburquerque, Antequera, Baclayon, Balilihan, Calape, Catigbian, Corella, Cortes, Dauis, Loon, Maribojoc, Panglao, Sikatuna, Tubigon
- Population (2007): 400,026

Parties are as stated in their certificate of candidacies.

Bohol 1st District Sangguniang Panlalawigan election
Party	Candidate	Votes	%
PDP–Laban	Cesar Tomas Lopez	80,929	20.16
Lakas–Kampi	Abeleon Damalerio	64,248	20.00
Lakas–Kampi	Venzencio Arcamo	55,196	16.0
Nacionalista	Danilo Bantugan	52,151	12.99
Nacionalista	Doris Dinorog-Obeña	41,708	10.39
Independent	Raul Barbarona	41,194	10.26
Liberal	Nemesio Monton	37,268	9.28
Liberal	Cirilo Esperanza Jr.	14,114	3.52
Liberal	Zeus Manuel Descallar	9,846	2.45
Independent	Rodolfo Cañizares	4,776	1.19
Total votes		201,884	100.00

==== 2nd District ====
- City: none
- Municipality: Bien Unido, Buenavista, Clarin, Dagohoy, Danao, Getafe, Inabanga, Pres. Carlos P. Garcia, Sagbayan, San Isidro, San Miguel, Talibon, Trinidad, Ubay
- Population (2007): 404,026

Parties are as stated in their certificate of candidacies.

Bohol 2nd District Sangguniang Panlalawigan election
Party	Candidate	Votes	%
Lakas–Kampi	Josephine Socorro Jumamoy	78,855	25.00
Nacionalista	Gerardo Garcia	71,035	22.52
Lakas–Kampi	Romulo Cepedoza	47,378	15.02
Nacionalista	Feliberto Camacho	34,603	10.97
Lakas–Kampi	Mutya Kismet Tirol-Macuño	30,479	9.66
Liberal	Wenceslao Garcia	23,809	7.55
Liberal	Eliseo Boyles	19,197	6.08
Liberal	Luciano Bentulan Jr.	10,127	3.21
Total votes		194,765	100.00

==== 3rd District ====
- City: none
- Municipality: Alicia, Anda, Batuan, Bilar, Candijay, Carmen, Dimiao, Duero, Garcia Hernandez, Guindulman, Jagna, Lila, Loay, Loboc, Mabini, Pilar, Sevilla, Sierra Bullones, Valencia
- Population (2007): 425,502

Parties are as stated in their certificate of candidacies

Bohol 3rd District Sangguniang Panlalawigan election
Party	Candidate	Votes	%
Nacionalista	Dionisio Balite	112,270	21.80
Nacionalista	Bienvenido Molina	79,045	15.35
Independent	Godofreda Tirol	64,512	12.53
Lakas–Kampi	Brigido Imboy	54,287	10.54
Liberal	Florencia Garcia	54,107	10.53
Lakas–Kampi	Josil Trabajo	45,507	8.84
Lakas–Kampi	Aster Apalisok-Piollo	42,039	8.16
Lakas–Kampi	Senen Lloren	39,999	7.77
Nacionalista	Felix Casingcasing Sr.	33,669	6.54
Independent	Eduardo Enerio	6,898	1.34
Total votes		213,845	100.00

== City and municipal elections ==
All municipalities of Bohol and Tagbilaran City elected mayors and vice-mayors in this election. The candidates for mayor and vice mayor with the highest number of votes won seats, and were voted separately. Therefore, they may belong to different parties when elected. Below is the list of mayoralty candidates of each city and municipalities for each district. Out of 47 towns and one city, Tagbilaran City, 22 mayors were reelected to their position and 26 were elected as new mayors. There were 37 male and 11 females elected as city or town executive. On the other hand, 34 were elected as new vice mayors and 14 incumbents were reelected. The new vice mayors included six incumbent mayors who slid down and won.

=== 1st District ===
- City: Tagbilaran City
- Municipality: Alburquerque, Antequera, Baclayon, Balilihan, Calape, Catigbian, Corella, Cortes, Dauis, Loon, Maribojoc, Panglao, Sikatuna, Tubigon

==== Tagbilaran City ====
The total number of voters was 40,690. Defeated vice mayor Jose Antonio Veloso filed a protest at the Commission on Elections in Manila against re-elected Mayor Dan Lim after claiming that there were irregularities in the May 10 polls. Lim won in all 15 barangays of the city including Booy, also the home barangay of Veloso. Nuevas Tirol-Montes was also reelected as vice mayor.

Tagbilaran City mayoralty election
Party	Candidate	Votes	%
NPC	Dan Lim	24,061	60.47
Lakas–Kampi	Jose Antonio Veloso	15,726	39.53
Total votes		39,787	100.00

==== Alburquerque ====
The total number of voter was 5,383. Jet Jose Ugdoracion was also reelected as vice mayor.

Alburquerque mayoralty election
Party	Candidate	Votes	%
Lakas–Kampi	Efren Tungol	2,169	41.50
Nacionalista	Rene Buates	1,689	32.32
Liberal	Cirilo Jalad	1,368	26.18
Total votes		5,226	100.00

==== Antequera ====
The total number of voters was 7,319. Jose Mario Pahang became the newly elected mayor and Liliosa Nunag was also reelected as vice mayor.

Antequera mayoralty election
Party	Candidate	Votes	%
Lakas–Kampi	Jose Mario Pahang	3,656	52.48
Independent	Samuel Rebosura	3,310	47.52
Total votes		6,966	100.00

==== Baclayon ====
The total number of voters was 9,342. Both Alvin Uy and Jodel Theodore Cabahug were reelected as mayor and vice mayor of the town.

Baclayon mayoralty election
Party	Candidate	Votes	%
Nacionalista	Alvin Uy	4,644	50.50
Lakas–Kampi	Benecio Uy	4,540	49.37
Independent	Pelegrino Ibao	12	0.13
Total votes		9,196	100.00

==== Balilihan ====
The total number of voters was 8,516. Dominisio Chatto became the newly elected mayor while Efren Chatto was reelected as vice mayor.

Balilihan mayoralty election
Party	Candidate	Votes	%
Lakas–Kampi	Dominicio Chatto	6,359	100.00
Total votes		6,359	100.00

==== Calape ====
The total number of voters was 16,024. Incumbent mayor Sulpicio Yu Jr. was reelected as town mayor together with his brother Nelson Yu, who also won as vice-mayor over their rivals.

Calape mayoralty election
Party	Candidate	Votes	%
Lakas–Kampi	Sulpicio Yu Jr.	12,496	81.40
Nacionalista	Gerardo Quadrasal Jr.	2,567	18.60
Total votes		15,063	100.00

==== Catigbian ====
The total number of voters was 11,108. Both Roberto Salinas and Reynald Lacea were reelected as mayor and vice mayor of the town.

Catigbian mayoralty election
Party	Candidate	Votes	%
Lakas–Kampi	Roberto Salinas	7,502	100.00
Total votes		7,502	100.00

==== Corella ====
Total number of voters was 3,938. Both Epifanio Bolando and Vito Rapal were reelected as mayor and vice mayor of the town.

Corella mayoralty election
Party	Candidate	Votes	%
Lakas–Kampi	Epifanio Bolando	2,050	53.33
Nacionalista	Jose Nicanor Tocmo	1,794	46.67
Total votes		3,844	100.00

==== Cortes ====
Total number of voters was 8,437. Both Apolinaria Balistoy and Danilo Montero were reelected as mayor and vice mayor of the town.

Cortes mayoralty election
Party	Candidate	Votes	%
Lakas–Kampi	Apolinaria Balistoy	5,098	62.12
Independent	Rodrigo Dennis Uy	3,109	37.88
Total votes		8,207	100.00

==== Dauis ====
The total number of voters was 18,024. Jaime Jimenez became the newly elected mayor while Allan Coloma was reelected as vice mayor.

Dauis mayoralty election
Party	Candidate	Votes	%
PMP	Jaime Jimenez	8,828	50.43
Nacionalista	Victorio Migrino	8,678	49.57
Total votes		17,506	100.00

==== Loon ====
The total number of voters was 20,117. Lloyd Peter Lopez became the newly elected mayor while Edwin Ladeza was reelected as vice mayor.

Loon mayoralty election
Party	Candidate	Votes	%
PDP–Laban	Lloyd Peter Lopez	16,118	80.12
Nacionalista	Wilfredo Caresosa	3,999	19.88
Total votes		20,117	100.00

==== Maribojoc ====
The total number of voters was 10,222. Both Leoncio Evasco Jr. and Fructuoso Redulla Jr. were reelected as mayor and vice mayor of the town.

Maribojoc mayoralty election
Party	Candidate	Votes	%
NPC	Leoncio Evasco Jr.	6,143	60.91
Lakas–Kampi	Jose Veloso	3,942	39.09
Total votes		10,085	100.00

==== Panglao ====
The total number of voters was 15,440. Both Benedicto Alcala and Evangeline Lazaro were reelected as mayor and vice mayor of the town.

Panglao mayoralty election
Party	Candidate	Votes	%
Lakas–Kampi	Benedicto Alcala	5,512	36.74
Independent	Leonila Montero	5,050	33.66
LDP	Pedro Fuertes	4,228	20.18
Liberal	Arturo Arboladura	211	1.41
Total votes		15,001	100.00

==== Sikatuna ====
The total number of voters was 3,998. Jose Ellorimo became the newly elected mayor while Julian Manigo was reelected as vice mayor.

Sikatuna mayoralty election
Party	Candidate	Votes	%
Nacionalista	Jose Ellorimo	2,190	56.01
Lakas–Kampi	Ireneo Calimpusan	1,760	43.99
Total votes		3,924	100.00

==== Tubigon ====
The total number of voters was 21,861. Incumbent mayor Luna Piezas lost to William Jao by 16.9% of votes. However, Piezas said he will file a formal complaint before the local courts for alleged election fraud last May 10 polls. Piezas claimed he was a victim of a "pre-programmed compact flash card" which manipulated the results of the local elections in his hometown. William Jao became the newly elected mayor while Virgilio Fortich was reelected was vice mayor.

Tubigon mayoralty election
Party	Candidate	Votes	%
Nacionalista	William Jao	12,483	56.67
Lakas–Kampi	Luna Piezas	8,792	41.33
Total votes		21,275	100.00

=== 2nd District ===
- City: none
- Municipality: Bien Unido, Buenavista, Clarin, Dagohoy, Danao, Getafe, Inabanga, Pres. Carlos P. Garcia, Sagbayan, San Isidro, San Miguel, Talibon, Trinidad, Ubay

==== Bien Unido ====
The total number of voters was 11,557. Both Niño Rey Boniel and Justiniane Petronilo were reelected as mayor and vice mayor of the town.

Bien Unido mayoralty election
Party	Candidate	Votes	%
Nacionalista	Niño Rey Boniel	5,983	53.82
Lakas–Kampi	Rogelio Villarias	5,086	47.75
Independent	Virginia Baruffol	47	0.42
Total votes		11,116	100.00

==== Buenavista ====
The total number of voters was 13,747. Both Robert Celocia and Ronald Lowell Tirol were elected as the new mayor and vice mayor of the town.

Buenavista mayoralty election
Party	Candidate	Votes	%
Liberal	Robert Celosia	6,788	51.86
Lakas–Kampi	Elsa Tirol	6,255	47.79
Total votes		13,090	100.00

==== Clarin ====
The total number of voters was 10,546. Allen Ray Piezas became the newly elected mayor while Hermogenes Diezon was reelected as vice mayor.

Clarin mayoralty election
Party	Candidate	Votes	%
Lakas–Kampi	Allen Ray Piezas	6,644	65.93
Independent	Maria Juditha Simbajon	1,825	18.11
Nacionalista	Trifon Sanchez	1,609	15.97
Total votes		10,078	100.00

==== Dagohoy ====
The total number of voters was 8,631. Both Herminio Relampagos and Jemilo Puertos were reelected as mayor and vice mayor of the town.

Dagohoy mayoralty election
Party	Candidate	Votes	%
Independent	Herminio Relampagos	6,235	75.27
Independent	Anania David	2,049	24.73
Total votes		8,284	100.00

==== Danao ====
The total number of voters was 8,289. Luis Thomas Gonzaga was reelected as mayor while Jose Cepedoza became the newly elected vice mayor.

Danao mayoralty election
Party	Candidate	Votes	%
Lakas–Kampi	Louis Thomas Gonzaga	6,752	100.00
Total votes		6,752	100.00

==== Getafe ====
The total number of voters was 14,981. Cary Camacho became the newly elected mayor while Simon Torreon was reelected as vice mayor.

Getafe mayoralty election
Party	Candidate	Votes	%
LDP	Cary Camacho	5,352	37.16
Lakas–Kampi	Manuel Monillas	4,751	32.39
Nacionalista	Maria Fe Camacho-Lejos	4,299	29.85
Total votes		14,402	20.00

==== Inabanga ====
The total number of voters was 20,553. Jose Jono Jumamoy was reelected as mayor while Wenceslao Lao became the newly elected vice mayor.

Inabanga mayoralty election
Party	Candidate	Votes	%
Lakas–Kampi	Jose Jono Jumamoy	16,388	85.62
Liberal	Geronimo Mejias	2,753	14.38
Total votes		19,141	100.00

==== Pres. Carlos P. Garcia ====
The total number of voters was 10,873. Tesalonica Boyboy was reelected as mayor while Nestor Abad became the newly elected vice mayor.

Pres. Carlos P. Garcia mayoralty election
Party	Candidate	Votes	%
Lakas–Kampi	Tesalonica Boyboy	7,796	74.93
Independent	Casiano Oldigado	1,833	17.62
Liberal	Leoniso Rosales	776	7.46
Total votes		10,405	100.00

==== Sagbayan ====
The total number of voters was 11,390. Ricardo Suarez became the newly elected mayor while Charito Lao was reelected as vice mayor.

Sagbayan mayoralty election
Party	Candidate	Votes	%
Liberal	Ricardo Suarez	6,686	60.64
Lakas–Kampi	Pastor Gudia	4,304	39.04
Independent	Castelar Borja	36	0.33
Total votes		11,026	100.00

==== San Isidro ====
The total number of voters was 4,963. Jacinto Naraga became the newly elected mayor while Eudoxio Asoy was reelected as vice mayor.

San Isidro mayoralty election
Party	Candidate	Votes	%
Nacionalista	Jacinto Naraga	2,561	52.27
Lakas–Kampi	Apolinar Gumanid	2,293	47.24
Total votes		4,854	100.00

==== San Miguel ====
The total number of voters was 10,811. Both Claudio Bonior and Jonathan Reyes were reelected as mayor and vice mayor of the town.

San Miguel mayoralty election
Party	Candidate	Votes	%
Lakas–Kampi	Claudio Bonior	5,629	53.27
PMP	Nunila Pinat	4,938	46.73
Total votes		10,567	100.00

==== Talibon ====
The total number of voters was 24,890. Both Restituto Auxtero and Marcos Aurestila were reelected as mayor and vice mayor of the town.

Talibon mayoralty election
Party	Candidate	Votes	%
Lakas–Kampi	Restituto Auxtero	12,452	51.70
Independent	Juanario Item	11,631	48.30
Total votes		24,083	100.00

==== Trinidad ====
The total number of voters was 14,123. Both Roberto Cajes and Francisco Gonzales were elected as the new mayor and vice mayor of the town.

Trinidad mayoralty election
Party	Candidate	Votes	%
Lakas–Kampi	Roberto Cajes	8,045	59.15
Liberal	Florencio Flores Jr.	5,556	40.85
Total votes		13,601	100.00

==== Ubay ====
The total number of voters was 29,411. Eutiquio Bernales Sr. and Constantino Reyes were reelected as mayor and vice mayor respectively.

Ubay mayoralty election
Party	Candidate	Votes	%
Lakas–Kampi	Eutiquio Bernales Sr.	11,465	41.41
Nacionalista	Galicano Atup	8,267	29.96
Independent	Amalia Tirol	7,954	28.73
Total votes		27,686	100.00

=== 3rd District ===
- City: none
- Municipality: Alicia, Anda, Batuan, Bilar, Candijay, Carmen, Dimiao, Duero, Garcia Hernandez, Guindulman, Jagna, Lila, Loay, Loboc, Mabini, Pilar, Sevilla, Sierra Bullones, Valencia

==== Alicia ====
The total number of voters was 10,982. Both Marnilou Ayuban and Basilio Balahay were elected as the new mayor and vice mayor of the town.

Alicia mayoralty election
Party	Candidate	Votes	%
Nacionalista	Marnilou Ayuban	5,867	55.70
Lakas–Kampi	Pedro Miasco	4,667	44.30
Total votes		10,534	100.00

==== Anda ====
The total number of voters was 8,634. Angelina Simacio became the newly elected mayor while Paulino Amper was reelected as vice mayor.

Anda mayoralty election
Party	Candidate	Votes	%
Nacionalista	Angelina Simacio	4,086	47.43
Lakas–Kampi	Reinerio Makinano	4,084	47.42
Independent	Domenciano Deligero	473	5.49
Total votes		8,615	100.00

==== Batuan ====
The total number of voters was 6,663. Gregoria Pepito became the newly elected mayor while Antonino Jumawid was reelected as vice mayor.

Batuan mayoralty election
Party	Candidate	Votes	%
Lakas–Kampi	Gregoria Pepito	3,019	46.50
LDP	Rolando Emmanuel Leyson	2,832	43.62
Nacionalista	Necitas Avito Dumagan	403	6.21
Independent	Gaudencio Gamayot	238	3.67
Total votes		6,492	100.00

==== Bilar ====
The total number of voters was 9,178. Norman Palacio became the newly elected mayor while Arnold Calamba was reelected as vice mayor.

Bilar mayoralty election
Party	Candidate	Votes	%
Nacionalista	Norman Palacio	4,616	51.29
Lakas–Kampi	Esther Corazon Galbreath	4,384	48.71
Total votes		9,000	100.00

==== Candijay ====
The total number of voters was 15,064. Incumbent mayor Sergio Amora Jr. was reelected as town mayor under Lakas-Kampi-CMD. While, his brother Rey Amora, an Independent also won as vice mayor.

Candijay mayoralty election
Party	Candidate	Votes	%
Lakas–Kampi	Sergio Amora Jr.	8,688	58.94
NPC	Trygve Olaivar	6,053	41.06
Total votes		14,741	100.00

==== Carmen ====
The total number of voters was 22,659. Conchita Toribio-delos Reyes became the newly elected mayor while Pedro Budiongan was reelected as vice mayor.

Carmen mayoralty election
Party	Candidate	Votes	%
Lakas–Kampi	Conchita Toribio-delos Reyes	13,480	61.42
Nacionalista	Manuel Molina	8,467	38.58
Total votes		21,947	100.00

==== Dimiao ====
The total number of voters was 8,288. Sylvia Adame was reelected as mayor while Danilo Guivencan became the newly elected vice mayor.

Dimiao mayoralty election
Party	Candidate	Votes	%
Lakas–Kampi	Sylvia Adame	4,210	52.16
Independent	Jaime Balbon	3,862	47.84
Total votes		8,072	100.00

==== Duero ====
The total number of voters was 9,594. Both Cornelius Ocay and Patton Olano were elected as the new mayor and vice mayor of the town.

Duero mayoralty election
Party	Candidate	Votes	%
LDP	Cornelius Ocay	5,675	61.26
Lakas–Kampi	Angelito Betonio	3,589	38.74
Total votes		9,264	100.00

==== Garcia-Hernandez ====
The total number of voters was 11,342. Miguelito Galendez became the newly elected mayor while Pio Salmasan was reelected as vice mayor.

Garcia Hernandez mayoralty election
Party	Candidate	Votes	%
Nacionalista	Miguelito Galendez	6,024	54.64
Lakas–Kampi	Tita Gallentes	5,001	45.36
Total votes		11,025	100.00

==== Guindulman ====
The total number of voters was 15,452. Both Maria Fe Piezas and Maria Edineth Hohmann were reelected as mayor and vice mayor of the town.

Guindulman mayoralty election
Party	Candidate	Votes	%
Lakas–Kampi	Maria Fe Piezas	10,604	71.08
Liberal	Oriculo Granada	4,318	28.94
Total votes		14,922	100.00

==== Jagna ====
The total number of voters was 16,708. Fortunato Abrenilla Jr. became the newly elected mayor while Exuperio Lloren was reelected as vice mayor.

Jagna mayoralty election
Party	Candidate	Votes	%
Lakas–Kampi	Fortunato Abrenilla Jr.	11,947	74.09
Liberal	Joseph Rañola	4,179	25.91
Total votes		16,126	100.00

==== Lila ====
The total number of voters was 5,829. Both Regina Salazar and Frederick Raut were elected as the new mayor and vice mayor of the town.

Lila mayoralty election
Party	Candidate	Votes	%
Lakas–Kampi	Regina Salazar	4,636	82.24
Independent	Alex Paigan	1,001	17.76
Total votes		5,637	100.00

==== Loay ====
The total number of voters was 9,710. Both Rosemarie Lim-Imboy and Paulino Tejano were reelected as mayor and vice mayor of the town.

Loay mayoralty election
Party	Candidate	Votes	%
Lakas–Kampi	Rosemarie Lim-Imboy	5,764	60.15
Liberal	Magileo Wilfredo Flores	3,818	39.85
Total votes		9,582	100.00

==== Loboc ====
The total number of voters was 8,807. Leon Calipusan was reelected as mayor while Luisito Digal became the newly elected vice mayor.

Loboc mayoralty election
Party	Candidate	Votes	%
Lakas–Kampi	Leon Calipusan	6,570	78.03
Liberal	Petronilo Sarigumba	1,850	21.97
Total votes		8,420	100.00

==== Mabini ====
The total number of voters was 12,256. Esther Tabigue became the newly elected mayor while Stephen Rances was reelected as vice mayor.

Mabini mayoralty election
Party	Candidate	Votes	%
Lakas–Kampi	Esther Tabigue	4,959	41.44
Nacionalista	Sancho Bernales	2,821	23.57
Independent	Jesha Cuyacot	2,218	18.53
Independent	Edna Bagabaldo	1,183	9.89
Independent	Venancio Jayoma	786	6.57
Total votes		11,967	100.00

==== Pilar ====
The total number of voters was 12,454. Both Wilson Pajo and Wilfredo Bernante Jr. were reelected as mayor and vice mayor of the town.

Pilar mayoralty election
Party	Candidate	Votes	%
Lakas–Kampi	Wilson Pajo	6,155	50.67
Nacionalista	Necitas Cubrado	5,992	49.33
Total votes		12,147	100.00

==== Sevilla ====
The total number of voters was 5,770. Ernesita Digal became the newly elected mayor while Simplicio Maestrado Jr. was reelected as vice mayor.

Sevilla mayoralty election
Party	Candidate	Votes	%
Lakas–Kampi	Ernesita Digal	2,990	52.89
Nacionalista	Carlito Fernandez	2,663	47.11
Total votes		5,653	100.00

==== Sierra Bullones ====
The total number of voters was 11,929. Alfredo Gamalo became the newly elected mayor while Sinforiano Cutin was reelected as vice mayor.

Sierra Bullones mayoralty election
Party	Candidate	Votes	%
Lakas–Kampi	Alfredo Gamalo	6,223	53.55
LDP	Rainfredo Buslon	5,399	46.45
Total votes		11,622	100.00

==== Valencia ====
The total number of voters was 12,377. Henrietta Gan was reelected as mayor while Jorge Buslon became the newly elected vice mayor.

Valencia mayoralty election
Party	Candidate	Votes	%
Lakas–Kampi	Henrietta Gan	6,490	54.67
Nacionalista	Leo Olegario	5,354	45.10
Independent	Jose Daleon Jr.	27	0.23
Total votes		11,871	100.00

== See also ==
- Elections in Bohol
- 2010 Philippine barangay and Sangguniang Kabataan elections
- List of Barangays of Bohol, Philippines
