= List of members of the House of Representatives of the Philippines (J) =

This is a complete list of past and present members of the House of Representatives of the Philippines whose last names begin with the letter J.

This list also includes members of the Philippine Assembly (1907–1916), the Commonwealth National Assembly (1935–1941), the Second Republic National Assembly (1943–1944) and the Batasang Pambansa (1978–1986).

== Ja ==
- Nur Jaafar, member for Tawi-Tawi (1992–2001, 2006–2013)
- Soraya Jaafar, member for Tawi-Tawi (2010–2013)
- Ramon Jabar, sectoral member (1987–1998)
- Alfredo Jacinto, member for Capiz (1943–1944)
- Jaime Jacob, member for Camarines Sur's 2nd district (1998–2001)
- Adam Jala, member for Bohol's 3rd district (2007–2010)
- Eladio Jala, member for Bohol's 3rd district (1998–2007)
- Nicolas Jalandoni, member for Iloilo's 2nd district (1907–1909)
- Bullet Jalosjos, member for Zamboanga del Norte's 1st district (2010–2019)
- Cecilia Jalosjos-Carreon, member for Zamboanga del Norte's 1st district (2002–2010)
- Cesar Jalosjos, member for Zamboanga del Norte's 3rd district (2004–2013)
- Jon-jon Jalosjos, member for Zamboanga Sibugay's 2nd district (2010–2013), and Zamboanga del Norte's 1st district (2019–2022)
- Romeo Jalosjos Sr., member for Zamboanga del Norte (1984–1986), and Zamboanga del Norte's 1st district (1995–2002)
- Constantino Jaraula, member for Cagayan de Oro (1998–2007)
- Exequiel Javier, member for Antique (1987–1998, 2001–2010)
- Irineo Javier, member for Ilocos Norte's 1st district (1907–1912)
- Lolita Javier, member for Leyte's 2nd district (2019–present)
- Pablo Everardo Javier, member for Antique (2010–2019)
- Rufino Javier, member for Pasig (1987–1998)
- Robert Jaworski Jr., member for Pasig (2004–2007)
- Antonio Jayme, member for Negros Occidental's 1st district (1907–1909)

== Ji ==
- Yusop Jikiri, member for Sulu's 1st district (2007–2010)
- Cesar Jimenez Jr., member for Zamboanga City's 1st district (2019–2022)
- Federico Jimenez, member for Sorsogon's 2nd district (1922–1925)
- Mark Jimenez, member for Manila's 6th district (2001–2003)
- Pedro Jimenez, member for Antique (1907–1909)
- Pedro Martinez Jimeno, member for Albay's 2nd district (1919–1925)

== Jo ==
- Nereo Joaquin, member for Laguna's 1st district (1987–1992, 1995–1998)
- Uliran Joaquin, member for Laguna's 1st district (1998–2007)
- Felipe Jose, member for Mountain Province's 2nd district (1935–1938)
- Bernardo Josol, member for Bohol's 1st district (1934–1935)
- Eduardo Nonato Joson, member for Nueva Ecija (1984–1986), and Nueva Ecija's 1st district (1987–1992, 2007–2010)
- Josefina Joson, member for Nueva Ecija's 1st district (1998–2007, 2010–2013)
- Luciano Joson, member for Oriental Mindoro (1961–1969)
- Florentino Joya, member for Cavite (1912–1916)

== Ju ==
- Celestino Juan, member for Nueva Ecija's 2nd district (1953–1957)
- Estelita Juco, sectoral member (1987–1989)
- Alfredo Juinio, member from the Cabinet (1978–1984)
