= 2016 Tagbilaran local elections =

Local Filipino election

2016 Tagbilaran mayoral election
- May 9, 2016
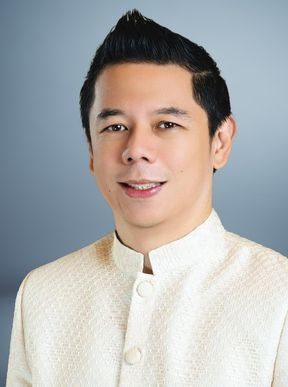
Nominee	John Geesnell Yap	Arlene Karaan	Edgardo Kapirig
Party	Liberal	PMP	Independent
Running mate	Jose Antonio Veloso
Popular vote	39,390	7,481	468
Percentage	83.21	15.80	0.99
Mayor before election
John Geesnell Yap II
Liberal
Elected mayor
John Geesnell Yap II
Liberal

Local elections held in Tagbilaran, Bohol on May 9, 2016 within the Philippine general election. The voters selected leaders for the elective local posts in the city: the mayor, vice mayor, and the ten councilors.

== Background ==
Incumbent John Geesnell Yap II of the Liberal Party is running for a second term. His running mate is incumbent vice mayor Jose Antonio Veloso. The alliance between the Yap and Veloso camps, known as the second iteration of "Pundok Panaghiusa", was sealed only about two weeks before the filing of certificates of candidacy in October 2015.

Yap's main opponent is incumbent Poblacion I barangay chairperson Arlene Karaan, who is running under the Partido ng Masang Pilipino. Karaan, who ran for board member for Bohol's first district in the 2013 elections but lost, is strongly associated with the camp of former city mayor Dan Neri Lim, and she has a slate of five councilors but without a vice mayor. Speculation has it that she will be substituted by Lim before the December 20, 2015 substitution deadline for all candidates for the forthcoming election.

== Election results ==
=== Mayor ===
Tagbilaran Mayoral Election
Party	Candidate	Votes	%
Liberal	John Geesnell Yap II	39,390	83.21%
PMP	Arlene Karaan	7,481	15.80%
Independent	Edgardo Kapirig	468	0.99%
Total votes		47,339	100.00%
Liberal hold			

=== Vice Mayor ===
Tagbilaran Vice Mayoral Election
Party	Candidate	Votes	%
Liberal	Jose Antonio Veloso	37,164	92.13%
Independent	Alfred Hontanosas	3,173	7.87%
Total votes		40,337	100.00%
Liberal hold			

=== Councilors ===
The city's voters elected ten candidates to the City Council at large. The ten candidates with the highest number of votes wins the seats per district.

2016 Tagbilaran Council Elections
Party	Candidate	Votes	%
Liberal	Adam Relson Jala	34,231	9.62%
Liberal	Joseph Bompat	30,136	8.47%
Liberal	Philipp Besas	29,373	8.26%
Liberal	Alberta Co-Torralba	27,834	7.82%
Liberal	Dulce Amelia Glovasa	27,184	7.64%
Liberal	Agustinus Gonzaga	26,822	7.54%
Liberal	Jonas Cacho	26,218	7.37%
Liberal	Eliezer Borja	24,980	7.02%
Independent	Vicente Polinar	22,554	6.34%
Liberal	Greggy Gatal	20,466	5.75%
PMP	Lucille Lagunay	19,396	5.45%
Liberal	Jeremias Pabe	17,807	5.00%
PMP	Eutorgio Telmo Jr.	11,439	3.21%
PMP	Mary Liene Shaene Karaan	10,335	2.90%
PMP	Leda Saco	9,763	2.74%
PMP	Paterna Ruiz	6,829	1.92%
Independent	Dionesio Torralba III	6,218	1.75%
Independent	Jewel Siason	4,229	1.19%
Total votes		355,814	100.00%

==== Pundok Panaghiusa (Team BaTo) ====
Liberal Party/Pundok Panaghiusa - Tagbilaran City
Name	Party
Philipp Besas	Liberal
Joseph Bompat	Liberal
Eliezer Borja	Liberal
Jonas Cacho	Liberal
Greggy Gatal	Liberal
Dulce Glovasa (Note: Dulce Glovasa is running for her first full term. She was appointed to serve the remainder of the term of her husband, elected councilor Oscar Glovasa, who died.)	Liberal
Agustinus Gonzaga (Note: Agustinus Gonzaga is running for another nonconsecutive term. A former councilor and the second-placing mayoral candidate in the 2013 local polls, he was appointed to serve the remainder of the term of elected councilor Alexander Lim, who died.)	Liberal
Adam Relson Jala	Liberal
Jeremias Pabe	Liberal
Alberta Co-Torralba	Liberal

==== Pwersa ng Masang Pilipino ====
Pwersa ng Masang Pilipino - Tagbilaran City
Name	Party
Mary Liene Shaene Karaan	PMP
Lucille Lagunay	PMP
Paterna Ruiz	PMP
Leda Saco	PMP
Eutorgio Telmo Jr.	PMP

== Results ==
The candidates for mayor, vice mayor, and district representative with the highest number of votes won the seat; they are voted separately, therefore, they may be of different parties when elected.
