= 2013 Bohol local elections =

Philippine election

2013 Bohol gubernatorial election
- May 13, 2013
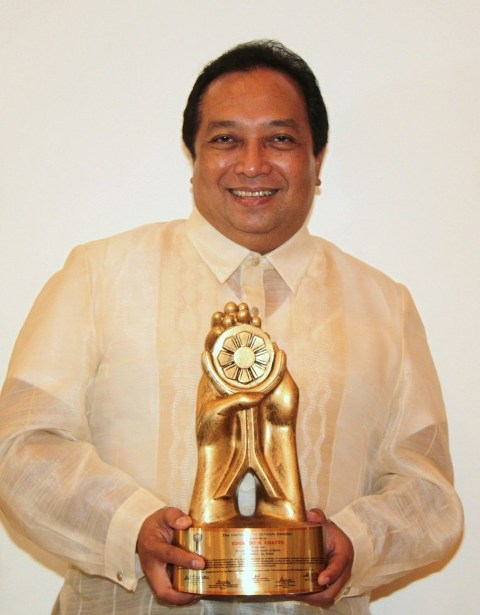
Nominee	Edgardo Chatto	Conchita Torribio-delos Reyes	Roberto "Amay Bisaya" Reyes
Party	Liberal	UNA	KBL
Running mate	Concepcion Lim	Sharleen Corral-Lim
Popular vote	380,964	164,904	2,667
Percentage	67.65	30.47	0.56
Governor before election
Edgardo Chatto
Liberal
Elected Governor
Edgardo Chatto
Liberal

Local elections were held on May 13, 2013 in the province of Bohol as part of the 2013 Philippine General election. Registered voters elected local positions, which were 386 city and municipal councilors, 48 city and town mayors and vice-mayors, 10 provincial board or Sangguniang Panlalawigan members, one governor and vice-governor, and one representative for each of the three districts of Bohol.

The registration ended in October 2012, with registered 775,785 voters, a 45,871 or 6.28% increase from the 729,914 registered voters in 2010. With the use of PCOS machines, the former 4,718 precincts were compressed into 2,473 clustered precincts to accommodate voters in the entire province.

At the end of the filing of certificates of candidacy issued by Comelec on October 5, 2012, a total of 1,132 hopefuls had filed certificates of candidacy for 497 elective positions. Based on the official list of provincial Commission on Elections, 881 aspirants ran for councilors, 108 for mayors, 107 for vice mayors, 23 for provincial board members, 4 for governor, 3 for vice governor, and six for congress in three districts.

== Provincial Election Results ==
The governor and vice governor with the highest number of votes won the seat. However, they were voted separately, so they could be from different parties when elected.

=== Governor ===
Parties below were as stated in certificates of candidacies. The total number of voters was 559,983 (72.18% of total registered voters).

Bohol gubernatorial election
Party	Candidate	Votes	%
Liberal	Edgardo Chatto	320,263	67.65
UNA	Conchita Torribio-delos Reyes	144,247	30.47
Independent	Wenceslao Garcia	6,218	1.31
KBL	Roberto 'Amay Bisaya' Reyes	2,667	0.56
Total votes		473,395	100.00

=== Vice-Governor ===
Parties were stated in certificate of candidacies. The total number of voters was 559,983 (72.18% of total registered voters).

Bohol Vice-Gubernatorial election
Party	Candidate	Votes	%
Liberal	Concepcion Lim	258,784	66.97
NPC	Sharleen Corral-Lim	97,684	25.28
Independent	Joseph Sevilla	29,958	7.75
Total votes		386,426	100.00

=== Sangguniang Panlalawigan ===
Both the 1st and 2nd Districts of Bohol elected three Sangguniang Panlalawigan or provincial board members. The 3rd District, with highest population, elected four board members. The candidates with the highest number of votes won the seats allocated for each district, with the number of winning candidates per district equal to the number of seats that district sent to the provincial legislature.

==== 1st District ====
Parties were stated in certificate of candidacies. The total number of voters was 192,410.

Bohol 1st District Sangguniang Panlalawigan election
Party	Candidate	Votes	%
Liberal	Cesar Tomas Lopez	84,919	23.23
Liberal	Venzencio Arcamo	82,109	22.46
Liberal	Abeleon Damalerio	81,919	22.41
NPC	Handel Lagunay	53,477	14.63
NPC	Arlene Karaan	32,369	8.86
NPC	Ronson Tumaliwan	20,233	5.54
Independent	Cirilo Esperanza Jr.	10,499	2.87
Total votes		365,525	100.00

==== 2nd District ====
Parties were stated in certificate of candidacies. The total number of voters was 196,879.

Bohol 2nd District Sangguniang Panlalawigan election
Party	Candidate	Votes	%
Liberal	Jovanna Cheng Jumamoy	79,156	23.32
NPC	Gerardo Garcia	72,058	21.23
NPC	Tomas Abapo Jr.	55,593	16.38
NPC	Ma. Fe Camacho-Lejos	52,310	15.41
Liberal	Romulo Cepedoza	46,359	13.66
Liberal	Bernardo Avenido Jr.	29,736	8.76
Independent	Alfredo Evalaroza	4,186	1.23
Total votes		339,398	100.00

==== 3rd District ====
Parties were as stated in certificate of candidacies. The total number of voters was 170,694.

Bohol 3rd District Sangguniang Panlalawigan election
Party	Candidate	Votes	%
UNA	Dionisio Balite	86,191	23.97
Liberal	Elpidio Jala	74,349	20.68
Liberal	Godofreda Tirol	67,662	18.82
Liberal	Brigido Imboy	57,782	16.07
Liberal	Josil Trabajo	45,253	12.59
UNA	Floyd Errol Ordeñez	12,639	3.52
Independent	Reynaldo Polinar	10,038	2.79
Independent	Santos Abella	5,617	1.56
Total votes		359,531	100.00

== Congressional election results ==
Each of Bohol's three legislative districts elected representative to the House of Representatives. The candidate with the highest number of votes won the seat.

=== 1st District, Congressman ===
- City: Tagbilaran City
- Municipality: Alburquerque, Antequera, Baclayon, Balilihan, Calape, Catigbian, Corella, Cortes, Dauis, Loon, Maribojoc, Panglao, Sikatuna, Tubigon
- Population (2010): 415,420

Rene Relampagos was the incumbent. The mayor of Tagbilaran City, Dan Neri Lim, challenged him for the congressional seat. Parties were as stated in certificate of candidacies. The total number of voters was 192,410.

Philippine House of Representatives election at Bohol's 1st district
Party	Candidate	Votes	%
Liberal	Rene Relampagos	125,442	73.16
NPC	Dan Neri Lim	46,014	26.84
Total votes		171,456	100.00

=== 2nd District, Congressman ===
- City: none
- Municipality: Bien Unido, Buenavista, Clarin, Dagohoy, Danao, Getafe, Inabanga, Pres. Carlos P. Garcia, Sagbayan, San Isidro, San Miguel, Talibon, Trinidad, Ubay
- Population (2010): 415,878

Incumbent Erico B. Aumentado died while in office on December 25, 2012. The Nationalist People's Coalition replaced him with a substitute against his perennial rival, former three-term congressman and by then, incumbent Trinidad mayor Roberto Cajes. Forty days after his father's death, Aumentado's youngest son and acting congressman Erico Aristotle filed his certificate of candidacy. Parties below were as stated in certificate of candidacies. The total number of voters was 196,879.

Philippine House of Representatives election at Bohol's 2nd district
Party	Candidate	Votes	%
NPC	Erico Aristotle Aumentado	99,691	58.70
Liberal	Roberto Cajes	70,128	41.30
Total votes		169,819	100.00

=== 3rd District, Congressman ===
- City: none
- Municipality: Alicia, Anda, Batuan, Bilar, Candijay, Carmen, Dimiao, Duero, Garcia Hernandez, Guindulman, Jagna, Lila, Loay, Loboc, Mabini, Pilar, Sevilla, Sierra Bullones, Valencia
- Population (2010): 423,830

Arthur Yap of Loboc was the incumbent. Last term Loboc Mayor Leon Calipusan filed his CONA under the administration ticket. However, on January 9, 2013, Calipusan filed an affidavit of withdrawal, indicating family and health reasons. It made Arthur Yap unopposed for two consecutive elections. Parties were stated in certificate of candidacies. The total number of voters was 170,694.

Philippine House of Representatives election at Bohol's 3rd district
Party	Candidate	Votes	%
NPC	Arthur Yap	127,909	100.00
Total votes		127,909	100.00

== City and Municipal Elections Results ==
All municipalities of Bohol and Tagbilaran City elected mayors, vice-mayors, and councilors. The mayor and vice mayor with the highest number of votes won the seat. They were voted separately, and therefore could be from different parties when elected. Below is the list of mayoralty and vice-mayoralty candidates of each city and municipalities per district.

=== First District ===
==== Tagbilaran City ====
Parties were stated on certificates of candidacy. The total number voters was 40,548, equivalent to 78.79% of 51,462 registered voters.

Tagbilaran City Mayoralty Election
Party	Candidate	Votes	%
NUP	John Geesnell Yap	14,975	38.63
Liberal	Agustinus Gonzaga	13,694	35.33
NPC	Abraham Lim	9,885	25.50
Independent	Gaudencio Bantugan	210	0.54
Total votes		40,548	100.00

Tagbilaran City Vice-Mayoralty Election
Party	Candidate	Votes	%
Liberal	Jose Antonio Veloso	13,521	35.56
NUP	Anne Mariquit Oppus	13,287	34.95
NPC	Nuevas Montes-Tirol	10,811	28.44
Independent	Cresencio Alturas	277	0.101
Independent	Alfred Hontanosas	123	0.32
Total votes		38,019	0.32

==== Alburquerque ====
Parties were stated on certificates of candidacy.

Alburquerque Mayoralty Election
Party	Candidate	Votes	%
Liberal	Efren Tungol	1,352	52.08
UNA	Jet Jose Ugdoracion	1,244	47.92
Total votes		2,596	100.00

Alburquerque Vice-Mayoralty Election
Party	Candidate	Votes	%
UNA	Cayetano Doria Jr.	1,565	61.32
Liberal	Rene Buates	977	38.28
Independent	Dalmacio Mahinay	8	0.31
Independent	Uldarico Mahinay	2	0.08
Total votes		2,552	100.00

==== Antequera ====
Municipal Councilor Simeon Leo Jadulco ran unopposed for vice mayor under the Liberal Party.

Antequera Mayoralty Election
Party	Candidate	Votes	%
Liberal	Jose Mario Pahang	2,118	60.67
Independent	Samuel Rebosura	901	25.81
UNA	Asterio Coquilla	472	13.25
Total votes		3,491	100.00

Antequera Vice-Mayoralty Election
Party	Candidate	Votes	%
Liberal	Simon Leo Jadulco	2,709	100.00
Total votes		2,709	100.00

==== Baclayon ====
Baclayon Mayoralty Election
Party	Candidate	Votes	%
Nacionalista	Alvin Uy	5,314	52.90
Liberal	Benecio Uy	4,717	46.96
Independent	Pelegrino Ibao	14	0.14
Total votes		10,303	100.00

Baclayon Vice-Mayoralty Election
Party	Candidate	Votes	%
Nacionalista	Jodel Theodore Cabahug	5,381	56.15
Liberal	Derwin Cuajao	4,203	43.85
Total votes		10,303	100.00

==== Balilihan ====
Balilihan Mayoralty Election
Party	Candidate	Votes	%
Liberal	Dominisio Chatto	6,105	69.20
UNA	Mark Leo Monton	2,717	30.80
Total votes		9,559	100.00

Balilihan Vice-Mayoralty Election
Party	Candidate	Votes	%
Liberal	Pureza Chatto	5,614	62.12
UNA	Salvio Madanguit	3,424	37.88
Total votes		9,559	100.00

==== Calape ====
Brothers Sulpicio Yu and Nelson Yu sought re-election as mayor and vice mayor, respectively, under the Liberal Party.

Calape Mayoralty Election
Party	Candidate	Votes	%
Liberal	Sulpicio Yu Jr.	5,239	61.53
UNA	Julius Caesar Herrera	3,276	38.74
Total votes		8,949	100.00

Calape Vice-Mayoralty Election
Party	Candidate	Votes	%
Liberal	Nelson Yu	5,758	69.16%
UNA	Teodoro Ruizol	2,568	30.84
Total votes		8,949	100.00

==== Catigbian ====
Catigbian Mayoralty Election
Party	Candidate	Votes	%
Liberal	Virgilio Lurot	2,962	66.23
UNA	Aurelio Dinorog Sr.	1,510	33.77
Total votes		4,818	100.00

Catigbian Vice-Mayoralty Election
Party	Candidate	Votes	%
Liberal	Reynaldo Lacea	3,374	80.09
UNA	Rufa Dinorog-Mission	839	19.91
Total votes		4,818	100.00

==== Corella ====
Total number of voters was 4,327, out of 4,898 registered voters, or 88.34%

Corella Mayoralty Election
Party	Candidate	Votes	%
UNA	Jose Nicanor Tocmo	2,461	58.53
Liberal	Vito Rapal	1,525	36.27
Independent	Epifanio Bolando	198	4.71
Independent	Reynaldo Irig	21	0.50
Total votes		4,205	100.00

Corella Vice-Mayoralty Election
Party	Candidate	Votes	%
UNA	Maria Asuncion Daquio	2,191	55.05
Liberal	Godofedo Ado	1,789	44.95
Total votes		3,980	100.00

==== Cortes ====
Cortes Mayoralty Election
Party	Candidate	Votes	%
NPC	Roberto Tabanera	4,188	51.17
Liberal	Danilo Montero	3,996	48.83
Total votes		8,560	100.00

Cortes Vice-Mayoralty Election
Party	Candidate	Votes	%
Liberal	Lynn Iven Lim	4,152	51.81
NPC	Apolinaria Balistoy	3,862	48.19
Total votes		8,560	100.00

==== Dauis ====
Dauis Mayoralty Election
Party	Candidate	Votes	%
Liberal	Marietta "Miriam" Sumaylo	8,634	41.93
NPC	Jaime Jimenez	7,304	35.47
PMP	Victorio Migriño	4,653	22.60
Total votes		21,268	100.00

Dauis Vice-Mayoralty Election
Party	Candidate	Votes	%
Liberal	Luciano Bongalos	10,763	56.64
NPC	Allan Coloma	7,219	37.99
PMP	Pacifico Branzuela	1,020	5.37
Total votes		21,268	100.00

==== Loon ====
Loon Mayoralty Election
Party	Candidate	Votes	%
Liberal	Lloyd Peter Lopez	14,300	63.83
UNA	Ana Lisa Orcullo-Go	8,105	36.17
Total votes		23,314	100.00

Loon Vice-Mayoralty Election
Party	Candidate	Votes	%
Liberal	Elvi Relampagos	12,782	59.62
UNA	Titus Clark Miranda	7,231	33.73
Independent	Wilfredo Caresosa	1,427	6.66
Total votes		23,314	100.00

==== Maribojoc ====
Election Turnouts: (88.33%) 10,771 of 12,194 Registered Voters

Maribojoc Mayoralty Election
Party	Candidate	Votes	%
NPC	Leoncio Evasco Jr.	5,637	55.05
Liberal	Jose Veloso	4,602	44.95
Total votes		10,239	100.00

Maribojoc Vice-Mayoralty Election
Party	Candidate	Votes	%
NPC	Frustuoso Redulla	4,600	46.88
Liberal	Alberto Arangoso	2,958	30.14
Independent	Lourdes Concepcion Endo	2,255	22.98
Total votes		9,813	100.00

==== Panglao ====
Panglao Mayoralty Election
Party	Candidate	Votes	%
PDP–Laban	Leonila Paredes-Montero	8,192	49.17
Liberal	Benedicto Alcala	7,205	43.24
UNA	Evangeline Bon-Lazaro	1,265	7.59
Total votes		17,226	100.00

Panglao Vice-Mayoralty Election
Party	Candidate	Votes	%
UNA	Pedro Fuertes	6,773	43.00
PDP–Laban	Noel Hormachuelos	4,969	31.55
Liberal	Cerino Hormachuelos	2,624	16.66
LDP	Walter Sultan	1,386	8.80
Total votes		17,226	100.00

==== Sikatuna ====
Incumbent Mayor Jose Ellorimo Jr. ran unopposed under the Liberal Party (LP) ticket.

Sikatuna Mayoralty Election
Party	Candidate	Votes	%
Liberal	Jose Ellorimo Jr.	3,314	100.00
Total votes		3,314	100.00

Sikatuna Vice-Mayoralty Election
Party	Candidate	Votes	%
Liberal	Julian Manigo	2,401	63.94
PDP–Laban	Chester Ian Rule	1,354	36.06
Total votes		3,755	100.00

==== Tubigon ====
Tubigon Mayoralty Election
Party	Candidate	Votes	%
NPC	Marlon Amila	10,769	50.54
Liberal	William Jao	10,538	49.46
Total votes		22,284	100.00

Tubigon Vice-Mayoralty Election
Party	Candidate	Votes	%
Liberal	Virgilio Fortich	16,820	87.99
UNA	Joel Somosot	2,295	12.01
Total votes		21,307	100.00

=== Second District ===
==== Bien Unido ====
Bien Unido Mayoralty Election
Party	Candidate	Votes	%
Nacionalista	Niño Rey Boniel	6,095	55.58
Liberal	Francisco Pacquito Avenido	4,872	44.42
Total votes		10,967	100.00

Bien Unido Vice-Mayoralty Election
Party	Candidate	Votes	%
Nacionalista	Rene Borenaga	5,334	50.69
Liberal	Joselyn Villarias	5,188	49.31
Total votes		10,522	100.00

==== Buenavista ====
Buenavista Mayoralty Election
Party	Candidate	Votes	%
NPC	Ronald Lowell Tirol	9,089	71.49
Liberal	Alfonso del Rosario Jr.	3,625	28.51
Total votes		12,714	100.00

Buenavista Vice-Mayoralty Election
Party	Candidate	Votes	%
NPC	Dave Duallo	6,725	58.77
Liberal	Ermelando Torregosa	4,718	41.23
Total votes		11,443	100.00

==== Clarin ====
Election Turnouts: (88.01%) 11,583 of 13,160 Registered Voters

Clarin Mayoralty Election
Party	Candidate	Votes	%
Liberal	Allen Ray Piezas	5,867	52.60
Independent	Eugeniano Ibarra	5,286	47.40
Total votes		11,153	100.00

Clarin Vice-Mayoralty Election
Party	Candidate	Votes	%
Liberal	Velden Aparicio	6,198	63.42
Independent	Lorenzo Carcallas	3,575	36.58
Total votes		9,773	100.00

==== Dagohoy ====
Dagohoy Mayoralty Election
Party	Candidate	Votes	%
UNA	Sofronio Apat	3,103	51.57
Liberal	Rufina Frajele	2,914	48.43
Total votes		6,017	100.00

Dagohoy Vice-Mayoralty Election
Party	Candidate	Votes	%
Liberal	Andres Ampoloquio	3,409	57.94
NPC	Emelio Puertos	2,475	42.06
Total votes		5,884	100.00

==== Danao ====
Danao Mayoralty Election
Party	Candidate	Votes	%
UNA	Natividad Gonzaga	3,235	52.91
Liberal	Jose Cepedoza	2,879	47.09
Total votes		6,114	100.00

Danao Vice-Mayoralty Election
Party	Candidate	Votes	%
UNA	Louis Thomas Gonzaga	3,052	50.62
Liberal	Albert Vitor	2,977	49.38
Total votes		6,029	100.00

==== Getafe ====
Election Turnouts: (86.94%) 16,455 of 18,926 Registered Voters

Getafe Mayoralty Election
Party	Candidate	Votes	%
UNA	Casey Shaun Camacho	8,310	53.67
Liberal	Manuel Monillos	7,173	46.33
Total votes		15,483	100.00

Getafe Vice-Mayoralty Election
Party	Candidate	Votes	%
UNA	Eduardo Torremocha	7,638	52.99
Liberal	Simon Torreon	6,777	47.01
Total votes		14,415	100.00

==== Inabanga ====
Inabanga Mayoralty Election
Party	Candidate	Votes	%
Liberal	Josephine Socorro Jumamoy	9,305	51.64
NPC	Epifanio Muñeses	8,714	48.36
Total votes		18,019	100.00

Inabanga Vice-Mayoralty Election
Party	Candidate	Votes	%
Liberal	Rodrigo Jumamoy	9,066	53.91
NPC	Abelardo Sendrijas	7,751	46.09
Total votes		16,817	100.00

==== Pres. Carlos P. Garcia ====
Election Turnouts: (81.07%) 11,668 of 14,392 registered voters

Pres. Carlos P. Garcia Mayoralty Election
Party	Candidate	Votes	%
Liberal	Tesalonica Boyboy	9,242	92.33
Independent	Alfonso Galo	768	7.67
Total votes		10,010	100.00

Pres. Carlos P. Garcia Vice-Mayoralty Election
Party	Candidate	Votes	%
NPC	Nestor Abad	6,021	59.93
Independent	Arthur Boyonas	4,025	40.07
Total votes		10,046	100.00

==== Sagbayan ====
Sagbayan Mayoralty Election
Party	Candidate	Votes	%
Liberal	Ricardo Suarez	6,743	62.50
Independent	Jimmy Torrefranca	4,046	37.50
Total votes		10,789	100.00

Sagbayan Vice-Mayoralty Election
Party	Candidate	Votes	%
Liberal	Charito Piezas-Lao	5,352	51.51
Independent	Roque Amores	5,038	48.49
Total votes		10,390	100.00

==== San Isidro ====
Election Turnouts: (88.82%) 5,457 of 6,144 Registered Voters

San Isidro Mayoralty Election
Party	Candidate	Votes	%
UNA	Jacinto Naraga	2,483	51.90
Liberal	Quirino Samuya	2,301	48.01
Total votes		4,784	100.00

San Isidro Vice-Mayoralty Election
Party	Candidate	Votes	%
Liberal	Eudoxio Asoy	2,434	51.07
UNA	Requillo Samuya	2,332	48.93
Total votes		4,766	100.00

==== San Miguel ====
San Miguel Mayoralty Election
Party	Candidate	Votes	%
NPC	Claudio Bonior	4,883	44.46
PMP	Nunila Pinat	3,133	28.52
Liberal	Manuel Gara	2,968	27.02
Total votes		10,982	100.00

San Miguel Vice-Mayoralty Election
Party	Candidate	Votes	%
NPC	Jonathan Reyes	5,353	51.63
Liberal	Armando Branzuela	5,014	48.37
Total votes		10,367	100.00

==== Talibon ====
Talibon Mayoralty Election
Party	Candidate	Votes	%
Liberal	Restituto Auxtero	14,046	61.18
NPC	Carlito Evangelista	8,912	38.82
Total votes		22,958	100.00

Talibon Vice-Mayoralty Election
Party	Candidate	Votes	%
Independent	Epifanio Quimson	13,745	60.40
Liberal	Marcos Aurestilla	9,012	39.60
Total votes		22,757	100.00

==== Trinidad ====
Trinidad Mayoralty Election
Party	Candidate	Votes	%
Liberal	Judith del Rosario-Cajes	7,125	61.74
NPC	Consuelo Mapeso-Garcia	4,416	38.26
Total votes		11,541	100.00

Trinidad Vice-Mayoralty Election
Party	Candidate	Votes	%
Liberal	Francisco Gonzales	6,632	59.44
NPC	Florencio Flores	4,526	40.56
Total votes		11,158	100.00

==== Ubay ====
Ubay Mayoralty Election
Party	Candidate	Votes	%
Liberal	Galicano Atup	13,847	48.38
NPC	Constantino Reyes	12,594	44.00
Nacionalista	Danilo Mendez	2,182	7.62
Total votes		28,623	100.00

Ubay Vice-Mayoralty Election
Party	Candidate	Votes	%
Liberal	Nelson Uy	14,792	54.13
NPC	Eutiquio Bernales Sr.	12,533	45.87
Total votes		27,325	100.00

=== Third District ===
==== Alicia ====
Incumbent Mayor Marilou Ayuban and Vice Mayor Basilio Balahay ran unopposed under the Liberal Party (LP) ticket.

Alicia Mayoralty Election
Party	Candidate	Votes	%
Liberal	Marnilou Ayuban	1,970	100.00
Total votes		1,970	100.00

Alicia Vice-Mayoralty Election
Party	Candidate	Votes	%
Liberal	Basilio Balahay Jr.	1,743	100.00
Total votes		1,743	100.00

==== Anda ====
Anda Mayoralty Election
Party	Candidate	Votes	%
Liberal	Metodio Amper	3,830	51.93
UNA	Paulino Amper	3,546	48.07
Total votes		7,376	100.00

Anda Vice-Mayoralty Election
Party	Candidate	Votes	%
UNA	Angeline Simacio	3,666	50.52
Liberal	Reinerio Makinano	3,590	49.48
Total votes		7,256	100.00

==== Batuan ====
Re-electionist and incumbent Vice Mayor Antonino Jumawid ran unopposed under the Liberal Party (LP) ticket.

Batuan Mayoralty Election
Party	Candidate	Votes	%
Liberal	Francisco Pepito	2,777	53.30
Independent	Sixto Dano	2,433	46.70
Total votes		5,210	100.00

Batuan Vice-Mayoralty Election
Party	Candidate	Votes	%
Liberal	Antonino Jumawid	4,144	100.00
Total votes		4,144	100.00

==== Bilar ====
Bilar Mayoralty Election
Party	Candidate	Votes	%
Liberal	Norman Palacio	3,383	58.15
UNA	Esther Corazon Galbreath	2,435	41.85
Total votes		5,818	100.00

Bilar Vice-Mayoralty Election
Party	Candidate	Votes	%
Liberal	Arnold Calamba	3,241	57.90
UNA	Danilo Cal	2,357	42.10
Total votes		5,598	100.00

==== Candijay ====
Candijay Mayoralty Election
Party	Candidate	Votes	%
UNA	Christopher Tutor	8,634	55.92
Liberal	Sergio Amora III	6,324	40.96
LDP	Rey Amora	483	3.13
Total votes		15,441	100.00

Candijay Vice-Mayoralty Election
Party	Candidate	Votes	%
Liberal	Jing Sales	7,366	50.58
LDP	Tata Olandria	7,197	49.42
Total votes		14,563	100.00

==== Carmen ====
Carmen Mayoralty Election
Party	Candidate	Votes	%
UNA	Ricardo Francisco Toribio	11,512	55.75
Liberal	Manuel Molina	9,138	44.25
Total votes		20,650	100.00

Carmen Vice-Mayoralty Election
Party	Candidate	Votes	%
UNA	Pedro Budiongan	11,797	56.68
Liberal	Arlene Palgan	9,017	43.32
Total votes		20,814	100.00

==== Dimiao ====
Dimiao Mayoralty Election
Party	Candidate	Votes	%
Liberal	Danilo Guivencan	2,468	58.39
Independent	Florida Gamayon	1,676	39.65
UNA	Dennis Magtajas	83	1.96
Total votes		4,227	100.00

Dimiao Vice-Mayoralty Election
Party	Candidate	Votes	%
Liberal	Jaime Balbon	2,972	82.74
UNA	Marcos Rara	620	17.26
Total votes		3,592	100.00

==== Duero ====
Duero Mayoralty Election
Party	Candidate	Votes	%
Liberal	Conrada Amparo	2,667	49.40
LDP	Patton Olano	1,970	36.49
UNA	Trifon Olaer	762	14.11
Total votes		5,399	100.00

Duero Vice-Mayoralty Election
Party	Candidate	Votes	%
LDP	Ronald Felisilda	2,964	57.41
Liberal	Mansueto Castino	2,017	39.07
Independent	Robert Peligro	182	3.53
Total votes		5,163	100.00

==== Garcia Hernandez ====
Garcia Hernandez Mayoralty Election
Party	Candidate	Votes	%
LDP	Tita Gallentes	6,343	61.40
Liberal	Miguelito Galendez	3,987	38.60
Total votes		10,330	100.00

Garcia Hernandez Vice-Mayoralty Election
Party	Candidate	Votes	%
LDP	Lito Dajalos	5,310	52.61
Liberal	Pio Salmasan	4,784	47.39
Total votes		10,094	100.00

==== Guindulman ====
Guindulman Mayoralty Election
Party	Candidate	Votes	%
Liberal	Maria Fe Añana-Piezas	6,433	73.40
Independent	Edgar Sarabosing	2,331	26.60
Total votes		8,764	100.00

Guindulman Vice-Mayoralty Election
Party	Candidate	Votes	%
LDP	Elpidio Bonita	4,784	52.64
Liberal	Kristine Alexie Tutor	4,305	47.36
Total votes		9,089	100.00

==== Jagna ====
Jagna Mayoralty Election
Party	Candidate	Votes	%
Aksyon	Fortunato Abrenilla	9,953	64.53
Liberal	Exuperio Lloren	5,470	35.47
Total votes		15,423	100.00

Jagna Vice-Mayoralty Election
Party	Candidate	Votes	%
Liberal	Bonifacio Virtudes	8,162	54.89
Independent	Cipriano Madera	6,708	45.11
Total votes		14,870	100.00

==== Lila ====
Incumbent Mayor Regina Salazar ran unopposed under the Liberal Party (LP) ticket.

Lila Mayoralty Election
Party	Candidate	Votes	%
Liberal	Regina Salazar	3,218	100.00
Total votes		3,218	100.00

Lila Vice-Mayoralty Election
Party	Candidate	Votes	%
Liberal	Frederick Raut	2,058	57.66
UNA	Alex Paigan	1,511	42.34
Total votes		3,569	100.00

==== Loay ====
Loay Mayoralty Election
Party	Candidate	Votes	%
Liberal	Rosemarie Lim-Imboy	4,693	62.33
PDP–Laban	Tiburcio Bullecer	2,836	37.67
Total votes		7,529	100.00

Loay Vice-Mayoralty Election
Party	Candidate	Votes	%
Liberal	Florencio Tejano	3,886	53.34
PDP–Laban	Paulino Tejano	3,399	46.66
Total votes		7,285	100.00

==== Loboc ====
Election Turnouts: ( 88.18%) 9,700 of 11,000 Registered Voters

Loboc Mayoralty Election
Party	Candidate	Votes	%
Liberal	Helen Calipusan-Alaba	5,430	57.64
NPC	Luisito Digal	3,990	42.36
Total votes		9,420	100.00

Loboc Vice-Mayoralty Election
Party	Candidate	Votes	%
Liberal	Pablito Sumampong	4,381	48.07
NPC	Purisimo Fernando	4,198	46.06
Independent	Petronilo Sarigumba	535	5.87
Total votes		9,114	100.00

==== Mabini ====
Mabini Mayoralty Election
Party	Candidate	Votes	%
Liberal	Esther Tabigue	7,297	56.51
NPC	Sancho Bernales	5,616	43.49
Total votes		12,913	100.00

Mabini Vice-Mayoralty Election
Party	Candidate	Votes	%
Liberal	Juanito Jayuma	7,236	58.25
NPC	Erwin Uy	4,152	33.42
Independent	Ernesto Fuentes	1,035	8.33
Total votes		12,423	100.00

==== Pilar ====
Pilar Mayoralty Election
Party	Candidate	Votes	%
UNA	Necitas Tabaranza-Cubrado	3,423	51.26
Liberal	Wilfredo Bernante	3,255	48.74
Total votes		6,678	100.00

Pilar Vice-Mayoralty Election
Party	Candidate	Votes	%
Liberal	Wilson Pajo	4,080	62.72
UNA	Adolfo Espuelas	2,425	37.28
Total votes		6,505	100.00

==== Sevilla ====
Sevilla Mayoralty Election
Party	Candidate	Votes	%
Nacionalista	Juliet Bucag-Dano	1,100	50.02
Liberal	Ernesita Digal	1,099	49.98
Total votes		2,199	100.00

Sevilla Vice-Mayoralty Election
Party	Candidate	Votes	%
Liberal	Victoriano Fernandez	1,137	52.88
Nacionalista	Maria Emily Daga-ang	1,013	47.12
Total votes		2,150	100.00

==== Sierra Bullones ====
Sierra Bullones Mayoralty Election
Party	Candidate	Votes	%
Liberal	Simplicio Maestrado	5,436	51.14
UNA	Rainfredo Buslon	5,194	48.86
Total votes		10,630	100.00

Sierra Bullones Vice-Mayoralty Election
Party	Candidate	Votes	%
Liberal	Alfredo Gamalo	5,265	51.62
UNA	Rey Yamaro	4,935	48.38
Total votes		10,200	100.00

==== Valencia ====
Valencia Mayoralty Election
Party	Candidate	Votes	%
Liberal	Maria Katrina Lim	3,741	56.76
UNA	Benjamin Gamalo	2,850	43.24
Total votes		6,591	100.00

Valencia Vice-Mayoralty Election
Party	Candidate	Votes	%
Liberal	Jorge Buslon	3,616	57.63
UNA	Isidro Dango	2,658	42.37
Total votes		6,274	100.00
