= John Geesnell Yap =

Filipino politician (born 1977)

John Geesnell "Baba" Yap
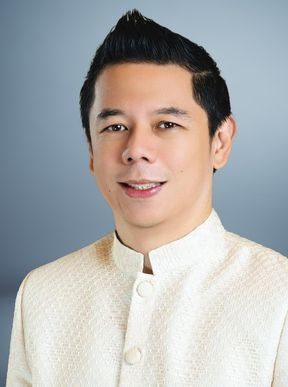
- Official portrait, 2025

Member of the Philippine House of Representatives from Bohol's 1st District
- Incumbent
- Assumed office June 30, 2025
- Preceded by: Edgar Chatto

Mayor of Tagbilaran
- In office June 30, 2013 – June 30, 2022
- Vice mayor: Jose Antonio Veloso
- Preceded by: Dan Lim
- Succeeded by: Jane Cajes Yap

City Councilor of Tagbilaran
- In office June 30, 2010 – June 30, 2013

Personal details
- Born: John Geesnell Lim Yap II; October 16, 1977 (age 49) Tagbilaran City, Bohol, Philippines
- Party: NUP (2012–2015; 2016–2024; 2026–present)
- Other political affiliations: LDP (2024–2026); Liberal (2015–2016); NPC (2009–2012)
- Spouse: Jane Cajes Yap
- Website: babayap.com
- Nickname(s): Baba, Nell

John Geesnell Lim Yap II (born October 16, 1977), popularly known as Baba Yap, is a Filipino politician who has been the representative for Bohol's first district in the House of Representatives of the Philippines since 2025. He was previously the mayor of Tagbilaran, Bohol from 2013 to 2022 until he was succeeded by his wife Jane Yap.

== Early life and education ==
Yap, is the second son of John U. Yap and Geesnell N. Lim. He finished his elementary at Holy Spirit School of Tagbilaran in 1989 and secondary at Divine Word College of Tagbilaran, now Holy Name University in 1993. He took up accountancy at the University of San Carlos in Cebu City. He became the chief accountant of their family business at Bohol Tropics Resort Club and owns a nightclub called Lazer Party Club in Tagbilaran City.

Yap is married to Jane Censoria Cajes, a former Sangguniang Kabataan Bohol provincial president and national president who is 13 years his junior. They have one daughter Janah Geesnell Yap.

== Political career ==
Yap's first stint in politics began when he was elected as city councilor of Tagbilaran City during the 2010 elections.

In 2013, he ran for mayor and won against lawyer Agustinus Gonzaga of the Liberal Party and Dr. Abraham N. Lim (UNA), the brother of then outgoing mayor, Dan Lim. At the age of 35, he became the youngest city mayor of Tagbilaran. He ran for reelection in 2016 and won.

On May 13, 2019, Yap was reelected for a 3rd consecutive term and won with a landslide.

Yap retired from politics in 2022 after serving the full three terms as City Mayor of Tagbilaran as prescribed in the Philippine Local Government Code. He supported the candidacy of his wife Jane Yap who was running to succeed him as Tagbilaran City Mayor.

He returned to the local political scene after announcing his bid to become Bohol 1st District Representative (Congressman) in the 2025 Philippine general elections. Yap won the 1st District congressional against his rival and former ally Edgar Chatto.

== Awards ==
- Ranked 2nd on the top performing mayors in the Central Visayas (2021), by RP- Mission and Development Foundation Inc. (RPMD).
- CSC PAGASA Award (Regional and National Awardee) for Outstanding Public Servants (2019)

== Electoral history ==
Electoral history of John Geesnell Yap
Year	Office	Party	Votes received				Result
Year	Office	Party	Total	%	P.	Swing	Result
2010	Councilor of Tagbilaran	NPC	26,300	—N/a	1st	—N/a	Won
2013	Mayor of Tagbilaran	NUP	14,975	38.63%	1st	—N/a	Won
2016	Mayor of Tagbilaran	Liberal	39,390	83.20%	1st	—N/a	Won
2019	Mayor of Tagbilaran	NUP	43,924	88.39%	1st	—N/a	Won
2025	Representative (Bohol–1st)	LDP	130,661	46.84%	1st	—N/a	Won

House of Representatives of the Philippines
Preceded by Edgar Chatto	Representative, 1st District of Bohol; 2025–present	Incumbent
Political offices
Preceded by Dan Neri Lim	Mayor of Tagbilaran; 2013 – 2022	Succeeded by Jane Cajes Yap
