= Eladio Jala =

Filipino lawyer and politician

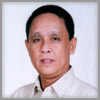
- Official portrait, 13th Congress

Member of the Philippine House of Representatives from Bohol's 3rd district
- In office June 30, 1998 – June 30, 2007
- Preceded by: Isidro C. Zarraga
- Succeeded by: Adam Jala

Commissioner of the Securities and Exchange Commission
- In office c. 2011 – c. 2014

Member of the Bohol Provincial Board
- In office June 30, 1992 – June 30, 1998

Personal details
- Born: February 18, 1949 (age 77) Loboc, Bohol, Philippines
- Party: Lakas–CMD (from 2001); Laban ng Demokratikong Pilipino (until 2001)
- Spouse: Remedios Limbago Lagrada
- Children: Adam Jala; Majesty Eve L. Jala
- Relatives: Elpidio Manliguez Jala (brother)
- Education: Divine Word College (now Holy Name University)
- Occupation: Lawyer, politician

Eladio "Boy" Manliguez Jala (born February 18, 1949) is a Filipino lawyer and politician. He served as a member of the House of Representatives of the Philippines, representing the 3rd District of Bohol from 1998 to 2007. Following his congressional tenure, he was appointed as a commissioner of the Securities and Exchange Commission (SEC).

== Early life and education ==
Eladio Manliguez Jala was born on February 18, 1949, in Loboc, Bohol, Philippines. His parents were Olegario Jala and Gregoria Pamaylaon Manliguez. He is married to Remedios Limbago Lagrada, with whom he has two children: Adam Relson L. Jala and Majesty Eve L. Jala. His son, Adam Relson, later succeeded him as the representative for Bohol's 3rd district.

Jala completed his elementary education at Loboc Central Elementary School in 1962. He attended Divine Word College (now Holy Name University) in Tagbilaran City for his secondary education (graduated 1968) and his tertiary education, earning Bachelor of Science in Education (B.S.E.) and Bachelor of Arts (AB) in political science degrees in 1972. He pursued postgraduate studies, reportedly a Bachelor of Laws (LL.B.), at the same institution, completing it in 1982 and passing the Philippine Bar Examinations in the same year.

== Early career ==
=== Educator ===
Jala began his professional career as a secondary school teacher with the Department of Education, Culture and Sports (DECS). He taught in Quinoguitan, Loboc, Bohol, from 1973 to 1976, and continued with DECS until 1982, also teaching at the Bohol School of Arts and Trades (BSAT) in Tagbilaran. His experience in education is noted to have influenced his legislative perspectives later in his career.

=== Legal practice ===
After passing the Bar in 1982, Jala embarked on a legal career. He was an active member of the Integrated Bar of the Philippines (IBP) Bohol Chapter, serving as a board director (1987–1989) and vice-president (1990–1992). He was also a long-standing member of the Free Legal Assistance Group (FLAG) since 1983 and identified as a human rights lawyer. He engaged in private law practice, particularly between 1992 and 1998.

== Political career ==
=== Provincial lawmaker ===
Jala entered elective politics as a provincial Kagawad (board member) for the 3rd District of Bohol, serving from 1992 to 1998. During his tenure, he was noted for his prolific legislative activity, sponsoring 180 resolutions and authoring 50 ordinances.

=== House of Representatives (1998–2007) ===
In 1998, Jala was elected to the House of Representatives, representing the 3rd District of Bohol. He served for three consecutive terms, until June 30, 2007. He was initially affiliated with the Laban ng Demokratikong Pilipino (LDP) party, later joining Lakas–CMD in 2001.

==== Committee leadership and memberships ====
In Congress, Jala chaired the Committee on Civil Service and Professional Regulation and was the senior vice-chairman of the Committee on Higher and Technical Education. He was also a member of numerous other committees, including those on appropriation, agriculture, justice, and public Works.

==== Legislative work ====
Jala's legislative work focused on local development for Bohol and national reforms.

- Authored/Co-authored Republic Acts:
  - Republic Act 8864: An Act Establishing a National High School in Barangay Camayaan, Municipality of Loboc, Province of Bohol, to be Known as Camayaan National High School, and Appropriating Funds Therefor.
  - Republic Act 8865: An Act Converting the Bilar High School in the Municipality of Bilar, Province of Bohol into a National High School to be Known as the Bilar National High School and Appropriating Funds Therefor.
  - Republic Act 9258 (Guidance and Counseling Act of 2004): An Act Professionalizing the Practice of Guidance and Counseling and Creating for this Purpose a Professional Regulatory Board of Guidance and Counseling, Appropriating Funds Therefor and for Other Purposes.
- Significant proposed legislation:
  - Bohol development: Filed numerous bills for road construction and conversion, establishment of high schools, and improvements to local infrastructure (ports, water systems) in Bohol.
  - Civil service and political reforms: Proposed bills related to civil service eligibility for barangay officials, stiffer penalties for election offenses, and measures against political turncoatism.
  - Environmental protection: Authored House Bill No. 01147 (13th Congress) to declare the Chocolate Hills in Bohol as national patrimony and geological monuments (not passed).
  - Bohol reapportionment: Proposed a bill to reapportion Bohol into four legislative districts (did not advance).

== Post-congressional career ==
=== Securities and Exchange Commission (SEC) ===
After his congressional terms, Jala was appointed as a commissioner of the Securities and Exchange Commission (SEC). He served in this capacity from approximately 2011/2012 to mid-2014. As part of the SEC en banc, he participated in quasi-judicial and regulatory functions, including issuing orders related to securities regulations and investor protection.

== PDAF controversy ==
Jala's name was mentioned in connection with the Priority Development Assistance Fund scam (PDAF) regarding disbursements made between 2007 and 2009. A Commission on Audit (COA) special audit, reported by the Philippine Center for Investigative Journalism (PCIJ), indicated that ₱13.720 million in PDAF notionally attributed to Jala was channeled via the Technology Resource Center (TRC) to a non-governmental organization (NGO), Kapuso’t Kapamilya Foundation, Inc. (KapKFI). The COA audit covered a period largely after Jala had left Congress in June 2007. Auditors found discrepancies, including non-confirmation of receipt by beneficiaries and unliquidated funds by the NGO.

As of a 2015 PCIJ report, there was limited Department of Justice (DOJ) interest in pursuing non-Napoles linked PDAF cases. Publicly available records (news archives, ombudsman site searches) did not show official charges filed specifically against Eladio Jala regarding this PDAF issue, nor any formal public statements from him in response. The matter, concerning Jala, remains without a definitive public legal conclusion based on the provided documentation.

== Civic engagement ==
Jala has maintained long-standing memberships in several civic and professional organizations, including:

- Free Legal Assistance Group (FLAG) (Member since 1983)
- Integrated Bar of the Philippines (IBP), Bohol Chapter (Member since 1983)
- Brotherhood of Christian Businessmen & Professionals (BCBP) (Member since 1995)
- Bohol Island Lions International Club (Member since 1996)
