= Philippine House Special Committee on Persons with Disabilities =

Special committee of the House of Representatives of the Philippines

Special Committee on Persons with Disabilities
- 20th Congress

History
- New session started: To convene on July 28, 2025

Leadership
- Chairman: Vacant
- Minority Leader: Vacant

Website
- Special Committee on Persons with Disabilities

The Philippine House Special Committee on Persons with Disabilities is a special committee of the Philippine House of Representatives.

== Jurisdiction ==
As prescribed by House Rules, the committee's jurisdiction includes the following:

- Needs, rights and welfare of persons with disabilities (PWD)
- Policies and programs that will enhance PWD active participation and integration in society

== Members, 20th Congress ==
As of June 30, 2025, all committee membership positions are vacant until the House convenes for its first regular session on July 28.

== Historical membership rosters ==
=== 18th Congress ===
Position	Members	Party	Province/City	District
Chairperson	Ma. Lourdes Arroyo	Lakas	Negros Occidental	5th
Vice Chairpersons	Pablo Ortega	NPC	La Union	1st
Vice Chairpersons	Edgar Chatto	Liberal	Bohol	1st
Vice Chairpersons	Jeffrey Khonghun	Nacionalista	Zambales	1st
Vice Chairpersons	Shirlyn Bañas-Nograles	PDP–Laban	South Cotabato	1st
Members for the Majority	Ma. Lourdes Acosta-Alba	Bukidnon Paglaum	Bukidnon	1st
Members for the Majority	Abdulmunir Arbison	Nacionalista	Sulu	2nd
Members for the Majority	Rudy Caoagdan	PDP–Laban	Cotabato	2nd
Members for the Majority	Paz Radaza	Lakas	Lapu-Lapu City	Lone
Members for the Majority	Christian Unabia	Lakas	Misamis Oriental	1st
Members for the Majority	Michael Defensor	ANAKALUSUGAN	Party-list	
Members for the Majority	Amihilda Sangcopan	Anak Mindanao	Party-list	
Members for the Majority	Roger Mercado	Lakas	Southern Leyte	Lone
Members for the Majority	Dahlia Loyola	NPC	Cavite	5th

== See also ==
- House of Representatives of the Philippines
- List of Philippine House of Representatives committees
