= Mayor of Tagbilaran =

Local chief executive of Tagbilaran City, Philippines

- Punong sa Dakbayan sa Tagbilaran
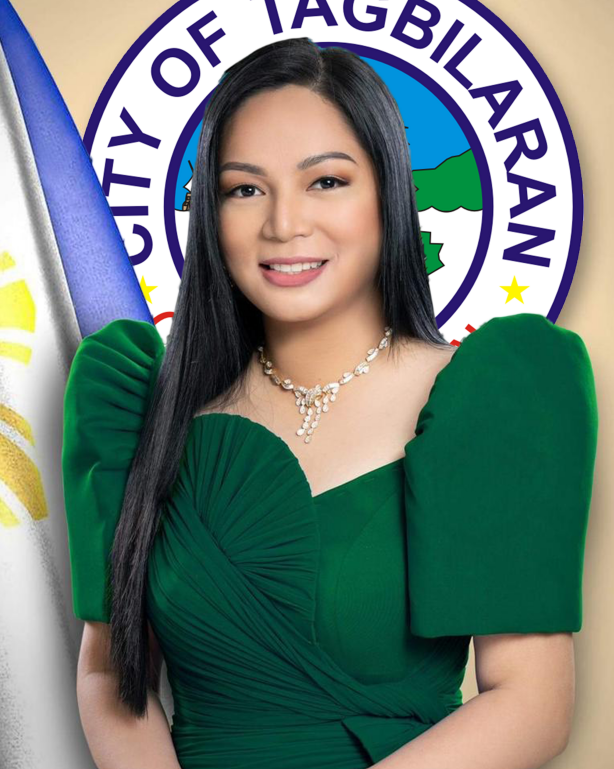
- Incumbent; Jane Cajes Yap since June 30, 2022
- Style: The Honorable
- Seat: Tagbilaran City Hall, Tagbilaran City, Bohol
- Appointer: Elected via popular vote
- Term length: 3 years, renewable twice consecutively
- Inaugural holder: Calixto Marcos (as Gobernadorcillo); Claudio Gallares (as Municipal President); Honorio Grupo (as Municipal Mayor); Venancio Inting (as City Mayor)
- Formation: 1742 (as Gobernadorcillo); 1900 (as Municipal President); 1939 (as Municipal Mayor); 1966 (as City Mayor)
- Succession: Vice Mayor then Highest ranking Sangguniang Panlungsod member
- Deputy: Vice Mayor
- Website: City Government of Tagbilaran

The mayor of Tagbilaran (Cebuano: Punong Dakbayan sa Tagbilaran, Filipino: Alkalde ng Tagbilaran) is the Local Chief Executive of the City of Tagbilaran, the capital city of the Province of Bohol in the Philippines. The Mayor is in charge of the executive department of the city with the Vice Mayor taking charge of the legislative department. His powers are provided for and limited by R.A. 7160 or the Local Government Code of 1991.

== List of chief executives ==
=== Chief Executives of Tagbilaran since 1742 ===
==== Gobernadorcillo ====
Term		Title	Name
	1742	Gobernadorcillo	Calixto Marcos
1744 –	1829	Sector Leader of Dagohoy	Calixto Sotero
unknown		Gobernadorcillo	Martin Flores
unknown		Gobernadorcillo	Manuel de la Peña
	1832	Gobernadorcillo	Leonardo Guillermo
	1854	Gobernadorcillo	Leon Torralba
	1855	Gobernadorcillo	Francisco Reales
	1856	Gobernadorcillo	Esteban Butalid
	1857	Gobernadorcillo	Alejandro Fama
	1870	Gobernadorcillo	Pedro Matig‑a
	1876	Gobernadorcillo	Felipe Rocha
c.	1880	Gobernadorcillo	Jacinto Borja y Borja
c.	1885	Gobernadorcillo	Flaviano Ramirez
c.	1892	Gobernadorcillo	Manuel Miñoza
	1898	Gobernadorcillo	Eduardo Calceta

==== Presidente Municipal ====
Term		Title	Name
19 May 1898 –	Apr 1899	Presidente Municipal	Salustiano Borja
Apr 1899 –	17 May 1900	Presidente Municipal	Margarito Torralba

==== Municipal President ====
Term		Title	Name
	1900	Municipal President	Claudio Gallares
1901 –	1902	Municipal President	Aniceto Clarin
1 Apr 1902 –	1903	Municipal President	Macario Sarmiento
1904 –	1905	Municipal President	Servando Matig‑a
	1906	Municipal President	Mariano Parras
	1907	Municipal President	Margarito Torralba
	1908	Municipal President	Gaudencio Mendoza
	1909	Municipal President	Lorenzo Torralba
	1910	Municipal President	Felipe Sarmiento
	1911	Municipal President	Miguel Parras
	1912	Municipal President	Nicolas Butalid
19 Oct 1912 –	1916	Municipal President	Celestino Gallares
6 Oct 1916 –	24 May 1918	Municipal President	Jacinto Remolador
25 May 1918 –	1919	Municipal President	Gregorio Peñaflor
1920 –	1922	Municipal President	Felipe Sarmiento
1923 –	1925	Municipal President	Timoteo Butalid
1926 –	1931	Municipal President	Andres Torralba
1931 –	1938	Municipal President	Genaro Visarra

==== Municipal Mayor ====
Term		Title	Name
1939 –	1941	Municipal Mayor	Honorio Grupo
22 May 1942 –	1945	Municipal Mayor	Manuel Espuelas
26 May 1945 –	1946	Municipal Mayor	Mariano Rocha
Apr 1946 –	Aug 1946	Municipal Mayor	Manuel Espuelas
2 Sep 1946 –	Dec 1947	Municipal Mayor	Honorio Grupo
1 Jan 1948 –	31 Dec 1959	Municipal Mayor	Pedro Belderol
(3 terms)		Municipal Mayor	Pedro Belderol

==== City Mayor ====
Term		Title	Image	Name
1 Jan 1960 –	31 Dec 1971	City Mayor		Venancio Inting
(3 terms)		City Mayor		Venancio Inting
1 Jan 1972 –	31 Dec 1979	City Mayor		Rolando Butalid
(2 terms)		City Mayor		Rolando Butalid
1 Jan 1980 –	Mar 1986	City Mayor		Jose Ma. Rocha
(3 terms)		City Mayor		Jose Ma. Rocha
19 Mar 1986 –	18 Jan 1987	OIC City Mayor		Dan Lim
19 Jan 1987 –	1 Dec 1987	OIC City Mayor		Jose Torralba
2 Dec 1987 –	6 Dec 1987	OIC City Mayor		Carmen Gatal
7 Dec 1987 –	17 May 1988	OIC City Mayor		Bonifacio Libay
18 May 1988 –	23 Jun 1988	OIC City Mayor		Ismael Villamor
24 Jun 1988 –	30 Jun 1992	City Mayor		Jose Torralba
30 Jun 1992 –	30 Jun 1995	City Mayor		Jose Ma. Rocha
30 Jun 1995 –	30 Jun 2004	City Mayor		Jose Torralba
(3 terms)		City Mayor		Jose Torralba
30 Jun 2004 –	30 Jun 2013	City Mayor		Dan Lim
(3 terms)		City Mayor		Dan Lim
30 Jun 2013 –	30 June 2022	City Mayor		John Geesnell Yap
(3 terms)		City Mayor		John Geesnell Yap
30 Jun 2022 –	present	City Mayor		Jane Cajes Yap
