= Jane Cajes Yap =

Filipina politician

The Honorable Jane Cajes-Yap
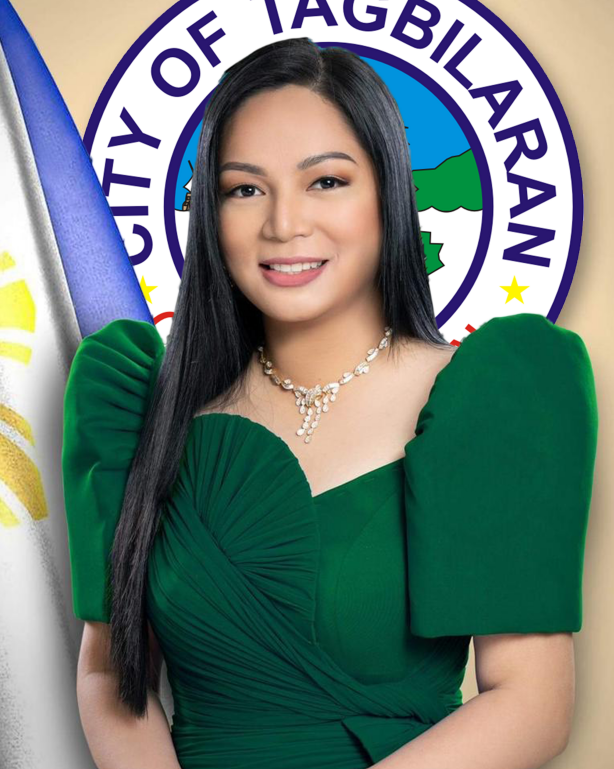
- Official portrait, 2025

Mayor of Tagbilaran
- Incumbent
- Assumed office 30 June 2022
- Vice mayor: Adam Jala
- Preceded by: John Geesnell Yap

6th President of the Sangguniang Kabataan
- In office February 2008 – February 2011
- Preceded by: Milton Isagani Mendador
- Succeeded by: Gabriel Louise del Rosario

Member of the National Youth Commission
- In office 2007–2010
- Preceded by: Milton Isagani Mendador
- Succeeded by: Gabriel Louise del Rosario

Chairman of the Sangguniang Kabataan Bohol
- In office 2007–2010

Personal details
- Born: Jane Censoria del Rosario Cajes; January 10, 1990 (age 36) Cebu City, Philippines
- Party: PFP (2024–present)
- Other political affiliations: NUP (2021–2024)
- Spouse(s): John Geesnell Yap (m. 2011–present)
- Parent(s): Roberto Cajes; Judith Cajes
- Education: Ateneo de Manila University
- Occupation: Politician youth leader
- Profession: Businesswoman

Jane Censoria Cajes-Yap (born Jane Censoria del Rosario Cajes; January 10, 1990) is a Filipino politician who is known as a former president of the Sangguniang Kabataan (SK) or Youth Council in the Philippines and the incumbent city mayor of Tagbilaran, Bohol since 2022. She is married to former Tagbilaran city mayor John Geesnell Yap. After winning the SK presidency in Bohol, Philippines, Cajes was elected president in the National SK Federation and with her position, also earned her a concomitant role as the Ex Officio Commissioner of the National Youth Commission (NYC). She is the first woman to hold the mayorship of the city since its founding charter.

== Background ==
Cajes is the second child of incumbent and former Trinidad, Bohol Mayors Roberto Cajes and Judith Cajes, respectively. She completed her elementary and secondary education at the Holy Spirit School of Tagbilaran in Tagbilaran City. She studied at the Assumption College San Lorenzo for one year before transferring to the Ateneo de Manila University.

Cajes was the first woman to be elected president in the SK National Federation, and was the second president of SK National Federation who hailed from outside the Luzon area (the first being Ryan Culima of Butuan). This made her the President of the federation with the help of former Governor Erico B. Aumentado who convinced all governors to support her as the president of the federation.

She married then-Tagbilaran City Councillor and businessman John Geesnell Yap on February 5, 2011, at the age of 21. The wedding was called the "Wedding of the Year" in Bohol.

== SK term and Political Career ==
In her first year of term, Cajes initiated the Tri-Media Program, said to be the first in SK history to provide information about the Filipino youth. The said project composed of three components on the media- the internet, newspaper and radio. Various youth issues, concerns and other youth interest are tackled in the program. The first component is skbohol.com, the first SK website in the Philippines. The second component is the quarterly publication, the SK Today. The maiden issue of SK Today was in December 2005. The SK on Air, the official radio program made its first airing on April 2, 2006.

Cajes attended the Plan International London Incorporated on October 8–9, 2008 in Woking, Surrey, United Kingdom, to serve as one of the panelists to interview the applicants for the new CEO of the Plan International London.

As mandated by law, the first SK National Congress was held in Cebu City. It was the highest attendance in SK history according to the Malacañang Presidential Management Staff. Cajes also led the Samahang Kabataan Volunteers Club to help the SK Bohol Federation for the implementation of its programs. The first batch, composed of 19 student leaders and SK chairmen from the province, were known as Bolahan. The second batch of SKVC has 26 members. In December 2008, Cajes led the Sangguniang Kabtaan (SK) Kabataan Awards was created to recognize the SK leaders. Award-winning reporter and documentary host Kara Patria David was the honored guest on the selection of the Sangguniang Kabataan (SK) Ten Outstanding Chairmen year 2 on November 29, 2008.

In 2022, Cajes-Yap ran for the Mayoral seat of her husband John Geesnell “Baba” Yap of Tagbilaran City. The outgoing mayor supported her candidacy, and she won as the city’s first woman Mayor in the 2022 Philippine General Election. The new mayor was sworn into office on July 1, 2022 coinciding the 65th charter day of Tagbilaran City. She eventually won reelection in the 2025 Philippine General Election and is the incumbent Mayor of the City of Tagbilaran, Bohol.

== Awards ==
Cajes has been honored by several award-giving bodies for her accomplishments as a youth leader. She has been named one of the country's "Twenty-five Hottest Young Personalities Under Twenty-Five" in 2010. She has also been the conferred as one of "The Outstanding Young Men" (TOYM) under the youth leadership category in 2010, a recognition of great prestige given by Junior Chamber International Philippines (formerly Philippine Jaycees). Moreover, Cajes was chosen as one of five recipients of 2009 "Outstanding Youth Leader Award" by the Office of the President in Malacañang.

== Controversies ==
In April 2010, Cajes was charged before the Office of the Ombudsman-Visayas in Cebu City for the lack of transparency in her various financial dealings as SK National President and for supposedly flaunting her wealth. However, Cajes denied the charges, claiming that allegations are part of a black propaganda orchestrated by their political opponents.

During the SK National Congress 2010 held from July 28 to 30, 2010 in Panglao, Bohol, the participants urged Cajes to present financial statements during her term. The local newspapers in Bohol reported that the SK members claimed they already demanded for the financial report which Cajes failed to deliver. Allegedly unaccounted expenses included PhP10 million provided in 2008 by the Presidential Fund, PhP10 million given in 2009 by Department of Environment and Natural Resources, financial statements (FS) in 2008 regarding the hosting of Congress in Cebu, FS of 2009 congress held in Subic Bay, and FS of National Convention and launching of Sama-sama Para sa Kalikasan held in Bohol.

The participants insisted that Cajes should likewise render her report on the donations coming from the Philippines Charity Sweepstakes Office, Philippine Amusement and Gaming Corporation, Department of National Defense and other private donors such as The Bar.

Her former staffer Manuel Ferdinand De Erio and SK volunteer and publicist Leo Udtohan resigned after they allegedly discovered Cajes failure to present her financial statements for transparency and accountability. De Erio and Udtohan filed a complaint before the Ombudsman against Cajes on October 20, 2010. In February 2013, the case against Cajes-Yap was thrown out of court.

| Preceded by John Geesnell Yap | Mayor of Tagbilaran; 2022 – present | Succeeded by Incumbent |
