= Roberto Cajes =

Filipino politician

Mayor of Trinidad, Bohol
- Incumbent
- Assumed office June 30, 2022
- Preceded by: Judith del Rosario-Cajes
- In office June 30, 2010 – June 30, 2013
- Preceded by: Judith del Rosario-Cajes
- Succeeded by: Judith del Rosario-Cajes

Member of the House of Representatives of the Philippines from Bohol's 2nd congressional district
- In office June 30, 2001 – June 30, 2010
- Preceded by: Erico B. Aumentado
- Succeeded by: Erico Aristotle Aumentado

Member of the Bohol Provincial Board
- In office June 30, 1992 – June 30, 2001
- Succeeded by: Amalia Reyes Tirol

Personal details
- Born: October 10, 1950 (age 75) Tagbilaran City, Bohol, Philippines
- Party: Laban ng Demokratikong Pilipino (LDP) (2024–present); PDP–Laban (2021–2024); National Unity Party (NUP) (2016–2021); Liberal Party (2010–2016); Lakas–CMD (until 2010, including during the 13th and 14th Congress)
- Spouse: Judith del Rosario-Cajes
- Children: 5, including Jane Censoria Cajes-Yap and Joan Robie Cajes-Imboy
- Education: University of Santo Tomas (AB Philosophy, Theology); San Carlos Seminary (Theology); University of Bohol (MA Philosophy, PhD); Holy Name University (Bachelor of Laws)
- Occupation: Lawyer, politician

Roberto Castaño Cajes (born October 8, 1950) is a Filipino lawyer and politician. He is the incumbent mayor of Trinidad, Bohol, having won re-election in the May 2025 local elections. Cajes previously served as mayor from 2010 to 2013, and from 2022 to 2025. He also represented the Second District of Bohol in the House of Representatives of the Philippines for three consecutive terms (2001–2010). Before his congressional tenure, he was a member of the Bohol Provincial Board (1992–2001).

== Early life and education ==
Roberto Cajes was born on October 8, 1950, in Tagbilaran City, Bohol. While his official birthplace is Tagbilaran City, he is strongly associated with Trinidad, Bohol, where he completed his elementary education and which has been his long-time political base.

He attended Trinidad Central Elementary School (1957–1963) and the Immaculate Heart of Mary Seminary for his secondary education (1964–1968).

Cajes earned a Bachelor of Arts in philosophy (Magna Cum Laude, 1972) and studied theology at the University of Santo Tomas (1968–1972). He continued his theological studies at San Carlos Seminary (1973–1975). He later obtained a Master of Arts in Philosophy (1978) and a Doctor of Philosophy (Magna Cum Laude, 1984) from the University of Bohol. Cajes also holds a Bachelor of Laws degree (Magna Cum Laude, 1984) from Holy Name University (formerly Divine Word College of Tagbilaran).

== Ecclesiastical and academic career ==
Before entering politics, Cajes served as a Roman Catholic priest. His pastoral assignments included the Immaculate Conception Parish in Baclayon, St. Michael the Archangel Parish in Jagna, and St. Anthony de Padua Parish in Sikatuna. He also served as Chaplain for the Knights of Columbus Parish in Tagbilaran City.

Concurrently, Cajes was a professor at the Immaculate Heart of Mary Seminary in Tagbilaran City and at the Graduate School of the University of Bohol.

== Legal career ==
Cajes is a lawyer by profession and managed the Roberto Cajes Law Office in Talibon.

== Political career ==
=== Bohol Provincial Board member (1992–2001) ===
Cajes began his political career as a member of the Bohol Provincial Board, serving two non-consecutive terms: 1992–1995 and 1998–2001.

=== Member of the House of Representatives (2001–2010) ===
Cajes represented the Second District of Bohol for three consecutive terms (12th, 13th, and 14th Congresses). He was primarily affiliated with Lakas–CMD during his congressional tenure.

Key roles during his time in Congress included:

- 12th Congress (2001–2004):
  - Senior Vice Chairman, Committee on Transportation and Telecommunications.
  - Led a notable ethics investigation in Germany.
  - First Boholano congressman to be a member of the House of Representatives Electoral Tribunal (HRET).
- 13th Congress (2004–2007):
  - Chairman, Committee on Ethics and Privileges.
  - Vice Chairman, Committee on Revision of Laws.
  - Member of committees including: Agrarian Reform, Basic Education and Culture, Energy, Games and Amusements, Higher and Technical Education, Labor and Employment, and Public Works and Highways.
- 14th Congress (2007–2010):
  - Represented the 2nd District of Bohol. (Detailed committee assignments for this term require further sourcing but he continued his legislative work.)

Across his terms, he authored and filed numerous House Bills.

=== Mayor of Trinidad, Bohol ===
Cajes has served multiple terms as Mayor of Trinidad.

- His first term was from June 30, 2010, to June 30, 2013.
- He was elected again for the term beginning June 30, 2022, and ending June 30, 2025.
- In the May 2025 local elections, Cajes won re-election under the Laban ng Demokratikong Pilipino (LDP) party. He secured 12,345 votes, representing 50.26% of the total votes, for a new term starting June 30, 2025.
- Prior to the 2025 election, he formed a political alliance named "Alayon Trinidad" with former political opponent Juanilo "Johnny" Gonzales Orioque, endorsing Governor Aris Aumentado and Congresswoman Vanvan Aumentado.

Under his leadership (primarily referring to the 2022-2025 term for recent awards), the Municipality of Trinidad received several recognitions, including the 2024 Seal of Good Local Governance (SGLG) from the Department of the Interior and Local Government (DILG).

== Achievements and recognition ==
- As Congressman (primarily during the 12th Congress based on CV):
  - "30 Most Outstanding Neophyte Congressmen of 12th Congress" (conferred by Congress Magazine, Makati Graduate School, Reserve Soldiers Union)
  - "Legislator par Excellence (2002)" (by International Civic Advancement for Recovery & Excellence, Inc.)
  - "Outstanding Congressman of the Year (2002)" (by Development of the Filipino Youth Inc.)
  - "Congressman of the Year, Public Servant of the Philippines for 2002" (by Philippine Media Enforcers, Inc.)
- As Mayor:
  - Municipality of Trinidad received the 2024 Seal of Good Local Governance (SGLG).
  - Recognition for Ideal Functionality Level for the Local Council for the Protection of Children (LCPC).
  - Top 2 Best in Procurement in Region 7 by DSWD KALAHI.
- Academic Honors:
  - Magna Cum Laude, AB Philosophy, University of Santo Tomas (1972)
  - Magna Cum Laude, Doctor of Philosophy, University of Bohol (1984)
  - Magna Cum Laude, Bachelor of Laws, Holy Name University (1984)

== Personal life ==
Roberto Cajes is married to Judith del Rosario-Cajes. They have five children: Michael, Frances Bobbith, Jane Censoria Cajes-Yap (former Sangguniang Kabataan National President and politician), Joan Robie Cajes-Imboy (current Sangguniang Bayan Member of Trinidad and his running mate for Vice Mayor in the 2025 elections), and Robie Rose.
