= Dan Lim =

Filipino politician

Dan Neri Lim

Mayor of Tagbilaran
- In office June 30, 2004 – June 30, 2013
- Preceded by: Jose V. Torralba
- Succeeded by: John Geesnell Yap
- In office March 19, 1986 – January 18, 1987; Officer In Charge
- Preceded by: Jose Ma. Rocha
- Succeeded by: Jose V. Torralba

City Administrator of Tagbilaran
- In office 1988–1992

Member of the Tagbilaran City Council
- In office 1980–1986

Personal details
- Born: February 11, 1952 (age 74) Tagbilaran City, Bohol
- Party: Independent (1995–2004, 2024–present)
- Other political affiliations: LDP (1995); PMP (2004–2006, 2021–2024); NPC (2006–2021)
- Spouse: Dr. Sharleen C. Lim
- Education: Philippine Union College; Silliman University
- Occupation: Public servant
- Profession: Lawyer, politician, businessman

Dan Neri Lim (born February 11, 1952) is a Filipino politician who served as mayor of Tagbilaran, from 1986 to 1987, and from 2004 to 2013.

== Early life ==
His father is Segundo Soriano Lim, a direct descendant of one of the first three Chinese nationals whose business prospered in Bohol even before the Second World War. Mr. Segundo Lim is still an active member of the city's business circle. Dan's mother is Gloria Basa Neri, from Ozamiz. At one time, she took the cudgels as vice mayor of Tagbilaran City and presiding officer of the Sangguniang Panlungsod.

Dan Lim was born on February 11, 1952, and is married to the former Dr. Sharleen Mathay Corral of Makati.

Lim studied at the East Visayan Academy in Cebu City and finished his secondary education at Rafael Palma College (now University of Bohol) in 1968. He enrolled at the Philippine Union College in Caloocan for his bachelor's degree in political science, which he finished in 1972. He went to Dumaguete and enrolled at Silliman University for his Bachelor of Laws. He graduated in 1977 and passed the bar that same year.

Lim joined the faculty of Philippine Union College the following year, where he taught Philippine Constitution, political science, and negotiable instrument as a part-timer. Simultaneously he accepted the offer of Assemblyman Liliano Basa Neri of Region 10 as his chief of staff. Then he joined Goco, Neri, Bucero, Primisias Law Office, where later he became a partner replacing Atty. Neri. Atty. Lim is a member of Law Asia, an association of lawyers all over the Asian countries. He was also the chief of staff of the Integrated Bar of the Philippines before Atty. Liliano Neri became an assemblyman.

== Political career ==
In 1980 he came back to Tagbilaran and became a councilor for six years. In 1986, when Corazon Aquino became president after the EDSA People Power Revolution, he was appointed OIC mayor of Tagbilaran City. From 1988 to 1992, when Jose Ma. Rocha became mayor he was the City Administrator. It was during this time that Tagbilaran was given national acceptance in a privilege speech by Senator Juan Flavier, making the Tagbilaran City Cooperative Hospital a model in the country.

Lim has his share of political defeats, losing in his congressional bid and then losing to Jose V. Torralba twice for mayor, the last time in 2001. His time came in 2004 when he defeated Betty Torralba, the wife of last-termer Mayor Jose V. Torralba, for mayor of Tagbilaran. Lim won together with only one councilor in his lineup. He was the mayor from 2004 to 2013.

In his first term, Mayor Lim prioritized social services by introducing the Blue Card System, a free hospitalization program for indigents; Free School Supplies and Uniforms Project for Public School Students; Botika sa Katawhan, a free medicine program for all residents; promotion of sports like boxing, student welfare, livelihood, among others. Lim reached out to the masses by interacting with them through the top-rated weekly Mayor's Report over a local radio station.

In the local elections of 2007, mayor Lim won again by defeating the returning Jose V. Torralba for mayor by a wide margin, and this time also winning the majority of councilors in his lineup. In his second term, he continued all his projects adding other projects like senior citizens' privileges, police visibility, among others.

Mayor Lim tossed his hat in for reelection for a third and final term in 2010 together with former vice mayor Nuevas Tirol-Montes as his running mate along with a complete 10-person councilor slate under the Nationalist People's Coalition (NPC) Party. He won his third term and left office in 2013.

== Sources ==
- DAN NERI LIM MAN OF THE HOUR
- MAYOR DAN NERI LIM?S PASSION FOR BOXING
