= Edgar Chatto =

Filipino lawyer and politician

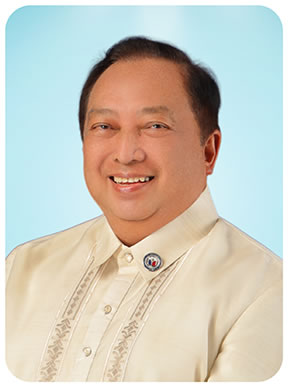
- Official portrait, 19th Congress

Member of the Philippine House of Representatives from Bohol's 1st District
- In office June 30, 2019 – June 30, 2025
- Preceded by: Rene Relampagos
- Succeeded by: John Geesnell Yap
- In office June 30, 2001 – June 30, 2010
- Preceded by: Ernesto Herrera
- Succeeded by: Rene Relampagos

25th Governor of Bohol
- In office June 30, 2010 – June 30, 2019
- Vice Governor: Concepcion Lim (2010–2016); Dionisio Balite Sr. (2016–2019)
- Preceded by: Erico Aumentado
- Succeeded by: Arthur C. Yap

Vice Governor of Bohol
- In office June 30, 1995 – June 30, 2001
- Governor: Rene Relampagos
- Preceded by: Rene Relampagos
- Succeeded by: Julius Caesar Herrera

Mayor of Balilihan
- In office February 2, 1988 – June 30, 1995
- Preceded by: Elias Baquero
- Succeeded by: Eladio Chatto

Personal details
- Born: Edgardo Migriño Chatto; February 21, 1960 (age 66) Malate, Manila, Philippines
- Party: NUP (2021–present)
- Other political affiliations: Liberal (2010–2021); Lakas-CMD (until 2010)
- Spouse: Maria Pureza Veloso Chatto
- Children: 1
- Website: http://www.edgarchatto.com

Edgardo Migriño Chatto (born February 21, 1960), more commonly known as Edgar Chatto, is a Filipino lawyer and politician who served as the representative of the 1st congressional district of Bohol from 2019-2025. He previously served in that position from 2001 to 2010. He served as Governor of the Province of Bohol for three terms from 2010 to 2019. Chatto was also Vice-Governor of Bohol for two terms from 1995-2001.

== Biography and career ==
Edgardo Migriño Chatto was born on February 21, 1960, in Malate, Manila, the son of Eladio Chatto and the former Mayor of Balilihan, Bohol, Victoria Migriño Chatto. A consistent honor student, he finished both his elementary and secondary education at the Divine Word College of Tagbilaran (now Holy Name University), in 1973 and 1979 respectively. He finished Bachelor in Economics at the University of the Philippines School of Economics in Diliman, Quezon City in April 1981. He attended the Ateneo de Manila University for his Bachelor in Laws (1984–1988) and graduated at the Holy Name University in 1988. He finished his Masters in Government Management at the Pamantasan ng Lungsod ng Maynila Graduate School of Business and Management as a DILG-LGA scholar in April 1998. In 1991, he finished the Local Administration and Development Course at the University of the Philippines. He also attended the John F. Kennedy School of Government at Harvard University in Massachusetts, U.S. in 1999.

Chatto was faculty member of the Divine Word College of Tagbilaran from 1981 to 1982.

He is married to Maria Pureza Chatto (nee Veloso) with whom he has one daughter, Esther Patrisha Veloso Chatto.

Chatto, with Call Sign DW7BDC, holds a Technician Class Amateur Radio License.

=== Political career ===
He started his political career as board member of the Province of Bohol representing the youth sector when he served as president of the Kabataang Barangay from 1980 to 1986. In 1988, he was elected as municipal mayor of the municipality of Balilihan, Bohol and served until 1995. He became Vice Governor of the province of Bohol and served as vice governor from 1995 - 2001. From 2001 up to 2010, he was a member of the House of Representatives as representative of the first district of Bohol. In the May 10, 2010, elections, he won as the 25th Governor of the Province of Bohol, Philippines.

In 2019 as his third and final term as Governor was about to end, he decided to run again for his old seat as Representative (Congressman) for the 1st District of Bohol which he eventually won.

Chatto wanted to serve for his third and last remaining term as a representative, but was defeated by his former ally and Ex-Tagbilaran Mayor Baba Yap in the 2025 Philippine General Election.

=== Committee Membership ===
As a congressman from 2001 to 2010, Chatto was the Chairman of the House Committee on Tourism and Senior Vice Chairman of the House Committee on Agriculture, Food and Fisheries. He also had memberships in the House Committees on Accounts; Basic Education and Culture; Ethics; Foreign Affairs; Games and Amusement; Higher and Technical Education; Labor and Employment; Legislative Franchises; Local Government; Public Works and Highways; Revision of Laws; Ways and Means; and Justice.

Since 2019, he is the current Chairman of the House Committee on Climate Change and Vice Chairman of the House Special Committee on Persons with Disabilities, and on Tourism. He is also a member for the majority in the House Committee on Economic Affairs.

== Awards ==
- National Centennial Lingkod Bayan Awardee for Outstanding Work Performance (2000) - Civil Service Commission
- National Dangal Ng Bayan Award (2011) - Civil Service Commission
- Doña Aurora Aragon Quezon Award for Highly Distinguished Leadership in Promoting Humanitarian Objectives (1997) - Philippine National Red Cross
- One of the Ten Outstanding Boholanos Around the World (1998) - Confederation of Boholanos in the USA and Canada and the First Consolidated Bank
- Most Outstanding Vice Governor of the Philippines (1997) - League of Vice Governors of the Philippines
- Most Outstanding Mayor of the Philippines (1991)
- National Presidential Leadership Award for Outstanding Youth Leaders (1985) - Parangal sa Pamumuno
- Most Outstanding Alumnus for Government Service (1996) - Ship for Southeast Asian Youth Program (SSEAYP)
- Lesage Award, Most Outstanding Alumnus for Government Service (1997) - Holy Name University (formerly Divine Word College of Tagbilaran)
- Most Outstanding Youth Leader of Bohol - Philippine National Red Cross
- Leadership Awards from different institutions:
  - Holy Name University
  - Gerry Roxas Foundation
  - Science Foundation of the Philippines
  - Kabataang Barangay
  - Local Admin. & Dev’t Program Alumni Association of the Philippines
  - National And Regional Recognitions by:
  - National Gold HAMIS Award (Health and Management Information System)
  - Galing Pook Award
  - Clean and Green Contest
