= Loboc =

Municipality in Bohol, Philippines

- Municipality
- Municipality of Loboc
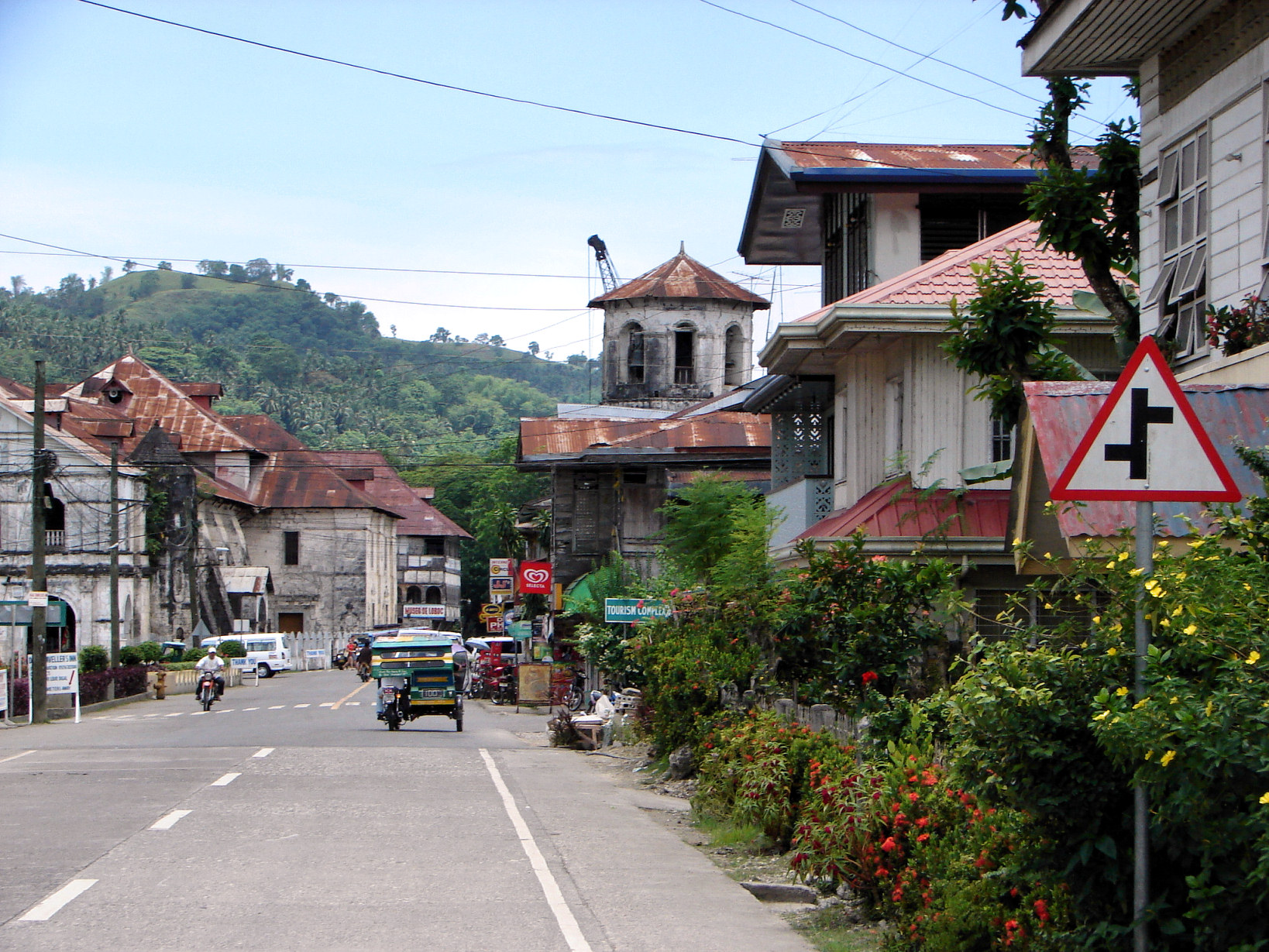
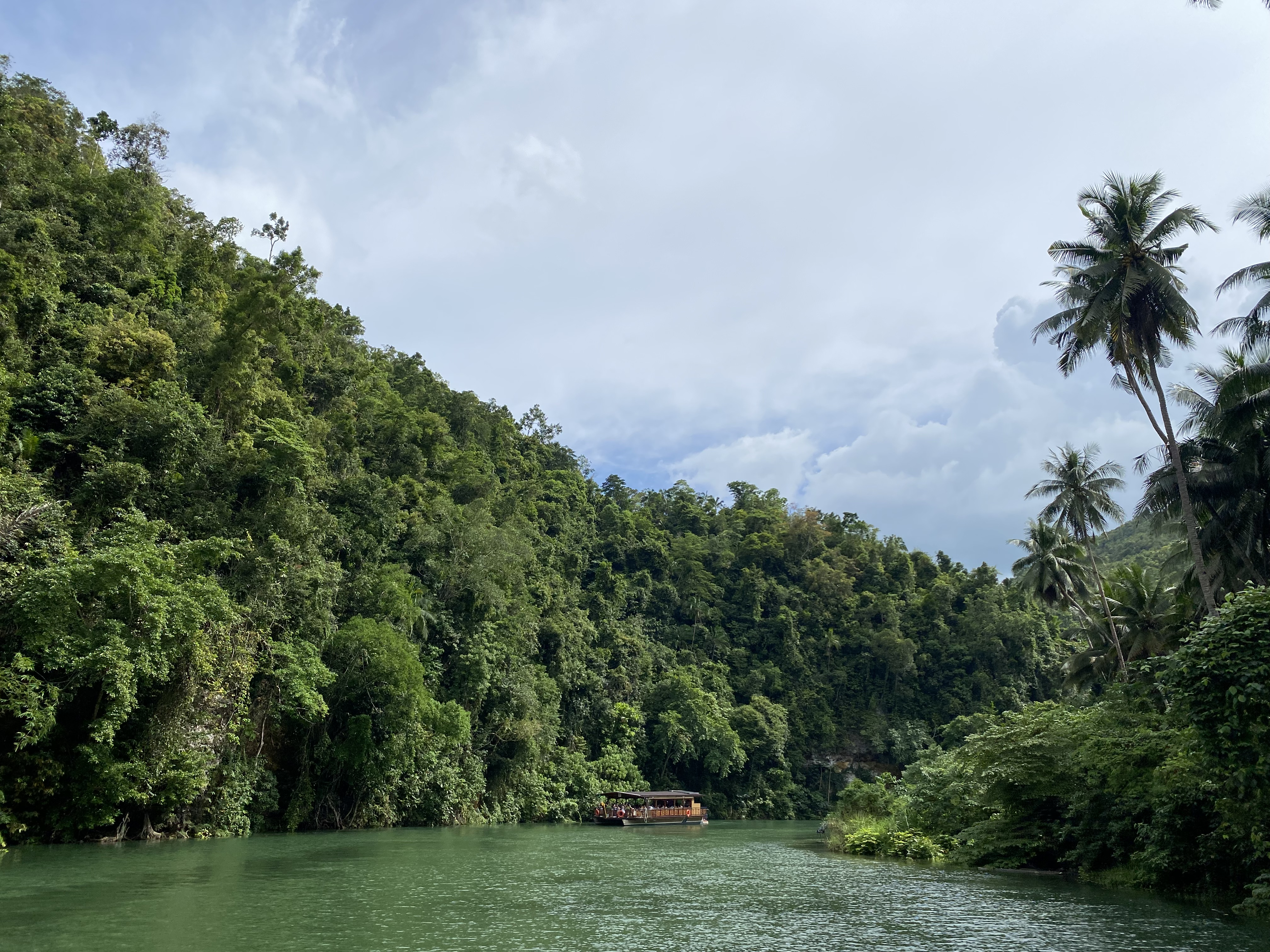
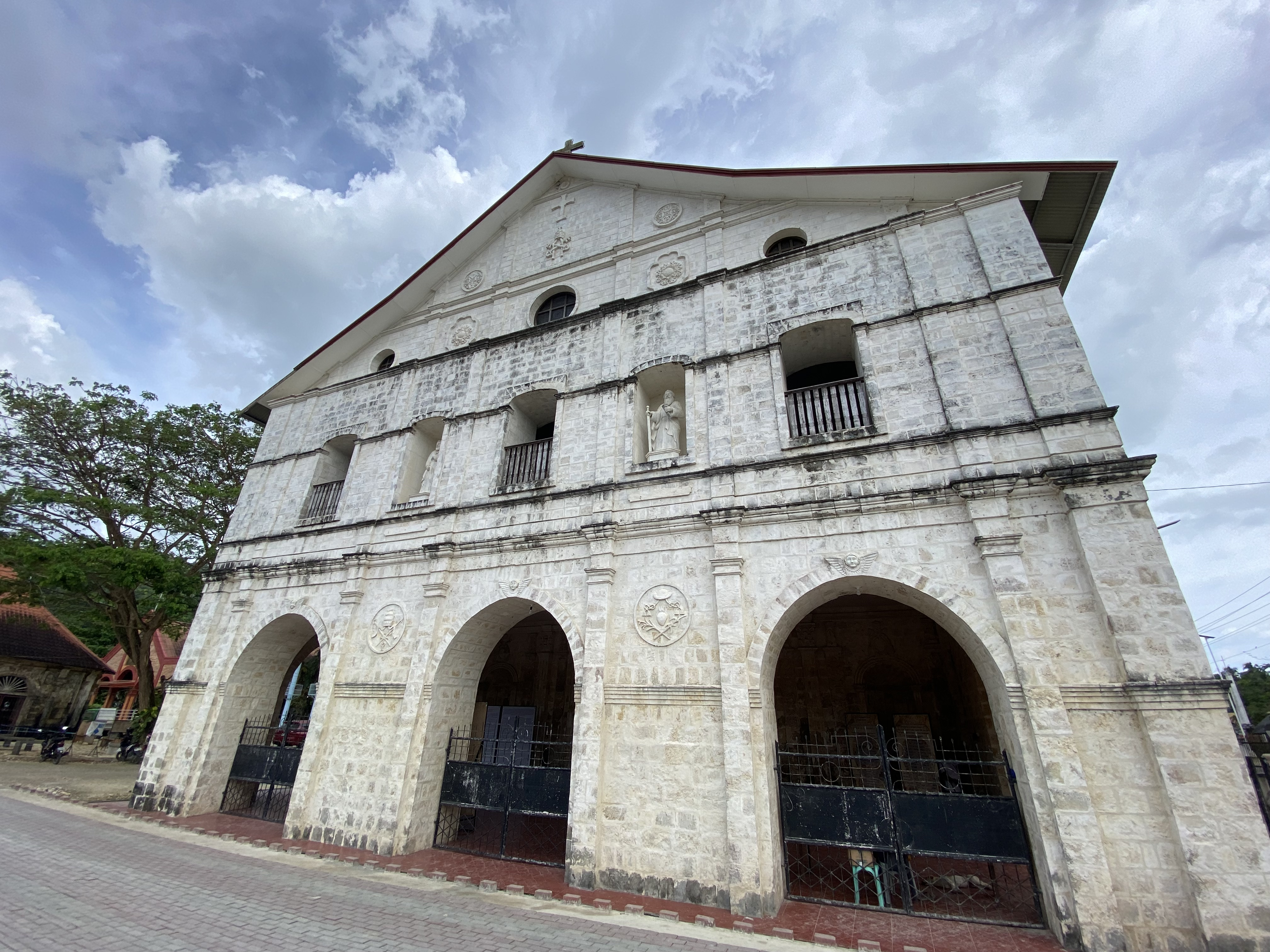
- Poblacion Loboc River Loboc Church

- Flag Flag (reverse)

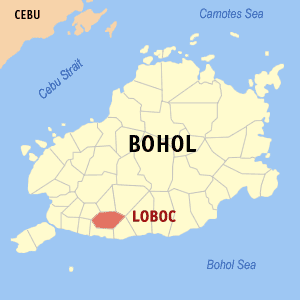
- Map of Bohol with Loboc highlighted
- Interactive map of Loboc
- Location within the Philippines
- Coordinates: 9°38′N 124°02′E
- Country: Philippines
- Region: Central Visayas
- Province: Bohol
- District: 3rd district
- Founded: 1602
- Barangays: 28 (see Barangays)

Government
  - Type: Sangguniang Bayan
  - Mayor: Leon A. Calipusan
  - Vice Mayor: Pablio D. Sumampong
  - Representative: Kristine Alexie B. Tutor
  - Councilors: List: • Boniefer Baguio; • Raymond Jala; • German Palapar; • Luisito Digal; • Silvestre Maghuyop; • Jansyl Lovan Tumanda; • Asterio Calacar; • George Calipusan
  - Electorate: 14,163 voters (2025)

Area
  - Total: 57.65 km^{2} (22.26 sq mi)
- Elevation: 131 m (430 ft)
- Highest elevation: 500 m (1,600 ft)
- Lowest elevation: 0 m (0 ft)

Population (2024 census)
  - Total: 17,338
  - Density: 300.7/km^{2} (778.9/sq mi)
  - Households: 3,958

Economy
  - Income class: 3rd municipal income class
  - Poverty incidence: 15.94% (2023)
  - Revenue: ₱ 226 million (2024)
  - Assets: ₱ 559.4 million (2024)
  - Expenditure: ₱ 55.57 million (2024)
  - Liabilities: ₱ 105.7 million (2024)

Service provider
  - Electricity: Bohol 1 Electric Cooperative (BOHECO 1)
- Time zone: UTC+8 (PST)
- ZIP code: 6316
- PSGC: 071229000
- IDD : area code: +63 (0)38
- Native languages: Boholano dialect Cebuano; Tagalog
- Website: www.lobocbohol.gov.ph

Loboc, officially the Municipality of Loboc (Cebuano: Munisipalidad sa Loboc; Tagalog: Bayan ng Loboc), is a municipality in the province of Bohol, Philippines. According to the 2024 census, it has a population of 17,338 people.

Located 28 kilometres (17 mi) east of Tagbilaran, Loboc is widely known for its lunch cruises along the scenic and winding Loboc River. The Loboc Children's Choir, who perform in different floating stations located at the river's end, has won numerous competitions both domestic and international. Tourists also visit to see the tarsier, a small, nocturnal, monkey-like mammal with large, red eyes. It is one of the world's smallest primates.

Until the 2013 earthquake, portions of the Loboc Church complex (specifically parts of what became the convent or priests' residence) were amongst the oldest standing religious structures in the island of Bohol. The earthquake also damaged the lunch cruise's Docking Port, and caused damage to the pedestrian river bridge and its passenger elevator. (Note: Here was one of the biggest blunders in planning in Bohol: a partly completed bridge, which if it were completed would have required the church to be destroyed.)

In late 2014, Tropical storm Seniang passed directly over the Loboc river area. Although the winds were relatively weak, Seniang brought substantial rainfall. This caused the river to burst its banks in several places: the entire poblacion main plaza was flooded, including the town hall; many of the lunch cruise boats were damaged; and the accumulated debris of the church was disturbed and some washed away. It was fortunate that the new replacement bridge across the river had been completed just a few weeks before, allowing traffic to reach Tagbilaran via Sikatuna since the Loay interior road was damaged and impassable.

The Loboc Church is currently in the tentative list for UNESCO World Heritage Sites under the Baroque Churches of the Philippines (Extension). A proposal has been suggested by scholars to make a separate UNESCO inclusion for the Old Centre of Loboc which includes the Loboc Church. The same would be made for other churches listed in UNESCO's tentative sites, where each town plaza and surrounding heritage buildings would be added. At present, government agencies are still yet to take action on the proposal.

== History ==
Since pre-Hispanic times, Loboc has always been an inland market village where produce from the sea was bartered for the agricultural goods of the upland regions. It is said to be the domain of Sigala, another chief of Bohol, whose contemporary, Sikatuna, made the famous Blood Compact with Miguel López de Legazpi in 1565.

In 1596, the Jesuit priest Fr. Juan de Torres, SJ came to Loboc from Baclayon to found the second Christian settlement on the island. After the traumatic Moro raid on Baclayon on 26 October 1600, the Jesuit missionaries decided to move the center of their missionary activities to the inland village of Loboc. By 1602, Loboc became a parish, making it the oldest on the island. To the Jesuits, Loboc was the "Residencia Boholana", where their local superior resided. It remained so until the middle of the 18th century when the exigencies of the times forced to them to move once more to Baclayon.

Around 1604, the Jesuits established a "Seminario-Colegio" or boarding school for native boys. This school laid the foundation of the musical culture of the town. Today the name Loboc is synonymous with musical acumen.

In June 1942, troops of the Imperial Japanese Army occupied Loboc. In 1945, Loboc was gradually liberated by the Philippine Commonwealth Army troops of the 8th and 83rd Infantry Division, together with Boholano guerrillas, forming part of the conclusion of World War II.

== Places of interest ==
=== Loboc Church ===
The Loboc Church is one of the most beautiful in the entire province. The first stone church was built in 1602. It was destroyed by fire in 1638 and its replacement built beside the site of the older one. This is the church presently standing, a fine example of the Jesuit colonial architecture of the 18th century.

After the expulsion of the Jesuits in 1768, the Augustinian Recollects took over and renovated the unfinished structure. They were responsible for the free-standing bell tower, the arcade façade, the mortuary chapel, the heavy stone buttresses and the unique three-storey convent built into the fabric of the Jesuit-built 17th century church.

Two individuals associated with sanctity lived and were buried at the Loboc church. One was Fr. Alonso Humanes, SJ, whose grave became a site of pilgrimage following his death in 1633. The other was Miguel Ayatumo, a native youth and student of the Seminario Colegio, who died at the age of 16 in 1609 and was regarded as having lived a life of holiness. Contemporary Jesuit accounts described Ayatumo as a second "Aloysius Gonzaga" from Bohol, reflecting the esteem in which he was held.

The Loboc Church contains a lot of interesting treasures. Among these are the decorative stone carvings and friezes on the exterior walls; a relief of St. Ignatius Loyola in polychrome stucco hidden behind the main altar, seven ancient retablos from both the Jesuit and Recollect periods; ceiling murals executed in the 1920s by Cebuano artists Ray Francia and Canuto Avila, one depicting the miracle of Our Lady of Guadalupe, the town's secondary patron, during the great flood of 1876; carved wooden cornices and decorative corbels shaped as gargoyles or mythical animals.

Much of the early history of Bohol was made around the town and church of Loboc. It would not be an understatement to say that to know Loboc is to understand the entire drama of Bohol history. At present, Loboc church is deteriorating, ignored by tourists and visitors and continually threatened by the annual flood that has already robbed it of its ancient records and other priceless relics. The church was severely damaged by the 2013 Bohol earthquake, and the tropical storm Seniang at the end of 2014 washed away most of the remains waiting for repair. The church then underwent a restoration spearheaded by the National Museum of the Philippines, eventually reopening in May of 2021.

== Geography ==
=== Barangays ===
Loboc is politically subdivided into 28 barangays. Each barangay consists of puroks and some have sitios.

PSGC	Barangay	Population			±% p.a.	
		2024		2010		
071229001	Agape	3.3%	579	660	▾	−0.91%
071229002	Alegria	3.4%	586	571	▴	0.18%
071229003	Bagumbayan	3.5%	610	684	▾	−0.79%
071229004	Bahian	2.9%	503	519	▾	−0.22%
071229005	Bonbon Lower	1.4%	235	218	▴	0.52%
071229006	Bonbon Upper	3.6%	631	584	▴	0.54%
071229007	Buenavista	1.9%	334	280	▴	1.23%
071229008	Bugho	3.3%	565	572	▾	−0.09%
071229009	Cabadiangan	1.5%	260	276	▾	−0.41%
071229010	Calunasan Norte	3.9%	674	631	▴	0.46%
071229011	Calunasan Sur	2.3%	392	406	▾	−0.24%
071229012	Camayaan	5.8%	1,011	1,039	▾	−0.19%
071229013	Cambance	1.8%	307	346	▾	−0.83%
071229014	Candabong	4.2%	728	736	▾	−0.08%
071229015	Candasag	1.2%	211	254	▾	−1.28%
071229016	Canlasid	1.7%	295	250	▴	1.16%
071229017	Gon‑ob	1.6%	271	285	▾	−0.35%
071229018	Gotozon	5.0%	870	771	▴	0.84%
071229019	Jimilian	6.7%	1,170	1,211	▾	−0.24%
071229020	Oy	7.5%	1,302	1,387	▾	−0.44%
071229022	Poblacion Ondol	4.6%	796	802	▾	−0.05%
071229021	Poblacion Sawang	3.4%	598	671	▾	−0.80%
071229023	Quinoguitan	2.9%	502	488	▴	0.20%
071229024	Taytay	1.4%	245	259	▾	−0.39%
071229025	Tigbao	4.8%	826	867	▾	−0.34%
071229026	Ugpong	1.9%	335	332	▴	0.06%
071229027	Villadolid	2.6%	445	478	▾	−0.50%
071229028	Villaflor	4.1%	712	735	▾	−0.22%
	Total		17,338	16,312	▴	0.43%

=== Climate ===
Climate data for Loboc, Bohol
Month	Jan	Feb	Mar	Apr	May	Jun	Jul	Aug	Sep	Oct	Nov	Dec	Year
Mean daily maximum °C (°F)	28 (82)	29 (84)	30 (86)	31 (88)	31 (88)	30 (86)	29 (84)	30 (86)	30 (86)	29 (84)	28 (82)	28 (82)	29 (85)
Mean daily minimum °C (°F)	22 (72)	22 (72)	22 (72)	23 (73)	24 (75)	24 (75)	24 (75)	24 (75)	24 (75)	24 (75)	23 (73)	23 (73)	23 (74)
Average precipitation mm (inches)	102 (4.0)	85 (3.3)	91 (3.6)	75 (3.0)	110 (4.3)	141 (5.6)	121 (4.8)	107 (4.2)	111 (4.4)	144 (5.7)	169 (6.7)	139 (5.5)	1,395 (55.1)
Average rainy days	18.6	14.8	16.5	16.7	23.9	26.4	25.6	24.1	24.4	26.3	23.7	20.5	261.5
Source: Meteoblue

== Demographics ==
Population census of Loboc
Year	Pop.	±% p.a.
1903	10,756	—
1918	11,335	+0.35%
1939	11,015	−0.14%
1948	11,201	+0.19%
1960	10,367	−0.64%
1970	11,767	+1.27%
1975	11,799	+0.05%
1980	11,778	−0.04%
1990	13,716	+1.54%
1995	13,335	−0.53%
2000	15,734	+3.61%
2007	16,299	+0.49%
2010	16,312	+0.03%
2015	15,993	−0.38%
2020	17,418	+1.81%
2024	17,338	−0.11%
Source: Philippine Statistics Authority

== Economy ==
Poverty incidence of Loboc

Source: Philippine Statistics Authority

== Gallery ==
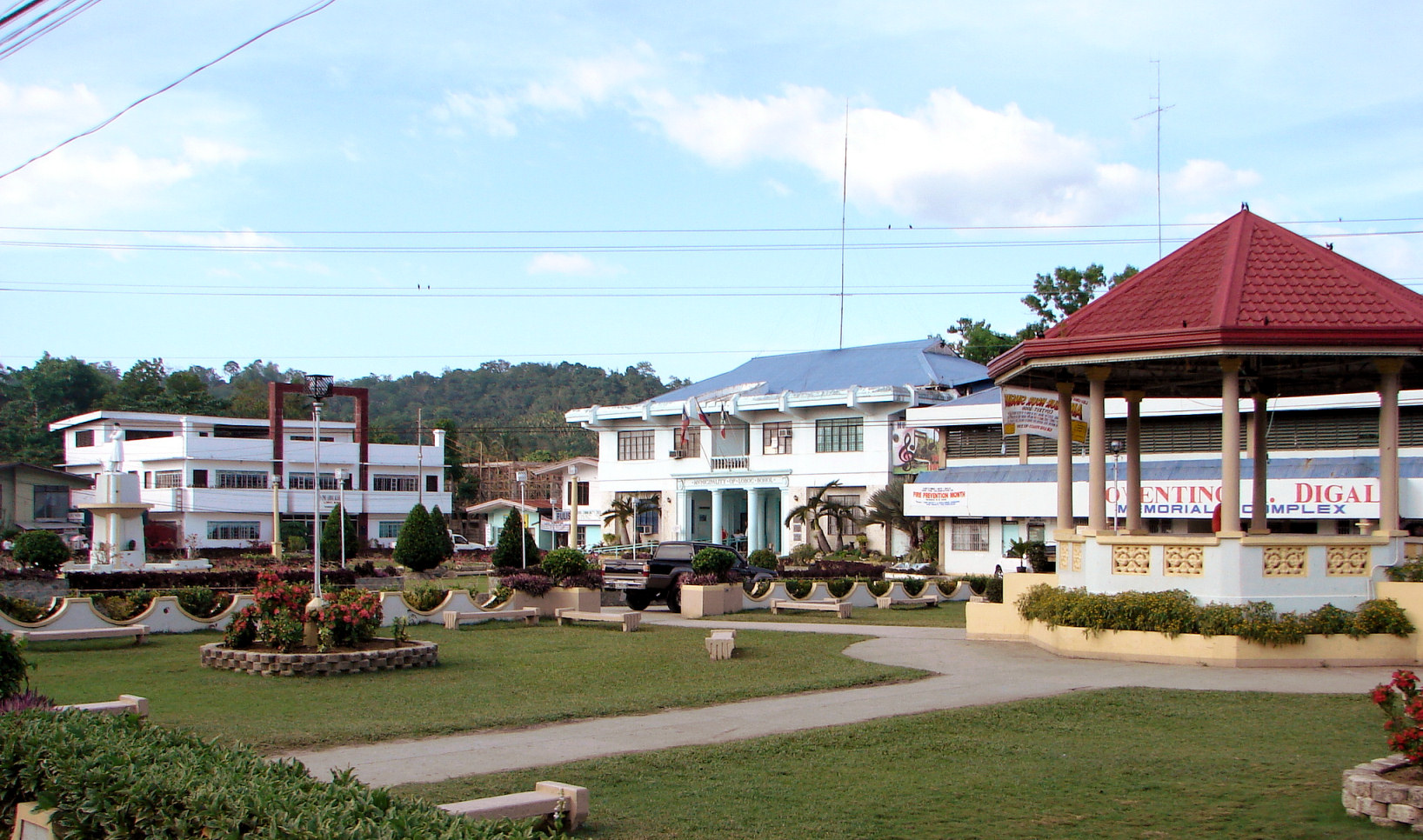
Poblacion and municipal hall in 2009

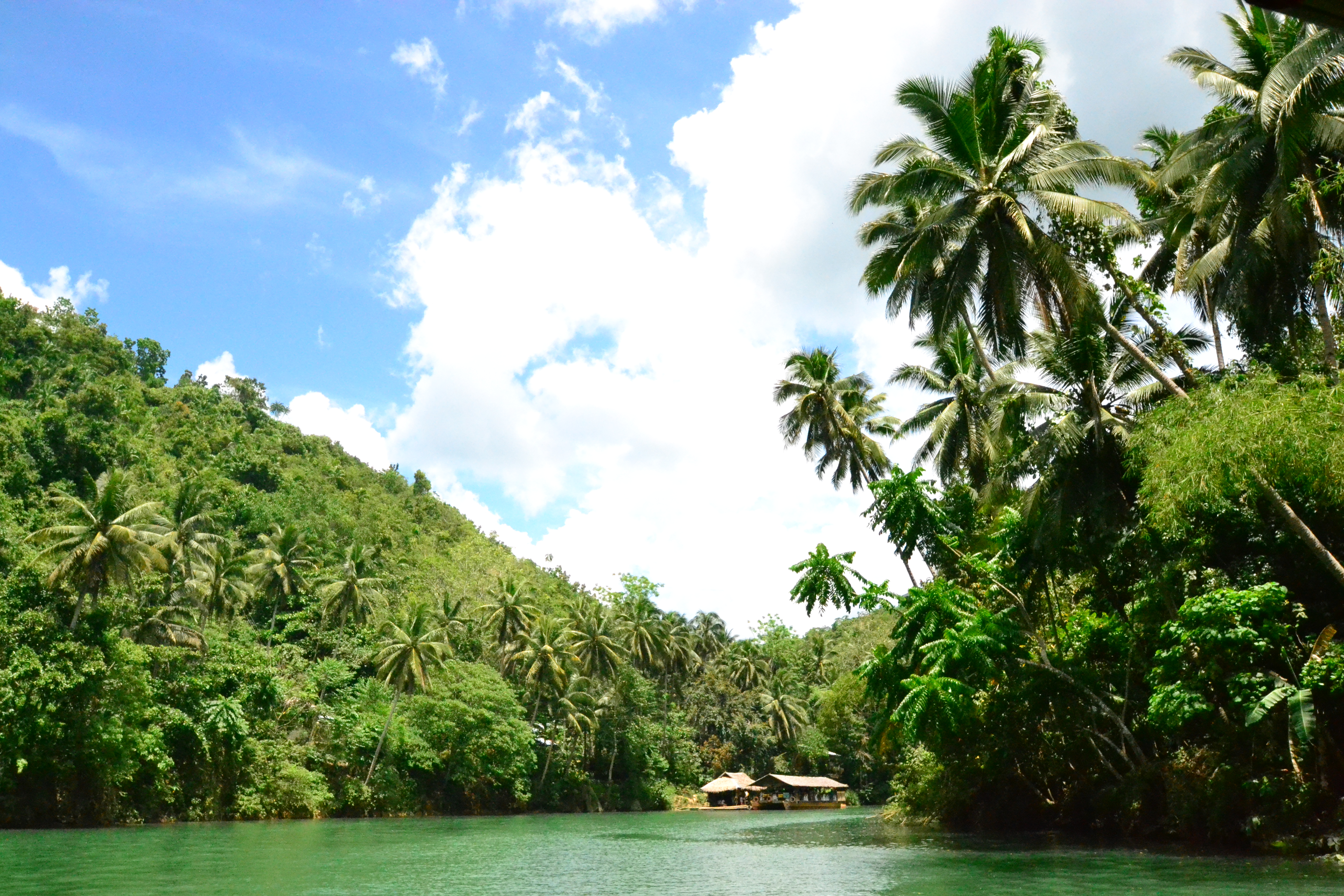
A view of Loboc River

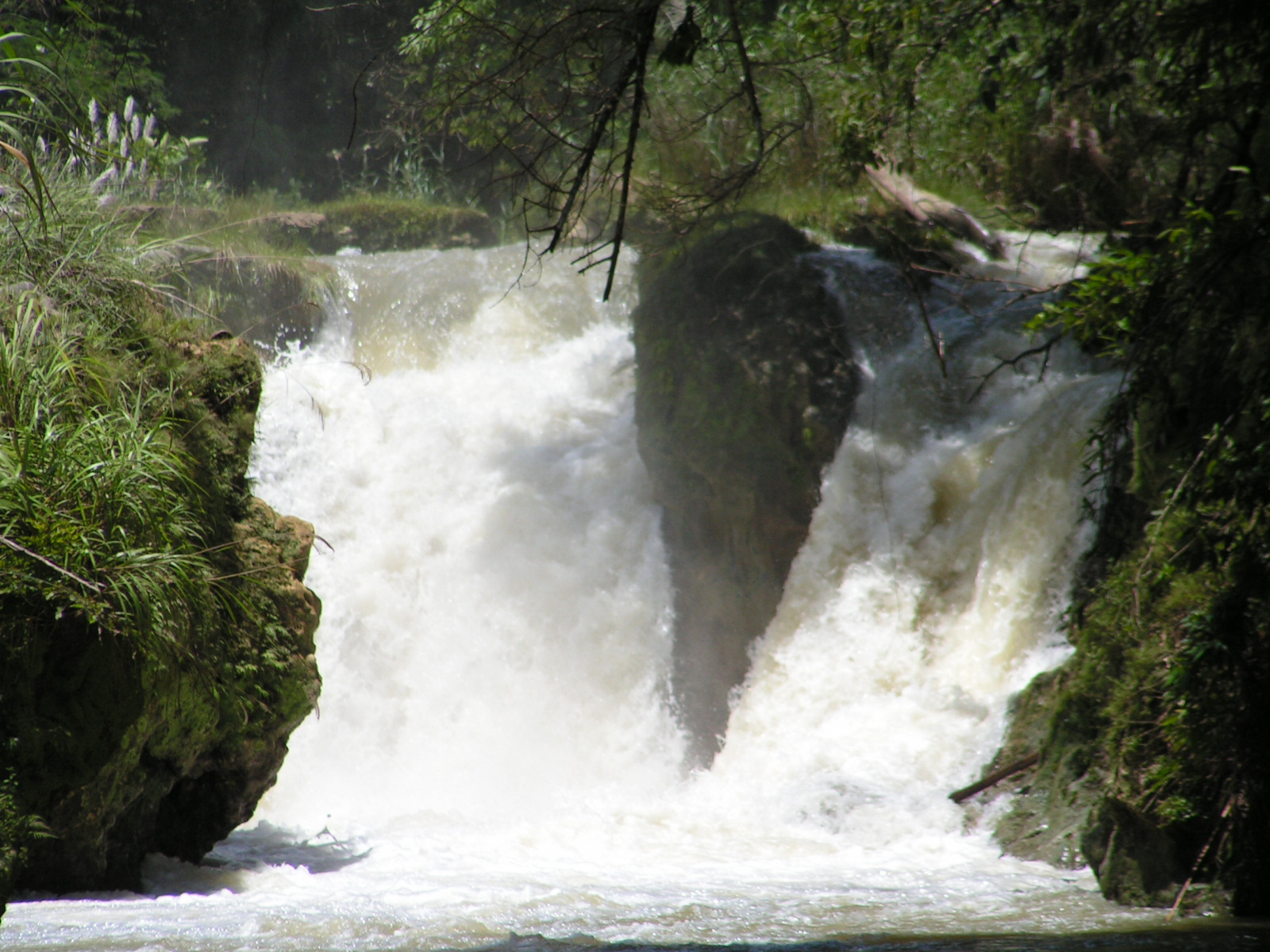
Busay Falls on Loboc river

Loboc River Cruise

Loboc Church
