= Adam Jala =

Filipino politician

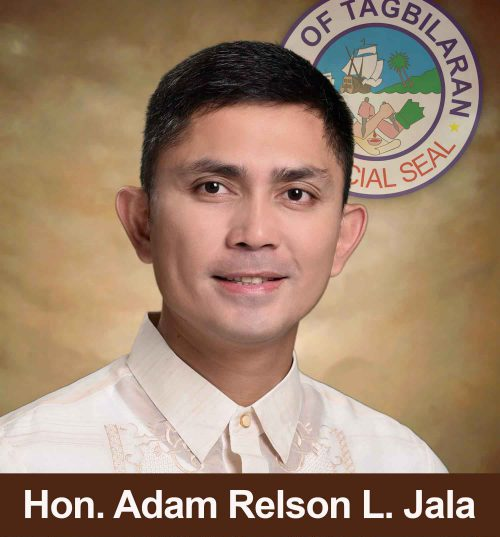

Vice Mayor of Tagbilaran
- Incumbent
- Assumed office June 30, 2022
- Mayor: Jane Yap
- Preceded by: Toto Veloso

City Councilor of Tagbilaran
- In office June 30, 2013 – June 30, 2022

Member of the Philippine House of Representatives from Bohol's 3rd District
- In office June 30, 2007 – June 30, 2010
- Preceded by: Eladio Jala
- Succeeded by: Art Yap

Personal details
- Born: Adam Relson Lagrada Jala; June 17, 1979 (age 46) Tagbilaran, Bohol, Philippines
- Party: Nacionalista (2024–present)
- Other political affiliations: NUP (2011–2015; 2018–2024); Liberal (2015–2018); Lakas (2006–2011)
- Spouse: Flora May Orapa
- Parents: Eladio Jala; Remedios Lagrada

Adam Relson Lagrada Jala (born 17 June 1979) is a Filipino lawyer and politician currently serving as the vice mayor of Tagbilaran City since June 30, 2022. Prior to that, he was a member of the Tagbilaran City council from 2013 to 2022 and a member of the House of Representatives of the Philippines representing the Bohol's 3rd congressional district from 2007 to 2010. He succeeded his father Eladio in the congressional seat.

Jala graduated from University of the Philippines Diliman with a degree in community development. He earned his law degree from Ateneo de Manila University.

== Controversy ==
Jala introduced the Small Town Lottery in Bohol which met opposition by the Catholic Church and some religious orders in Bohol.

House of Representatives of the Philippines
Preceded by Eladio M. Jala	Representative, 3rd District of Bohol; 2007–2010	Succeeded by Arthur C. Yap
