= Chocolate Hills resort controversy =

2024 controversy in Bohol, Philippines

A controversy arose in March 2024 when a resort built in the middle of the Chocolate Hills in Bohol, Philippines, came to wider public attention. The geological formations are a protected area.

Members of both chambers of Congress have questioned how the resort was allowed to be built between the hills despite its heritage and protected area status.

== Background ==
=== Chocolate Hills ===
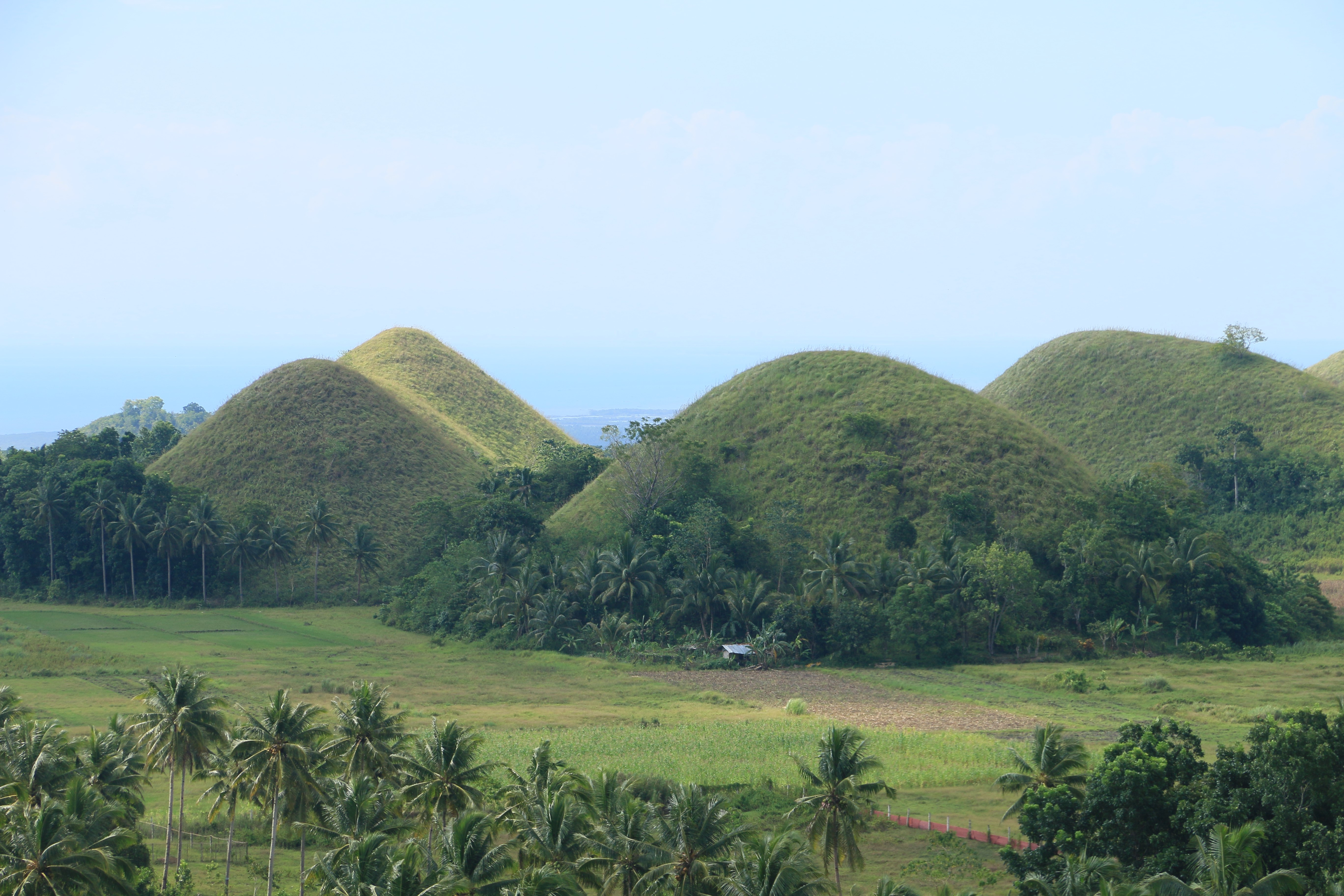
The hills in Sagbayan.

The Chocolate Hills are 1,776 near-identical conical hills or kegelkarsts which straddles across multiple municipalities in the island province of Bohol; Batuan, Bilar, Carmen, Sagbayan, Sierra Bullones and Valencia. It is a major tourist attraction of the province.

The hills have multiple designations. UNESCO named the hills as a National Geological Monument in 1988. In 1997, President Fidel V. Ramos named the hills a National Geological Monument and a Protected Landscape. The hills are a significant feature in the declaration of the whole Bohol island as the Philippines' first UNESCO Global Geopark in 2023.

Despite the 1997 declaration, private owners of land in the Chocolate Hills are still recognized although their usage of land is restricted and regulated.

=== Resort ===
Captain's Peak Garden and Resort
- Owner: Edgar Buton
- Opened: 2019
- Closed: March 14, 2024

The resort which is subject to controversy was Captain's Peak Garden and Resort in the barangay of Libertad Norte in Sagbayan.

The property associated with the resort was first listed in Bohol's Register of Deeds on August 28, 1996 – a year prior to the Ramos declaration. The land was acquired by the resort owners in 2005. Captain's Peak started operations in 2019.

Prior to the controversy which started in March 2024, the DENR already issued a temporary closure on the resort in September 2023. The resort continued operating. On January 22, 2024 the DENR has issued a violation notice due to the resort operating without an Environmental Compliance Certificate (ECC).

== Events ==
=== Vlog coverage ===
The controversy arose after vlogger and social media content creator Ren The Adventurer featured Captain's Peak Garden and Resort in his video. The video is a review of the resort and was published on Facebook on March 6, 2024. It featured aerial shots of the resort in between three of the Chocolate Hills. Resort owner Edgar Buton thanked Ren for the coverage but the resort would receive significant negative reception.

=== Closure of the resort ===
On March 14, 2024, Captain's Peak ceased operations after its business permit was revoked by the Sagbayan local government.

=== Congressional inquiries ===
The resort has been subject of inquiries in the Senate and the House of Representatives. The liability of the Department of Natural Resources as member of the Protected Area Management Board and local officials was questioned.

ACT-CIS Partylist Representative Erwin Tulfo compared the resort to an eyesore and a "wart" and noticed that there are two other resorts built on the Chocolate Hills.

=== Actions by the local government ===
A task force was formed by the Department of the Interior and Local Government (DILG) on March 18 to recommend charges before the Office of the Ombudsman. The local government led by Bohol Governor Erico Aristotle Aumentado, Sagbayan Mayor Suarez, and 2nd District Representative Vanessa Aumentado met to investigate the culpability and it was agreed that "Captain’s Peak should remain closed while the issue was not yet resolved."

=== Suspension of government officials ===
On May 28, 2024, the Ombudsman imposed a six-month preventive suspension on Bohol Governor Erico Aristotle Aumentado and 68 other officials in the province, including the mayors of eight municipalities (Sagbayan, Batuan, Catigbian, Clarin, Bilar, Sierra Bullones, Valencia, and Carmen) as part of its investigation into illegal construction within the Chocolate Hills.

== See also ==
- Torre de Manila – skyscraper controversial for being built on the sight-line behind the Rizal Monument
