= Chocolate Hills =

Geological formation in Bohol, Philippines

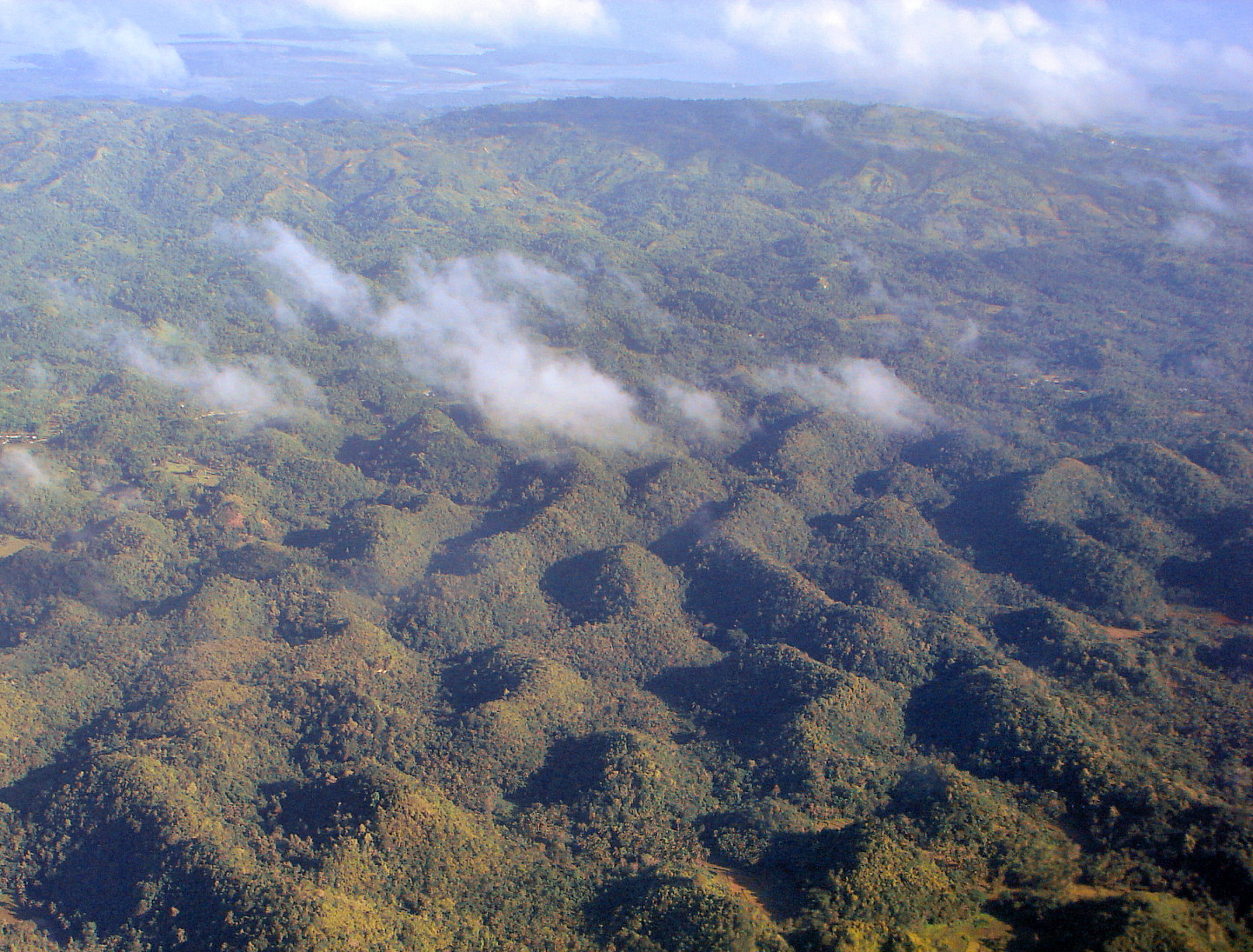
- Aerial view of the Chocolate Hills

Highest point
- Elevation: 120 m (390 ft)
- Coordinates: 9°55′N 124°10′E

Naming
- Native name: Mga Bungtod sa Tsokolate (Cebuano)

Geography
- Location within Visayas Location within Philippines
- Settlements: Sagbayan; Batuan; Carmen; Bilar; Sierra Bullones; Valencia

Geology
- Rock age: Late Pliocene to Early Pleistocene
- Mountain type: Range of karst conical hills

The Chocolate Hills (Cebuano: Mga Bungtod sa Tsokolate, Filipino: Mga Tsokolateng Burol, or Mga Burol na Tsokolate) are a geological formation in the Philippine province of Bohol. A minimum of 1,260 hills, and possibly over 1,776, spread over an area of more than 50 square kilometers (20 sq mi). They are covered in green grass that turns a chocolate-brown during the dry season, hence the name.

The Chocolate Hills are featured on the provincial flag and seal to symbolize the abundance of natural attractions in the province. The site is on the Philippine Tourism Authority's list of tourist destinations in the Philippines, and it has been declared the country's third national geological monument, as well as being proposed for inclusion in UNESCO's World Heritage List.

== Description ==
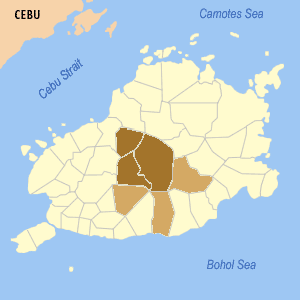
Locator map of the Chocolate Hills. The greatest concentrations of hills (dark brown) are in Sagbayan, Batuan, and Carmen, while lower concentrations (light brown) are in Bilar, Sierra Bullones, and Valencia.

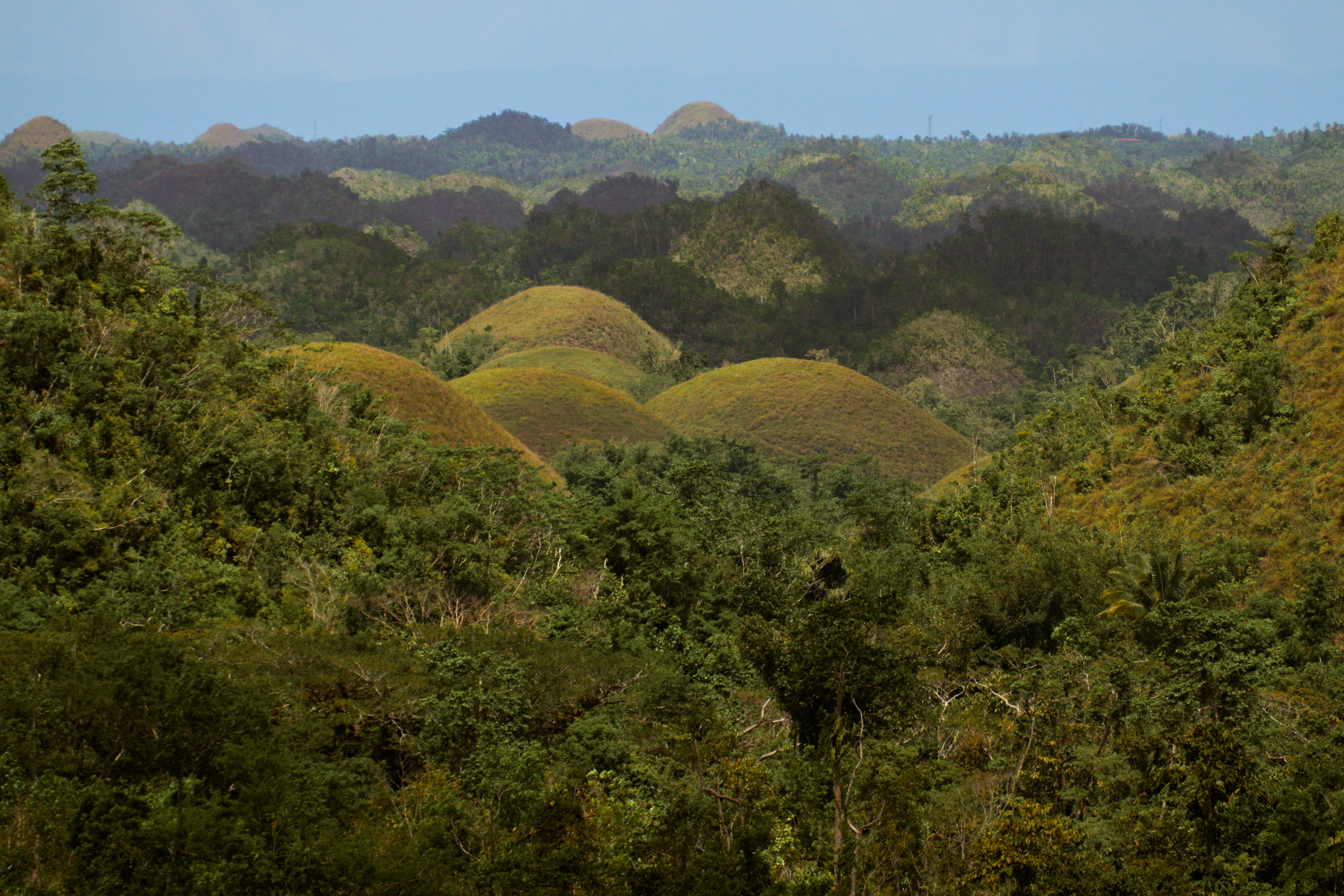
Chocolate Hills, viewed from a distance across tropical forest

The Chocolate Hills form a rolling terrain of haycock-shaped hills—mounds of a generally conical and almost symmetrical shape. With an estimated 1,268 to 1,776 individual mounds, these dome-shaped hills are actually made of grass-covered limestone. The domes vary in size from 30 to 50 meters (98 to 164 ft) high, with the largest being 120 meters (390 ft) in height. One of Bohol's best-known tourist attractions, these unique hills are scattered by the hundreds throughout the towns of Carmen, Batuan, and Sagbayan.

=== Vegetation ===
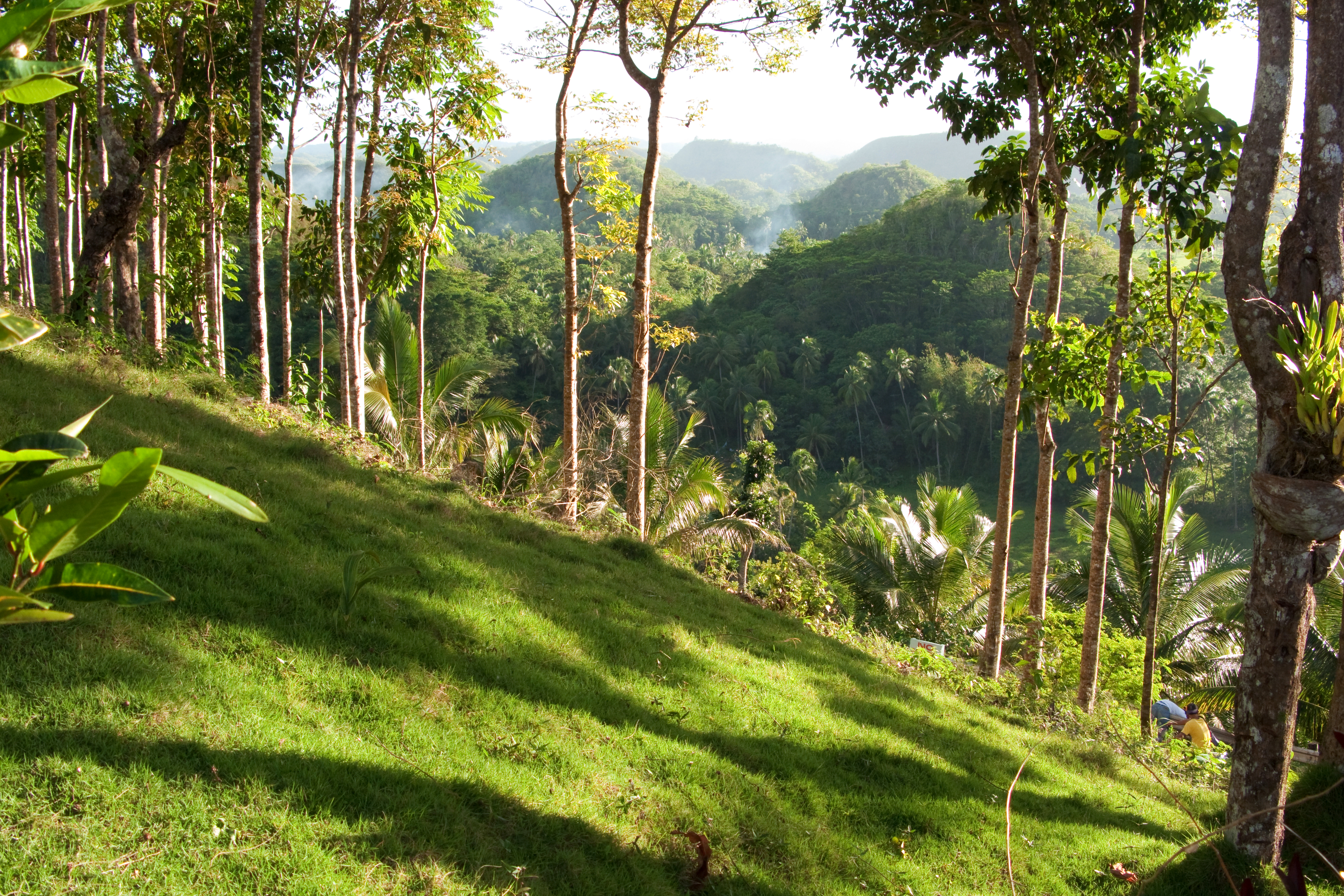
Vegetation on the hills

During the dry season, the grass-covered hills dry up and turn chocolate-brown. The vegetation is dominated by grass species such as Imperata cylindrica and Saccharum spontaneum. Several Asteraceae and ferns also grow on them. In between the hills, the flatlands are cultivated with rice and other cash crops. However, the natural vegetation on the Chocolate Hills is threatened by quarrying activities.

=== Origin ===
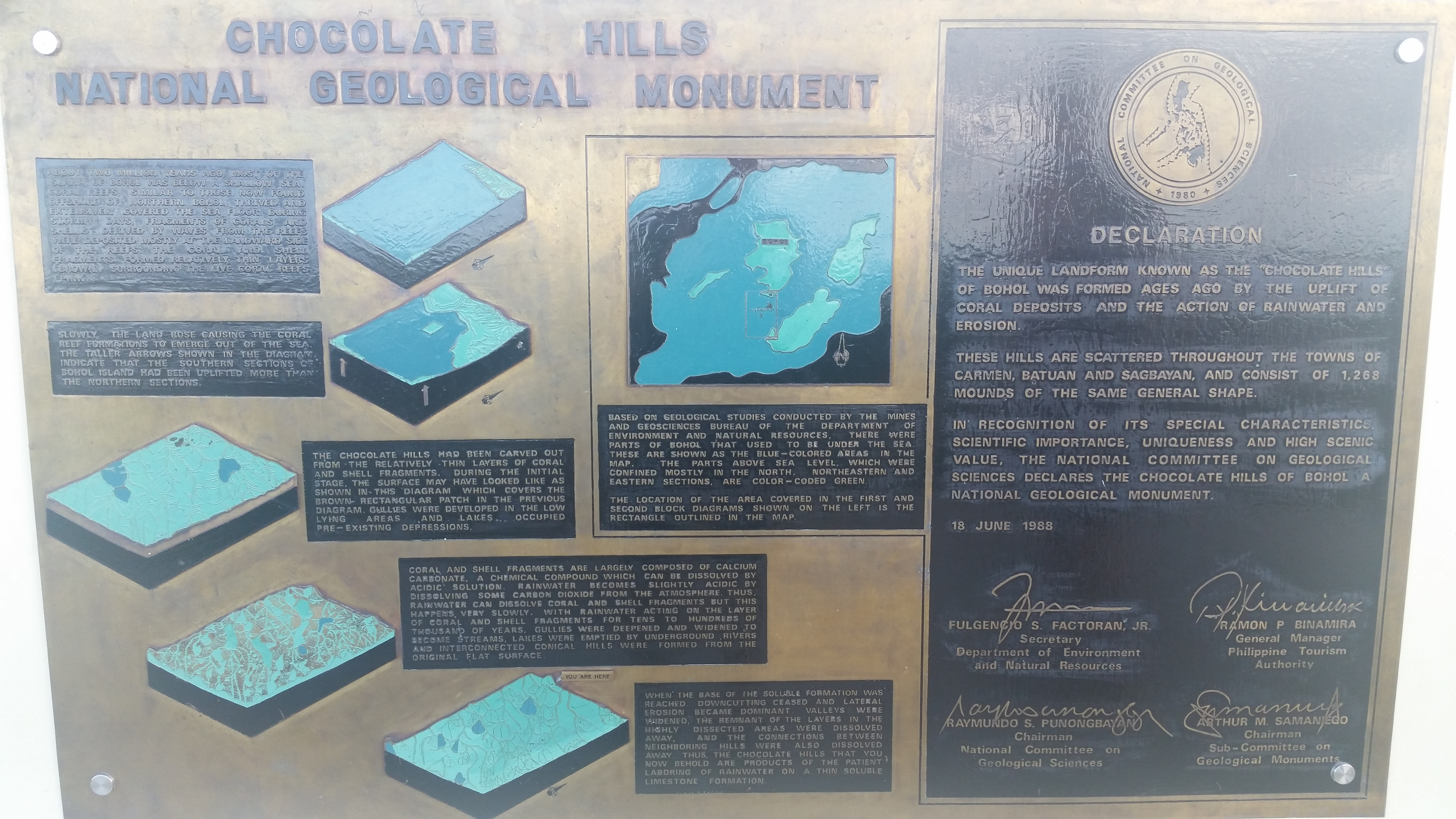
Historical marker explaining the geologic evolution of the area

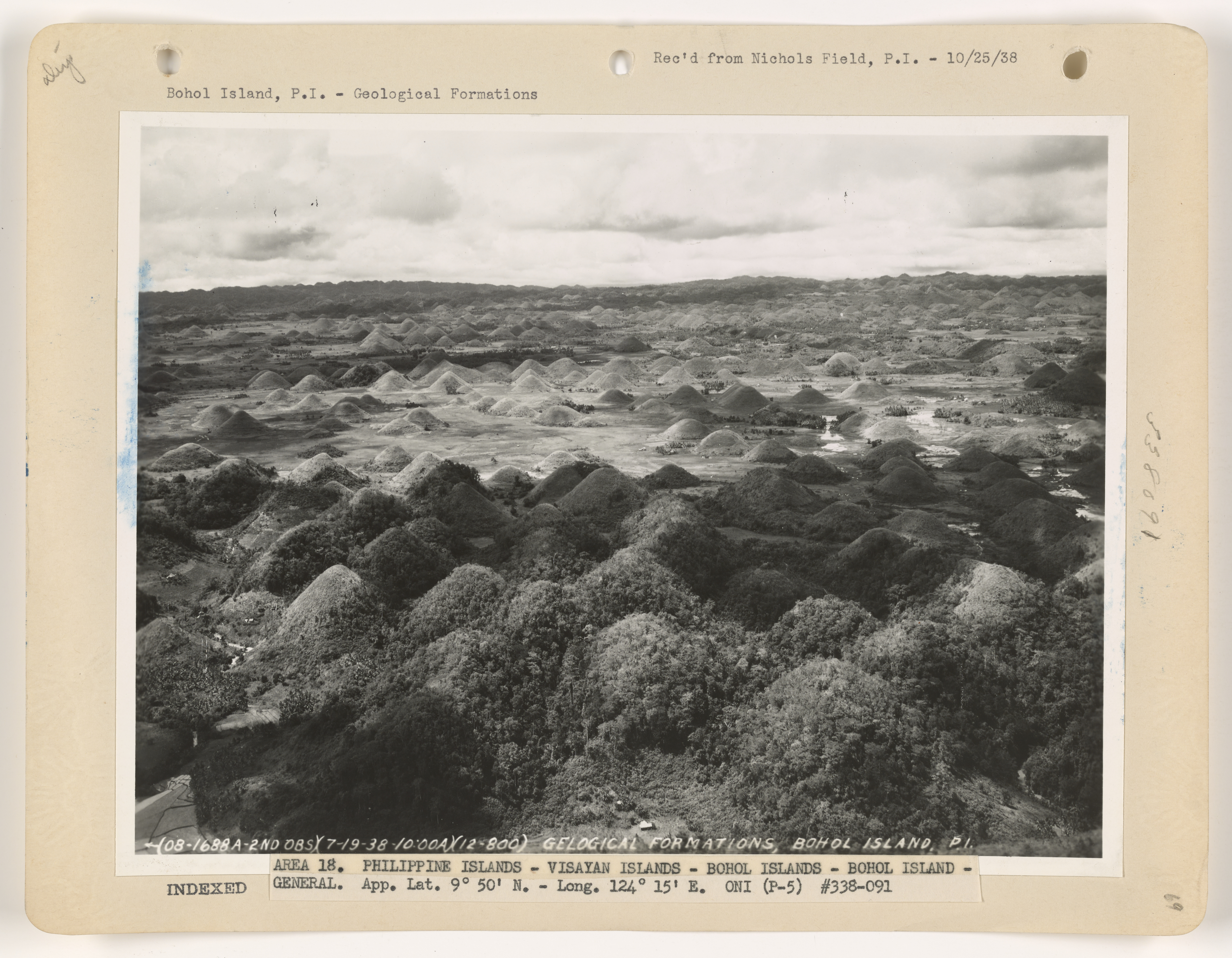
Chocolate Hills, 1938

The Chocolate Hills are conical karst that consist of Late Pliocene to Early Pleistocene, thin to medium-bedded, sandy to rubbly marine limestone. They contain abundant fossils of shallow marine foraminifera, coral, mollusks, and algae. These conical hills are geomorphological features called cockpit karst, which were created by a combination of the dissolution of limestone by rainfall, surface water, and groundwater, and their subaerial erosion by streams after they had been uplifted above sea level and fractured by tectonic processes. The hills are separated by flat plains and contain numerous caves and springs.

The origin of the conical karst of the Chocolate Hills is described on the bronze plaque at the viewing deck in Carmen. This plaque states that they are eroded formations of a type of marine limestone that sits on top of hardened clay.

A variety of fanciful and less credible explanations about how these hills formed persist, despite extensive scientific documentation. These theories include sub-oceanic volcanism, limestone-covered blocks created by the destruction of an active volcano in a cataclysmic eruption, and tidal movements. The lack of any exposed or associated volcanic rocks in the Chocolate Hills refutes the popular theories involving volcanic eruptions. The theories involving either a sudden, massive geologic shift, coral reefs being erupted from the sea, or tidal movements lack any corroborating evidence or support among geologists.

== Tourism ==
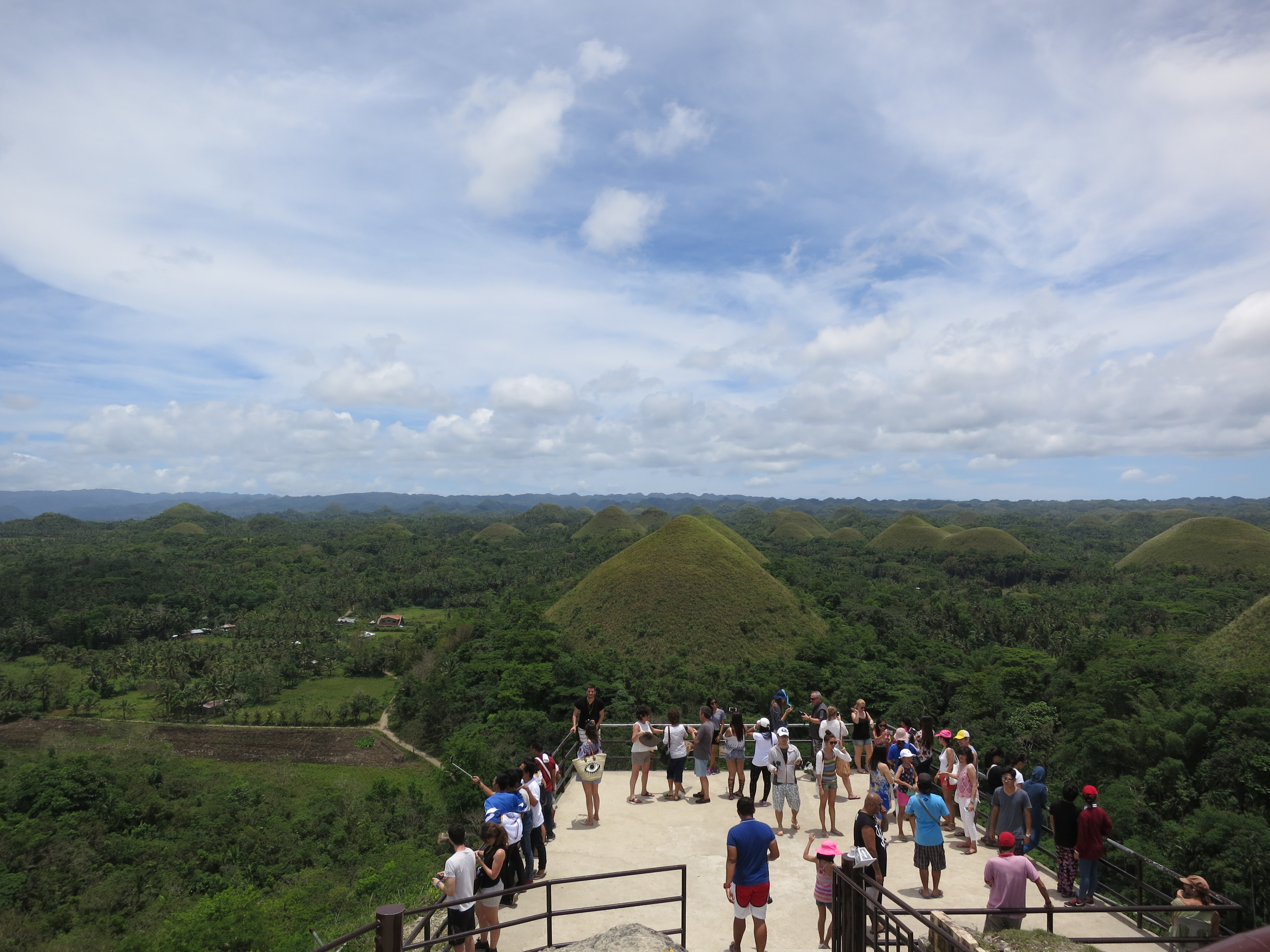
Tourists at the Carmen viewing deck

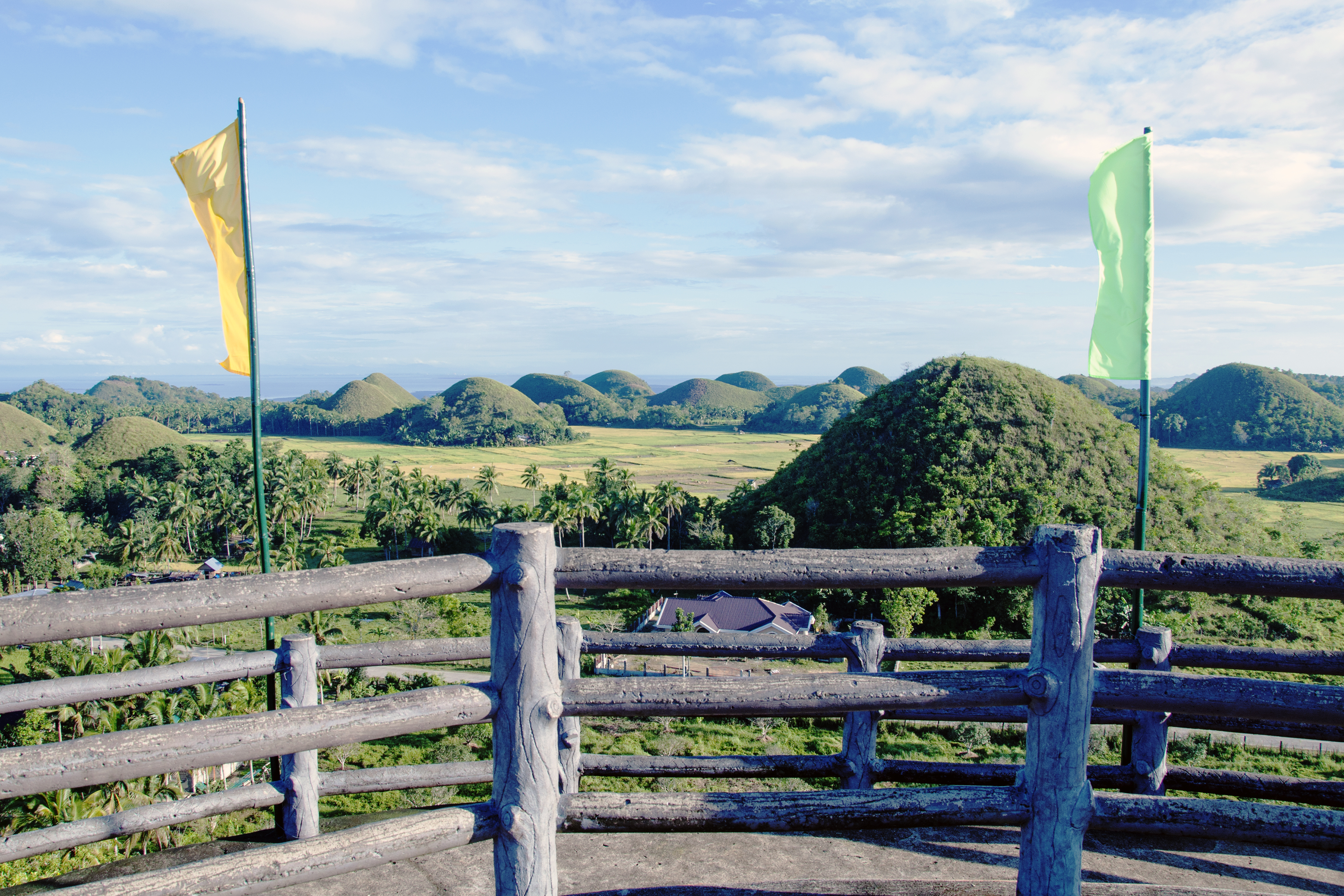
Chocolate Hills viewed from Sagbayan Peak

Two of the hills have been developed into tourist resorts. The main viewing point of the Chocolate Hills is the government-owned Chocolate Hills Complex in Carmen, about 55 km (34 miles) from the capital of Tagbilaran. The other main point to view the Chocolate Hills is at Sagbayan Peak, in Sagbayan, 18 km (11 miles) away from the complex, also in Carmen.

== Protection ==
=== Legislation ===
The National Committee on Geological Sciences declared the Chocolate Hills of Bohol a National Geological Monument on June 18, 1988, in recognition of its special characteristics, scientific importance, uniqueness, and high scenic value. As such, this added the Chocolate Hills to the country's protected areas. More protection was provided by "Proclamation No. 1037", signed by President Fidel V. Ramos on July 1, 1997, which established the Chocolate Hills and the areas within, around, and surrounding them located in the municipalities of Carmen, Batuan, Sagbayan, Bilar, Valencia, and Sierra Bullones as a natural monument to protect and maintain its natural beauty and to provide restraining mechanisms for inappropriate exploitation. They are thus covered under the National Integrated Protected Areas System, with the Department of Environment and Natural Resources (DENR) as the lead implementing agency for its protection.

Land-use conflict prompted President Gloria Macapagal Arroyo to sign an amendment to "Proclamation 468" on September 26, 1994, declaring the land around or in between the Chocolate Hills as no longer part of the national monument during the Sandugo celebration on July 17, 2002. This amendment allowed the tracts of land surrounding and within the famous tourist spot to be developed by the provincial government and other entities that have control over the area. Further, the amended proclamation ensured that the areas that have to be preserved are preserved, while those that could be developed would be excluded from the national monument area and classified as alienable and disposable by the government. The president initially decided on the issue during the joint meeting of the Regional Development Council–Regional Peace and Order Council of Region VII, which was conducted at the Bohol Tropics Resort.

Bills have been filed aiming to strengthen protection of the hills. On July 6, 2004, the Philippine House of Representatives introduced "House Bill No. 01147", subtitled "an act declaring the Chocolate Hills as national patrimony and geological monuments, penalizing their plunder, destruction or defacement, and for other purposes". The bill was authored by Congressman Eladio "Boy" Jala and co-authored by congressmen Roilo Golez and Edgar Chatto. The bill has not been passed into law.

On May 16, 2006, the DENR submitted the Chocolate Hills to UNESCO for inclusion as a World Heritage Site on the list of natural monuments, because of its outstanding universal value.

The Chocolate Hills was declared a national park under "Republic Act No. 11038 (Expanded National Integrated Protected Areas System Act of 2018)", signed by President Rodrigo Duterte in July 2018.

=== Issues ===
Balancing protection, resource utilization, and tourism are the challenges faced by the Chocolate Hills. Before they were designated national geological monuments, some of the hills (about 310,455 ha (1,200 sq miles)) were classified as alienable and disposable or as private lands, such that they were titled to local residents. The declaration consequently caused some social unrest, resulting in almost simultaneous civil uprising, led by the New People's Army (generally described as Maoist guerrillas) establishing a new front, known as the Chocolate Hills Command. To some farmers, the proclamation is a government scheme that suppresses their right to own lands. As such, conflicts between the New People's Army group and government military forces escalated, culminating in two major engagements.

Being alienable and disposable lands, the Chocolate Hills are seen as quarrying assets and a source of income for small-scale miners as well as quarry materials for the province's construction projects. The challenge has been how national and local officials can harmonize the current needs of small-scale miners, the construction sector, and the tourism industry with the preservation of the Chocolate Hills. Even with their protected status, mining permits continue to be granted by DENR and local government units. Hence, mining and quarrying are still taking place. Because of this, the provincial government of Bohol has requested jurisdiction over the Chocolate Hills from the DENR. Meanwhile, the provincial government has suggested that the legislation defining the Natural Monument should be changed, which would require that the proclamation be redrafted and ratified by both the Philippine House and Senate. This is a cumbersome and costly process, on which no progress has been made to date. Future development and investment challenges within the Chocolate Hills area include: obtaining the national government's sanction for the project; persuading landowners to sell; convincing the Protected Areas Management Board, which has jurisdiction over the hills, not to use its veto power over any investment requiring physical facilities.

A resort was built between the Chocolate Hills, sparking controversy in March 2024. In response, Congress launched inquiries, which led to the resort being built despite the hills' protected status and a subsequent six-month suspension of 68 local officials, including Bohol governor Erico Aristotle Aumentado.

== Disasters ==
=== 2013 Bohol earthquake ===
One of the largest earthquakes to hit Bohol struck the island at 8:12 a.m. (PHT) on October 15, 2013. The center of the M7.2 earthquake was near Sagbayan, Bohol. Due to the earthquake, a portion of one of the hills gave way, and the Chocolate Hills' viewing deck was destroyed.

In October 2018, the Provincial Development Council's Executive Committee proposed ₱200 million in funding for the repair work and restored the viewing deck and surrounding facilities, including pathways, parking space, water features, trellis, stairs, ramps, food court, museum, activity center, lamp posts, signage, and landscaping.

=== Grass fires ===
On April 30, 2024, two of the hills were burned in a grass fire in Carmen after Bohol's heat index reached 41 °C (106 °F).

== Formation myths ==
The Chocolate Hills have inspired many geomyths, most of which revolve around their formation and figures of giants.

=== Battle between two giants ===
There were once two giants, dwelling in the northern and southern edges of the island, respectively. During a rainy day, when the ground became muddy, a hostile encounter between them prompted worried people to vacate to other parts of the island, and the giant from the north instigated a mud-throwing fight. After a while, the battle climaxed into a fistfight between the giants and ended with both knocking each other to the ground and dying. What was left of the thrown mud that landed on the ground became the hills.

=== Romance of Arogo and Aloya ===
A young and powerful giant named Arogo once fell in love with a human named Aloya, and they lived together for some time, until Aloya became ill and died. Arogo mourned, and his tears fell to the ground, forming mounds that would later become the hills.

=== Mud cakes ===
The flatlands of Carmen were once a playground for giant children. One day, they initiated a contest on who could bake the most mud cakes, gathering mud and "baking" them under coconut half-shells laid flat on the ground. Before the contest could end, however, the children were called home. After a while, they returned to the area to witness their finished creations and left them undisturbed out of admiration—the baked cakes thus became the hills.

== Karst hill ranges outside of Bohol ==
Outside of Bohol, similar karst hill ranges are found throughout the Philippines, such as in the interiors of Siquijor and Cebu, southeastern Leyte, along the western coast of Guimaras, the northwestern tip of Masbate, and in the Bicol region, comprising southern Albay and western Sorsogon.

== See also ==
- List of protected areas of the Philippines
- Kegelkarst
- Mogote
