= Sagbayan =

Municipality in Bohol, Philippines

Sagbayan Borja
- Municipality
- Municipality of Sagbayan
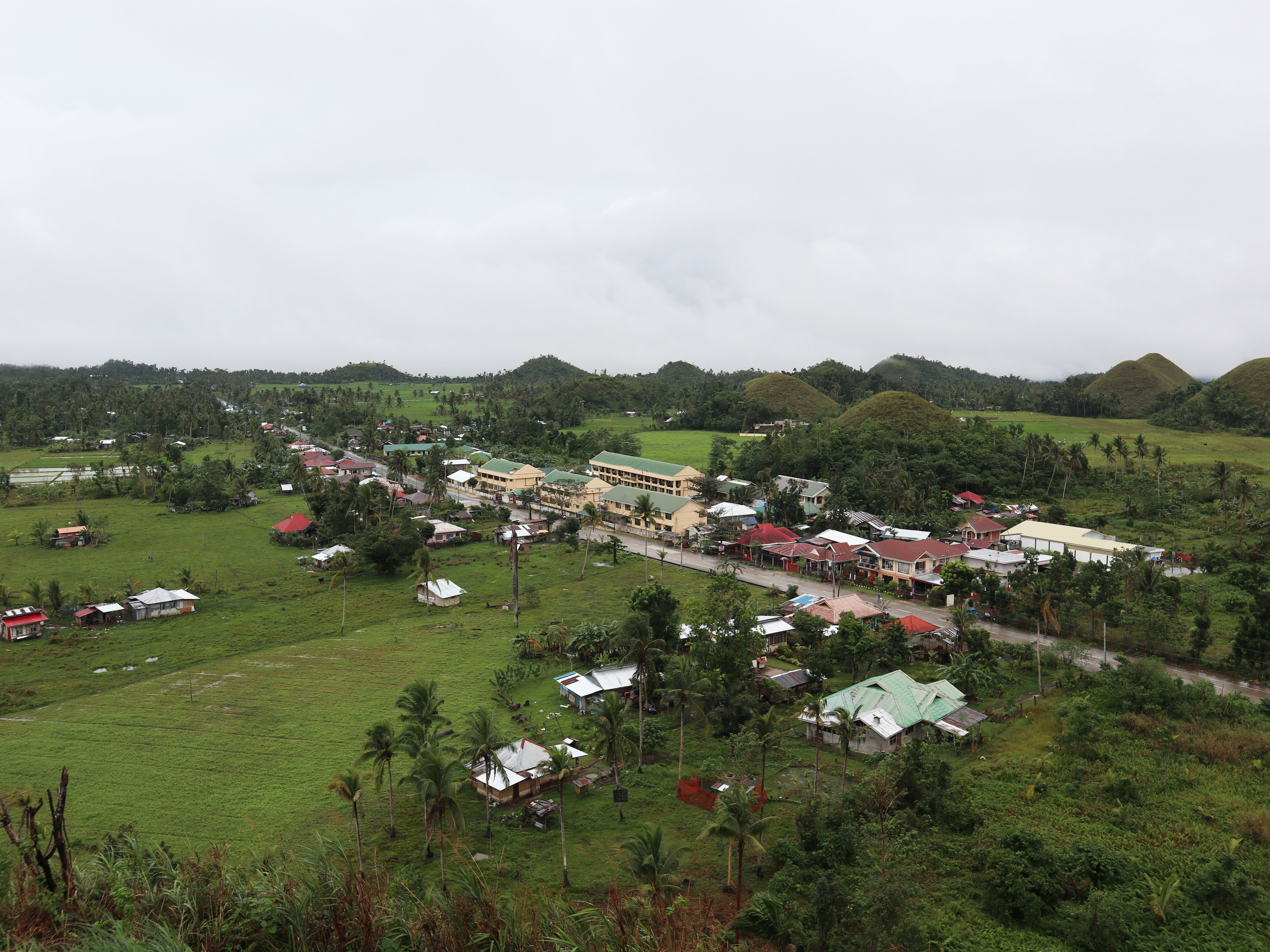
- San Agustin

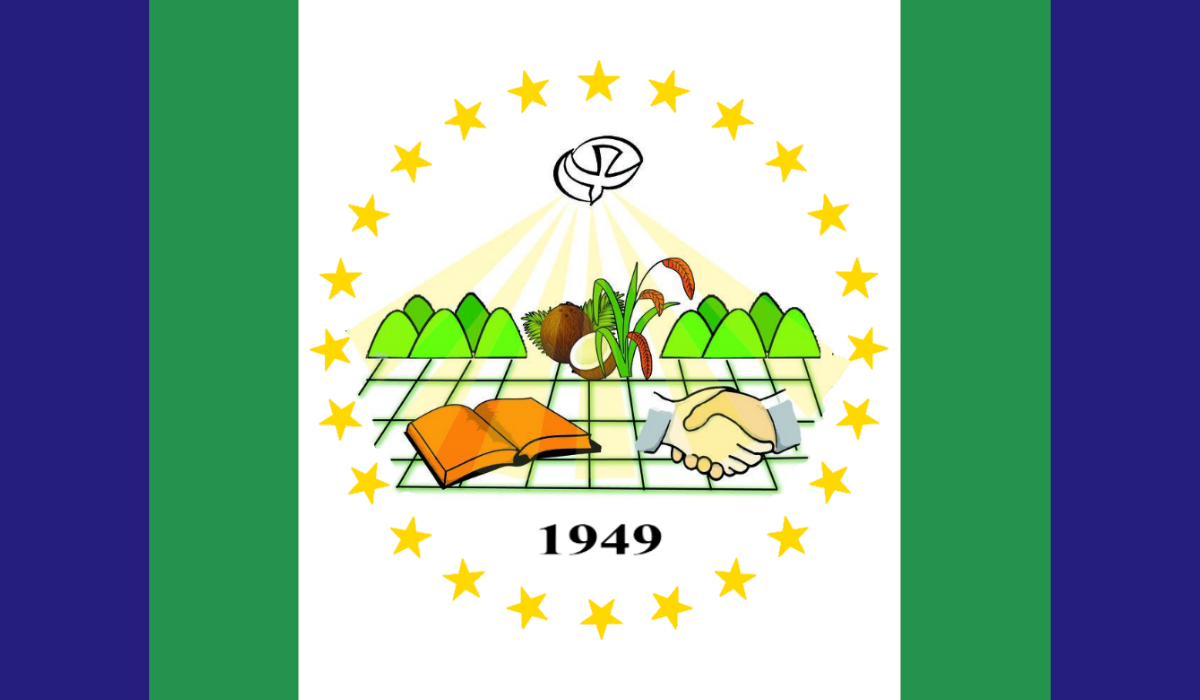
- Flag

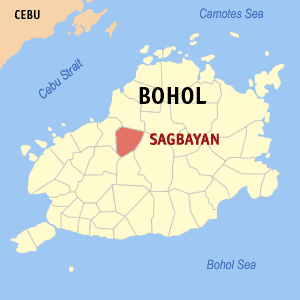
- Map of Bohol with Sagbayan highlighted
- Interactive map of Sagbayan
- Location within the Philippines
- Coordinates: 9°55′N 124°06′E
- Country: Philippines
- Region: Central Visayas
- Province: Bohol
- District: 2nd district
- Founded: February 9, 1949
- Renamed: June 21, 1957
- Barangays: 24 (see Barangays)

Government
  - Type: Sangguniang Bayan
  - Mayor: Restituto Q. Suarez III (suspended); Asuncion B. Ybañez (acting)
  - Vice Mayor: RR Fajardo
  - Representative: Ma. Vanessa C. Aumentado
  - Municipal Council: Members: Angelyn T. Camacho; Mark A. Fajardo; Ricardo L. Suarez; Rodino L. Tambacan; Hans B. Pojas; Roque C. Amores; Charito P. Lao; Richard P. Mier
  - Electorate: 17,494 voters (2025)

Area
  - Total: 69.61 km^{2} (26.88 sq mi)
- Elevation: 424 m (1,391 ft)
- Highest elevation: 327 m (1,073 ft)
- Lowest elevation: 47 m (154 ft)

Population (2024 census)
  - Total: 25,329
  - Density: 363.9/km^{2} (942.4/sq mi)
  - Households: 5,897

Economy
  - Income class: 3rd municipal income class
  - Poverty incidence: 18.64% (2023)
  - Revenue: ₱ 154.7 million (2024)
  - Assets: ₱ 376.4 million (2024)
  - Expenditure: ₱ 92.81 million (2024)
  - Liabilities: ₱ 49.26 million (2024)

Service provider
  - Electricity: Bohol 1 Electric Cooperative (BOHECO 1)
- Time zone: UTC+8 (PST)
- ZIP code: 6331
- PSGC: 071236000
- IDD : area code: +63 (0)38
- Native languages: Boholano dialect Cebuano; Tagalog

Sagbayan, officially the Municipality of Sagbayan (Cebuano: Munisipyo sa Sagbayan; Tagalog: Bayan ng Sagbayan), is a municipality in the province of Bohol, Philippines. According to the 2024 census, it has a population of 25,329 people.

Its main attraction is Sagbayan Peak, a tourism site overlooking a scenic valley with an observation platform and children's playground. While some similar hill formations are visible, it is not within the main Chocolate Hills area.

Sagbayan is 74 kilometres (46 mi) from Tagbilaran.

Sagbayan celebrates its feast on May 4/August 28, to honor the town patron San Agustin.

== Etymology ==
The name Sagbayan came from the combination of the local words Sag which means nest, and Bay (short of Balay) which means house. Therefore, Sagbayan means a place for making tree-houses.

Long ago, the place was said to be plentiful of deer and wild pig. People often visit the place to hunt them. They constructed tree houses while waiting for their prey to appear. As time goes, these animals were depopulated, leaving only tree houses left by the hunters.

The proper pronunciation of word Ságbayan has a stress on its first syllable, not Sagbayán, which has stress on its suffix -an, therefore debunking the word Sagbayán which means a place to hang.

== History ==
Sagbayan was formerly part of the surrounding municipalities of Clarin, Inabanga, Carmen, and Balilihan. It was created into a separate town through Executive Order No. 204 of President Elpidio Quirino on February 9, 1949, and named Borja, in honor of Salustiano Borja, the first elected civil governor of the province of Bohol.

The original list of its barangays and sitios were Sagbayan, Canmaya Centro, Canmaya Diot, Canmano, San Antonio, and San Isidro, and the sitios of Santa Cruz, San Vicente Norte, San Vicente Sur, San Ramon, and Kalangahan (Calangahan), from Clarin; the sitios of Mantalongon and Katipunan from Inabanga, and the sitios of Cabasacan (Kabasacan) and Ubuhan (Ubojan) from Balilihan (note: Catigbian wasstill part of Balilihan until its reorganization on June 17, 1949). Barangay Sagbayan became its Poblacion which is the seat of government of the municipality.

Through the Republic Act No. 1741, it was reverted to its original name, Sagbayan on June 21, 1957, signed by President Carlos P. Garcia.

On October 15, 2013, Sagbayan was close to the epicenter of a magnitude 7.2 earthquake. The town suffered 12 fatalities and damage to almost 1,000 homes, as well as total destruction of its town hall.

== Geography ==
=== Barangays ===
Sagbayan is politically subdivided into 24 barangays. Each barangay consists of puroks and some have sitios.

PSGC	Barangay	Population			±% p.a.	
		2024		2010		
071236001	Calangahan	3.8%	957	910	▴	0.35%
071236002	Canmano	7.9%	2,000	1,006	▴	4.90%
071236003	Canmaya Centro	5.7%	1,448	1,317	▴	0.66%
071236004	Canmaya Diot	4.8%	1,221	1,161	▴	0.35%
071236005	Dagnawan	3.3%	842	525	▴	3.35%
071236006	Kabasacan	2.1%	539	490	▴	0.67%
071236007	Kagawasan	1.5%	376	370	▴	0.11%
071236008	Katipunan	2.3%	591	600	▾	−0.11%
071236009	Langtad	2.1%	530	570	▾	−0.51%
071236010	Libertad Norte	1.4%	353	316	▴	0.77%
071236011	Libertad Sur	0.5%	117	184	▾	−3.10%
071236012	Mantalongon	3.8%	952	707	▴	2.09%
071236013	Poblacion	16.4%	4,154	3,945	▴	0.36%
071236014	Sagbayan Sur	4.6%	1,170	1,011	▴	1.02%
071236015	San Agustin	4.1%	1,037	867	▴	1.26%
071236016	San Antonio	3.8%	966	852	▴	0.88%
071236017	San Isidro	3.5%	882	736	▴	1.27%
071236018	San Ramon	2.2%	563	405	▴	2.32%
071236019	San Roque	1.7%	434	420	▴	0.23%
071236020	San Vicente Norte	3.1%	789	715	▴	0.69%
071236021	San Vicente Sur	1.2%	302	290	▴	0.28%
071236022	Santa Catalina	4.5%	1,136	721	▴	3.22%
071236023	Santa Cruz	3.6%	920	985	▾	−0.47%
071236024	Ubojan	4.4%	1,113	988	▴	0.83%
	Total		25,329	20,091	▴	1.63%

=== Climate ===
Climate data for Sagbayan, Bohol
Month	Jan	Feb	Mar	Apr	May	Jun	Jul	Aug	Sep	Oct	Nov	Dec	Year
Mean daily maximum °C (°F)	26 (79)	27 (81)	28 (82)	29 (84)	30 (86)	29 (84)	28 (82)	29 (84)	29 (84)	28 (82)	27 (81)	27 (81)	28 (83)
Mean daily minimum °C (°F)	21 (70)	21 (70)	21 (70)	22 (72)	23 (73)	23 (73)	22 (72)	22 (72)	22 (72)	22 (72)	22 (72)	22 (72)	22 (72)
Average precipitation mm (inches)	98 (3.9)	82 (3.2)	96 (3.8)	71 (2.8)	104 (4.1)	129 (5.1)	101 (4.0)	94 (3.7)	99 (3.9)	135 (5.3)	174 (6.9)	143 (5.6)	1,326 (52.3)
Average rainy days	18.0	14.1	17.1	16.8	23.7	25.7	25.8	23.3	24.2	25.9	24.0	20.6	259.2
Source: Meteoblue

== Demographics ==
Population census of Sagbayan
Year	Pop.	±% p.a.
1960	8,720	—
1970	10,822	+2.18%
1975	12,500	+2.93%
1980	12,703	+0.32%
1990	15,364	+1.92%
1995	16,488	+1.33%
2000	18,346	+2.32%
2007	19,399	+0.77%
2010	20,091	+1.28%
2015	22,339	+2.04%
2020	24,335	+1.82%
2024	25,329	+0.97%
Source: Philippine Statistics Authority

== Economy ==
Poverty incidence of Sagbayan

Source: Philippine Statistics Authority

== Gallery ==
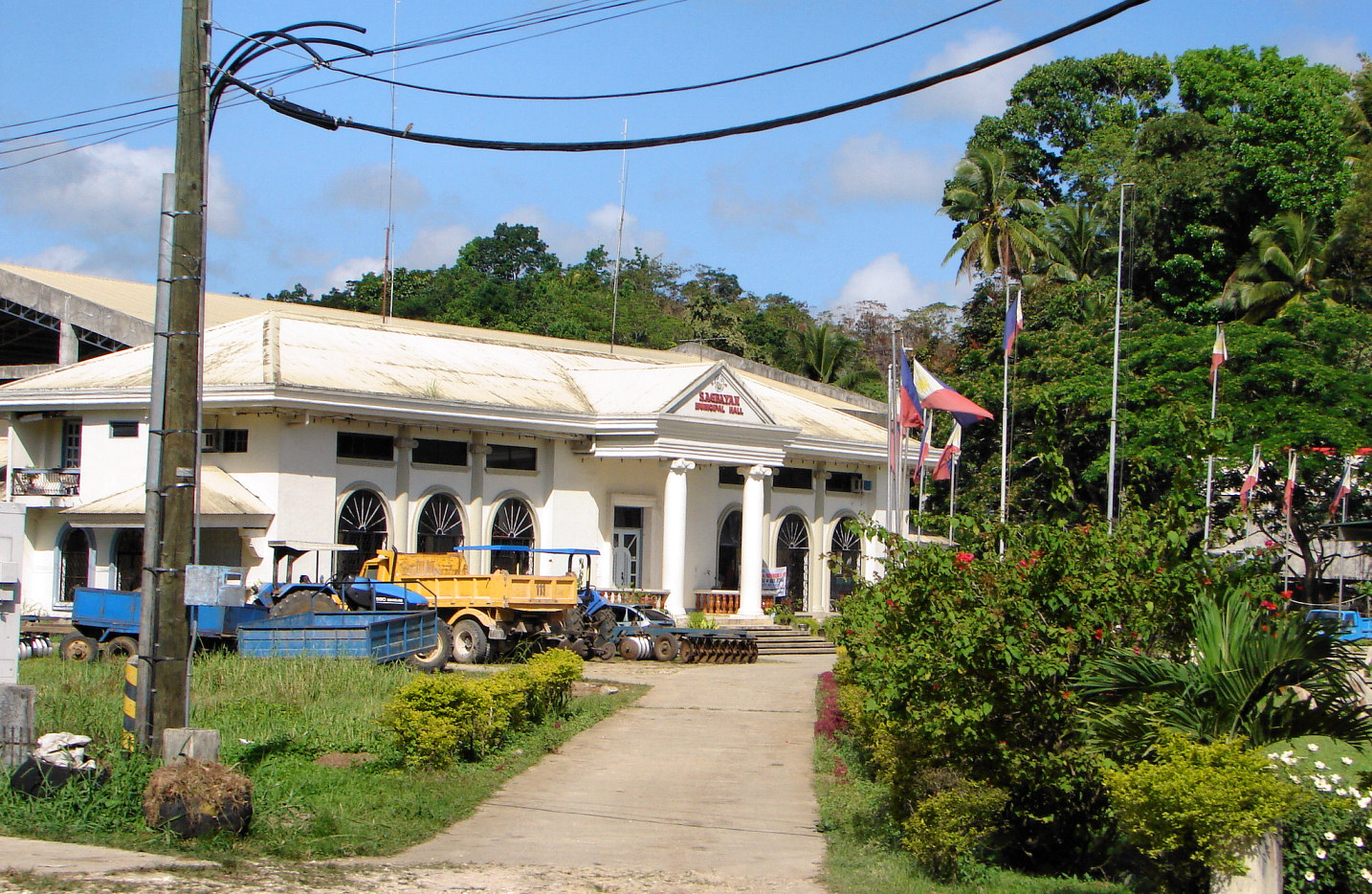
Municipal Building (totally destroyed in the 2013 earthquake)

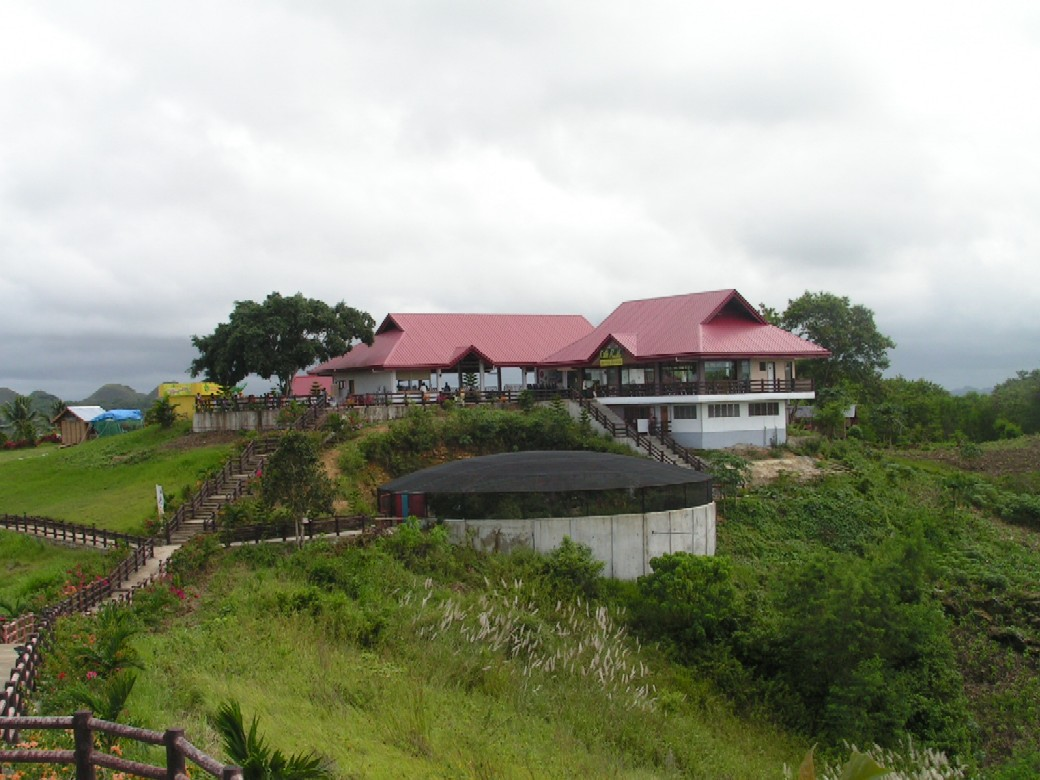
Sagbayan Peak

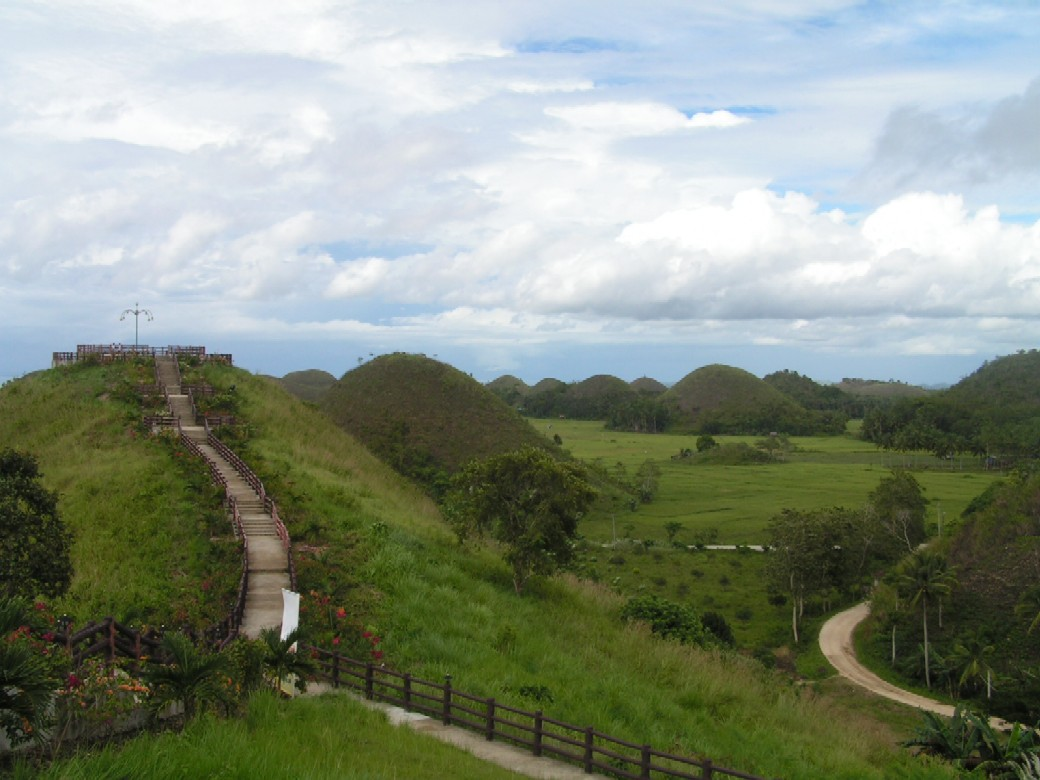
View of the Chocolate Hills from Sagbayan Peak

== See also ==
- List of renamed cities and municipalities of the Philippines
