= Sierra Bullones =

Municipality in Bohol, Philippines

- Municipality
- Municipality of Sierra Bullones
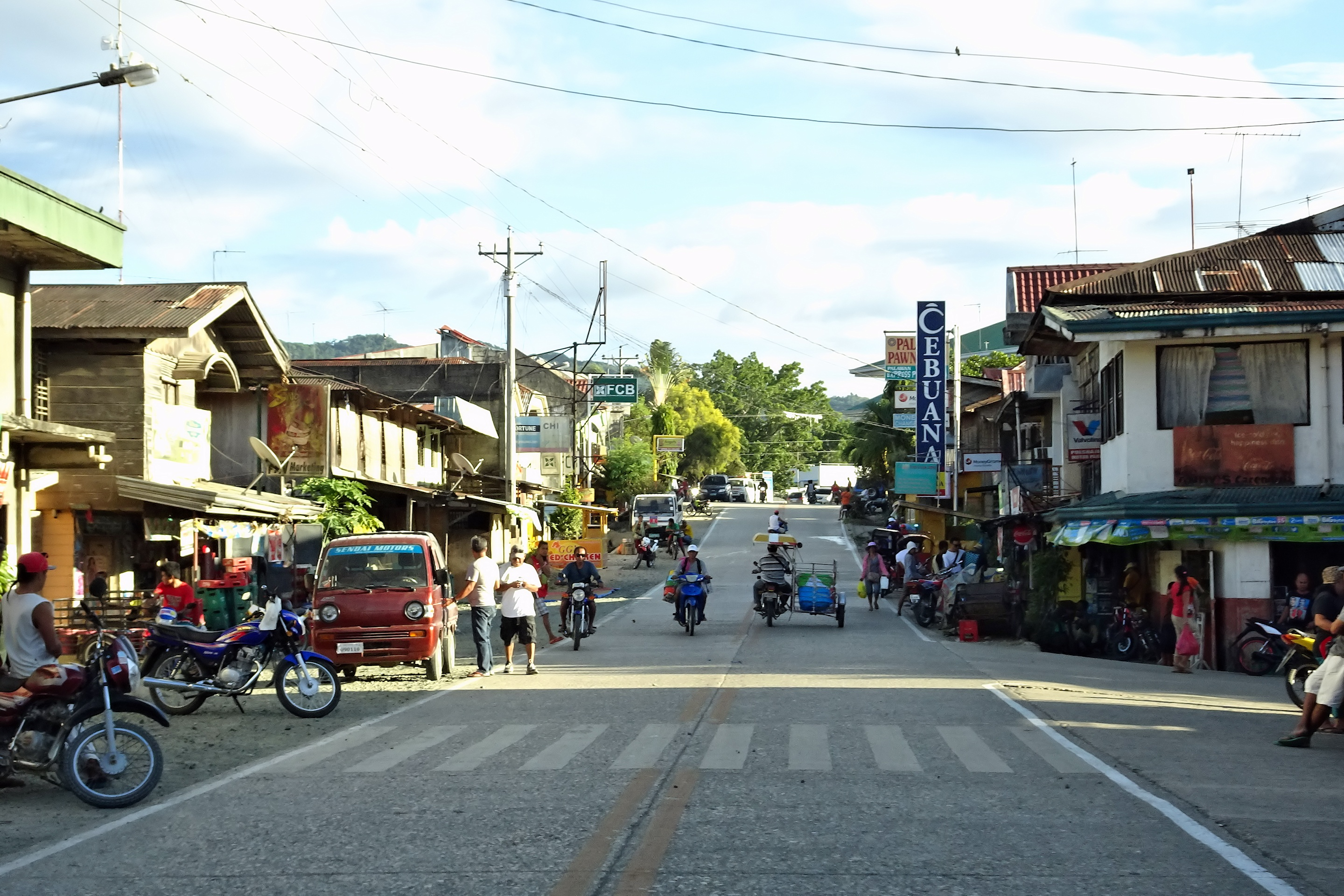
- Sierra Bullones, Bohol

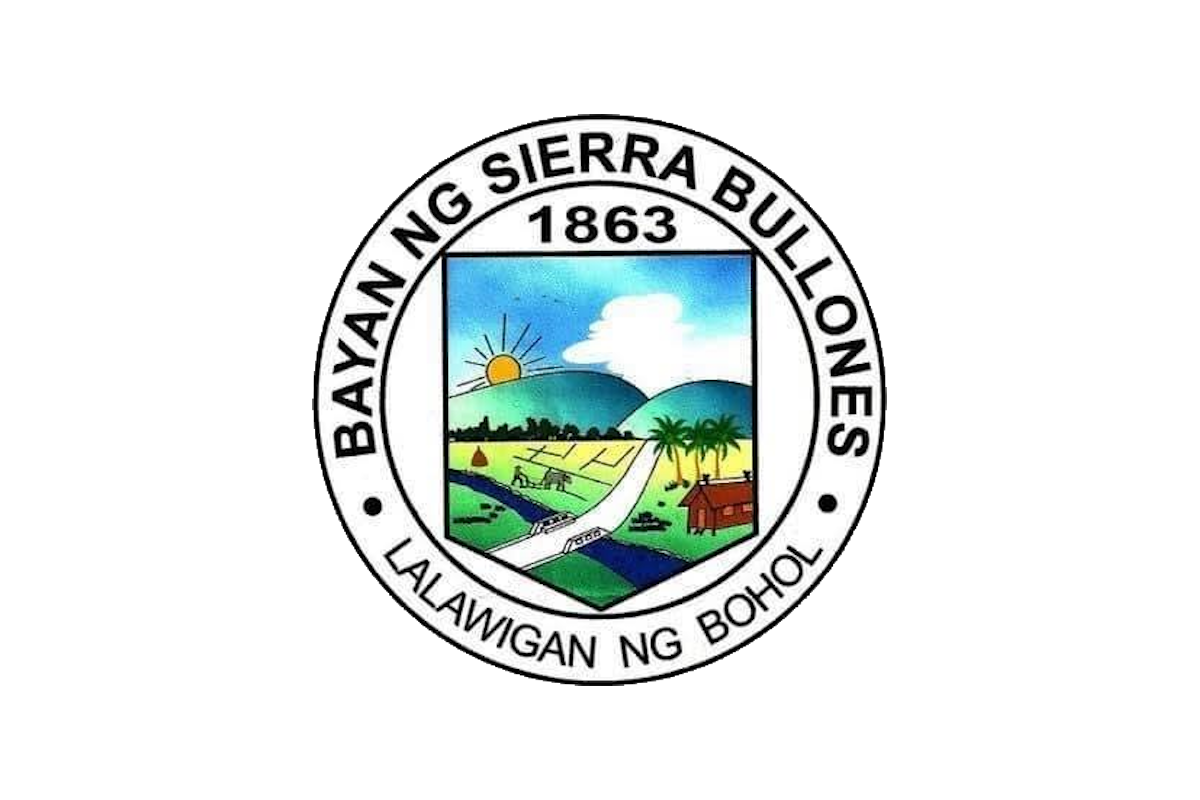
- Flag
- Nickname: Golden Town of Bohol
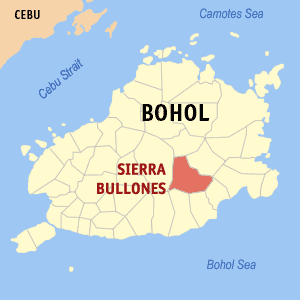
- Map of Bohol with Sierra Bullones highlighted
- Interactive map of Sierra Bullones
- Location within the Philippines
- Coordinates: 9°49′N 124°17′E
- Country: Philippines
- Region: Central Visayas
- Province: Bohol
- District: 3rd district
- Founded: 5 January 1863
- Barangays: 22 (see Barangays)

Government
  - Type: Sangguniang Bayan
  - Mayor: Michael Doria (suspended); Dodie Maestrado (acting)
  - Vice Mayor: Patrick Unajan
  - Representative: Kristine Alexie B. Tutor
  - Municipal Council: Members: Michael I. Doria; Gia D. Bungabong; Josine H. Blawis; Alfredo U. Gamalo; Nador E. Jabay; Jose Freddie M. Buslon; Niceforo G. Butron; Antonio P. Muñoz Jr.
  - Electorate: 18,517 voters (2025)

Area
  - Total: 198.87 km^{2} (76.78 sq mi)
- Elevation: 558 m (1,831 ft)
- Highest elevation: 874 m (2,867 ft)
- Lowest elevation: 41 m (135 ft)

Population (2024 census)
  - Total: 26,154
  - Density: 131.51/km^{2} (340.62/sq mi)
  - Households: 5,892

Economy
  - Income class: 2nd municipal income class
  - Poverty incidence: 24.07% (2023)
  - Revenue: ₱ 184.6 million (2024)
  - Assets: ₱ 592.2 million (2024)
  - Expenditure: ₱ 95.95 million (2024)
  - Liabilities: ₱ 63.15 million (2024)

Service provider
  - Electricity: Bohol 2 Electric Cooperative (BOHECO 2)
- Time zone: UTC+8 (PST)
- ZIP code: 6320
- PSGC: 071240000
- IDD : area code: +63 (0)38
- Native languages: Boholano dialect Cebuano; Eskayan; Tagalog

Sierra Bullones, officially the Municipality of Sierra Bullones (Cebuano: Munisipyo sa Sierra Bullones; Tagalog: Bayan ng Sierra Bullones), is a municipality in the province of Bohol, Philippines. According to the 2024 census, it has a population of 26,154 people.

It is 71 kilometers (44 mi) from Tagbilaran.

Sierra Bullones celebrates its fiesta on December 8, to honor the town patron, the Immaculate Concepcion.

== Etymology ==
The name of town was derived from Spanish words, Sierra which means mountain range and Bulliones, which means bullions (of Gold). During Spanish era, it was said that a number of wealthy Europeans residents buried gold treasures somewhere between the southern barangays of Cantaub and Dusita.

== History ==
On January 5, 1863, Sierra Bullones was created a town both in religious and civil aspect, merging the barangays of Pamacsalan, Dinao (Bicao), Panagsagan (Guadalupe), Busoc (Bugsoc), Danicop, and Catagdaan. These villages were carved out from the towns of Candijay, Talibon, Bilar, Jagna, and Batuanan (Alicia).

Initially, the seat of government of the town was at sitio Banlasan of barangay Pamaclasan. Banlasan was later renamed Alegria when it became a separate barrio in 1845. However, constant flooding from Wahig River pushed the residents to transfer their town center further south at barangay Candagas and converted it as Poblacion. Alegria on the other hand was later called Lungsod Daan which means old town.

On March 1, 1869, barangays of Dinao (Bicao) and Panagsagan (Guadalupe) together with other barrios from nearby Bilar were carved out from the municipality to create the town of Carmen.

On June 21, 1956, barangays of Caluasan, Candelaria, and San Miguel were re-organized and taken from the municipality with other barriors from Carmen, Trinidad, and Ubay to form the town of Dagohoy, through Executive Order No. 184 issued by President Ramon Magsaysay.

On December 29, 1961, the northern half of the town, consisting of barangays of Aurora, Bagacay, Bagumbayan, Bayong, Buena Suerte, Cagawasan, Catagdaan, Estaca, Ilaud, Lungsod Daan (Poblacion) with sitio Lumbay, Pamacsalan, Rizal (with sitio Del Pilar), and San Carlos carved out from its territories including other barangays from Candijay, Guindulman, and Ubay to form the new municipality of Pilar through Executive Order No. 460 issued by President Carlos P. Garcia.

== Geography ==
=== Barangays ===
Sierra Bullones is politically subdivided into 22 barangays. Each barangay consists of puroks and some have sitios.

PSGC	Barangay	Population			±% p.a.	
		2024		2010		
071240001	Abachanan	7.7%	2,018	1,999	▴	0.07%
071240002	Anibongan	2.7%	698	707	▾	−0.09%
071240003	Bugsoc	9.7%	2,542	2,583	▾	−0.11%
071240009	Cahayag	1.8%	479	489	▾	−0.14%
071240004	Canlangit	5.4%	1,423	1,390	▴	0.16%
071240005	Canta‑ub	1.4%	373	314	▴	1.20%
071240006	Casilay	1.5%	385	407	▾	−0.38%
071240007	Danicop	3.6%	946	981	▾	−0.25%
071240008	Dusita	2.4%	621	598	▴	0.26%
071240010	La Union	2.5%	644	620	▴	0.26%
071240011	Lataban	2.3%	597	512	▴	1.07%
071240012	Magsaysay	2.3%	591	580	▴	0.13%
071240013	Matin‑ao	5.0%	1,304	1,356	▾	−0.27%
071240014	Nan‑od	4.3%	1,134	1,072	▴	0.39%
071240015	Poblacion	10.6%	2,782	2,763	▴	0.05%
071240016	Salvador	6.7%	1,741	1,716	▴	0.10%
071240017	San Agustin	4.1%	1,083	1,192	▾	−0.66%
071240018	San Isidro	5.3%	1,387	1,419	▾	−0.16%
071240019	San Jose	3.4%	888	879	▴	0.07%
071240020	San Juan	3.7%	960	979	▾	−0.14%
071240021	Santa Cruz	3.5%	924	940	▾	−0.12%
071240022	Villa Garcia	4.7%	1,225	1,202	▴	0.13%
	Total		26,154	24,698	▴	0.40%

=== Climate ===
Climate data for Sierra Bullones, Bohol
Month	Jan	Feb	Mar	Apr	May	Jun	Jul	Aug	Sep	Oct	Nov	Dec	Year
Mean daily maximum °C (°F)	27 (81)	28 (82)	29 (84)	30 (86)	30 (86)	29 (84)	29 (84)	29 (84)	29 (84)	28 (82)	28 (82)	28 (82)	29 (83)
Mean daily minimum °C (°F)	22 (72)	21 (70)	22 (72)	22 (72)	23 (73)	24 (75)	23 (73)	23 (73)	23 (73)	23 (73)	22 (72)	22 (72)	23 (73)
Average precipitation mm (inches)	102 (4.0)	85 (3.3)	91 (3.6)	75 (3.0)	110 (4.3)	141 (5.6)	121 (4.8)	107 (4.2)	111 (4.4)	144 (5.7)	169 (6.7)	139 (5.5)	1,395 (55.1)
Average rainy days	18.6	14.8	16.5	16.7	23.9	26.4	25.6	24.1	24.4	26.3	23.7	20.5	261.5
Source: Meteoblue

== Demographics ==
Population census of Sierra Bullones
Year	Pop.	±% p.a.
1903	2,683	—
1918	6,446	+6.02%
1939	15,964	+4.41%
1948	19,385	+2.18%
1960	19,347	−0.02%
1970	13,807	−3.31%
1975	15,132	+1.85%
1980	17,904	+3.42%
1990	21,101	+1.66%
1995	20,787	−0.28%
2000	25,499	+4.48%
2007	26,398	+0.48%
2010	24,698	−2.39%
2015	24,745	+0.04%
2020	26,095	+1.12%
2024	26,154	+0.05%
Source: Philippine Statistics Authority

== Economy ==
Poverty incidence of Sierra Bullones (%)

Source: Philippine Statistics Authority

== Gallery ==
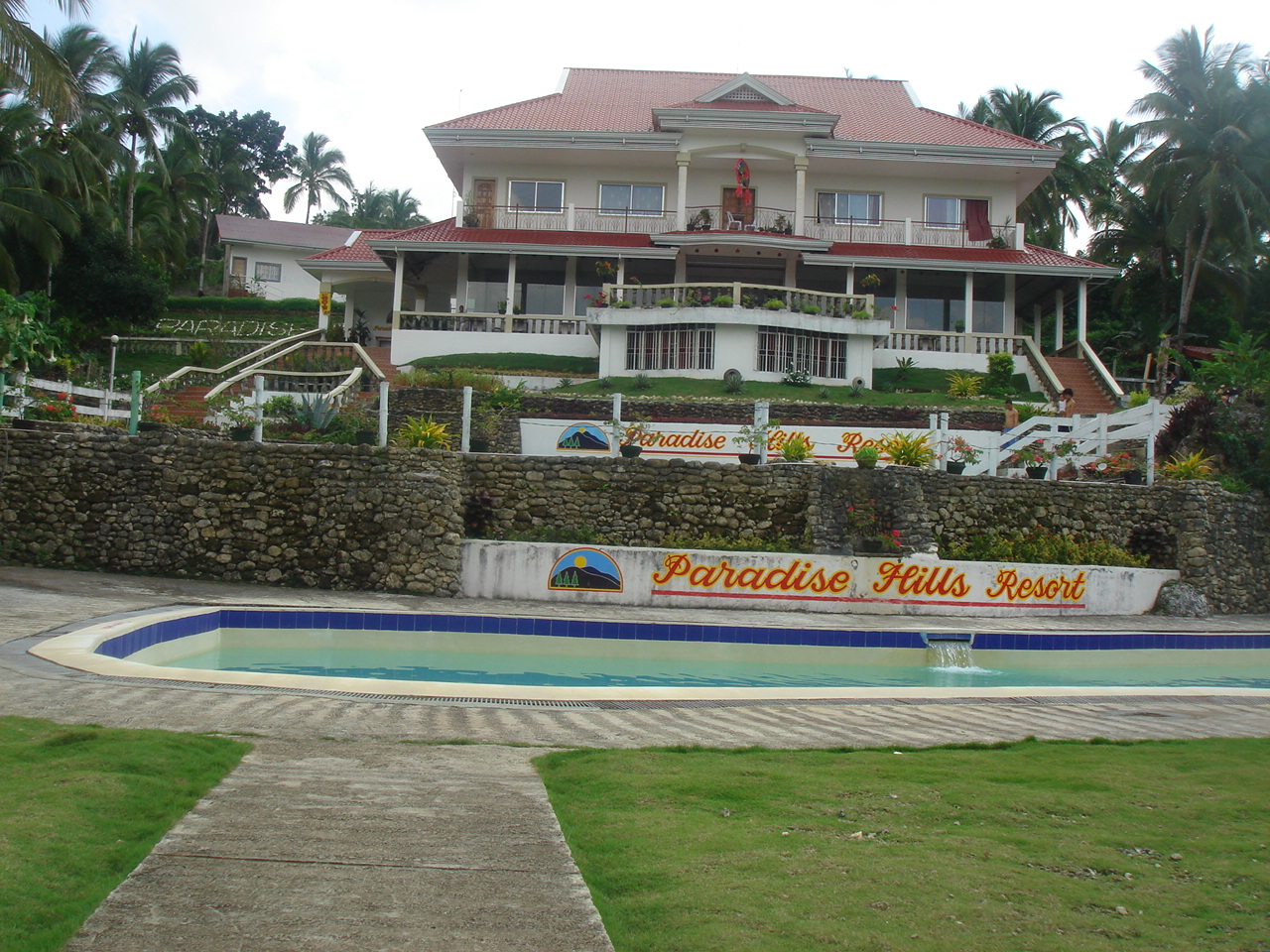
Paradise Hills Resort, Sierra Bullones

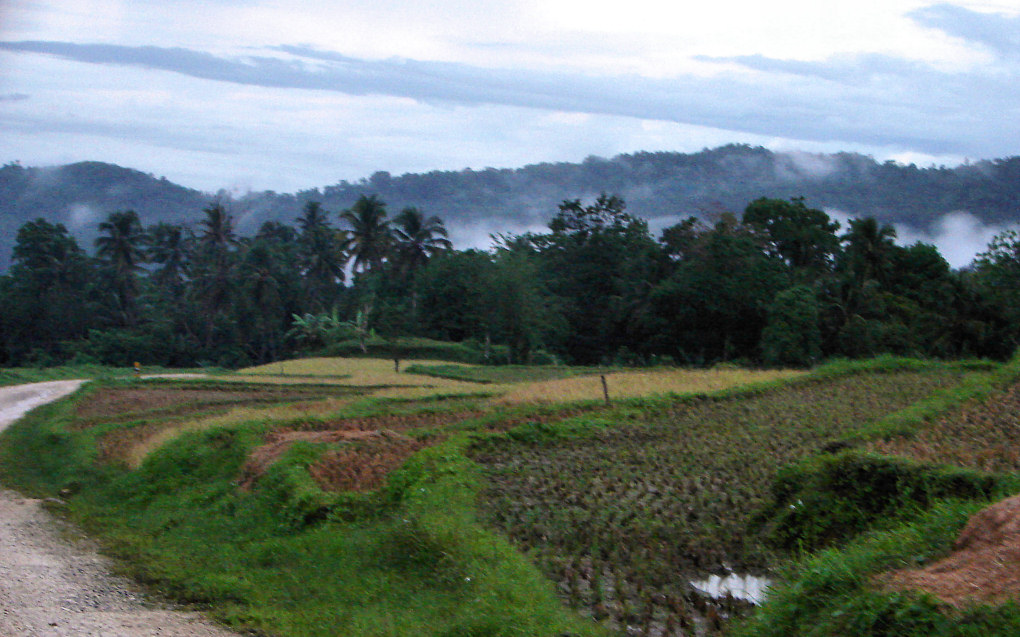
Rice terraces in the hills of Sierra Bullones
