= Valencia, Bohol =

Municipality in Bohol, Philippines

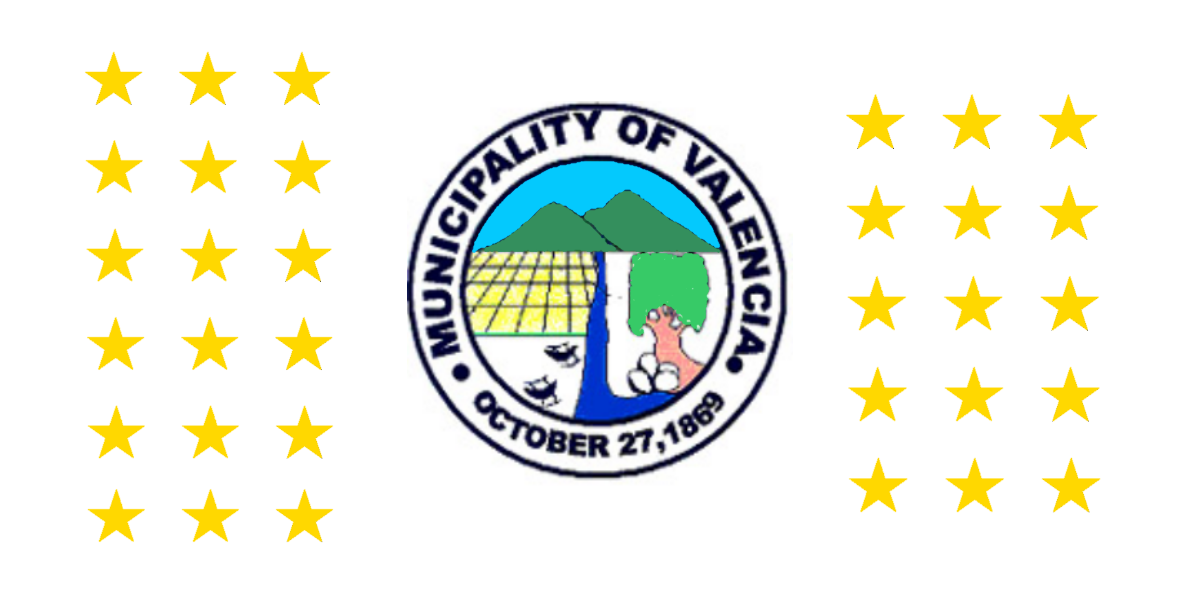
- Flag Seal

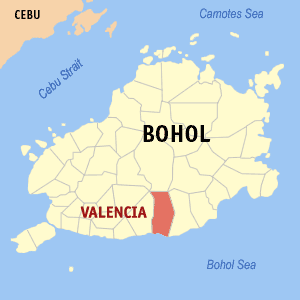
- Map of Bohol with Valencia highlighted
- Interactive map of Valencia, Bohol
- Location within the Philippines
- Coordinates: 9°36′35″N 124°12′29″E
- Country: Philippines
- Region: Central Visayas
- Province: Bohol
- District: 3rd district
- Founded: 1867
- Named for: Valencia, Spain
- Barangays: 35 (see Barangays)

Government
  - Type: Sangguniang Bayan
  - Mayor: Dionisio Neil A. Balite (suspended); Aristotle C. Cometa (acting)
  - Vice Mayor: Armando Namoc
  - Representative: Kristine Alexie B. Tutor
  - Municipal Council: Members: Zenon D. Bete; Ritche Emmanuel N. Salise; Silvano C. Dajang; Arnel C. Gamba; Rito T. Cagatin; Marcelinda B. Namoc; Victor B. Cahig; Inocencio D. Tagud
  - Electorate: 19,309 voters (2025)

Area
  - Total: 116.67 km^{2} (45.05 sq mi)
- Elevation: 75 m (246 ft)
- Highest elevation: 485 m (1,591 ft)
- Lowest elevation: 0 m (0 ft)

Population (2024 census)
  - Total: 28,535
  - Density: 244.58/km^{2} (633.46/sq mi)
  - Households: 6,072

Economy
  - Income class: 3rd municipal income class
  - Poverty incidence: 24.09% (2023)
  - Revenue: ₱ 176.8 million (2024)
  - Assets: ₱ 584.1 million (2024)
  - Expenditure: ₱ 86.69 million (2024)
  - Liabilities: ₱ 214.2 million (2024)

Service provider
  - Electricity: Bohol 2 Electric Cooperative (BOHECO 2)
- Time zone: UTC+8 (PST)
- ZIP code: 6306
- PSGC: 071247000
- IDD : area code: +63 (0)38
- Native languages: Boholano dialect Cebuano; Tagalog

Valencia, officially the Municipality of Valencia (Cebuano: Munisipalidad sa Valencia; Tagalog: Bayan ng Valencia), is a municipality in the province of Bohol, Philippines. According to the 2024 census, it has a population of 28,535 people.

It is on the southern coast of Bohol, 46 kilometres (29 mi) from Tagbilaran.

There are elementary schools in the poblacion and in the barrios. For their secondary education, students go to Valencia High School, a public school.

Valencia celebrates its feast on every 3rd Saturday of January to honor the town patron saint, Sr. Santo Niño.

== History ==
Its former name used to be Panangatan, which comes from the root word sang-at, meaning "to put up on an elevated place". This referred to the practice of fishermen from Dimiao and Lila who would put up (sang-at) their boats on the banks of the Panangatan River when taking shelter during the southwest monsoons. Here nipa palms grew along the river, preventing the boats from being washed away by the waves.

Panangatan remained part of Dimiao until 1867. That year a Spanish priest was assigned to the place and it became a separate municipality. The priest gave it a new name, naming after his birthplace in Spain. In 1879 Valencia had a population of 7,009.

== Geography ==
=== Barangays ===
Valencia is politically subdivided into 35 barangays:. Each barangay consists of puroks and some have sitios.

PSGC	Barangay	Population			±% p.a.	
		2024		2010		
071247001	Adlawan	1.7%	493	588	▾	−1.22%
071247002	Anas	6.0%	1,719	1,826	▾	−0.42%
071247003	Anonang	3.1%	888	972	▾	−0.63%
071247004	Anoyon	1.7%	497	496	▴	0.01%
071247005	Balingasao	7.7%	2,193	2,297	▾	−0.32%
071247035	Banderahan (Upper Ginopolan)	3.1%	872	933	▾	−0.47%
071247006	Botong	2.0%	583	694	▾	−1.20%
071247007	Buyog	1.5%	420	436	▾	−0.26%
071247008	Canduao Occidental	2.8%	797	767	▴	0.27%
071247009	Canduao Oriental	2.3%	660	785	▾	−1.20%
071247010	Canlusong	3.7%	1,067	1,020	▴	0.31%
071247011	Canmanico	7.5%	2,133	2,132	▴	0.00%
071247012	Cansibao	3.5%	995	925	▴	0.51%
071247013	Catug‑an	1.5%	414	439	▾	−0.41%
071247014	Cutcutan	3.2%	904	905	▾	−0.01%
071247015	Danao	2.2%	616	594	▴	0.25%
071247016	Genoveva	1.9%	541	536	▴	0.06%
071247017	Ginopolan (Ginopolan Proper)	2.7%	772	827	▾	−0.48%
071247018	La Victoria	3.4%	984	1,044	▾	−0.41%
071247019	Lantang	3.6%	1,014	942	▴	0.51%
071247020	Limocon	1.1%	311	424	▾	−2.13%
071247021	Loctob	2.4%	692	678	▴	0.14%
071247022	Magsaysay	2.2%	617	533	▴	1.02%
071247023	Marawis	2.0%	563	587	▾	−0.29%
071247024	Maubo	1.8%	517	472	▴	0.63%
071247025	Nailo	1.6%	462	461	▴	0.02%
071247026	Omjon	4.2%	1,192	1,184	▴	0.05%
071247027	Pangi‑an	1.4%	405	387	▴	0.32%
071247028	Poblacion Occidental (Sawang)	5.3%	1,508	1,496	▴	0.06%
071247029	Poblacion Oriental (Sur)	3.2%	917	928	▾	−0.08%
071247030	Simang	1.7%	480	466	▴	0.21%
071247031	Taug	1.5%	439	492	▾	−0.79%
071247032	Tausi-on	2.1%	589	618	▾	−0.33%
071247033	Taytay	2.3%	651	639	▴	0.13%
071247034	Ticum	2.9%	818	779	▴	0.34%
	Total		28,535	27,586	▴	0.24%

=== Climate ===
Climate data for Valencia, Bohol
Month	Jan	Feb	Mar	Apr	May	Jun	Jul	Aug	Sep	Oct	Nov	Dec	Year
Mean daily maximum °C (°F)	28 (82)	29 (84)	30 (86)	31 (88)	31 (88)	30 (86)	30 (86)	30 (86)	30 (86)	29 (84)	29 (84)	29 (84)	30 (85)
Mean daily minimum °C (°F)	23 (73)	22 (72)	23 (73)	23 (73)	24 (75)	25 (77)	24 (75)	24 (75)	24 (75)	24 (75)	23 (73)	23 (73)	24 (74)
Average precipitation mm (inches)	102 (4.0)	85 (3.3)	91 (3.6)	75 (3.0)	110 (4.3)	141 (5.6)	121 (4.8)	107 (4.2)	111 (4.4)	144 (5.7)	169 (6.7)	139 (5.5)	1,395 (55.1)
Average rainy days	18.6	14.8	16.5	16.7	23.9	26.4	25.6	24.1	24.4	26.3	23.7	20.5	261.5
Source: Meteoblue

== Demographics ==
Population census of Valencia
Year	Pop.	±% p.a.
1903	7,809	—
1918	10,555	+2.03%
1939	13,653	+1.23%
1948	15,289	+1.27%
1960	15,596	+0.17%
1970	16,888	+0.80%
1975	18,229	+1.54%
1980	18,655	+0.46%
1990	20,879	+1.13%
1995	22,423	+1.35%
2000	24,363	+1.79%
2007	28,043	+1.96%
2010	27,586	−0.60%
2015	27,126	−0.32%
2020	28,392	+0.96%
2024	28,535	+0.12%
Source: Philippine Statistics Authority

== Economy ==
Poverty incidence of Valencia (%)

Source: Philippine Statistics Authority

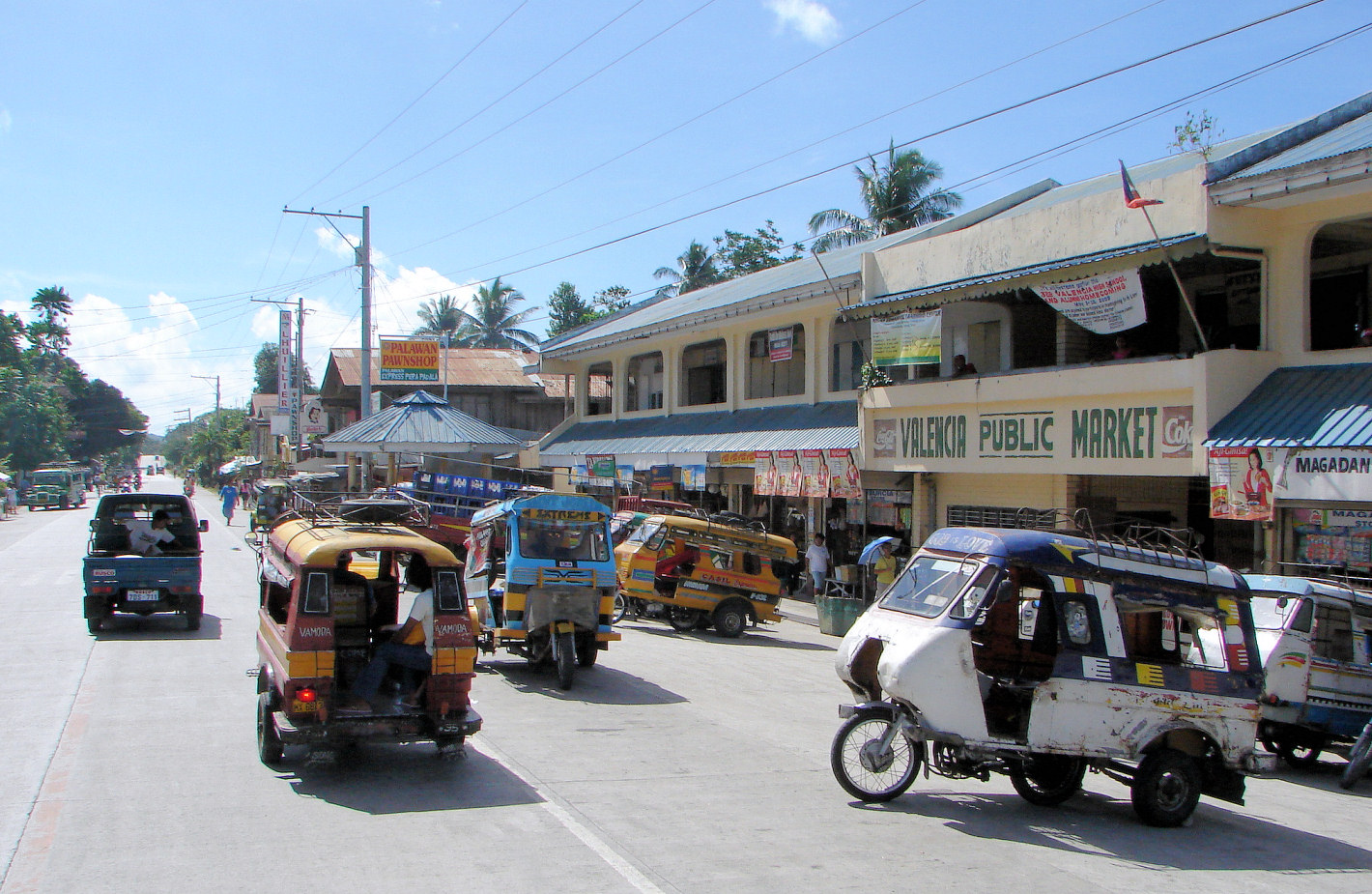
Valencia Public Market

The principal industries of the people today are weaving, pot making, and fishing. The most important produce is coconuts, rice, corn and fish.

Market day, locally known as Tabu, is Sunday. Local produce such as fresh fruits, vegetable, fresh meat and live poultry are sold. The days of this weekly community occasion differ from town to town.

Badiang Spring resort in barangay Anas is a major contribution to local economic activity. Badiang Spring has continuously flowing water from subterranean rocks, which is its main attraction. Not just domestic tourists but foreign tourists too frequent the 1,250-square-metre (13,500 sq ft) lot by the shore. Badiang Spring has separate swimming pools for adults and children as well as accommodation facilities.

== Culture ==
=== Valencia Parish Church ===
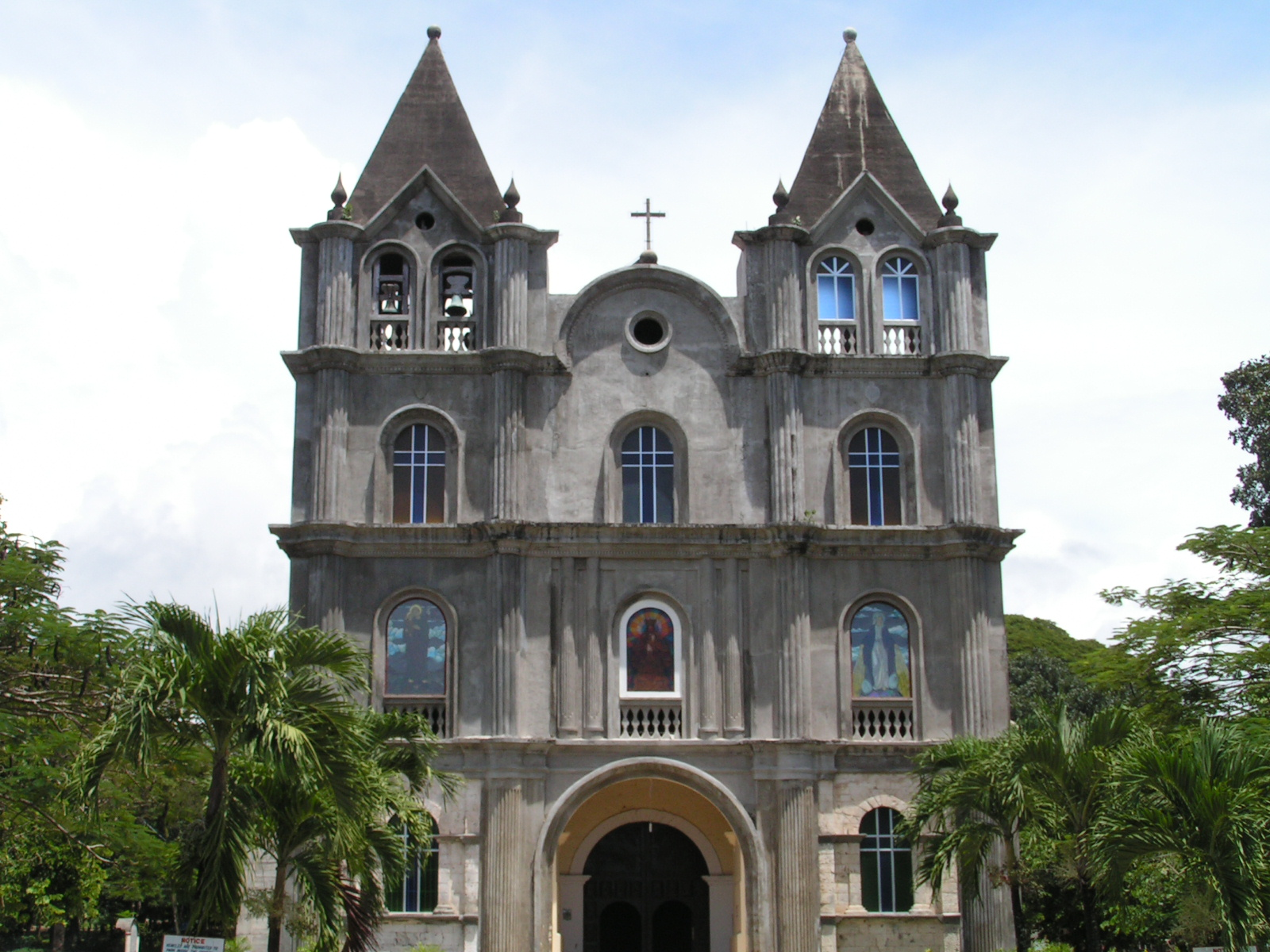
Roman Catholic Church, Valencia

The parish of the Santo Niño and the town of Valencia began as barrio Panangatan of Dimiao. Together with adjacent barrios, it was constituted a town in 1869 and a parish in 1871 and named after a city on Spain's southern coast. The church building commenced during the term of Fray Mariano Cornago (1870–77) and was completed in 1882 by Fray Francisco Arraya, who laid the church's wooden floor. The church walls were of tabique but were later replaced by cement.

Heritage Site: The church is cruciform with a steep roof and a pyramidal crossing tower. Cut stone is used in parts of the church like the façade, however, concrete is found elsewhere. The real treasure of the church is its wooden floor of alternating dark (tindalo or balayong) and light (molave or tugas) wood planks. At the transept crossing an eight pointed flower design is used for the floor, while a herringbone pattern is used elsewhere. The interior is unpainted, unlike most Bohol churches and has altars in the neoclassical idiom.

The convent is located not beside the church as is customary but across the street. This structure was renovated in the 19th century. The fencing of the entire campus of the convent is recent.
