= Carmen, Bohol =

Municipality in Bohol, Philippines

Carmen
- Municipality
- Municipality of Carmen
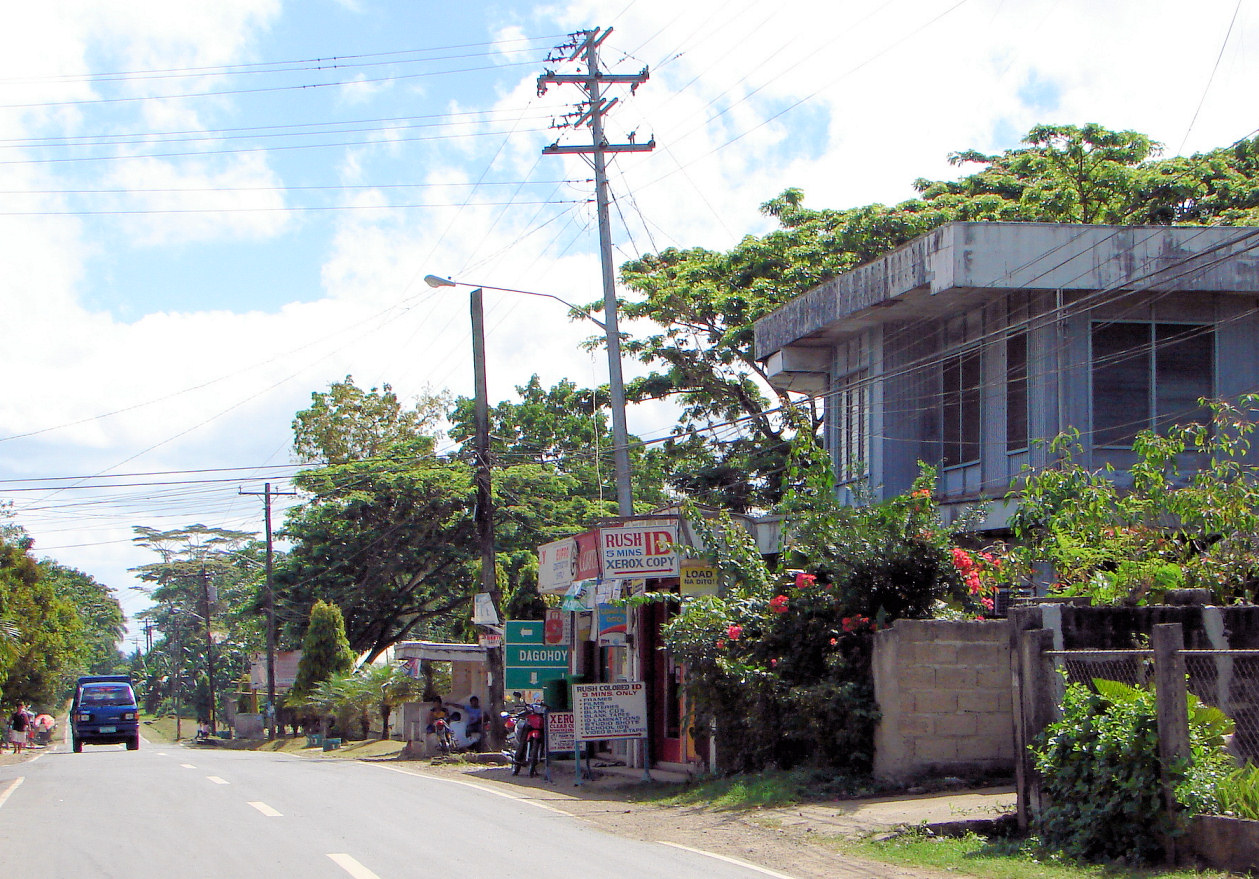
- Chocolate Hills tourism deck

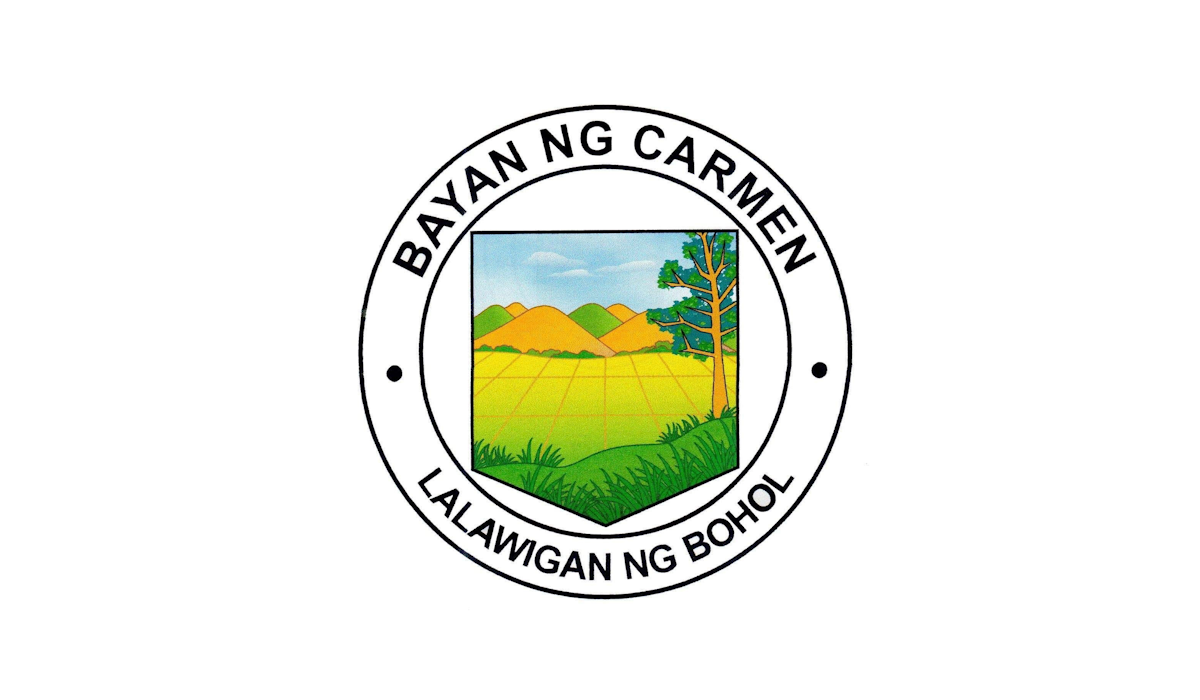
- Flag
- Nickname: Home of the Great Chocolate Hills
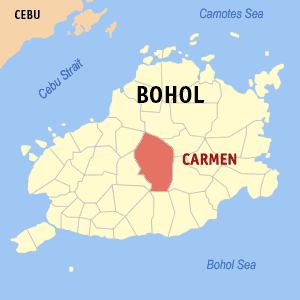
- Map of Bohol with Carmen highlighted
- Interactive map of Carmen
- Location within the Philippines
- Coordinates: 9°49′N 124°12′E
- Country: Philippines
- Region: Central Visayas
- Province: Bohol
- District: 3rd district
- Founded: 1 March 1869
- Barangays: 29 (see Barangays)

Government
  - Type: Sangguniang Bayan
  - Mayor: Conchita Toribio Delos Reyes
  - Vice Mayor: Richard Francisco A. Toribio
  - Representative: Kristine Alexie B. Tutor
  - Municipal Council: Members: Romeo C. Bigay, Jr.; Pedro E. Budiongan, Jr.; Paulito B. Budiongan; Manuel Elizalde T. Clavite; Victoriano M. Adlaon; Jocelyn B. Sombrio; Christian Paul T. Ordoñez; Christine Camille U. Ramos
  - Electorate: 35,223 voters (2025)

Area
  - Total: 239.45 km^{2} (92.45 sq mi)
- Elevation: 258 m (846 ft)
- Highest elevation: 440 m (1,440 ft)
- Lowest elevation: 147 m (482 ft)

Population (2024 census)
  - Total: 50,249
  - Density: 209.85/km^{2} (543.51/sq mi)
  - Households: 11,244

Economy
  - Income class: 1st municipal income class
  - Poverty incidence: 21.19% (2023)
  - Revenue: ₱ 378.8 million (2024)
  - Assets: ₱ 1,045 million (2024)
  - Expenditure: ₱ 177.7 million (2024)
  - Liabilities: ₱ 270.4 million (2024)

Service provider
  - Electricity: Bohol 1 Electric Cooperative (BOHECO 1)
  - Mobile carriers: Smart(4G); TNT(4G); Globe(4G); TM(4G); GOMO(4G); Dito(4G)
  - Fiber Internet: PLDT, Globe
- Time zone: UTC+8 (PST)
- ZIP code: 6319
- PSGC: 071212000
- IDD : area code: +63 (0)38
- Native languages: Boholano dialect Cebuano; Tagalog
- Patron saint: Anthony de Abbot

Carmen, officially the Municipality of Carmen (Cebuano: Munisipalidad sa Carmen; Tagalog: Bayan ng Carmen), is a municipality in the province of Bohol, Philippines. According to the 2024 census, it has a population of 50,249 people.

Carmen celebrates its fiesta on January 17, to honor the town patron Saint Anthony de Abbot.

== History ==
Carmen was originally part of the municipality of Bilar and called Imbaya, after the name of a stream in the settlement. During the Spanish time, it was inhabited by not more than fifty families. In 1868, the people of Carmen petitioned for its independence since its population grew to an unprecedented number. The town of Carmen was founded on 1 March 1869 by final order of Governor General Jose de la Gandara and renamed at the same time in honor of the Lady of Carmel of Spain. In 1874, Carmen had its separate parish with Father Pedro Nolasco San Juan as the first parish priest.

Due to the influence of Spanish culture and tradition, all barangays of Carmen have a patron saint as well as a Spanish name, who are celebrated in an annual barangay fiesta.

In World War II, Carmen served as the stronghold of the guerrilla resistance movement and the local civil government because of its strategic location.

In 2013 a magnitude 7.2 earthquake shook Central Visayas region, with its epicenter within Carmen municipality.

== Geography ==
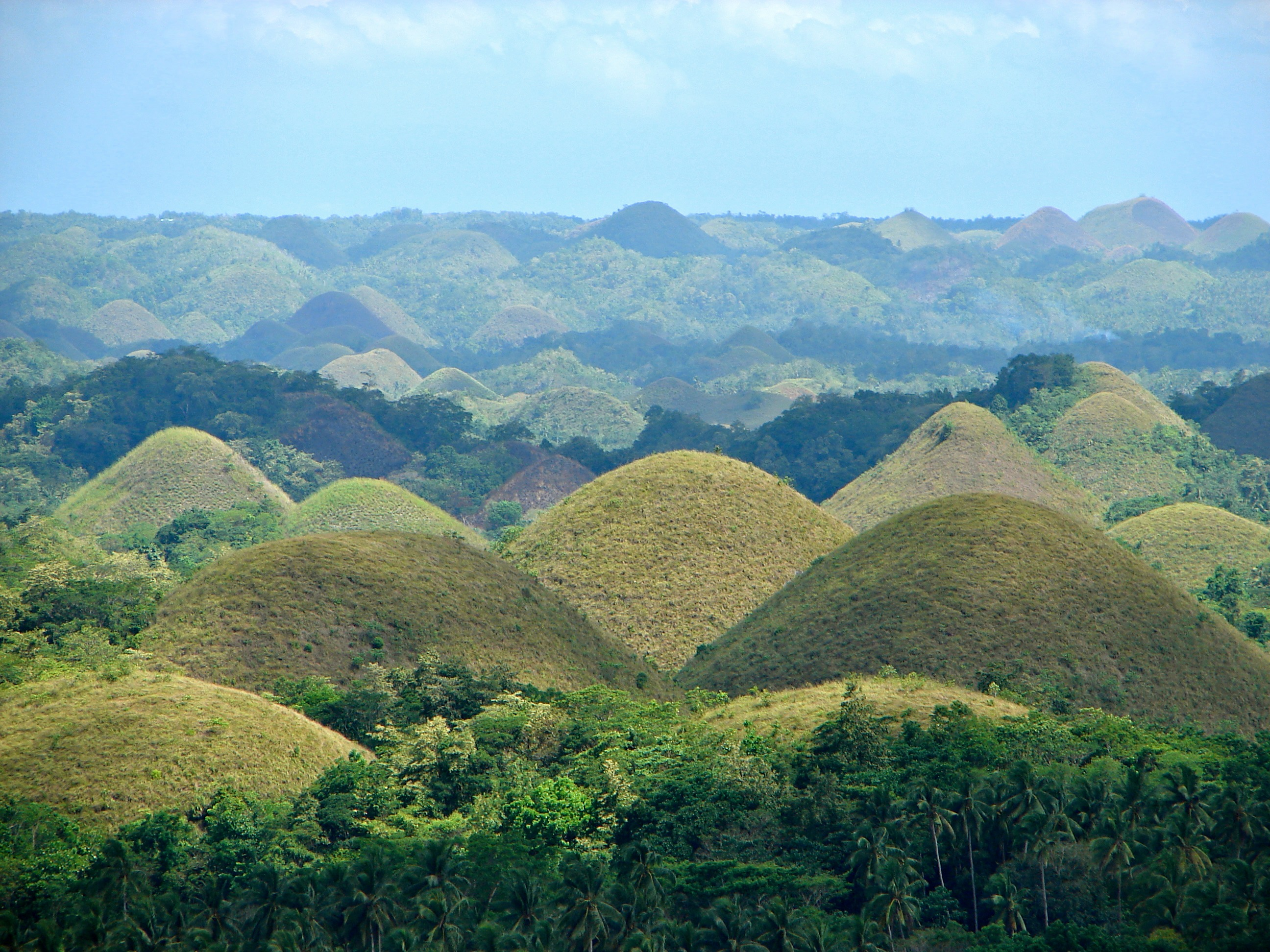
Chocolate Hills in Carmen, Bohol

Carmen is located in the heart of Bohol Island. The Chocolate Hills, composed of 1,776 cone-shaped karst hills, are a major geographic landmark in Carmen. The origin of its name comes from the fact that the hills turn brown in the hot summer days.

Carmen is 59 kilometres (37 mi) from Tagbilaran.

=== Barangays ===
Carmen is politically subdivided into 29 barangays. Each barangay consists of puroks and some have sitios.

PSGC	Barangay	Population			±% p.a.	
		2024		2010		
071212001	Alegria	2.5%	1,253	1,199	▴	0.31%
071212002	Bicao	5.1%	2,546	2,295	▴	0.72%
071212003	Buenavista	5.2%	2,605	2,546	▴	0.16%
071212004	Buenos Aires	2.8%	1,407	1,337	▴	0.36%
071212005	Calatrava	3.9%	1,974	1,801	▴	0.64%
071212006	El Progreso	1.8%	890	820	▴	0.57%
071212007	El Salvador	1.1%	566	543	▴	0.29%
071212008	Guadalupe	4.1%	2,080	1,991	▴	0.30%
071212009	Katipunan	6.0%	3,027	2,712	▴	0.77%
071212010	La Libertad	1.6%	804	840	▾	−0.30%
071212011	La Paz	2.9%	1,480	1,430	▴	0.24%
071212012	La Salvacion	2.1%	1,053	1,061	▾	−0.05%
071212013	La Victoria	2.4%	1,202	1,100	▴	0.62%
071212014	Matin‑ao	1.8%	882	800	▴	0.68%
071212015	Montehermoso	1.7%	874	952	▾	−0.59%
071212016	Montesuerte	5.3%	2,670	2,467	▴	0.55%
071212017	Montesunting	1.8%	915	870	▴	0.35%
071212018	Montevideo	2.6%	1,295	1,274	▴	0.11%
071212019	Nueva Fuerza	4.8%	2,433	2,281	▴	0.45%
071212020	Nueva Vida Este	1.8%	884	918	▾	−0.26%
071212022	Nueva Vida Norte	1.9%	967	981	▾	−0.10%
071212021	Nueva Vida Sur	1.8%	909	915	▾	−0.05%
071212023	Poblacion Norte	6.4%	3,224	2,937	▴	0.65%
071212024	Poblacion Sur	6.5%	3,279	2,961	▴	0.71%
071212025	Tambo‑an	2.6%	1,301	1,175	▴	0.71%
071212026	Vallehermoso	0.5%	262	241	▴	0.58%
071212027	Villaflor	1.8%	904	863	▴	0.32%
071212028	Villafuerte	2.4%	1,231	1,012	▴	1.37%
071212029	Villacayo	3.8%	1,890	1,789	▴	0.38%
	Total		50,249	43,579	▴	1.00%

=== Climate ===
Climate data for Carmen, Bohol
Month	Jan	Feb	Mar	Apr	May	Jun	Jul	Aug	Sep	Oct	Nov	Dec	Year
Mean daily maximum °C (°F)	27 (81)	27 (81)	28 (82)	30 (86)	29 (84)	28 (82)	28 (82)	28 (82)	28 (82)	27 (81)	27 (81)	27 (81)	28 (82)
Mean daily minimum °C (°F)	21 (70)	21 (70)	21 (70)	22 (72)	23 (73)	23 (73)	23 (73)	23 (73)	23 (73)	22 (72)	22 (72)	21 (70)	22 (72)
Average precipitation mm (inches)	102 (4.0)	85 (3.3)	91 (3.6)	75 (3.0)	110 (4.3)	141 (5.6)	121 (4.8)	107 (4.2)	111 (4.4)	144 (5.7)	169 (6.7)	139 (5.5)	1,395 (55.1)
Average rainy days	18.6	14.8	16.5	16.7	23.9	26.4	25.6	24.1	24.4	26.3	23.7	20.5	261.5
Source: Meteoblue (Use with caution: this is modeled/calculated data, not measured locally.)

== Demographics ==
Downtown area as of July 6, 2026

Population census of Carmen
Year	Pop.	±% p.a.
1903	3,106	—
1918	5,214	+3.51%
1939	14,026	+4.83%
1948	19,006	+3.43%
1960	18,669	−0.15%
1970	19,571	+0.47%
1975	23,580	+3.81%
1980	26,359	+2.25%
1990	34,573	+2.75%
1995	36,797	+1.17%
2000	40,713	+2.19%
2007	43,153	+0.81%
2010	43,579	+0.36%
2015	46,306	+1.16%
2020	49,191	+1.28%
2024	50,249	+0.51%
Source: Philippine Statistics Authority

== Economy ==
Poverty incidence of Carmen (%)

Source: Philippine Statistics Authority
