= Bilar, Bohol =

Municipality in the Philippines

Bilar
- Municipality
- Municipality of Bilar
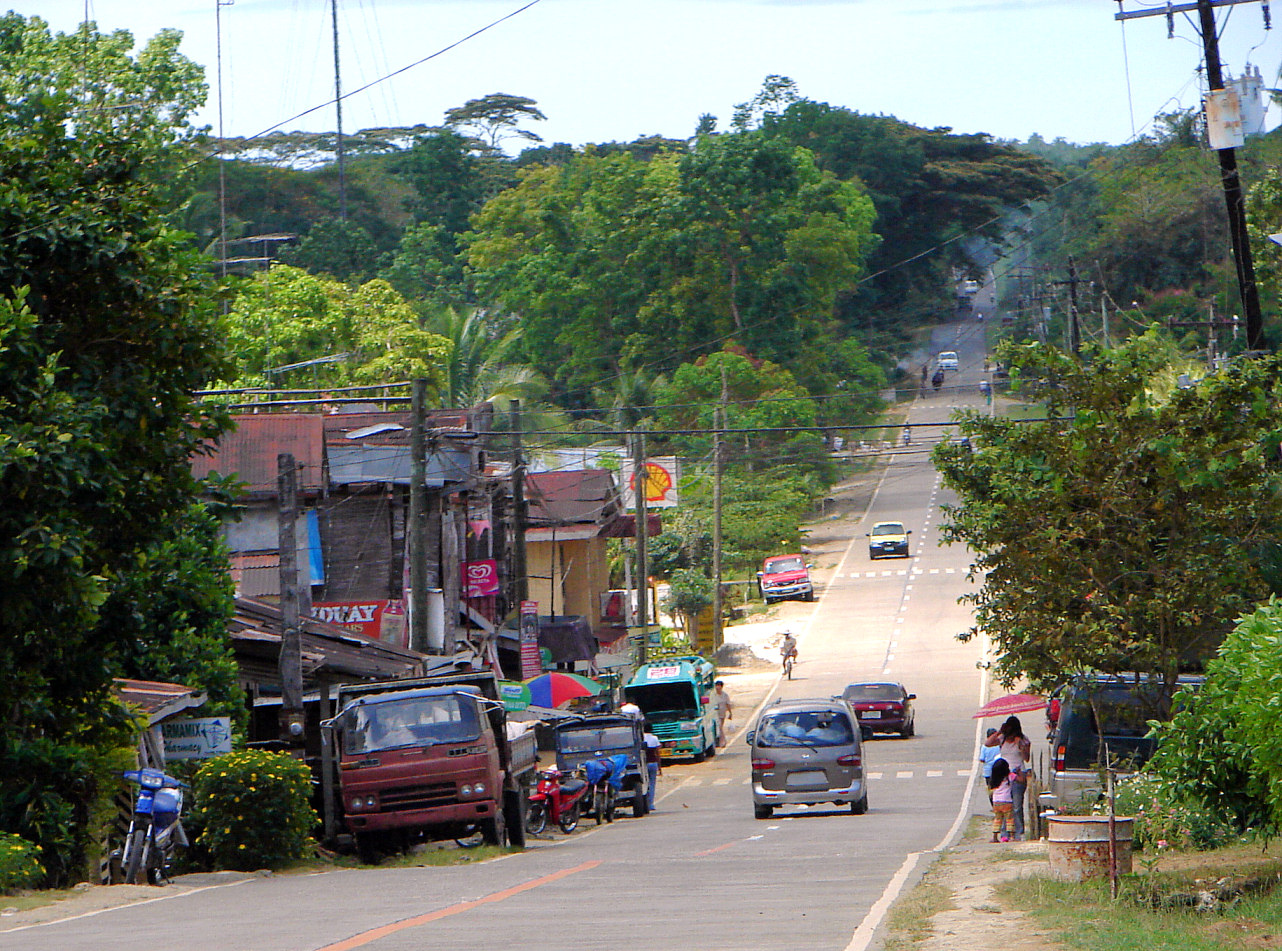
- Bilar, Bohol

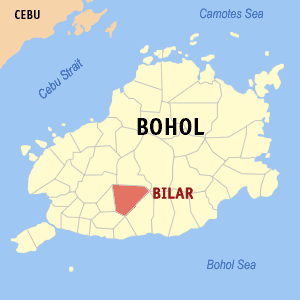
- Interactive map of Bilar
- Location within the Philippines
- Coordinates: 9°42′28″N 124°06′18″E
- Country: Philippines
- Region: Central Visayas
- Province: Bohol
- District: 3rd district
- Barangays: 19 (see Barangays)

Government
  - Type: Sangguniang Bayan
  - Mayor: Norman D. Palacio
  - Vice Mayor: Ranulfo Q. Maligmat
  - Representative: Kristine Alexie B. Tutor
  - Municipal Council: Members: Reneo U. Cabusao; Rodrigo L. Hingaing; Ricardo L. Cal; Panfilo L. Ancog; Ireneo C. Balahay; Casimero A. Loy-a; Anastacio L. Suaybaguio, Jr.; Jeanette L. Valle
  - Electorate: 13,738 voters (2025)

Area
  - Total: 129.71 km^{2} (50.08 sq mi)
- Elevation: 315 m (1,033 ft)
- Highest elevation: 545 m (1,788 ft)
- Lowest elevation: 117 m (384 ft)

Population (2024 census)
  - Total: 18,877
  - Density: 145.53/km^{2} (376.93/sq mi)
  - Households: 4,172

Economy
  - Income class: 4th municipal income class
  - Poverty incidence: 19.64% (2023)
  - Revenue: ₱ 140.7 million (2024)
  - Assets: ₱ 496.5 million (2024)
  - Expenditure: ₱ 155 million (2024)
  - Liabilities: ₱ 57.06 million (2024)

Service provider
  - Electricity: Bohol 1 Electric Cooperative (BOHECO 1)
- Time zone: UTC+8 (PST)
- ZIP code: 6317
- PSGC: 071208000
- IDD : area code: +63 (0)38
- Native languages: Boholano dialect Cebuano; Tagalog

Bilar, officially the Municipality of Bilar (Cebuano: Munisipalidad sa Bilar; Tagalog: Bayan ng Bilar), is a municipality in the province of Bohol, Philippines. According to the 2024 census, it has a population of 18,877 people.

Bilar is 42 kilometres (26 mi) from Tagbilaran.

Bilar celebrates its fiesta on May 15, to honor the town patron Saint Isidore the Farmer.

== Geography ==
=== Barangays ===
Bilar is politically subdivided into 19 barangays. Each barangay consists of puroks and some have sitios.

PSGC	Barangay	Population			±% p.a.	
		2024		2010		
071208001	Bonifacio	1.4%	260	262	▾	−0.05%
071208002	Bugang Norte	3.3%	632	650	▾	−0.20%
071208003	Bugang Sur	4.9%	918	940	▾	−0.16%
071208004	Cabacnitan (Magsaysay)	4.1%	775	745	▴	0.27%
071208005	Cambigsi	3.3%	618	689	▾	−0.75%
071208006	Campagao	7.1%	1,339	1,284	▴	0.29%
071208007	Cansumbol	6.3%	1,189	1,235	▾	−0.26%
071208008	Dagohoy	4.0%	764	836	▾	−0.62%
071208009	Owac	5.2%	973	975	▾	−0.01%
071208010	Poblacion	8.4%	1,588	1,500	▴	0.40%
071208011	Quezon	3.3%	618	668	▾	−0.54%
071208012	Riverside	5.4%	1,012	886	▴	0.93%
071208013	Rizal	2.3%	425	456	▾	−0.49%
071208014	Roxas	6.1%	1,159	1,011	▴	0.95%
071208015	Subayon	6.9%	1,303	1,200	▴	0.57%
071208016	Villa Aurora	3.9%	737	731	▴	0.06%
071208017	Villa Suerte	1.2%	232	269	▾	−1.02%
071208018	Yanaya	6.8%	1,288	1,123	▴	0.96%
071208019	Zamora	9.3%	1,760	1,638	▴	0.50%
	Total		18,877	17,098	▴	0.69%

=== Climate ===
Climate data for Bilar, Bohol
Month	Jan	Feb	Mar	Apr	May	Jun	Jul	Aug	Sep	Oct	Nov	Dec	Year
Mean daily maximum °C (°F)	27 (81)	27 (81)	28 (82)	30 (86)	29 (84)	28 (82)	28 (82)	28 (82)	28 (82)	27 (81)	27 (81)	27 (81)	28 (82)
Mean daily minimum °C (°F)	21 (70)	21 (70)	21 (70)	22 (72)	23 (73)	23 (73)	23 (73)	23 (73)	23 (73)	22 (72)	22 (72)	21 (70)	22 (72)
Average precipitation mm (inches)	102 (4.0)	85 (3.3)	91 (3.6)	75 (3.0)	110 (4.3)	141 (5.6)	121 (4.8)	107 (4.2)	111 (4.4)	144 (5.7)	169 (6.7)	139 (5.5)	1,395 (55.1)
Average rainy days	18.6	14.8	16.5	16.7	23.9	26.4	25.6	24.1	24.4	26.3	23.7	20.5	261.5
Source: Meteoblue (modeled/calculated data, not measured locally)

== Demographics ==
Population census of Bilar

Year	Pop.	±% p.a.
1903	8,103	—
1918	6,265	−1.70%
1939	8,667	+1.56%
1948	9,701	+1.26%
1960	9,930	+0.19%
1970	11,154	+1.17%

Year	Pop.	±% p.a.
1975	12,226	+1.86%
1980	12,715	+0.79%
1990	14,926	+1.62%
1995	16,029	+1.34%
2000	16,628	+0.79%
2007	17,078	+0.37%

Year	Pop.	±% p.a.
2010	17,098	+0.04%
2015	17,590	+0.54%
2020	18,512	+1.08%
2024	18,877	+0.47%

Source: Philippine Statistics Authority

== Economy ==
Poverty incidence of Bilar (%)

Source: Philippine Statistics Authority

== Tourism ==
- Bilar Man-made Mahogany Forest
- Bilar Rice Terraces
- Bohol Biodiversity Center
- Habitat Butterflies Conservation Center
- San Isidro Labrador Parish Church
- Bilar Hill Park
- Logarita Falls
- Tinugdan Spring
- Pangas Falls

== Gallery ==
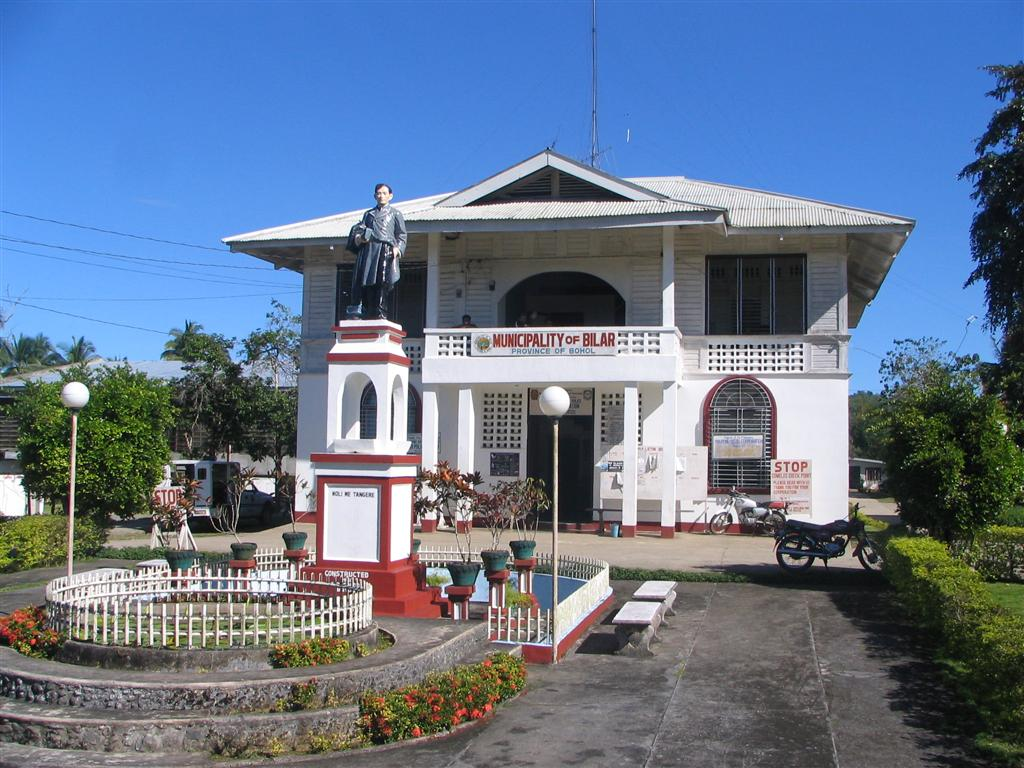
Bilar Municipal Building

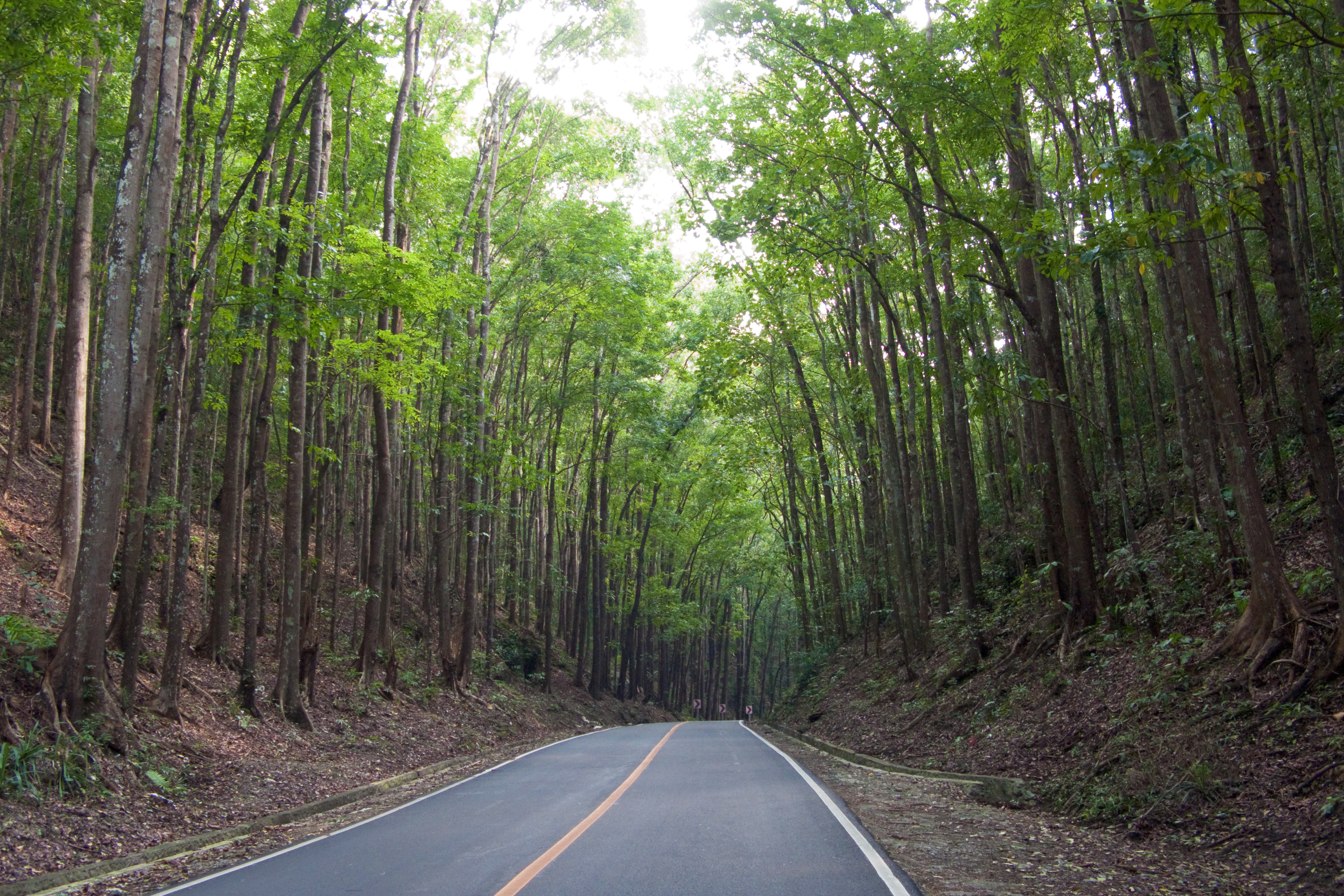
Road through the Rajah Sikatuna Protected Landscape (Man-made forest) in Bilar

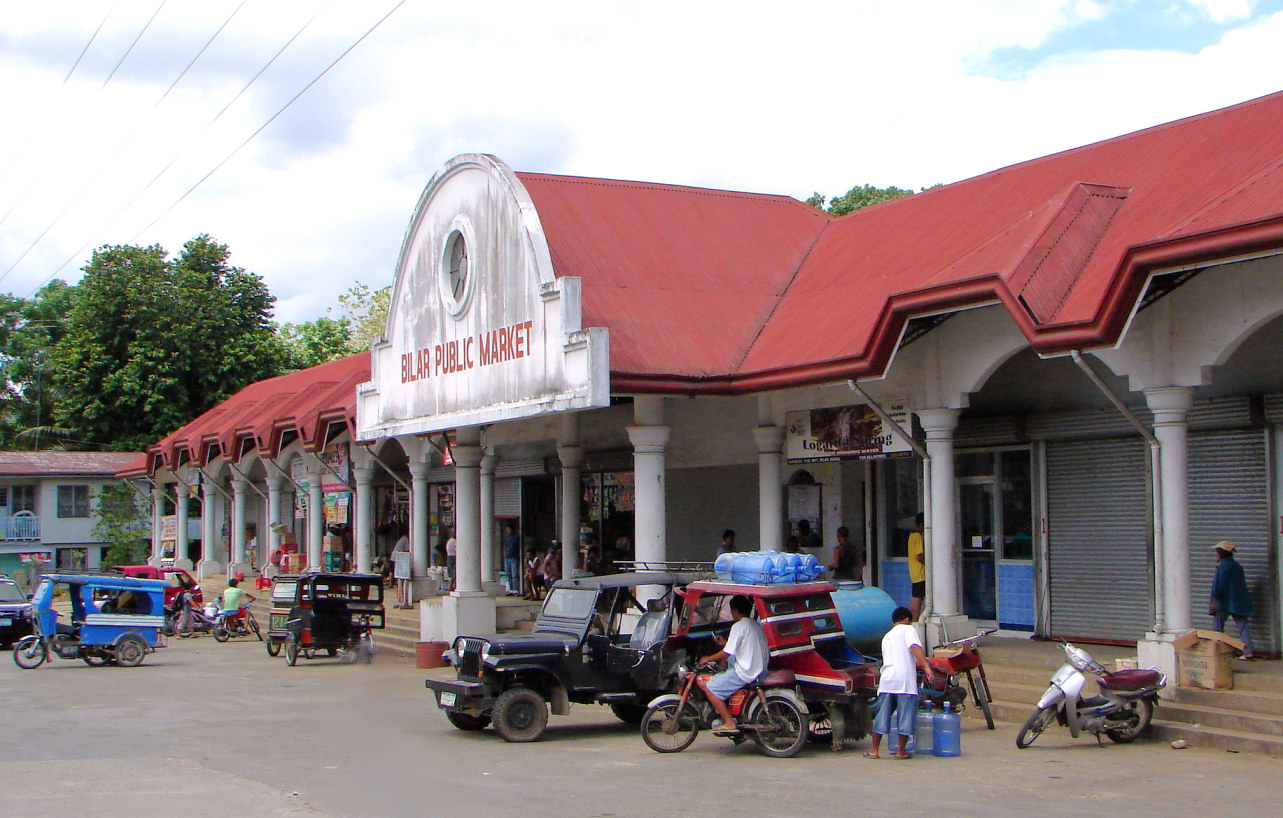
Public market

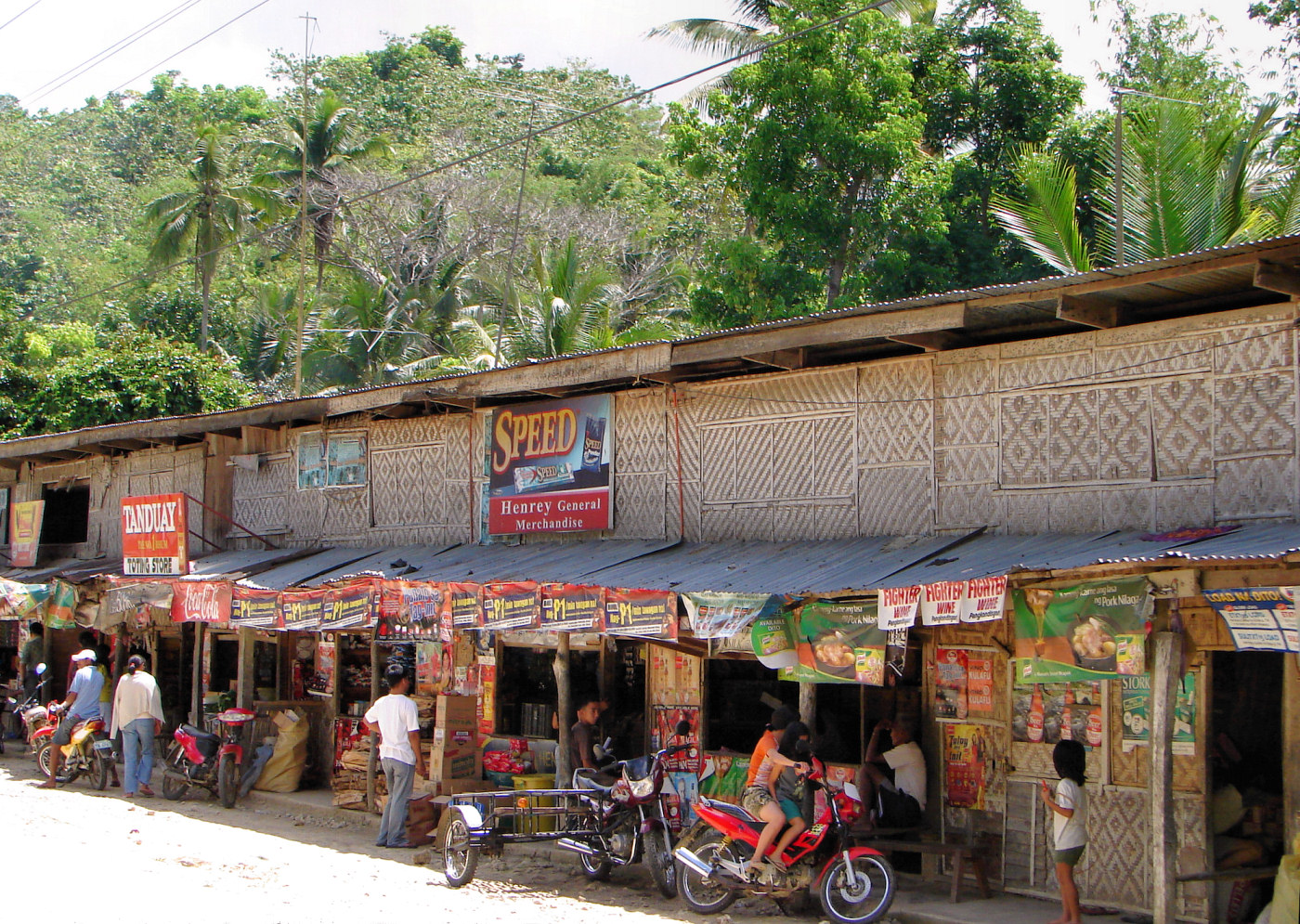
Sari-sari stores
