= List of radio stations in Central Visayas =

Here is the list of radio stations in the Central Visayas region:

== Bohol ==
=== AM Stations ===
Frequency	Branding	Company	Format	Callsign	Power	Location
1116 kHz	Tagbilaran Radio	Community Media Network (Tagbilaran Bctg. Corp.)	Community radio, Public service	DYTR	5 kW	Tagbilaran
1161 kHz	DYRD 1161	Bohol Chronicle Radio Corp.	News, Public affairs, Talk, Religion	DYRD	5 kW	Tagbilaran
1683 kHz	VeriCast Media Channel	Veritas Media Arts, Inc.	News, Public affairs, Religious	DYVM	1 kW	Tagbilaran

=== FM Stations ===
Frequency	Branding	Company	Format	Callsign	Power	Location
88.7 MHz (Note: Off the air as an AM/FM radio station.)	Big Radio Tagbilaran	Vanguard Radio Network	Adult Contemporary, Pop, OPM	DYVA	1 kW	Tagbilaran
88.9 MHz	Lion FM	—N/a	Christian Radio, Religious	—N/a	1 kW	Tubigon
89.3 MHz	MRGV FM Tubigon	—N/a	Contemporary MOR, Talk	—N/a	1 kW	Tubigon
89.9 MHz	Beat FM San Miguel	—N/a	—N/a	—N/a	1 kW	San Miguel
90.1 MHz	Radyo ni Sano (Note: Operating through an internet/streaming radio station at the moment.)	—N/a	News, Talk, Music	—N/a	1 kW	Guindulman
90.3 MHz	Radyo Bandera Bohol	Bandera News Philippines	Contemporary MOR, News Talk, OPM	—N/a	1 kW	Talibon
91.1 MHz	Balita FM	Community Media Network, Inc.	Contemporary MOR, OPM, News	DYTR-FM	2 kW	Tagbilaran
92.7 MHz	Bee FM	Vimcontu Broadcasting Corporation (operated by Groove Deejayz Entertainment Solutions)	Pop, Contemporary MOR	DYII	5 kW	Tagbilaran
92.9 MHz	Infinite Radio Bohol	St. Jude Thaddeus Institute of Technology	Contemporary MOR, OPM	DYAU	1 kW	Jagna
93.5 MHz	Hot FM Tubigon	Iddes Broadcast Group	Contemporary MOR, Top 40, OPM	—N/a	5 kW	Tubigon
94.3 MHz	Radio Bit Bohol	PEC Broadcasting Corporation	Music	DYDL	1 kW	Carmen
95.1 MHz	Radyo Bol-anon Carmen	—N/a	Community Radio	—N/a	1 kW	Carmen
95.9 MHz	Radyo Merkado	—N/a	Contemporary MOR, Pop	—N/a	1 kW	Jagna
98.1 MHz	Radyo Natin Jagna	Manila Broadcasting Company	Music, Community Radio	DYAL/DYNJ	1 kW	Jagna
99.9 MHz	Radyo Guindulman	Local Government of Guindulman, Bohol	Contemporary MOR, News OPM Talk	DYRG	1 kW	Guindulman
100.9 MHz	Radyo Jagna	Mediascape, Inc. (operated by Radyo Bol-anon Network)	Contemporary MOR, News, Talk	DYMA	1 kW	Jagna
101.5 MHz	Life FM Bohol	—N/a	Christian Radio, Religious	DYRJ	1 kW	Tagbilaran
102.1 MHz	Kiss FM Bohol (Repeater)	Bohol Chronicle Radio	Contemporary MOR, OPM, Pop	DYRD-FM	1 kW	Jagna
102.3 MHz	Kiss FM Bohol	Bohol Chronicle Radio	Contemporary MOR, OPM, Pop	DYRD-FM	1 kW	Tagbilaran
103.1 MHz	Radyo Natin Ubay	Manila Broadcasting Company	Music, Community Radio	DYZT	1 kW	Ubay
105.5 MHz	Vibe 105.5	Veritas Media Arts, Inc.	Talk, OPM, Pop	DYVM	1 kW	Tagbilaran
106.5 MHz	JRFM	Holy Name University	Community Radio	DYJR	1 kW	Tagbilaran
106.9 MHz	Anchor Radio Bohol	Bible Baptist Church	Religious	—N/a	5 kW	Dauis

== TBD (To Be Determined) ==
=== AM/FM Stations ===
Frequency	Remarks	Location
102.1 MHz	Kiss FM Bohol Repeater	Jagna
102.3 MHz	Kiss FM Bohol Repeater	Ubay
