= N850 highway =

Road in the Philippines

Route 850
- Bohol Island Circumferential Road
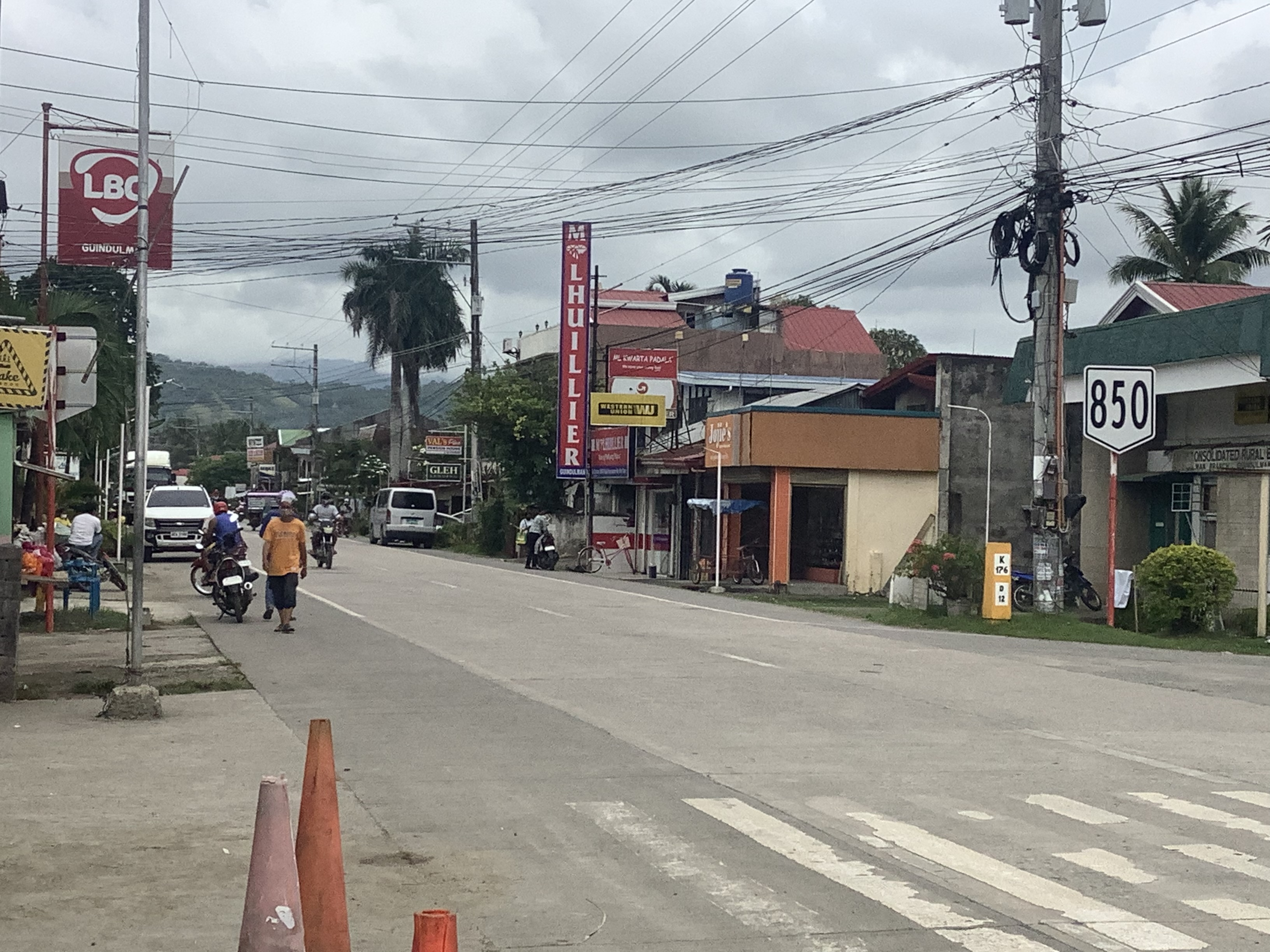
- Reassurance marker of N850 in Guindulman

Route information
- Length: 260.25 km (161.71 mi)
- Component highways: N850 (Tagbilaran North Road) N850 (Tagbilaran East Road)

Major junctions
- Loop around Bohol island
- N853 (Carmen–Sagbayan–Bacani Road) in Clarin; N852 (Loay Interior Road) in Trinidad; N854 (Jagna–Sierra Bullones Road) in Jagna; N851 (Dauis–Panglao Road)

Location
- Country: Philippines
- Provinces: Bohol
- Municipalities: Cortes; Maribojoc; Loon; Calape; Tubigon; Trinidad; Clarin; Inabanga; Buenavista; Getafe; Talibon; Ubay; Alicia; Candijay; Guindulman; Duero; Jagna; Garcia Hernandez; Valencia; Dimiao; Lila; Loay; Alburquerque; Baclayon
- Major cities: Tagbilaran

Highway system
- Roads in the Philippines; Highways; Expressways; List
← N847	→ N851

National Route 850 (N850) is a 260.25 km (161.71 mi), two-four lane (2 x 260), circumferential national secondary route that forms part of the Philippine highway network. The road runs through the entire island of Bohol, mostly along its coastline, connecting numerous ports going to nearby islands, namely in Tagbilaran, Getafe, and in Jagna. The route is composed of Tagbilaran North Road from Tagbilaran to Trinidad, and Tagbilaran East Road from Trinidad to Tagbilaran again.

== Route description ==
=== Tagbilaran to Trinidad ===
The route starts as Tagbilaran North Road, or the Carlos P. Garcia North Avenue from the Old Provincial Capitol of Bohol, now the Bohol National Museum. It passes through the city proper northwards to the state university campus, towards the towns of Cortes, Maribojoc and Loon, where motorists can access Sandingan Island and its barangays thru a spur road. The road continues through the towns of Calape, Tubigon, Clarin, and Inabanga, then heads eastward inland and curves back northward into Buenavista and Getafe and Talibon, where three ports provide access to islands to the north and west of Bohol. The road then goes southward inland towards Trinidad where the segment ends in a three-way intersection with Loay Interior Road, also called the Loay–Trinidad Road, and the Tagbilaran East Road.

=== Trinidad to Tagbilaran ===
The route continues as Tagbilaran East Road after the junction and meets the road towards another port at the town of Bien Unido, then goes east to Ubay, where transport services to Leyte and nearby islands are located. The road heads inland southward to the towns of Alicia, and to Candijay, where a circumferential road going to the southeastern tip of the island is located, to the towns of Guindulman and Anda. The road continues south to the town proper of Guindulman and heads southwest while running beside the coast to Duero and Jagna, where transport services to Camiguin and the island of Mindanao are located. The road continues running along the coast to the towns of Garcia Hernandez, Valencia, Dimiao, and Loay, where the highway running through the island towards Trinidad is located. It continues westward to Alburquerque, Baclayon, and back towards Tagbilaran, where motorists can access the towns of Panglao and Dauis southwest of the city. After reaching Tagbilaran again it ends at the kilometer 0 of the island.

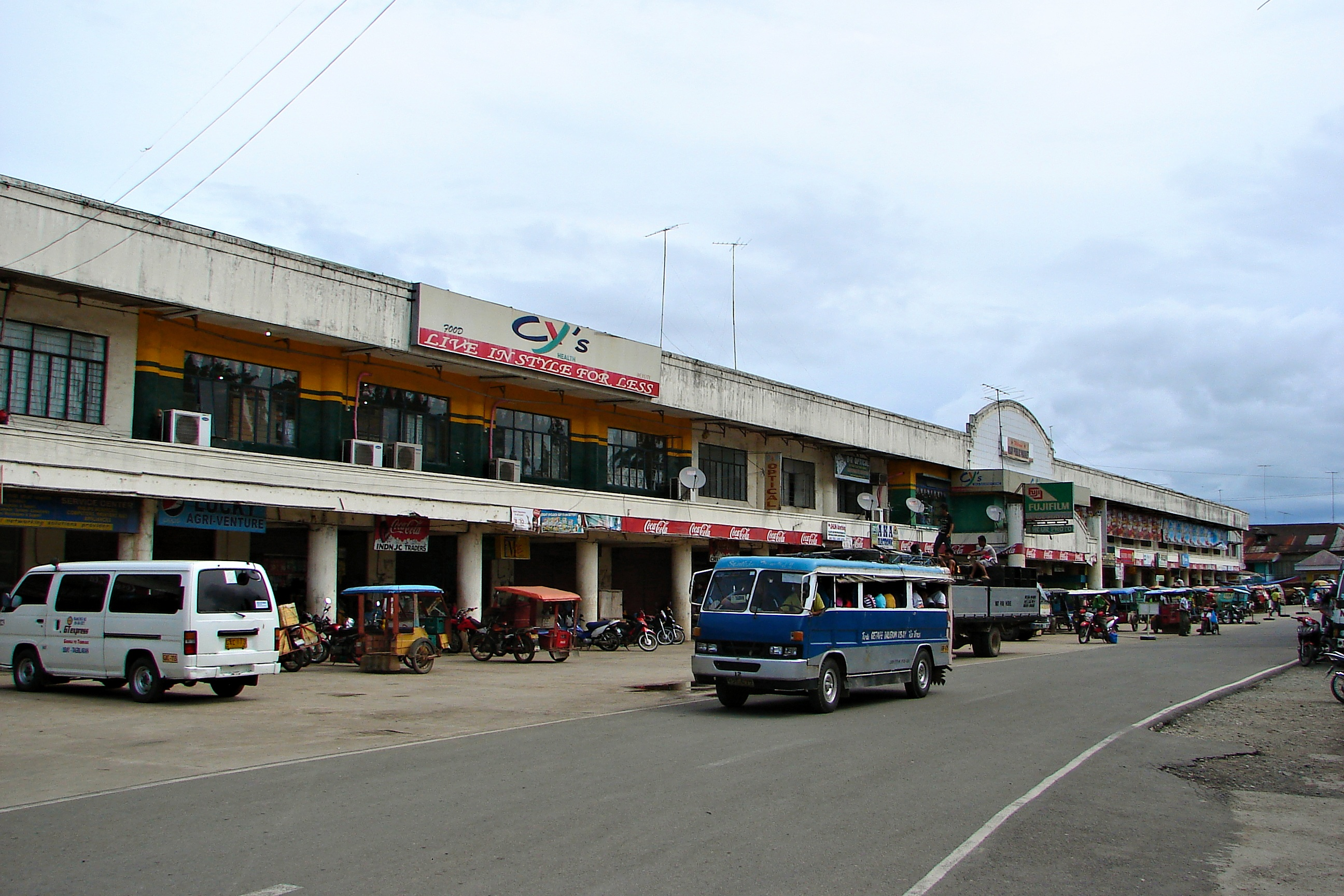
Tagbilaran East Road in Ubay.

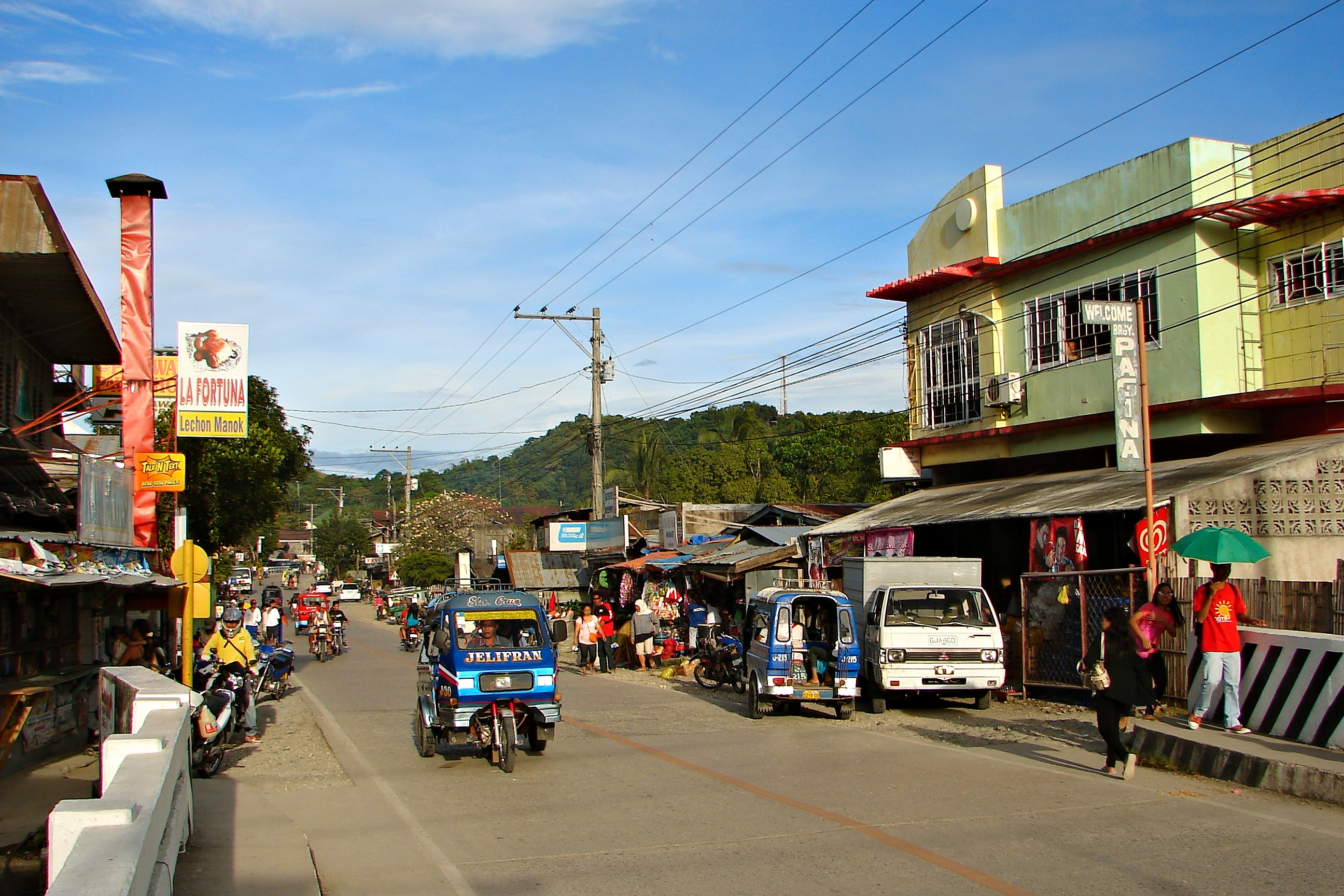
Tagbilaran East Road, a component of N850 in Jagna.

== Intersections ==
The entire route is located in Bohol. Intersections are numbered by kilometer post, with the Old Bohol Provincial Capitol in Tagbilaran City designated as kilometer 0.

City/Municipality	km	mi	Destinations	Notes
Tagbilaran			J.S. Torralba Street	
Tagbilaran			Maria Clara Wharf Road – Cagayan de Oro, Cebu City, Dumaguete, Siquijor	Access to Tagbilaran Wharf, which provides access to major destinations like Dumaguete, Siquijor via Larena, Cebu City, and Cagayan de Oro.
Tagbilaran			Tamblot Circumferential Road	Northern end of circumferential road.
Tagbilaran			Benigno Aquino Street / Calceta Street	
Tagbilaran			Peñaflor Street	
Tagbilaran			Santo Niño Street	
Tagbilaran			Pacifico Castillo Road	
Tagbilaran			Taloto–Ubujan Road	
Tagbilaran			Francisco Dagohoy Circumferential Road	
Cortes			Lapaz–Lourdes–Cortes–Cabaguhan–Corella Road – Corella	
Cortes			Cortes–Balilihan–Catigbian–Macaas Road – Balilihan, Catigbian, Tubigon, Clarin	Southern end of road.
Maribojoc			Maribojoc–Antequera–Catagbacan Road – Antequera, San Isidro, Loon	Southern end of road.
Loon			Maribojoc–Pagnitoan–Candavid–Tabuan–Basak Road	
Loon			Tajang–Sandigan Island Road	Access to Sandingan Island in Looc; boat access to Cabilao Island at the pier in Mocpoc.
Loon			Maribojoc–Antequera–Catagbacan Road – Antequera, San Isidro, Maribojoc	Northern end of road.
Loon			Catagbacan Port Road – Argao	Access to Catagbacan Port.
Calape			Pangangan Island Causeway	
Calape			Cahayag–Cabanugan–Catigbian Road – San Isidro, Catigbian	
Tubigon			Tubigon Port Road – Cebu City	Access to Tubigon Lighthouse and Port.
Tubigon			Cortes–Balilihan–Catigbian–Macaas Road – Balilihan, Catigbian, Cortes	Northern end of road.
Clarin			Poblacion Sur–Bontud Road / Clarin Pier Road	Access to Clarin Port.
Clarin			N853 (Carmen–Sagbayan–Bacani Road) – Sagbayan, Carmen	
Inabanga			Dagnawan–Dagohoy Farm-to-Market Road	
Inabanga			Lapacan Sur–Magkaya–Panghaban Road	
Buenavista			M. Leopando Street	Buenavista town proper.
Buenavista			M. Torregosa Street	Buenavista town proper.
Getafe			Camacho Street / B. Daria Street – Cebu City, Cordova	Access to Getafe port. Boat access to Jandayan Island and Cebu.
Getafe			Buenavista–Carmen–Danao–Getafe Road – Danao, Carmen	
Talibon			Carlos P. Garcia Avenue – Cebu City	Talibon town proper. Access to Talibon Port.
Trinidad			N852 (Loay–Trinidad Road) – Dagohoy, Carmen, Loay	End of Tagbilaran North Road segment. Start of Tagbilaran East Road segment.
Trinidad			Trinidad–Bien Unido Road – Bien Unido	
Ubay			Ubay Diversion Road	Bypasses Ubay town proper. North end of diversion road.
Ubay			Tan Nene Street / Ramon Gaviola Street	Both roads are one way roads; no left turn towards Ubay Port.
Ubay			Col. Marciano Garces Street	
Ubay			Tan Unga Street – Bato, Hilongos	One way road towards Tan Unga Street. Access to Ubay Port.
Ubay			E. Boyles Street / Ubay–Biabas Road	Access to Tapal Wharf.
Ubay			Ubay Diversion Road	South end of diversion road.
Ubay			Gabi–Bayongan–Camanaga Road – San Miguel	
Alicia			Dal-an–Carmen–Sierra Bullones–Pilar–Alicia Road – Sierra Bullones, Carmen, Pilar	
Candijay			La Union–Mabini–Ubay Road – Ubay, Mabini	
Candijay			Candijay–Cogtong–Anda–Guindulman Road – Anda, Guindulman	Circumferential road spanning the southeast corner of the island.
Candijay			Tugas–Casbu Road – Guindulman	Access to Guindulman town proper.
Guindulman			Guioang–Cogtong Road	
Guindulman			Candijay–Cogtong–Anda–Guindulman Road – Anda, Candijay	Circumferential road spanning the southeast corner of the island.
Guindulman			Tugas–Casbu Road – Candijay	
Guindulman			Cabantian–Cansiwang–Mayuga Road	
Duero			San Pedro–Angilan–Bangwalog Road	
Jagna			Jagna–Cabungaan–Lonoy Road	
Jagna			N854 (Jagna–Sierra Bullones Road) / Jagna Wharf Road – Sierra Bullones, Carmen, Cagayan de Oro, Camiguin	Access to Camiguin province and Mindanao via Nasipit and Cagayan de Oro ferries.
Garcia Hernandez			Canayaon–Roxas–Tabuan–Datag Road	
Valencia			Canmanico–Anonang Road	
Dimiao			Luyo–Bakilid–Datag Road	
Dimiao			Balbalan–Guindaguitan–Pagsa Road	
Lila			Tiguis–Calvario–Cambanse–Alegria Road	
Loay			N852 (Loay–Trinidad Road) – Dagohoy, Carmen, Trinidad	
Loay			Hinawanan–Concepcion Road – Loboc	Backroad towards Loboc town.
Alburquerque			Alburquerque–Sikatuna Road	
Baclayon			A. Aya-ay Street	Baclayon town proper.
Baclayon			Quezon Street	
Tagbilaran			A. Pahang Street	
Tagbilaran			N851 (Dauis–Panglao Road) – Panglao, Dauis	Access to Panglao Island and Bohol–Panglao International Airport via Jacinto Borja Bridge.
Tagbilaran			Mansasa–Dampas Road	
Tagbilaran			Tamblot Circumferential Road	Southern end of circumferential road.
Tagbilaran			Del Rosario Street	
Tagbilaran			J.A. Clarin Street – Dauis, Panglao	Access to Panglao Island via Ambassador Suarez Bridge.
Tagbilaran			Sarmiento Street	
Tagbilaran			J.A. Clarin Street / Carlos P. Garcia Avenue	Route follows Carlos P. Garcia Avenue west towards Old Bohol Provincial Capitol.
1.000 mi = 1.609 km; 1.000 km = 0.621 mi: Incomplete access; Route transition

== Incidents ==
- This highway had many bridges and sections of Tagbilaran North Road and Tagbilaran East Road damaged during the 2013 Bohol earthquake. A few bridges were reconstructed with the Mabey Compact 200.
- On April 27, 2022, the old bridge over the Loboc River in Loay collapsed, killing 4 people and injuring 15. The bridge was damaged during the 2013 earthquake and still being used while a new replacement bridge was under construction next to it. One possible cause was the stationary traffic on the bridge that exceeded its capacity.
