= DYRD =

DYRD may refer to both stations owned by Bohol Chronicle Radio Corporation:

- DYRD-AM (1161 AM)
- DYRD-FM (102.3 FM), branded as 102.3 Kiss FM
