= Loay Interior Road =

Road in the Philippines

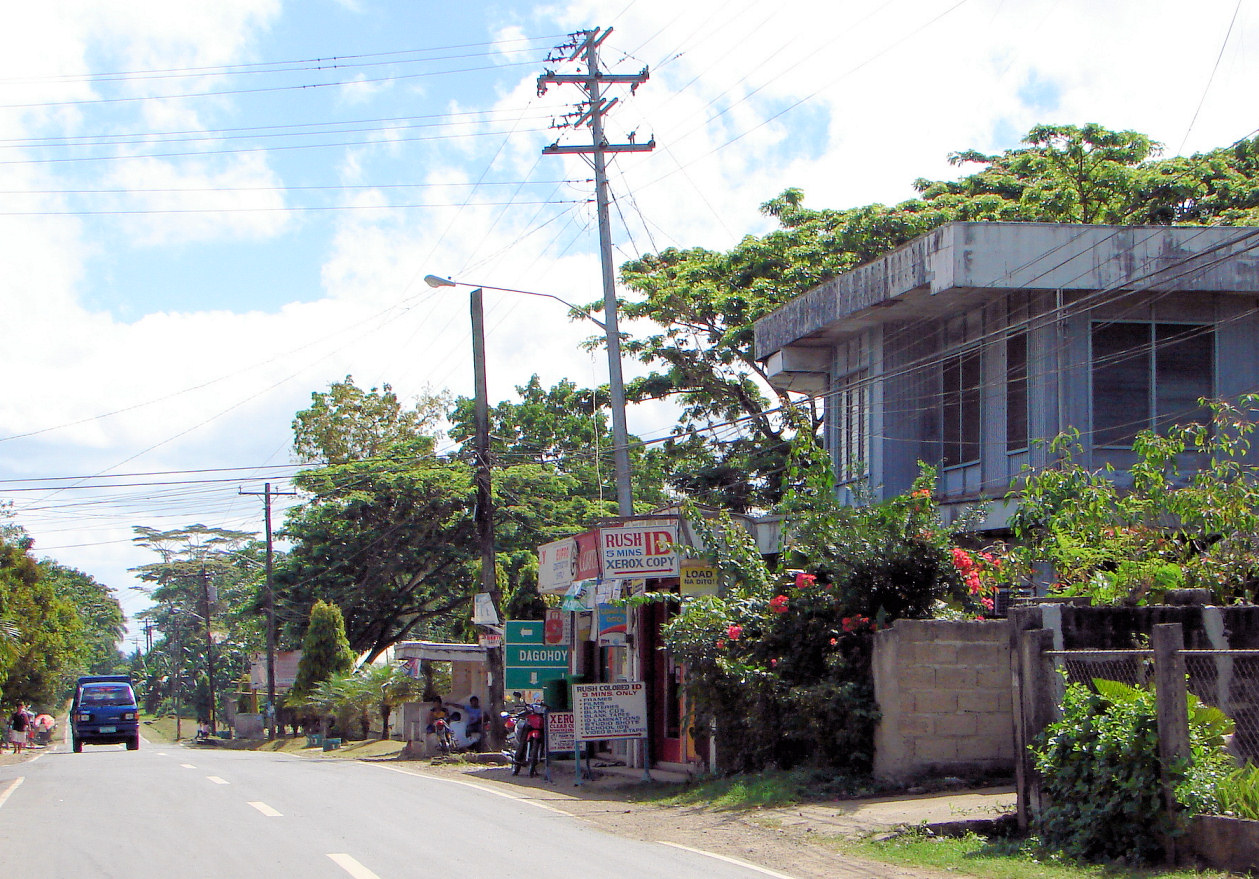
- The road in Carmen

Route information
- Maintained by Department of Public Works and Highways (DPWH)
- Length: 78.92 km (49.04 mi)
- Component highways: N852

Major junctions
- From: N850 (Tagbilaran East Road) in Loay
- N853 (Carmen−Sagbayan−Bacani Road) in Carmen: N854 (Dat-an−Carmen−Sierra Bullones−Pilar−Alicia Road) in Carmen; N855 (Buenavista–Carmen–Danao–Getafe Road) in Carmen
- To: N850 (Tagbilaran North Road) in Trinidad

Location
- Country: Philippines
- Provinces: Bohol
- Municipalities: Loay, Loboc, Bilar Batuan, Carmen, Dagohoy, San Miguel, Trinidad

Highway system
- Roads in the Philippines; Highways; Expressways; List
← N851	→ N853

The Loay Interior Road is a 78.92-kilometer (49.04 mi), two lane national secondary road that connects the municipality of Loay to the municipality of Trinidad in Bohol, Philippines. This highway serves as one of the principal gateways to Carmen, which is known for being the main location and tourist spot of the Chocolate Hills.

The entire highway is designated as National Route 852 (N852) of Philippine highway network.

== History ==
This road was designated as National Route 852 (N852) of the Philippine highway network by the Department of Public Works and Highways.

== Route description ==
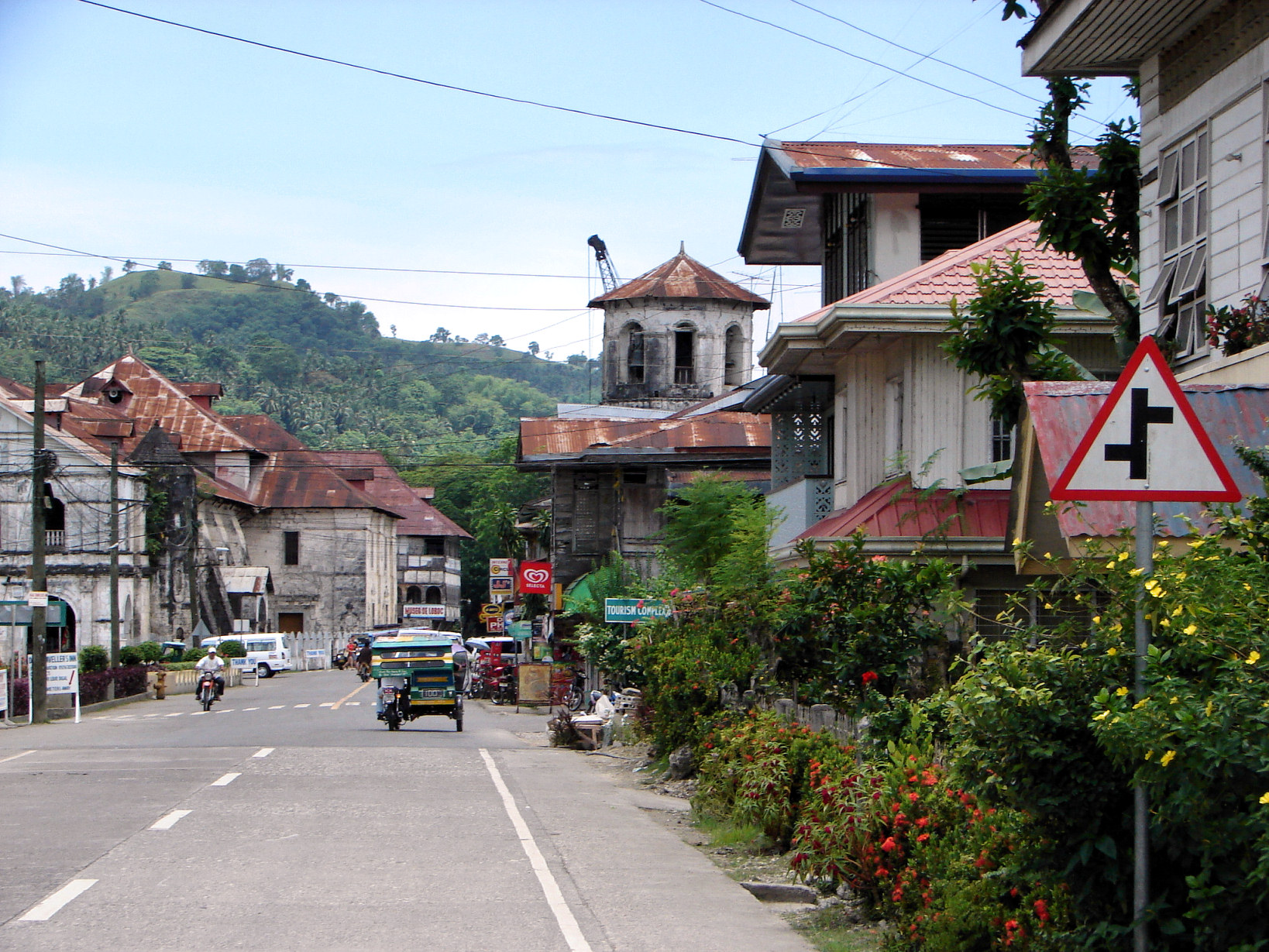
The Loay Interior Road in Loboc.

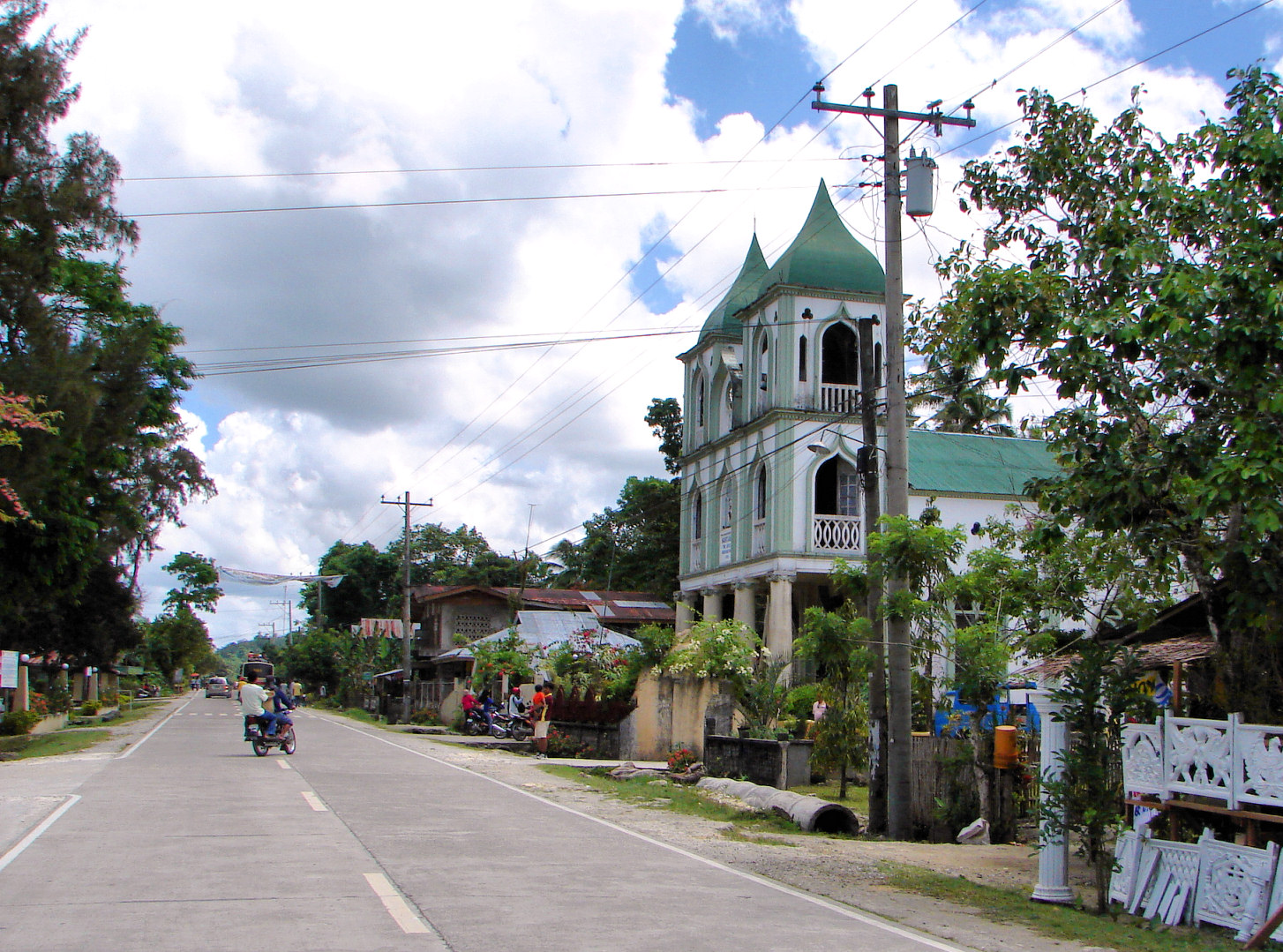
The road in Batuan.

The route starts in Loay, as a junction from Tagbilaran East Road. It traverses to Loboc, Bilar and Batuan. The road reaches Carmen and makes junctions of Carmen−Sagbayan−Bacani Road (N853), Dat-an−Carmen−Sierra Bullones–Pilar–Alicia Road (N854), and Buenavista–Carmen–Danao–Getafe Road (N855) respectively. The highway traverses to Dagohoy and San Miguel. After reaching Trinidad, the road ends at a Three-way intersection of Tagbilaran North Road and Tagbilaran East Road.

== Incidents ==
- This highway was one of the roads in Bohol to suffer from the 2013 Bohol earthquake, specifically in the Loboc section. Tourist destinations were damaged along with the town's main church.
- Typhoon Seniang damaged many lunch cruise boats.
