= DXGL-TV =

Butuan; Philippines
- Channels: Analog: 13 (VHF)
- Branding: Real Radio Teleradyo

Programming
- Affiliations: Independent

Ownership
- Owner: PEC Broadcasting Corporation

History
- Founded: 1994
- Former affiliations: ABC/TV5 (1994-2015)

Technical information
- ERP: 5 kW

DXGL-TV (Channel 13) is a television station of PEC Broadcasting Corporation in Butuan and was formerly affiliated with ABC (now TV5 and formerly 5) from 1994 until 2015. Its studios and transmitters are located at PECBC Complex, Brgy Imadejas, Butuan. This station is currently inactive since 2019.

== See also ==
- TV5 (Philippine TV network) (TV5)
