= DXPE =

Philippine radio station

Nice FM (DXPE)
Kidapawan; Philippines
- Broadcast area: Eastern Cotabato and surrounding areas
- Frequency: 91.9 MHz
- Branding: 91.9 Nice FM

Programming
- Languages: Cebuano, Filipino
- Format: Contemporary MOR, OPM, Talk

Ownership
- Owner: PEC Broadcasting Corporation

History
- First air date: 2015
- Call sign meaning: Philippine Electronics and Communication

Technical information
- Licensing authority: NTC
- Power: 5,000 watts

DXPE (91.9 FM), broadcasting as 91.9 Nice FM, is a radio station owned and operated by PEC Broadcasting Corporation. The station's studio and Transmitter are located along Daang Maharlika, Kidapawan.
