= DXVS =

Radio station in Lanao del Norte, Philippines

Lite FM (DXVS)
- Lala; Philippines
- Broadcast area: Western Lanao del Norte, parts of Misamis Occidental and Zamboanga del Sur
- Frequency: 107.7 MHz
- Branding: 107.7 Lite FM

Programming
- Languages: English, Cebuano, Filipino
- Format: Soft AC, Talk

Ownership
- Owner: PEC Broadcasting Corporation

History
- First air date: January 6, 2000

Technical information
- Licensing authority: NTC
- Power: 1 kW
- ERP: 5 kW

Links
- Webcast: Listen Live
- Website: dxvl.lite107fm.com

107.7 Lite FM (DXVS 107.7 MHz) is an FM station owned and operated by PEC Broadcasting Corporation. Its studios and transmitter are located at Brgy. Maranding, Lala, Lanao del Norte.
