= DWPY =

Pasalingaya FM (DWPY)
- Casiguran, Sorsogon; Philippines
- Broadcast area: Sorsogon and surrounding areas
- Frequency: 88.1 MHz
- Branding: Pasalingaya 88.1

Programming
- Languages: Bicolano, Filipino
- Format: Community Radio

Ownership
- Owner: PEC Broadcasting Corporation
- Operator: Pasalinggaya Media Network

History
- First air date: December 25, 2017
- Call sign meaning: Pasalingaya

Technical information
- Licensing authority: NTC
- Power: 5 kW

Pasalingaya 88.1 (DWPY 88.1 MHz) is an FM radio station owned by PEC Broadcasting Corporation and operated by Pasalinggaya Media Network. Its studios and transmitter are located at Store #15, Casiguran Plaza Market, M.C. Escudero St., Brgy. Central, Casiguran, Sorsogon.
