= Anda, Bohol =

Municipality in Bohol, Philippines

Anda
- Municipality
- Municipality of Anda
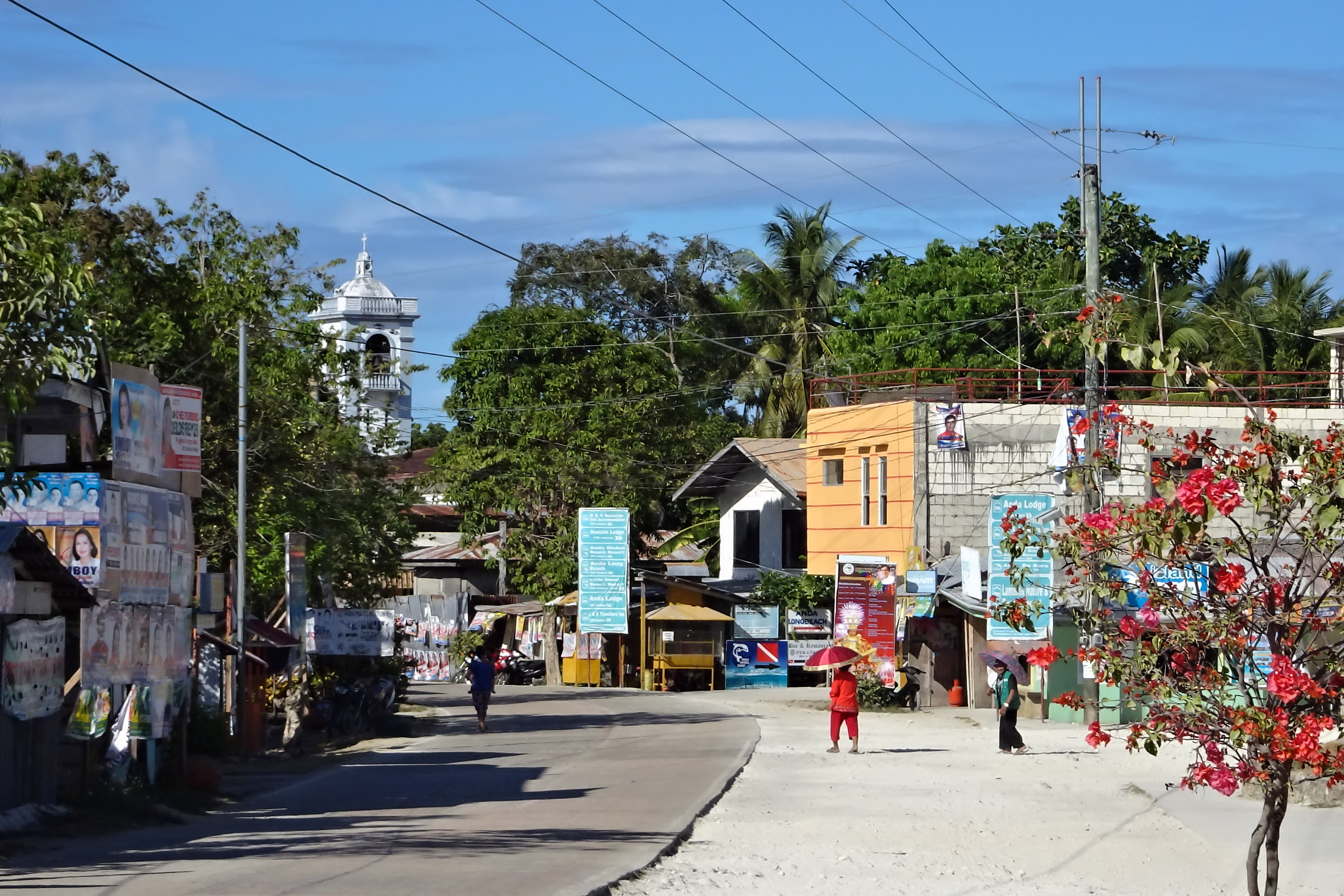
- Poblacion of Anda

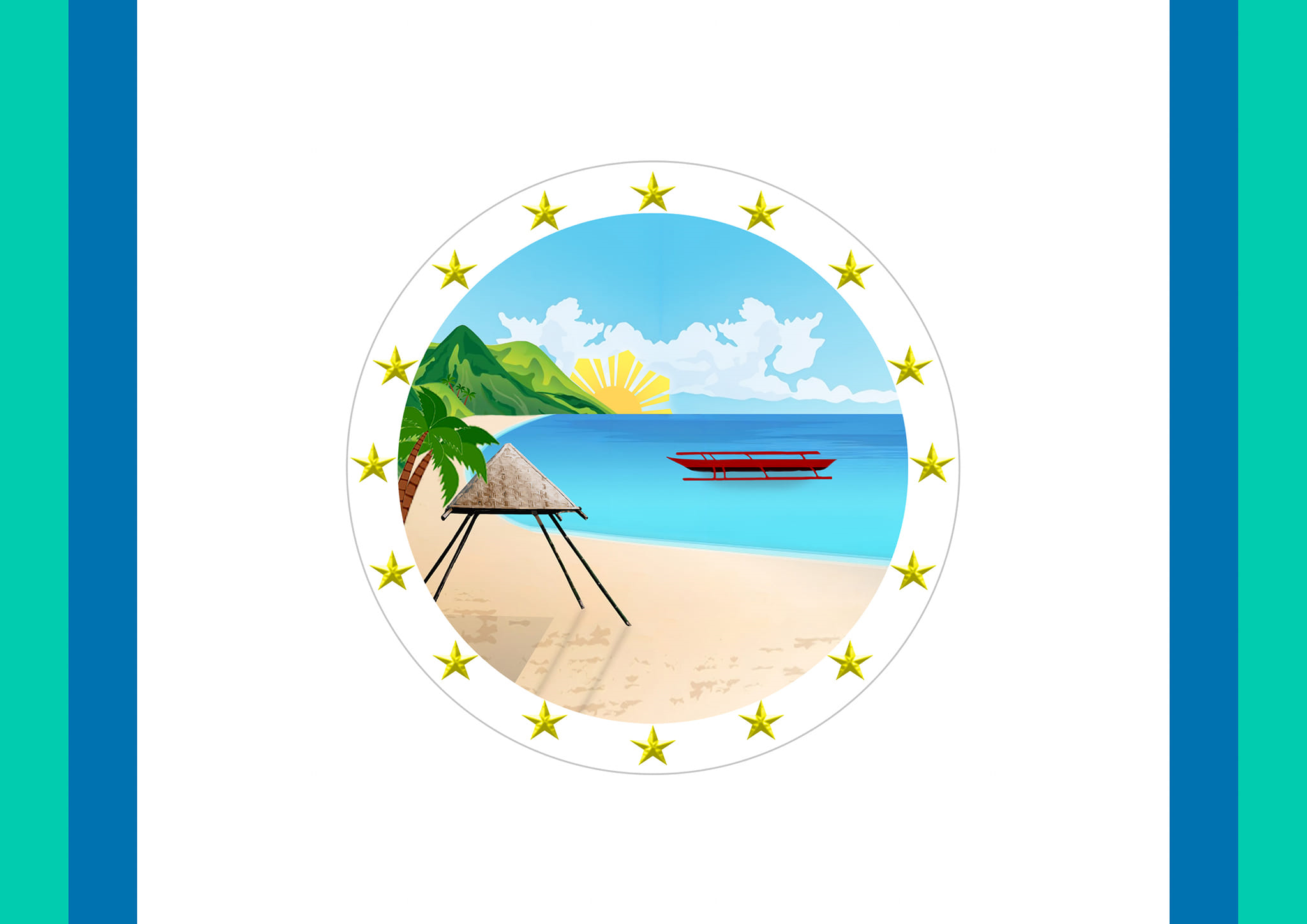
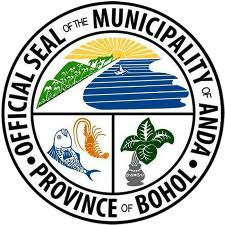
- Flag Seal

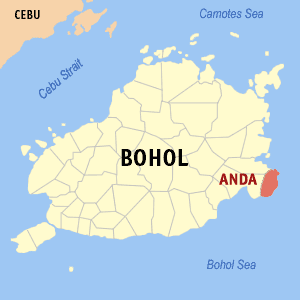
- Map of Bohol with Anda highlighted
- Interactive map of Anda
- Location within the Philippines
- Coordinates: 9°44′38″N 124°34′34″E
- Country: Philippines
- Region: Central Visayas
- Province: Bohol
- District: 3rd district
- Founded: March 12, 1875
- Named for: Simón de Anda y Salazar
- Barangays: 16 (see Barangays)

Government
  - Type: Sangguniang Bayan
  - Mayor: Angelina B. Simacio
  - Vice Mayor: Rubena C. Porter
  - Representative: Kristine Alexie B. Tutor
  - Municipal Council: Members: Fredneil A. Bersabal; Ma. Aura Amper-Loquias; Absalon T. Deloy; Jocelyn T. Amplayo; Dolores S. Amora; John Louis C. Deligero; Fidel A. Castrodes; Joselito B. Caslib
  - Electorate: 13,774 voters (2025)

Area
  - Total: 61.89 km^{2} (23.90 sq mi)
- Elevation: 5.8 m (19 ft)
- Highest elevation: 365 m (1,198 ft)
- Lowest elevation: 0 m (0 ft)

Population (2024 census)
  - Total: 17,835
  - Density: 288.2/km^{2} (746.4/sq mi)
  - Households: 4,418

Economy
  - Income class: 4th municipal income class
  - Poverty incidence: 19.42% (2023)
  - Revenue: ₱ 150.2 million (2024)
  - Assets: ₱ 287.1 million (2024)
  - Expenditure: ₱ 69.38 million (2024)
  - Liabilities: ₱ 52.75 million (2024)

Service provider
  - Electricity: Bohol 2 Electric Cooperative (BOHECO 2)
- Time zone: UTC+8 (PST)
- ZIP code: 6311
- PSGC: 0701203000
- IDD : area code: +63 (0)38
- Native languages: Boholano dialect Cebuano; Tagalog
- Website: www.andabohol.gov.ph

Anda, officially the Municipality of Anda (Cebuano: Munisipyo sa Anda; Tagalog: Bayan ng Anda), is a municipality in the province of Bohol, Philippines. According to the 2024 census, it has a population of 17,835 people.

In 2006, the Anda red hermatite print petroglyphs of Bohol were included in the tentative list of the Philippines for UNESCO World Heritage Site under the name of Petroglyphs and Petrographs of the Philippines, which also includes the Singnapan charcoal-drawn petrographs of southern Palawan, Angono Petroglyphs of Rizal province, Alab petroglyphs of Mountain province, and charcoal-drawn Penablanca petrographs of Cagayan.

Anda is 98 kilometres (61 mi) from Tagbilaran.

== Etymology ==
The decree in 1875 on the separation of Quinale from Guindulman did not explain why the name "Anda" was chosen. It was presumed that the name referred to Governor General Simón de Anda y Salazar who was Governor General of the Philippines from 1769 to 1770. Simon de Anda was a member of the Royal Audiencia in the Philippines who did not surrender to the British in 1762. But considering a century gap between de Anda and the time of the town's creation and also taking into account the poor literacy of the populace at that time, the naming of the town after him may not be the case. A more acceptable reason from oral history, is that "Anda" is a reference to the land that moves forward, as in Spanish "el lugar anda" – the land walks or moves. This was a rough attempt to translate "Quinale" into Spanish. The word "quinale" or "gui kale", is a colloquial local term for a pile of sand dunes caused by the waves enhancing a new land mass. Hence, Anda, which means "it walks."

== History ==
=== Prehistory ===
The first inhabitants of the area were migrant Negritos, who were eventually replaced by Austronesians. The new migrants established the red hematite petrographs in the Anda peninsula and would become a sacred site for ethnic communities.

The region of Southeastern Bohol and Anda Peninsula are known as the "cradle of civilization of Bohol" from archaeological findings of pre-colonial, ancient bodies from burial sites which were housed in boat-shaped wooden-coffins. Today, local healers and shaman still practice pagdiwata rituals, or offerings to the spirits for good fortune, located in Lamanok Point in Anda. The wooden boat coffins are estimated to date back 6,000 years ago from the Metal Age to the Protohistoric Period. The National Museum of the Philippines has excavated and recorded 9 local caves for preservation.

Unfortunately, theft and extraction of sacred burial sites of human remains by U.S. universities occurred during the American colonial area, particularly from the University of Michigan and Bucknell University.

=== Ternatean Invasion of Bohol ===
During the first half of the 16th century, the Sultanate of Ternate ransacked the area, along with the communities of western Bohol, specifically, the Dapitan Kingdom. When the Spanish arrived during the later half of the 16th century, the Anda communities were easily subjugated as they have already been ravaged by the Ternate people.

=== Spanish Colonial Period ===
The municipality of Anda was formerly known as Quinale and was a barrio of the municipality of Guindulman from the early part of its civilization up to the later decades of the 19th century. At the onset, Quinale was basically uninhabited with plenty of uncultivated lands and its shores were swampy with many mangroves and hardwood trees.

Through the years the population of Quinale grew and the people sought independence from Guindulman. On 8 July 1856 they petitioned for independence and the petition was endorsed by the Assessor General of the government to the Governor General of the Philippines on 3 September 1856. Yet their petition was denied for the reason that they could not meet the required number of 500 tributes or taxpayers.

Quinale petitioned for the second time to become an independent town on 30 December 1872. The petition was addressed to the Provincial Governor of Bohol and was eventually endorsed by him to the "Consejo de Administracion de Filipinas (Council for Administration of the Philippines), the Provincial Father of the Recollects and the Archbishop of Manila".

The town progressed at the time. Public buildings and the church were improved, and roads were created leading to Guindulman. However, in spite of these developments, the petition was again denied on the grounds that their total taxpayers only reached 400 people.

Still persistent, the people of Quinale again filed their petition on 27 March 1874 which was subsequently declined due to the same reason. A few months later, on 23 September 1874, the people again made another petition but now used a different approach and reasoning.

They were repeatedly denied for the same reason, yet it was indicated that births in the town of Quinale far exceeded the number of deaths, but the people migrated to other places because of lack of supervision and opportunities. To answer this need, the officials wanted their barrio to be made into a town to have proper supervision and leadership. With these, the people would not leave, and the number of taxpayers would've reach 500.

Provincial politico-military governor Don Joaquin Bengoechea (June 1872 – 1878), was amenable to their line of reasoning and suggested that the people make a petition for separation of Quinale in only in the civil aspect as becoming a separate parish required 500 taxpayers. Hence, on 23 September 1874, they only petitioned for becoming a town in the civil aspect.

More than six months passed before the Consejo de Administration finally recommended that Quinale be separated in its civil aspect only. Delay was due to the religious authorities' reluctance to approve it.

Finally on 12 March 1875, the governor general Don Jose de Malcampo y Monje issued the decree creating the new town of Anda and its being separated from the town of Guindulman in civil aspect only, consonant with the desire of the religious authorities. Confirmed by the archbishop of Manila, the order of the separation was published on 1 April 1875.

With this approval, the local officials of the new town of Anda and the mother town of Guindulman gathered to discuss and determine the boundaries of the two towns on 3 May 1875. With the decree, the people were still given the opportunity to till their lands wherever they may be located, in Anda or Guindulman.

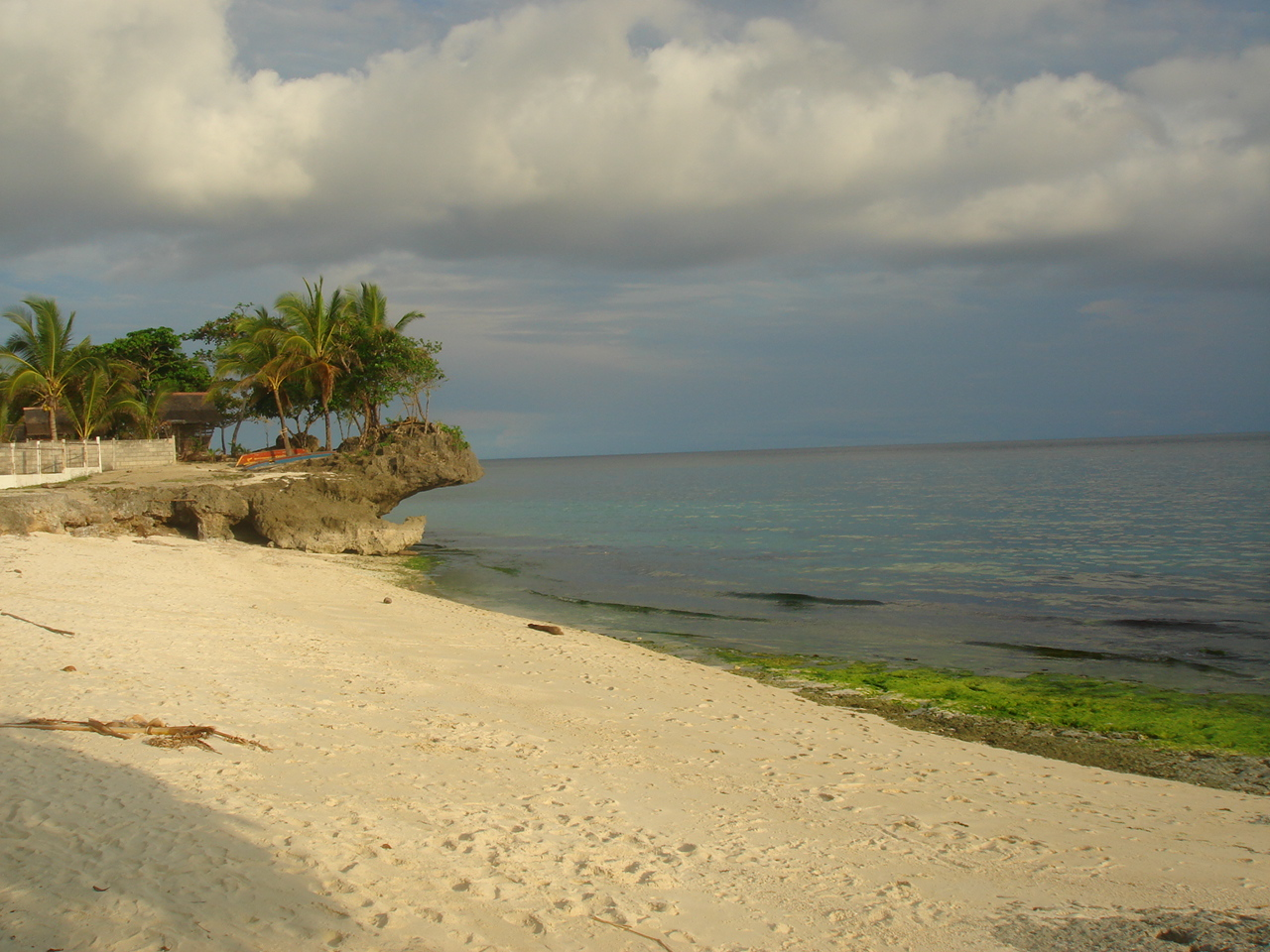
An image of a beach in Anda, Bohol.

As the new town was established with its defined boundaries, a practical concern of the local officials arose as they had no knowledge of running the local government. Hence, they requested an educated person from the mother town of Guindulman to assist the local officials run the local government. That person was Pablo Juliano Castro, an illegitimate son of a Spanish priest in Guindulman who had a privileged education in Manila. He was given a prime lot in the center of the town, near the proposed Municipal Hall and the proposed school building. Pablo Castro not only acted as advisor of the local administration but also acted as the first Justice of Peace and Anda's first schoolteacher. He served sometime later also as the town's "Capitan Municipal" or town's chief executive at the turn of the century.

Subsequent years saw Anda's growth in terms of population. People no longer migrated and eventually the number of taxpayers increased until they were able to qualify to be a separate town in the religious aspect. On 18 July 1885, Anda became an independent parish from Guindulman and become a Diocesan parish on 19 March 1885, dedicated to the Santo Niño or the Holy Child. Royal approval was given on 6 January 1885 and finally implemented on 18 July 1885 with Fr. Julian Cisnero as the first parish priest.

The line of Spanish priests serving the Parish of Anda was not broken from 1885 up to 1937, even after the end of the Spanish regime and through the American era. At the end of the Spanish regime, many Spanish priests fled but not Fr. Hilario Lopez. Even after the American era, priests from the Order of the Augustinian Recollects continued to serve the people until 1937. The last Spanish priest was Fr. Luis Llorente.

== Geography ==
=== Barangays ===
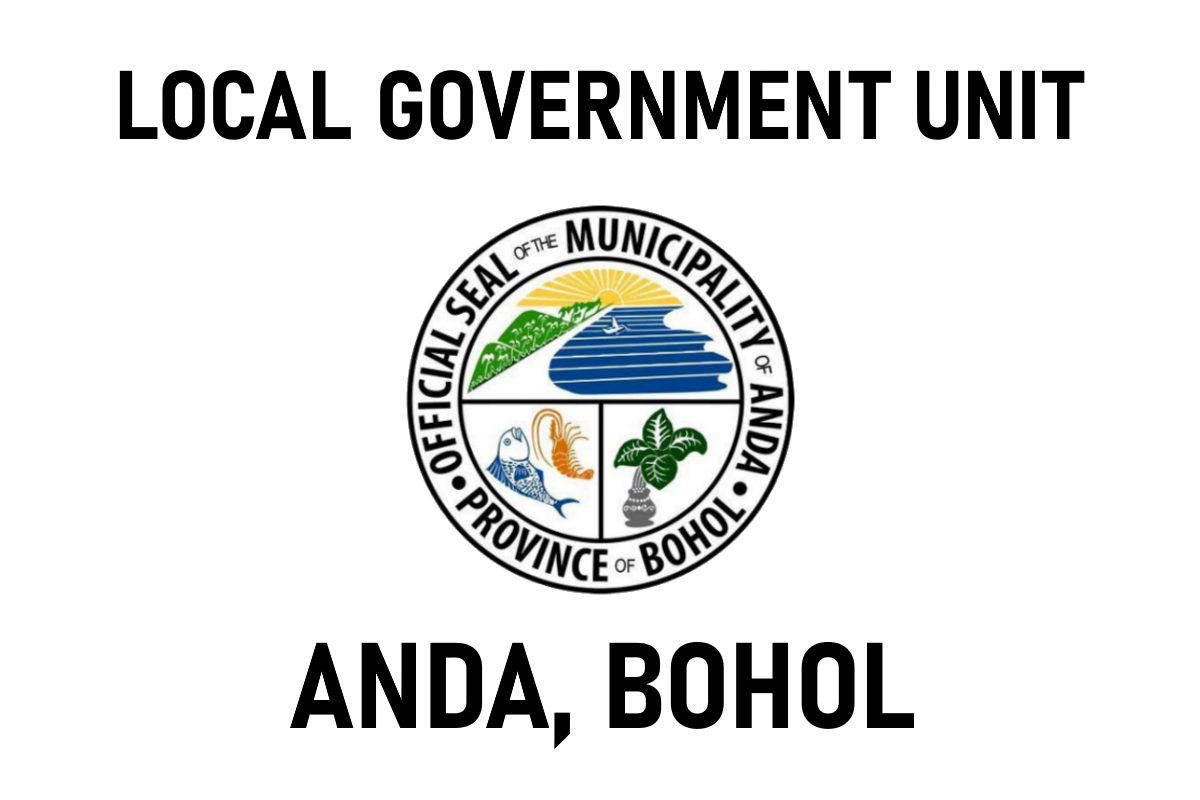
Former flag of Anda, used until 2024.

Anda is politically subdivided into 16 barangays. Each barangay consists of puroks and some have sitios.

PSGC	Barangay	Population			±% p.a.	
		2024		2010		
071203001	Almaria	2.1%	370	392	▾	−0.40%
071203002	Bacong	13.0%	2,323	2,289	▴	0.10%
071203003	Badiang	7.2%	1,281	1,277	▴	0.02%
071203004	Buenasuerte	1.8%	321	398	▾	−1.49%
071203005	Candabong	12.3%	2,193	2,297	▾	−0.32%
071203006	Casica	2.6%	464	406	▴	0.93%
071203007	Katipunan	2.6%	467	503	▾	−0.52%
071203008	Linawan	5.1%	918	987	▾	−0.50%
071203009	Lundag	5.5%	980	1,029	▾	−0.34%
071203010	Poblacion	7.4%	1,312	1,295	▴	0.09%
071203011	Santa Cruz	6.0%	1,073	1,123	▾	−0.32%
071203012	Suba	6.2%	1,103	1,125	▾	−0.14%
071203013	Talisay	5.2%	936	1,048	▾	−0.78%
071203014	Tanod	2.4%	421	487	▾	−1.01%
071203015	Tawid	4.4%	789	825	▾	−0.31%
071203016	Virgen	8.5%	1,512	1,428	▴	0.40%
	Total		17,835	16,909	▴	0.37%

=== Climate ===
Climate data for Anda, Bohol
Month	Jan	Feb	Mar	Apr	May	Jun	Jul	Aug	Sep	Oct	Nov	Dec	Year
Mean daily maximum °C (°F)	28 (82)	29 (84)	30 (86)	31 (88)	31 (88)	30 (86)	30 (86)	30 (86)	30 (86)	29 (84)	29 (84)	29 (84)	30 (85)
Mean daily minimum °C (°F)	23 (73)	22 (72)	23 (73)	23 (73)	24 (75)	25 (77)	24 (75)	24 (75)	24 (75)	24 (75)	23 (73)	23 (73)	24 (74)
Average precipitation mm (inches)	102 (4.0)	85 (3.3)	91 (3.6)	75 (3.0)	110 (4.3)	141 (5.6)	121 (4.8)	107 (4.2)	111 (4.4)	144 (5.7)	169 (6.7)	139 (5.5)	1,395 (55.1)
Average rainy days	18.6	14.8	16.5	16.7	23.9	26.4	25.6	24.1	24.4	26.3	23.7	20.5	261.5
Source: Meteoblue (modeled/calculated data, not measured locally)

== Demographics ==
Population census of Anda

Year	Pop.	±% p.a.
1903	4,938	—
1918	6,712	+2.07%
1939	9,751	+1.79%
1948	11,688	+2.03%
1960	11,730	+0.03%
1970	12,535	+0.67%
1975	12,658	+0.20%
1980	12,625	−0.05%

Year	Pop.	±% p.a.
1990	13,497	+0.67%
1995	16,108	+3.37%
2000	17,863	+2.24%
2007	16,616	−0.99%
2010	16,909	+0.64%
2015	16,462	−0.51%
2020	17,778	+1.63%
2024	17,835	+0.08%

Source: Philippine Statistics Authority

== Economy ==
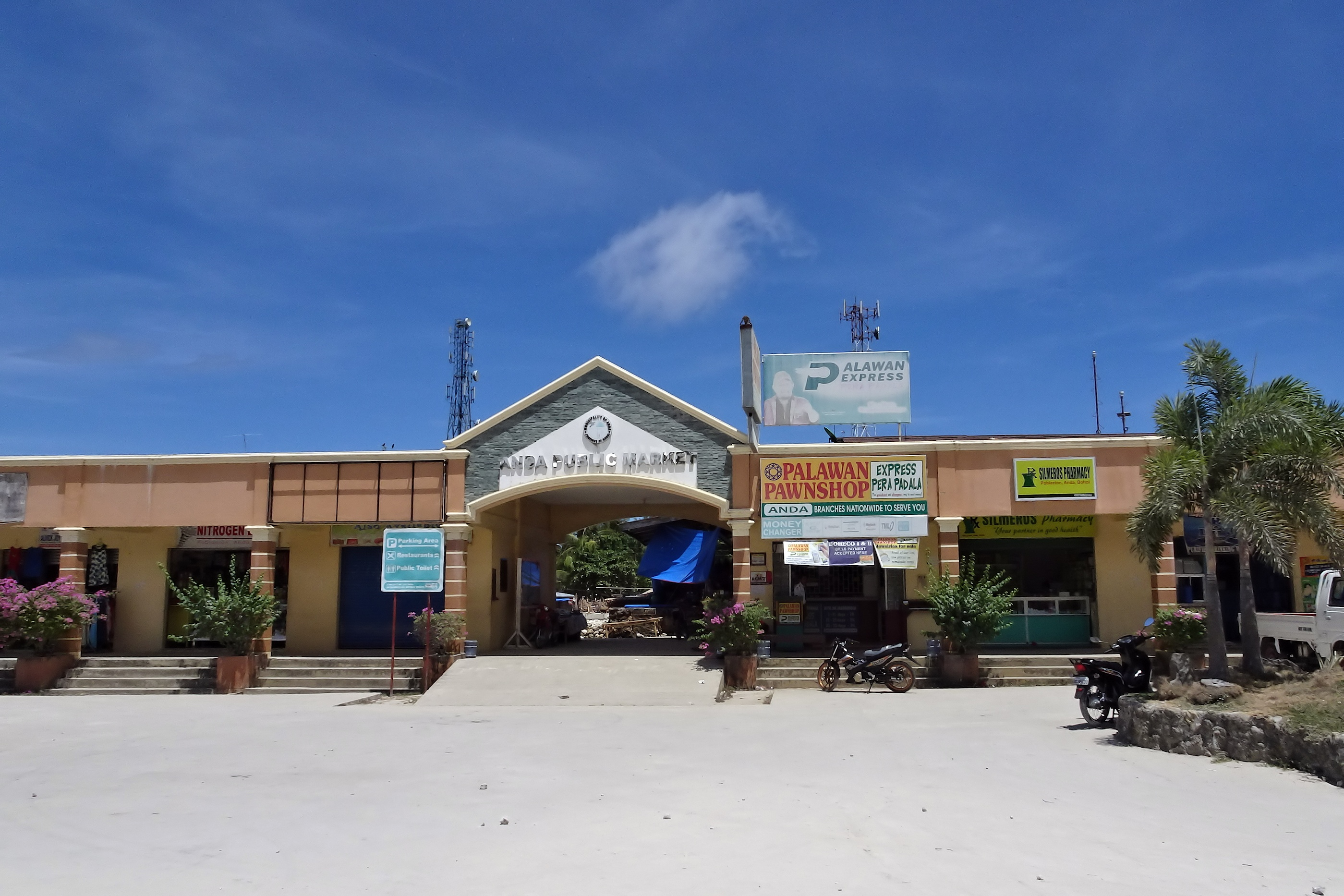
Anda public market

Poverty incidence of Anda

Source: Philippine Statistics Authority

== Government ==
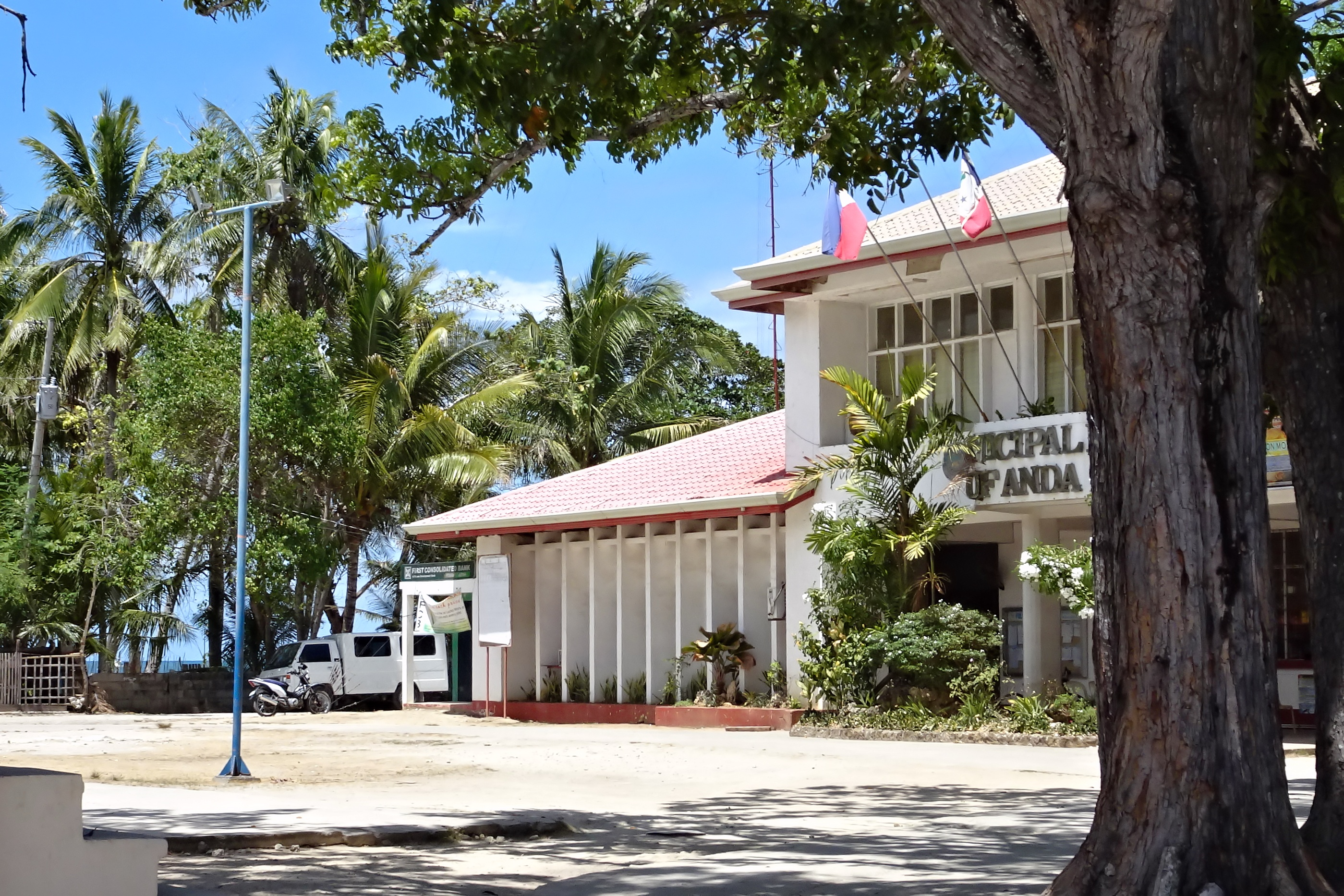
Municipal Hall of Anda

During the Spanish period the town chief executive was called "Capitan Municipal", then some time during the American regime, the title was changed to "Presidente Municipal". It was only during wartime time that the town chief executive was called a "Municipal Mayor".

In the earliest time, the town chief executive was chosen by drawing of lots among prominent persons of the town, those considered to have ample land properties and adequate education. The sequence or order of tenure of the early town executives could not easily be determined. It was only during the American regime that regular elections were held every three years, and then later reduced to four years. For a short period from 1986 to 1988, right after the EDSA Revolution, there were no elections for mayor but only officer-in-charge to act as mayor ad interim.

=== List of former chief executives ===
Capitan Municipal (from 1885 to 1919):

- Silverio Escobido
- Gabriel Escobido
- Perfecto Paguia
- Benedicto Amper
- Pablo Castro
- Esteban Escobido
- Esteban Escobal
- Lucio Felisarta
- Ramon Escobia
- Victor Paguia
- Hipolito Paguia
- Cipriano Bernido
- Eulogio Dagondon
- Valentin Timaan
- Bernabe Amper

Presidente Municipal (from 1919 to 1934):

- Victor Felicita (1919–1921)
- Diosdado Paguia (1922–1925)
- Victor Felicita (1926–1931)
- Alfonso Castillo (1931–1934)
- Diosdado Paguia (1934–1937)

Municipal Mayor (from 1938 up to the present):

- Alfonso Castillo (1938–1940)
- Vicente de los Angeles (1941–1945)
- Aquilino Deligero (1945–1955)
- Alfonso Castillo (1956–1959)
- Simeon Escobia (1960–1963)
- Teodulfo Amora (1964–1971)
- Concordia Makinano (1972–1980)
- Teodulfo Amora (1980–1986)
- Gaudioso Amora (Mar 1986–Nov 1987 (Note: Mayor ad interim))
- Edilberto Llido (1–14 Dec 1987)
- Aquilino Deligero (15 Dec 1987–6 Feb 1988)
- Paulino Amper (7 Feb 1988–May 1996)
- Angelina Simacio (May 1996–May 2000)
- Paulino Amper (May 2000 – 2010)
- Angelina Simacio (May 2010–May 2013)
- Metodio Amper (May 2013–present)
