= DYMA =

- Jagna; Philippines
- Broadcast area: Bohol
- Frequency: 100.9 MHz
- Branding: DYMA 100.9 Radyo Jagna

Programming
- Languages: Boholano, Filipino
- Format: Contemporary MOR, News, Talk

Ownership
- Owner: Apollo Broadcast Investors; (Mediascape, Inc.)
- Operator: Radyo Bol-Anon Network

History
- First air date: August 28, 2011

Technical information
- Licensing authority: NTC
- Power: 1 kW

DYMA (100.9 FM) Radyo Jagna is a radio station owned by Apollo Broadcast Investors and operated by Radyo Bol-Anon Network. Its studios and transmitter are located at the 2nd Floor, SMCNI Compound, Brgy. Poblacion, Jagna.
