= PEC Broadcasting Corporation =

Philippine radio network

- Type: Private
- Industry: Radio & TV network
- Founded: March 16, 1988
- Headquarters: Butuan
- Key people: Romeo Zerrudo; President & CEO
- Parent: Philippine Electronics and Communication Institute of Technology

PEC Broadcasting Corporation is a Philippine radio network. Its main office is located at PECBC Broadcast Center, Capitol-Bonbon Rd., Imadejas Subd., Butuan.

== PECBC stations ==
=== FM stations ===
Branding	Callsign	Frequency	Location
Real Radio Tandag	DXJR	89.3 MHz	Tandag
Magnet FM	—N/a	107.3 MHz	Glan
Nice FM	DXPE	91.9 MHz	Kidapawan
Real Radio Gingoog	—N/a	104.9 MHz	Gingoog
Heart FM Iligan	DXTA	92.1 MHz	Iligan
Lite FM	DXVS	107.7 MHz	Lala
My Radio	—N/a	97.3 MHz	Calamba
B96	DXEB	96.5 MHz	Labason
Boss Radio	DYNP	102.1 MHz	San Jose de Buenavista
Real Radio Bohol	DYDL	94.3 MHz	Carmen
MSFM	DYMS	105.3 MHz	Catbalogan
Real Radio Toledo	DYPE	107.1 MHz	Toledo
Pasalingaya FM	DWPY	88.1 MHz	Casiguran
NewGen FM	—N/a	100.7 MHz	Bulan

=== TV stations ===
Branding	Callsign	Ch. #	Location
Real Radio Teleradyo	DXGL-TV	TV-13	Butuan
