= DYDL =

Radio station in Bohol, Philippines

Real Radio Bohol (DYDL)
- Carmen; Philippines
- Broadcast area: Bohol
- Frequency: 94.3 MHz
- Branding: 94.3 Real Radio

Programming
- Languages: Boholano, Filipino
- Format: Pop MOR, OPM
- Network: Real Radio

Ownership
- Owner: PEC Broadcasting Corporation

History
- Former frequencies: 103.9 MHz; 99.3 MHz

Technical information
- Licensing authority: NTC
- Power: 1,000 watts

DYDL (94.3 FM), broadcasting as 94.3 Real Radio, is a Philippines radio station owned and operated by PEC Broadcasting Corporation. The station's studio and transmitter facilities are located at the 3rd Floor, BIT-IC Bldg., Brgy. Katipunan, Carmen, Bohol.
