= DYRD-AM =

Radio station in the Philippines

DYRD
- Tagbilaran; Philippines
- Broadcast area: Bohol and parts of Cebu
- Frequency: 1161 kHz
- Branding: DYRD 1161

Programming
- Languages: Boholano, Filipino
- Format: News, Public Affairs, Talk
- Affiliations: Catholic Media Network

Ownership
- Owner: Bohol Chronicle Radio Corporation
- Sister stations: 102.3 Kiss FM

History
- First air date: October 16, 1961
- Call sign meaning: Radio

Technical information
- Licensing authority: NTC
- Class: B (regional)
- Power: 10,000 watts

Links
- Webcast: Listen Live
- Website: www.dyrdam.com

DYRD (1161 AM) is a radio station owned and operated by the Bohol Chronicle Radio Corporation. The station's studio is located at Bohol Chronicle Bldg., #56 Bernardino Inting St., Tagbilaran, and its transmitter facilities are located along Burgos St., Tagbilaran. Based on a survey conducted by Holy Name University Center for Research and Publications in 2016, it is ranked as the most listened to AM station.
