= Bohol Chronicle =

Daily newspaper based in Bohol, Philippines

The Bohol Chronicle
- Type: Daily newspaper
- Format: Broadsheet
- Founder(s): Zoilo Dejaresco, Jr.
- Editor: Zoilo "Bingo" P. Dejaresco III
- Founded: May 16, 1954; 71 years ago
- Headquarters: Tagbilaran City, Bohol, Philippines
- Website: Bohol Chronicle

Bohol Chronicle Radio Corporation
- Type: Private
- Country: Philippines
- Headquarters: Tagbilaran, Bohol
- Broadcast area: Bohol
- Owner: Bohol Chronicle
- Key people: Zoilo "Bingo" P. Dejaresco III (president)
- Established: 2007

The Bohol Chronicle, also locally known as the Chronicle, is a weekly published newspaper in Bohol, Philippines. It is run by the Bohol Chronicle Radio Corporation, which also manages AM radio station DYRD-AM (1161 KHz) and FM radio station Kiss 102.3 FM.

== History ==
The Bohol Chronicle was founded on May 16, 1954.

In 2016, they launched their website.

The newspaper has been awarded numerous times for Best Editorial Page (2012, 2019), Best Disaster Reporting (2013), and Best in Culture and Arts (2014) by the Civic Journalism Community Press Awards.
