= DYRD-FM =

Radio station in Bohol, Philippines

Kiss FM (DYRD)
- Tagbilaran; Philippines
- Broadcast area: Bohol and parts of Cebu
- Frequency: 102.3 MHz
- Branding: 102.3 Kiss FM

Programming
- Languages: Boholano, Filipino
- Format: Contemporary MOR, OPM

Ownership
- Owner: Bohol Chronicle Radio Corporation
- Sister stations: DYRD

History
- First air date: December 4, 1980

Technical information
- Licensing authority: NTC
- Power: 1,000 watts
- ERP: 2,000 watts
- Transmitter coordinates: 9.6439712°N 123.8574818°E

Links
- Website: www.kiss102fmbohol.com

DYRD-FM (102.3 FM), broadcasting as 102.3 Kiss FM, is a radio station owned and operated by the Bohol Chronicle Radio Corporation. The station's studio and transmitter facilities are located at Bohol Chronicle Bldg., #56 Bernardino Inting St., Tagbilaran. Based on a survey conducted by Holy Name University Center for Research and Publications in 2017, it is ranked as the most listened to FM station.
