= Trinidad, Bohol =

Municipality in Bohol, Philippines

Trinidad
- Municipality
- Municipality of Trinidad
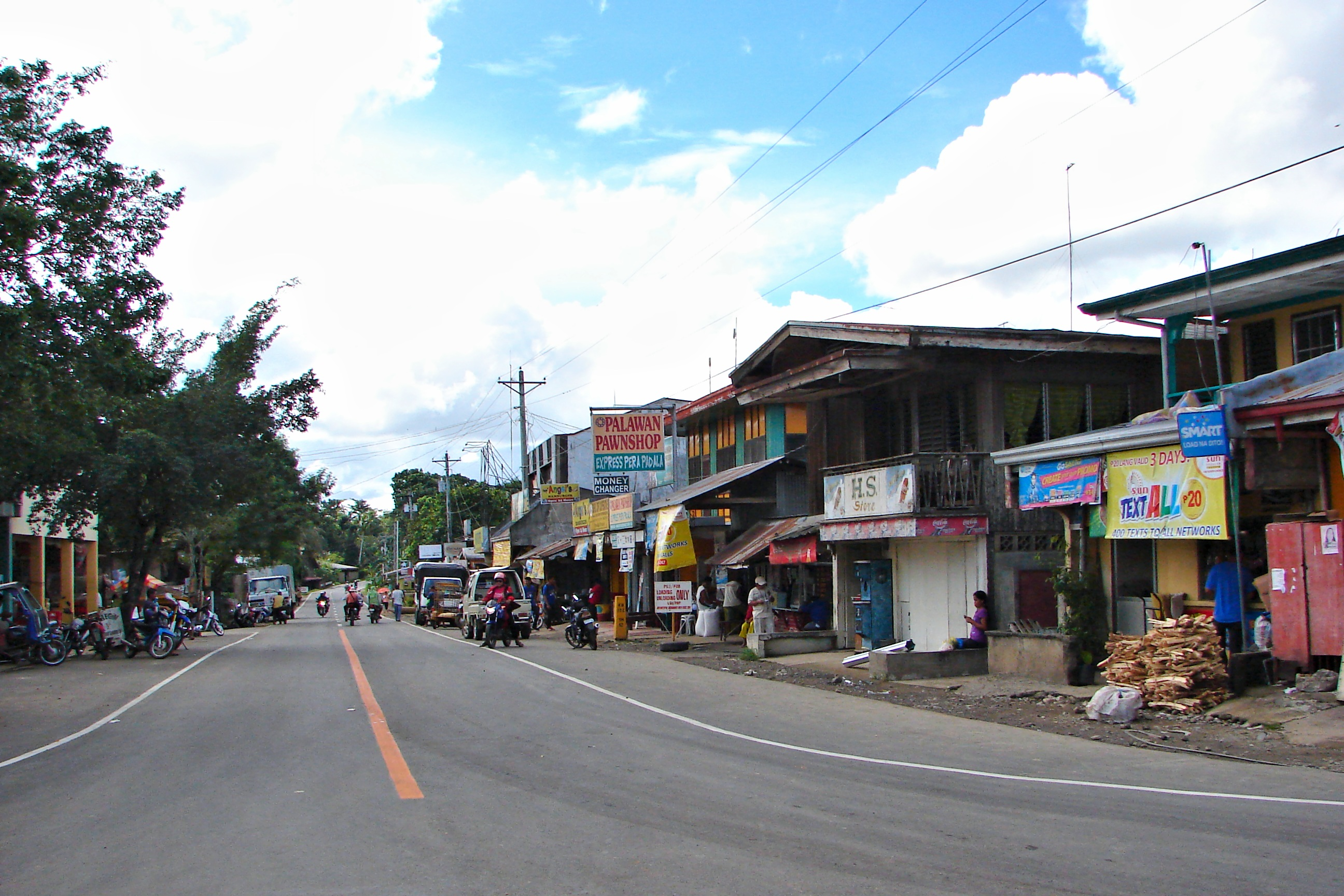
- Poblacion, Trinidad highway

- Seal

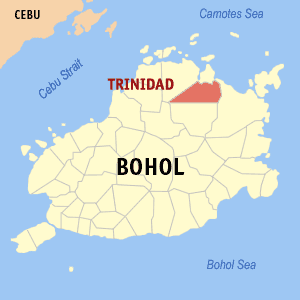
- Map of Bohol with Trinidad highlighted
- Interactive map of Trinidad
- Location within the Philippines
- Coordinates: 10°04′46″N 124°20′36″E
- Country: Philippines
- Region: Central Visayas
- Province: Bohol
- District: 2nd district
- Founded: September 1, 1947
- Named for: Trinidad Roxas
- Barangays: 20 (see Barangays)

Government
  - Type: Sangguniang Bayan
  - Mayor: Roberto Cajes
  - Vice Mayor: Joan Robie C. Imboy
  - Representative: Vanvan Aumentado
  - Municipal Council: Members: Juanilo Gonzales Orioque; Ronel Nuera Molos; Agapito Cutanda Cambangay; Gilbert Bolo Boncales; Michael James Del Rosario Lao; Christian Anthony Cabando Auxilio; Zosito Estapia Orevillo; Elmer Arapan Gabica
  - Electorate: 24,564 voters (2025)

Area
  - Total: 195.30 km^{2} (75.41 sq mi)
- Elevation: 15 m (49 ft)
- Highest elevation: 129 m (423 ft)
- Lowest elevation: 0 m (0 ft)

Population (2024 census)
  - Total: 37,191
  - Density: 190.43/km^{2} (493.21/sq mi)
  - Households: 7,898

Economy
  - Income class: 1st municipal income class
  - Poverty incidence: 22.88% (2023)
  - Revenue: ₱ 357.3 million (2024)
  - Assets: ₱ 1,009 million (2024)
  - Expenditure: ₱ 290.5 million (2024)
  - Liabilities: ₱ 279.3 million (2024)

Service provider
  - Electricity: Bohol 2 Electric Cooperative (BOHECO 2)
- Time zone: UTC+8 (PST)
- ZIP code: 6324
- PSGC: 071244000
- IDD : area code: +63 (0)38
- Native languages: Boholano dialect Cebuano; Tagalog
- Website: trinidad-bohol.gov.ph

Trinidad, officially the Municipality of Trinidad (Cebuano: Munisipyo sa Trinidad; Tagalog: Bayan ng Trinidad), is a municipality in the province of Bohol, Philippines. According to the 2024 census, it has a population of 37,191 people.

Trinidad is 99 kilometres (62 mi) from Tagbilaran.

== Etymology ==
The municipality was named after Trinidad Roxas, the wife of President Manuel Roxas, and the town is also known for Kawasan Falls and Batungay cave.

The town of Trinidad, Bohol celebrates its feast on May 15, to honor the town patron San Isidro Labrador.

== History ==
By virtue of Executive Order No. 80 signed by President Manuel Roxas on August 14, 1947, the municipality of Trinidad was organized by segregating fifteen barrios from Talibon, including Ipil which was designated as the seat of government, and three barrios from Ubay. It is the province's 37th municipality with the organization became effective on September 1.

== Geography ==
=== Barangays ===
Trinidad is politically subdivided into 20 barangays. Each barangay consists of puroks and some have sitios.

PSGC	Barangay	Population			±% p.a.		Area		PD 2024	
		2024		2010			ha	acre	/km^{2}	/sq mi
071244001	Banlasan	3.2%	1,193	1,073	▴	0.74%	986	2,437	120	310
071244002	Bongbong	3.1%	1,171	1,148	▴	0.14%	543	1,342	220	560
071244003	Catoogan	2.6%	967	826	▴	1.10%	326	806	300	770
071244004	Guinobatan	5.5%	2,038	2,011	▴	0.09%	560	1,384	360	940
071244005	Hinlayagan Ilaud	3.0%	1,134	1,095	▴	0.24%	307	759	370	960
071244006	Hinlayagan Ilaya	5.8%	2,175	1,825	▴	1.22%	441	1,090	490	1,300
071244007	Kauswagan	6.5%	2,401	2,213	▴	0.57%	3,095	7,648	78	200
071244008	Kinan‑oan	3.9%	1,462	1,311	▴	0.76%	446	1,102	330	850
071244009	La Union	5.4%	1,995	1,747	▴	0.92%	708	1,750	280	730
071244010	La Victoria	4.3%	1,611	1,518	▴	0.41%	559	1,381	290	750
071244012	Mabuhay Cabigohan	3.3%	1,211	1,133	▴	0.46%	303	749	400	1,000
071244013	Mahagbu	3.1%	1,161	1,048	▴	0.71%	547	1,352	210	550
071244014	Manuel A. Roxas	3.1%	1,138	1,017	▴	0.78%	624	1,542	180	470
071244015	Poblacion	9.6%	3,576	2,936	▴	1.37%	762	1,883	470	1,200
071244016	San Isidro	1.3%	501	629	▾	−1.56%	615	1,520	81	210
071244017	San Vicente	5.3%	1,958	1,799	▴	0.59%	2,294	5,669	85	220
071244018	Santo Tomas	3.0%	1,100	1,013	▴	0.57%	650	1,606	170	440
071244019	Soom	5.4%	1,991	1,716	▴	1.03%	411	1,016	480	1,300
071244020	Tagum Norte	4.3%	1,614	1,358	▴	1.20%	462	1,142	350	900
071244021	Tagum Sur	4.3%	1,599	1,412	▴	0.86%	570	1,409	280	730
	Total		37,191	28,828	▴	1.78%	19,530	48,260	190	14

=== Climate ===
Climate data for Trinidad, Bohol
Month	Jan	Feb	Mar	Apr	May	Jun	Jul	Aug	Sep	Oct	Nov	Dec	Year
Mean daily maximum °C (°F)	28 (82)	28 (82)	29 (84)	31 (88)	31 (88)	30 (86)	30 (86)	30 (86)	30 (86)	29 (84)	29 (84)	28 (82)	29 (85)
Mean daily minimum °C (°F)	23 (73)	23 (73)	23 (73)	23 (73)	24 (75)	24 (75)	24 (75)	24 (75)	24 (75)	24 (75)	24 (75)	23 (73)	24 (74)
Average precipitation mm (inches)	98 (3.9)	82 (3.2)	96 (3.8)	71 (2.8)	104 (4.1)	129 (5.1)	101 (4.0)	94 (3.7)	99 (3.9)	135 (5.3)	174 (6.9)	143 (5.6)	1,326 (52.3)
Average rainy days	18.0	14.1	17.1	16.8	23.7	25.7	25.8	23.3	24.2	25.9	24.0	20.6	259.2
Source: Meteoblue

== Demographics ==
Population census of Trinidad
Year	Pop.	±% p.a.
1948	14,214	—
1960	16,428	+1.21%
1970	11,461	−3.53%
1975	13,867	+3.90%
1980	15,501	+2.25%
1990	19,945	+2.55%
1995	20,893	+0.87%
2000	25,683	+4.52%
2007	27,580	+0.99%
2010	28,828	+1.62%
2015	31,956	+1.98%
2020	35,119	+2.01%
2024	37,191	+1.39%
Source: Philippine Statistics Authority

== Economy ==
Poverty incidence of Trinidad (%)

Source: Philippine Statistics Authority

== Local Government ==
2025-2028 Trinidad, Bohol Officials
Position	Name	Party
Mayor	Roberto c. Cajes	LDP
Vice Mayor	Joan Robie C. Imboy	NPC
Councilors	Juanito G. Orioque	NPC
Councilors	Ronel N. Molos	LDP
Councilors	Agapito C. Cambungay	NPC
Councilors	Gilbert B. Boncales	LDP
Councilors	Michael James D. Lao	NPC
Councilors	Christian Anthony C. Auxilio	NPC
Councilors	Zosito E. Orevillo	LDP
Councilors	Elmer A. Gabica	LDP
Ex Officio Municipal Council Members
ABC President	TBD	Nonpartisan
SK Federation President	TBD	Nonpartisan

== List of mayors ==
- Tomas Gonzales (Sep 1, 1947–1948) - Appointed
- Pedro S. Boncales (1948–1951)
- Francisco Cambangay (1952–1959)
- Vicente S. Boncales (1960–1967)
- Filomeno G. Gonzales (1968–1975) - Resigned on March 2, 1975
- Emeterio C. Boncales (Mar 1975) - OIC
- Avelino N. Puracan (Mar 3, 1975–1979) - OIC
- Avelino N. Puracan (1980–1986)
- Quirino B. Gonzales (Jul 2, 1986-Dec 27, 1986)
- Alberto A. Garcia (Feb 1988-Jun 30, 1992)
- Alberto A. Garcia (1992–1994)
- Francisco U. Gonzales (1994–1995)
- Filadelfo A. Garcia (1995–2004)
- Osias Flor (2004–2007)
- Judith Del Rosario Cajes (2007–2010)
- Roberto C. Cajes (2010–2013)
- Judith Del Rosario Cajes (2013–2022)
- Roberto C. Cajes (2022-Present)

== Gallery ==
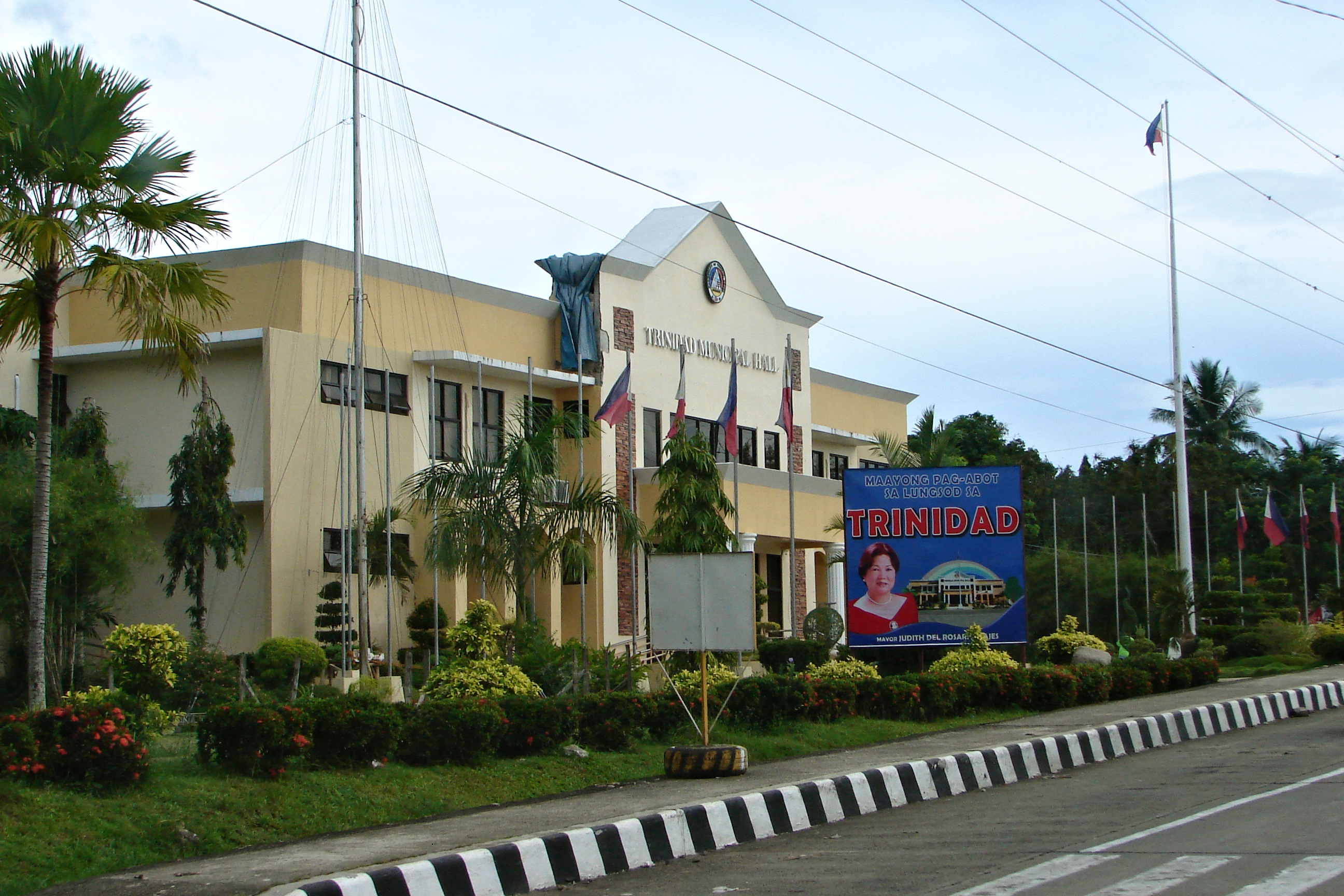
Town hall

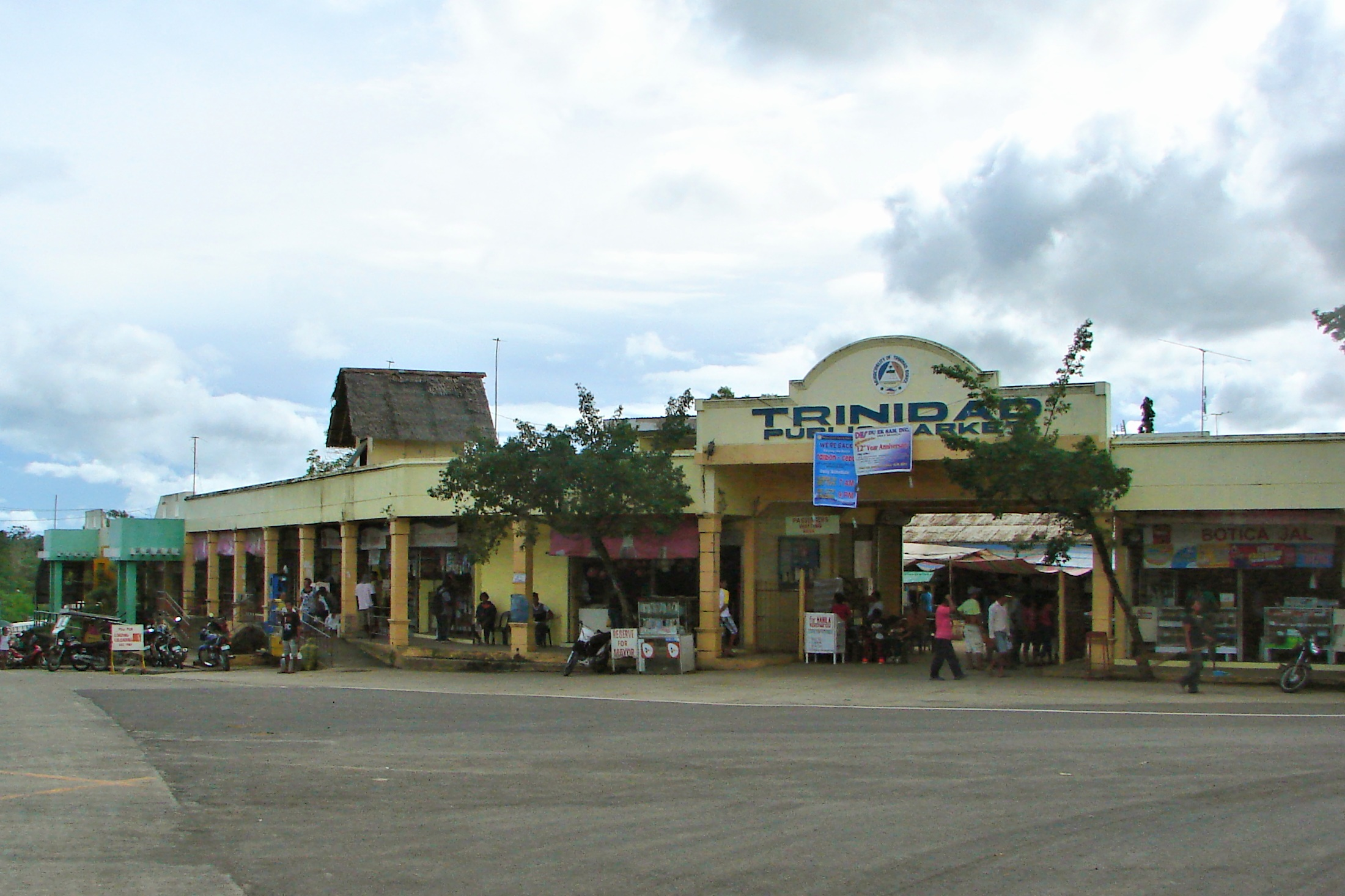
Public market
