= Guindulman =

Municipality in Bohol, Philippines

- Municipality
- Municipality of Guindulman
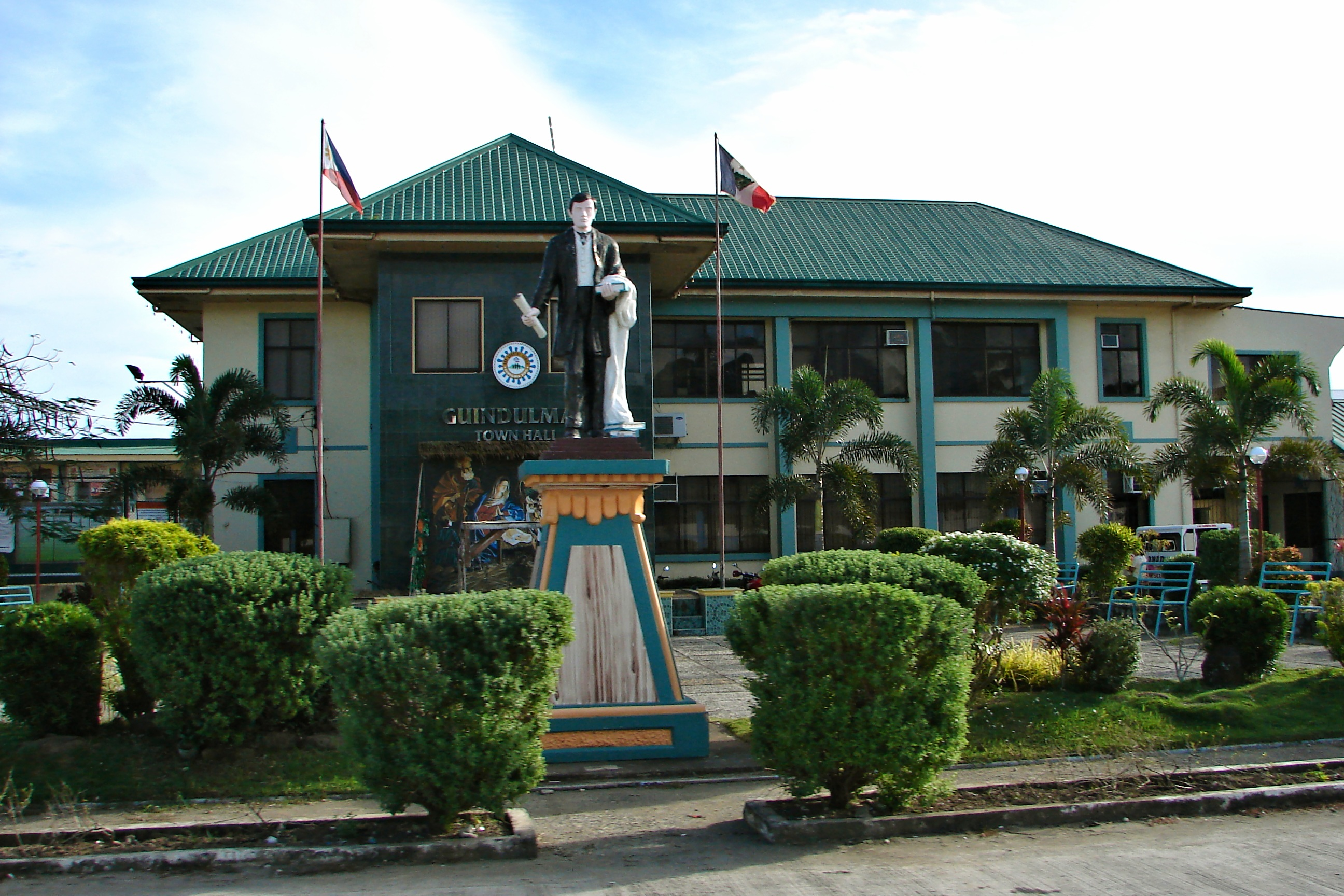
- Guindulman Town Hall

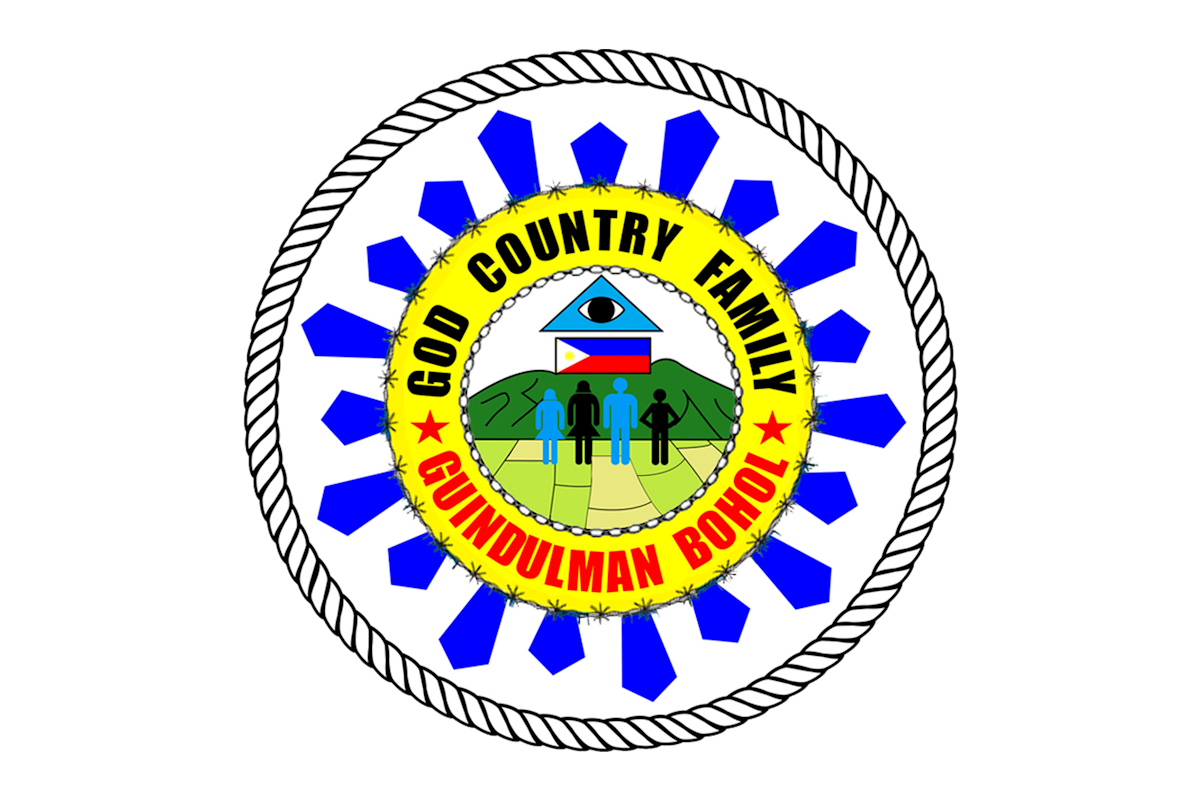
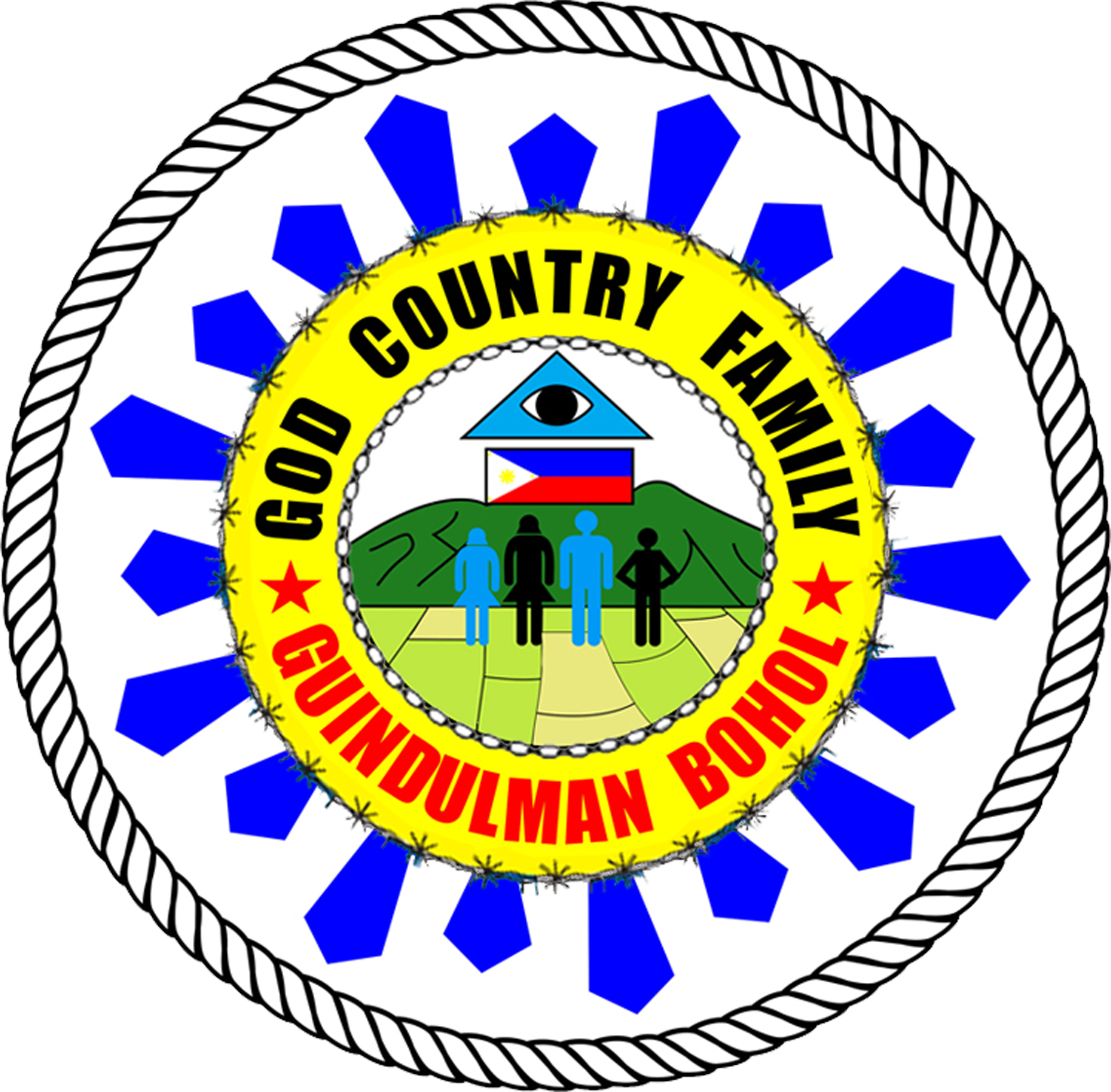
- Flag Seal

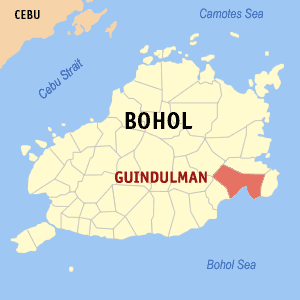
- Map of Bohol with Guindulman highlighted
- Interactive map of Guindulman
- Location within the Philippines
- Coordinates: 9°45′43″N 124°29′17″E
- Country: Philippines
- Region: Central Visayas
- Province: Bohol
- District: 3rd district
- Founded: around 1622
- Barangays: 19 (see Barangays)

Government
  - Type: Sangguniang Bayan
  - Mayor: Albino M. Balo
  - Vice Mayor: Jimmy D. Busano
  - Representative: Kristine Alexie B. Tutor
  - Municipal Council: Members: Abigail Marie Lagura-Gutang; Delfin B. Gomez; Oriculo A. Granada; Lynbell Gamutan-Cafe; Raynil B. Jamisola; Ireneo O. Pelias; Sergio S. Licot; Mario B. Golosino; NB COMELEC
  - Electorate: 24,399 voters (2025)

Area
  - Total: 179.17 km^{2} (69.18 sq mi)
- Elevation: 6.0 m (19.7 ft)
- Highest elevation: 346 m (1,135 ft)
- Lowest elevation: 0 m (0 ft)

Population (2024 census)
  - Total: 34,660
  - Density: 193.4/km^{2} (501.0/sq mi)
  - Households: 8,056

Economy
  - Income class: 2nd municipal income class
  - Poverty incidence: 25.47% (2023)
  - Revenue: ₱ 223.8 million (2024)
  - Assets: ₱ 444.4 million (2024)
  - Expenditure: ₱ 75.03 million (2024)
  - Liabilities: ₱ 102.9 million (2024)

Service provider
  - Electricity: Bohol 2 Electric Cooperative (BOHECO 2)
- Time zone: UTC+8 (PST)
- ZIP code: 6310
- PSGC: 0701223000
- IDD : area code: +63 (0)38
- Native languages: Boholano dialect Cebuano; Tagalog

Guindulman, officially the Municipality of Guindulman (Cebuano: Munisipyo sa Guindulman; Tagalog: Bayan ng Guindulman), is a municipality in the province of Bohol, Philippines. According to the 2024 census, it has a population of 34,660 people.

Guindulman celebrates its feast on the first Saturday of September, to honor the town patron Our Lady of Consolation.

== Etymology ==
In the olden days, names of certain places were sometimes ascribed to some usual or common incidents or occurrences as is the case with the town of Guindulman. The place was originally called Guinduluman or Guindapu-nan or Guindapu-an, from a vernacular expression which means "something or somebody who is overtaken by darkness".

There is no official record to show how the town really got its name. However, folklore has it that during the early part of the Spanish era in the Philippines, there were only two formally organized towns along the southeastern and eastern coastal borders of Bohol, namely, Jagna and Batuanan (now known as Alicia). Because of the distances, travelers starting from either of these towns in the early morning were sure to be overtaken by nightfall before reaching the next place; hence the name "guinduluman".

Folklore further says that the early condition of the area itself had something to contribute to the appropriateness of the term because the center of the town was once surrounded and almost entirely shaded by a dense forest which also made the town dark even during daytime. (Note: At the latitude of Guindulman, daylight is only 12h07 ± 35 minutes throughout the year.) Travelers from other places passing through this thick forest could observe its surrounding darkness because the sunlight could hardly penetrate through the thick foliage, thus causing darkness in the area at any time of the day. Such actual condition of the particular place, therefore, gave added significance to the created name.

== History ==
It is hard to fix a definite date when this town was established as official records were destroyed during the war. However, Francisca Libres Piezas cited in her compilation that the town of Guindulman was already established before the Tamblot Rebellion of 1622. So Guindulman may now be almost 400 years old. The 1818 Spanish census showed that there were 1,500 native families and 6 Spanish-Filipino families in Guindulman.

During the Philippine revolution against the Spanish government, there was no fighting in town reported. The people were submissive to the Spanish authorities.

Guindulman was burned down during the Philippine–American War in 1899. Guerrilla warfare was already resorted to by the local insurgents known as "insurectos". A resistance movement was organized under the leadership of Colonel Pedro Samson whose headquarters was in Monte Verde in the upper part of the town. There was no battle fought in the poblacion of Guindulman, but a memorable encounter took place in the barrio of Cabantian wherein both sides suffer heavy casualties.

The historical incident happened when American troops passed by the barrio of Cabantian, the "insurectos" ambushed the troops by jumping from the hilltops and killing many American soldiers with their bolos. However, because of the superiority of American weapons, the insurgents likewise suffered several casualties. On account of such incident, the furious American patrols then burned the houses of the particular village including the rice stocks in the fields. Still dissatisfied, they shot cows and carabaos on sight.

During the Japanese occupation in 1944, another similar encounter occurred between the Japanese troops and members of the guerrilla unit which was organized by the Major Esteban Bernido, native of Guindulman who also became a representative of the 3rd Congressional district of Bohol, governor of the province, and finally occupied one of the important cabinet positions of the country. The memorable incident started with an ambush made by the guerrillas under Major Bernido right on the boundary of Guindulman and Duero in Cabantian. The Japanese suffered heavy casualties while the guerrilla unit escaped unharmed. As a reprisal, the Japanese burned the entire poblacion, leaving only the convent and the church which were occupied by their garrison.

After the burning of the entire Poblacion (town center), the displaced families residing in the area evacuated to the upper parts of the town from barangay Bulawan and Catungawan to Mayuga and boundaries of neighboring towns. Hearing the plight of the people and feeling responsible for the conflagration brought by the Japanese garrison to the locals, the guerrillas staged a mission with a goal to uplift the spirits of their own troops and the locals that support their cause. A squad of Guerillas went to retrieve a bust of the Town's patron Our Lady of Consolation in the Town's church under the shade of darkness and the shadows of huge trees that once occupied the area. They were spotted carrying the heavy sculpture going west from the church by Japanese garrison troops stationed at the nearby bell tower and fired upon. The Guerillas suffered injuries but were able to flee and successfully brought their objective back to their camp in the highlands. The Japanese troops gave no chase as they were not familiar with the terrain and the anticipation of a diversionary attack by the guerillas meant that leaving post would jeopardize the garrison defenses. Deeply religious, the mission meant a huge success to the locals and brought hope to the families that fled the Japanese occupation. A hope to which they would hold on to until the whole island of Bohol would then be liberated by American and Filipino forces in the summer of 1945.

== Geography ==
Guindulman is bounded by Duero to the southwest, Pilar to the northwest, Candijay to the north, Anda in the east, and the Bohol Sea to the south. It is 89 kilometres (55 mi) from Tagbilaran.

=== Barangays ===
Guindulman is politically subdivided into 19 barangays. Each barangay consists of puroks and some have sitios.

PSGC	Barangay	Population			±% p.a.	
		2024		2010		
071223001	Basdio	5.4%	1,887	1,883	▴	0.01%
071223002	Bato	3.6%	1,262	1,263	▾	−0.01%
071223003	Bayong	3.8%	1,300	1,352	▾	−0.27%
071223004	Biabas	3.8%	1,314	1,491	▾	−0.87%
071223005	Bulawan	2.9%	1,008	918	▴	0.65%
071223006	Cabantian	4.5%	1,549	1,388	▴	0.76%
071223007	Canhaway	8.9%	3,071	3,150	▾	−0.18%
071223008	Cansiwang	2.5%	851	786	▴	0.55%
071223009	Casbu	2.8%	960	929	▴	0.23%
071223011	Catungawan Norte	2.8%	977	1,069	▾	−0.62%
071223010	Catungawan Sur	6.0%	2,095	1,764	▴	1.20%
071223013	Guinacot	5.3%	1,828	1,767	▴	0.24%
071223014	Guio‑ang	8.2%	2,858	2,627	▴	0.59%
071223016	Lombog	5.6%	1,956	2,050	▾	−0.33%
071223017	Mayuga	7.1%	2,448	2,535	▾	−0.24%
071223018	Sawang (Poblacion)	5.3%	1,837	1,869	▾	−0.12%
071223019	Tabajan (Poblacion)	7.3%	2,530	2,437	▴	0.26%
071223021	Tabunok	2.1%	711	747	▾	−0.34%
071223022	Trinidad	5.7%	1,966	1,764	▴	0.75%
	Total		34,660	31,789	▴	0.60%

=== Climate ===
Climate data for Guindulman, Bohol
Month	Jan	Feb	Mar	Apr	May	Jun	Jul	Aug	Sep	Oct	Nov	Dec	Year
Mean daily maximum °C (°F)	28 (82)	29 (84)	30 (86)	31 (88)	31 (88)	30 (86)	30 (86)	30 (86)	30 (86)	29 (84)	29 (84)	29 (84)	30 (85)
Mean daily minimum °C (°F)	23 (73)	22 (72)	23 (73)	23 (73)	24 (75)	25 (77)	24 (75)	24 (75)	24 (75)	24 (75)	23 (73)	23 (73)	24 (74)
Average precipitation mm (inches)	102 (4.0)	85 (3.3)	91 (3.6)	75 (3.0)	110 (4.3)	141 (5.6)	121 (4.8)	107 (4.2)	111 (4.4)	144 (5.7)	169 (6.7)	139 (5.5)	1,395 (55.1)
Average rainy days	18.6	14.8	16.5	16.7	23.9	26.4	25.6	24.1	24.4	26.3	23.7	20.5	261.5
Source: Meteoblue

== Demographics ==
Population census of Guindulman
Year	Pop.	±% p.a.
1903	12,002	—
1918	22,017	+4.13%
1939	23,855	+0.38%
1948	27,220	+1.48%
1960	28,352	+0.34%
1970	29,972	+0.56%
1975	31,820	+1.21%
1980	32,918	+0.68%
1990	37,400	+1.28%
1995	40,015	+1.27%
2000	40,714	+0.37%
2007	43,331	+0.86%
2010	31,789	−10.66%
2015	32,408	+0.37%
2020	34,104	+1.08%
2024	34,660	+0.39%
Source: Philippine Statistics Authority

== Economy ==
Poverty incidence of Guindulman (%)

Source: Philippine Statistics Authority

== Notable personalities ==
- Dr. Maria Fe A. Piezas, Vice Mayor
- Gina S. Kano, Fitness & Bodybuilding Professional
- Fr. Narciso Hernandez, Augustinian Recollect Priest (1827)
- Teogenes Pelegrino, Boxer representing the Philippines at the 1968 Summer Olympics

== See also ==
- Eskaya people

== Gallery ==
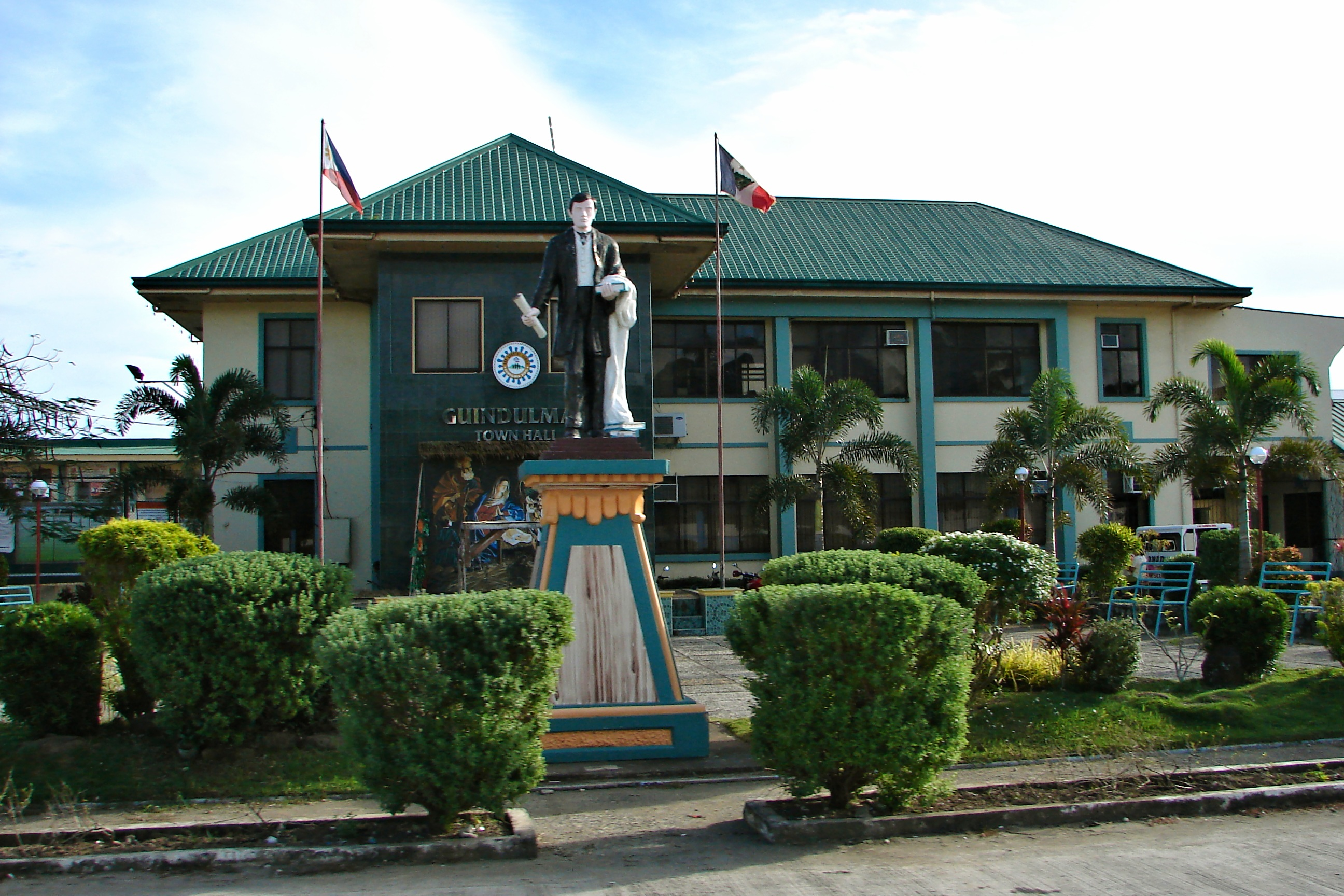
Guindulman Town Hall

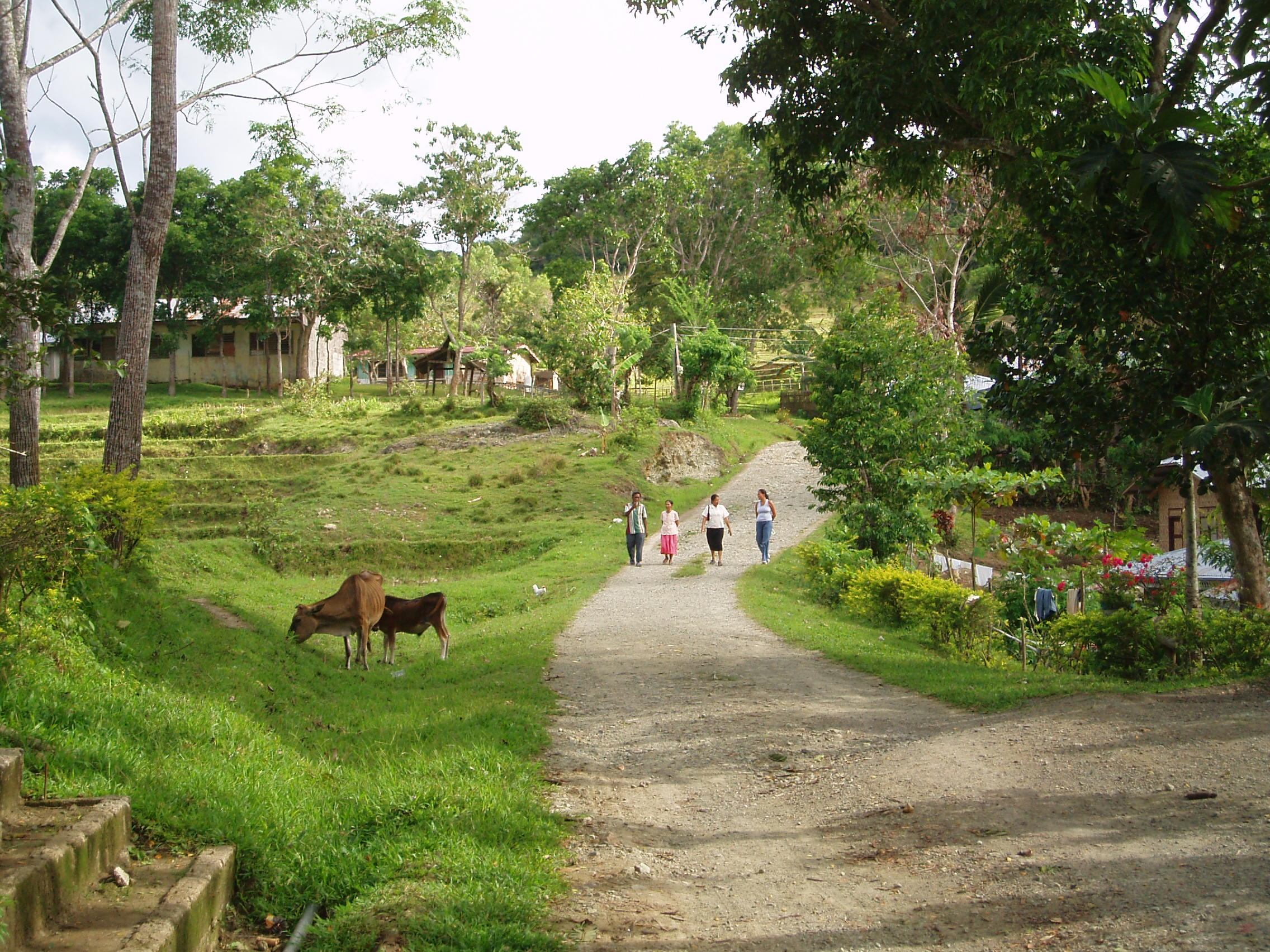
Biabas barangay

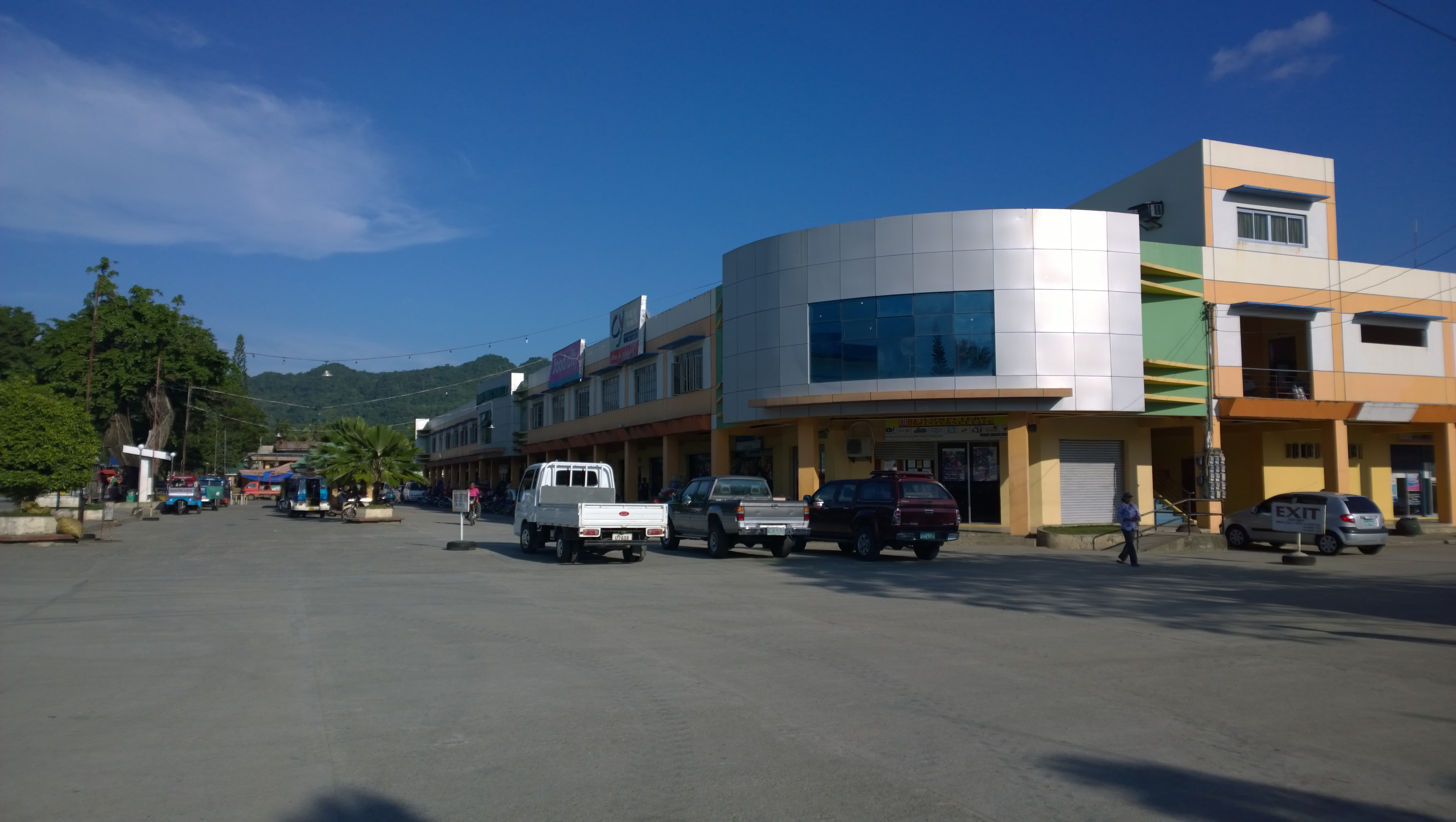
Guindulman Public Market

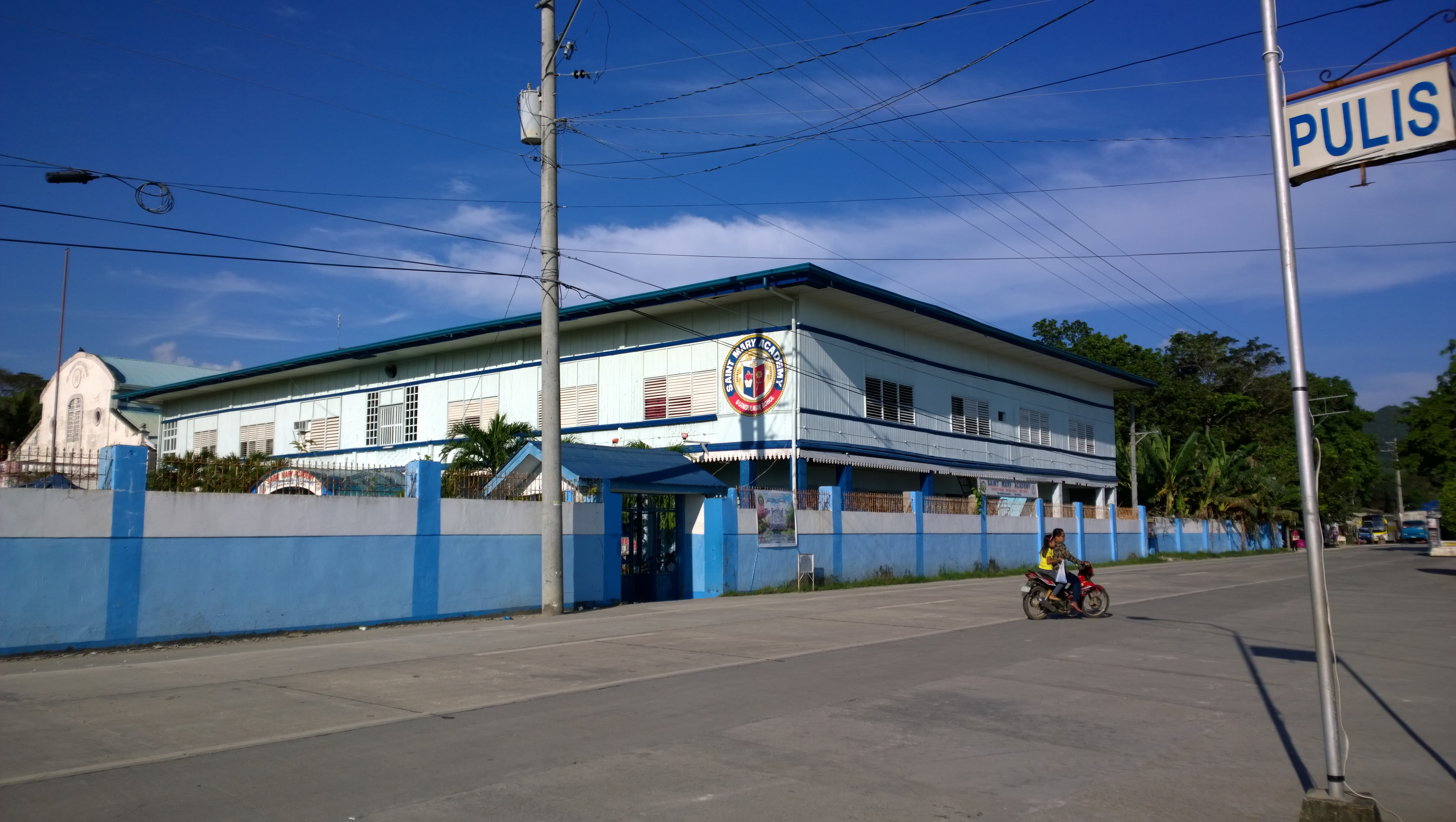
St. Mary Academy, Guindulman, Bohol

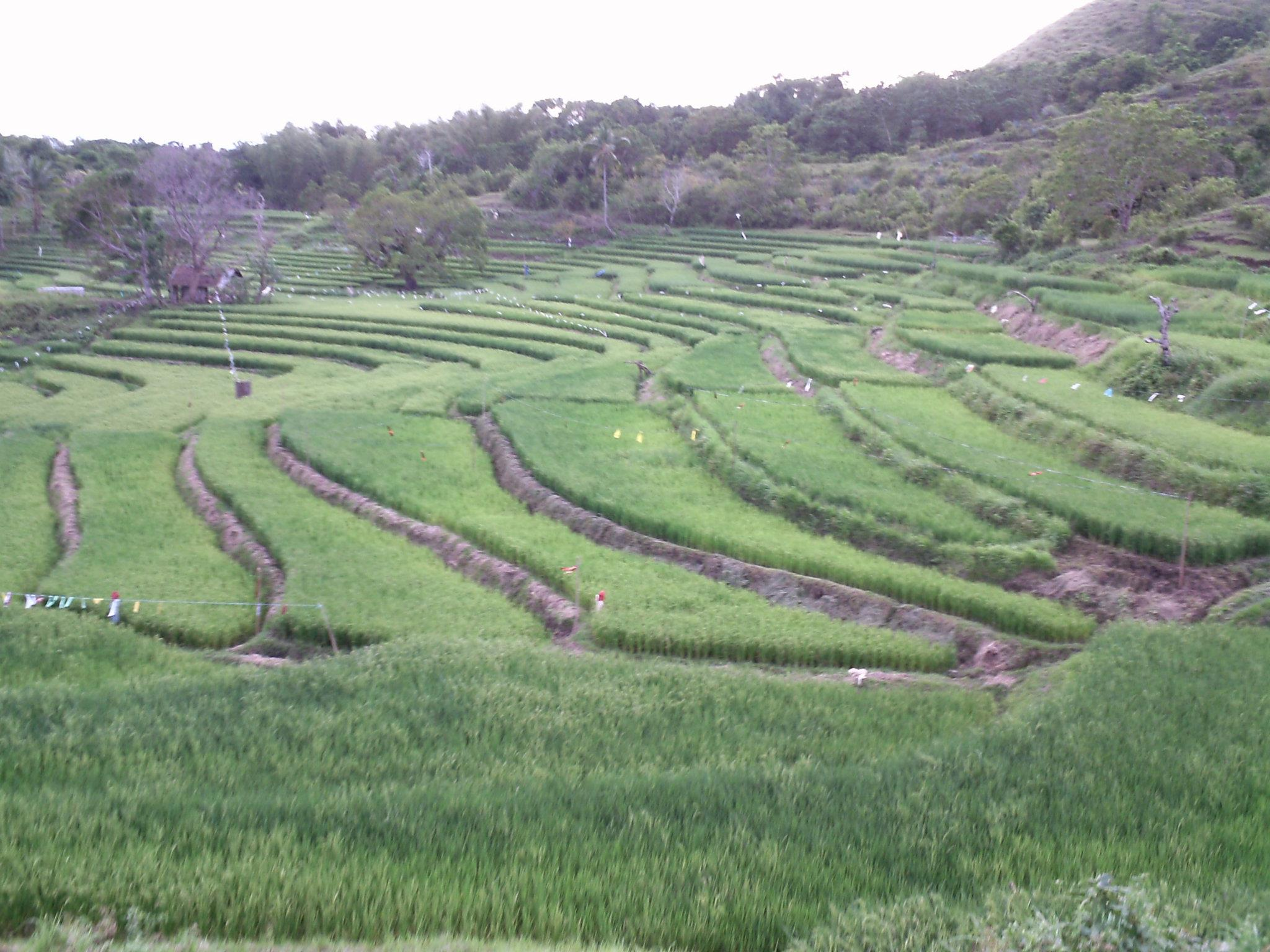
Rice Terraces in Barangay Guinacot
