= David Tirol =

Filipino politician from Bohol

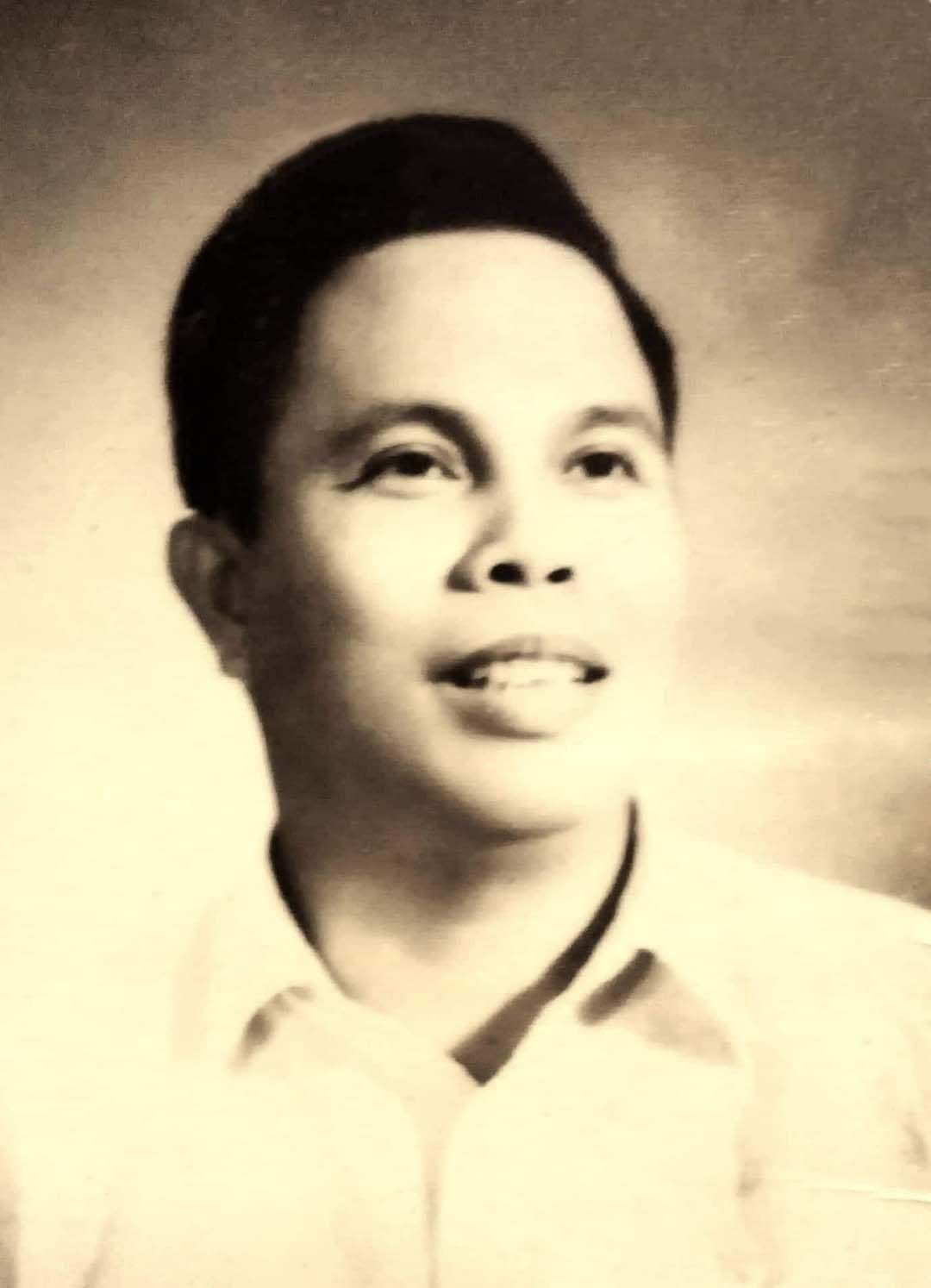

22nd Governor of Bohol
- In office June 30, 1992 – June 30, 1995
- Vice Governor: Rene Relampagos
- Preceded by: Constancio Chatto Torralba
- Succeeded by: Rene Relampagos

Member of the Philippine House of Representatives from Bohol's 2nd congressional district
- In office June 30, 1987 – June 30, 1992
- Preceded by: Pablo Malasarte
- Succeeded by: Erico Aumentado

Member of the Regular Batasang Pambansa
- In office June 30, 1984 – March 25, 1986
- Constituency: Bohol

Vice Governor of Bohol
- In office 1967–1984
- Governor: Lino Ibarra Chatto (1967–1978); Esteban Bernido (1978); Rolando Butalid (1978–1984)
- Preceded by: Lino Ibarra Chatto
- Succeeded by: Maximino L. Boiser Jr.

Member of the Bohol Provincial Board
- In office 1964–1967

Member of the Tagbilaran Municipal Council
- In office 1960–1964

Personal details
- Born: David Belarmino Tirol; May 1, 1933 Cebu City, Philippines
- Died: March 16, 2022 (aged 88) Tagbilaran City, Philippines
- Resting place: Serenity Park; Tagbilaran, Bohol
- Party: Nacionalista Party
- Other political affiliations: KBL, NPC
- Spouse: Amalia Reyes-Tirol
- Occupation: Politician
- Profession: Lawyer, Educator

David Belarmino Tirol (May 1, 1933 – March 16, 2022) was a former governor, vice governor, and member provincial board member of Bohol, and congressman of the Philippine House of Representatives.

He was dubbed Bohol's political wonder boy, by the local media for his unblemished string of election victories during the heights of his political career that spans for over 35 years.

== Early life ==
David B. Tirol was born on May 1, 1933, in Cebu City. He is a son of Victoriano Tirol Sr. and Illuminada Belarmino-Tirol, of Bato, Buenavista, Bohol

His father, Atty. Victoriano Tirol Sr., is the founder Rafael Palma College (now University of Bohol) in Tagbilaran City, which later became Bohol's first university.

== Education ==
Tirol graduated Salutatorian both in elementary and in secondary school. After high school, he took up Associate in Arts and proceeded to Bachelors of Arts. He finished his Bachelor of Laws in 1956 as Valedictorian. He successfully passed the Philippine Bar Examinations in the same year.

In 1960, Tirol also got his Degree in Commerce. He completed his master's degree in education in 1968 as magna cum laude.

In 1975, he graduated cum laude for his master of science in Business Administration at the University of Bohol and eventually completed his doctorate degree benemeritus at the same institution

== Academic career ==
Tirol worked as a college professor at Rafael Palma (later University of Bohol) College of Commerce from 1967 to 1975. He eventually became the dean of the College of Commerce.

He was appointed executive vice president of the school and vice chairman of the board of trustees at the same time, until 1983.

He became the president of the university from 1984 to 1992, while simultaneously serving as chairman of the board.

In 1992, he became president emeritus of the University of Bohol, served until 1997.

== Political career ==
In 1960, Tirol started his political career when he was elected as a municipal councilor of Tagbilaran at the age 26.

In 1963, he was elected as a senior board member of the province of Bohol.

In 1967, he elected vice governor of the province and served until 1984.

In 1984 Tirol elected and served as assemblyman at the Regular Batasang Pambansa.

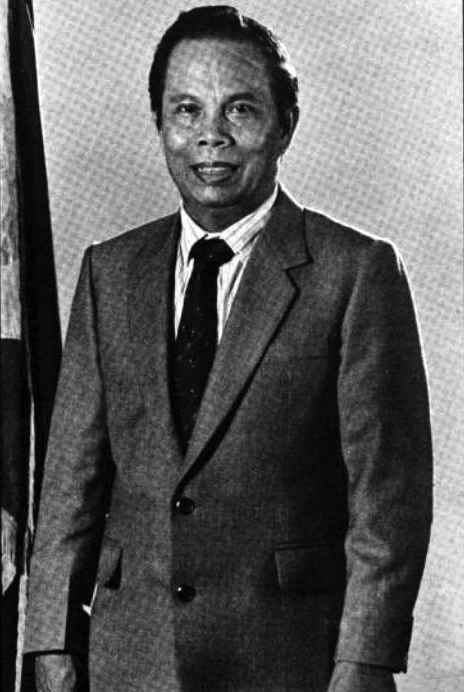
Tirol official portrait during the 8th Congress.

In 1987, he was elected congressman representing second district of Bohol and served until 1992.

On July 22, 1987, during the 8th Congress of the Philippines, he filed HB00003 (House Bill No. 3), entitled An Act Creating the municipality of San Pascual in the province of Bohol. The said house bill aims to separate barangay San Pascual, from its mother town of Ubay, Bohol. San Pascual is also birthplace of his wife, Amalia Reyes-Tirol. It reached the third reading on August 2, 1988, however, didn't passed in upper house.

In 1992, Tirol was elected governor, the highest post in the province, winning over the incumbent governor. He only served of one term in the office until 1995.

He also served as head of the Philippine National Red Cross-Bohol Chapter for a number of years and was a president of the Integrated Bar of the Philippines - Tagbilaran Chapter.

He was a national delegate to the 40th session of the United Nations, held in New York. He was also a Philippine delegate to the ASEAN Parliament in Manila in 1991.

In total, Tirol have served 35 consecutive years in politics and went back to his private lifein 1995.

== Personal life ==
Tirol married Amalia Maboloc Reyes of San Pascual, Ubay, Bohol on April 28, 1958, and they had 11 children.

His wife, Amalia Tirol was also a member of Bohol Provincial Board from 2004 to 2010, representing the 2nd District of the province.

== Death ==
Tirol reportedly died on March 16, 2022, at the Ramiro Community Hospital in Tagbilaran City. His remains was laid at Serenity Park, Manga, also in Tagbilaran City on March 20, 2022.

Political offices
Preceded by Constancio Chatto Torralba	Governor of Bohol; 1992–1995	Succeeded by Rene Relampagos
Preceded by Lino Ibarra Chatto	Vice-Governor of Bohol; 1967–1984	Succeeded by Maximino L. Boiser Jr.
House of Representatives of the Philippines
New constituency	Member of Parliament for Bohol; 1984–1986	Constituency abolished
Preceded by Pablo Malasarte	Representative, 2nd District of Bohol; 1987–1992	Succeeded by Erico Aumentado
