= Governor of Bohol =

Local chief executive in the Philippines

- Gobernador ng Lalawigan ng Bohol
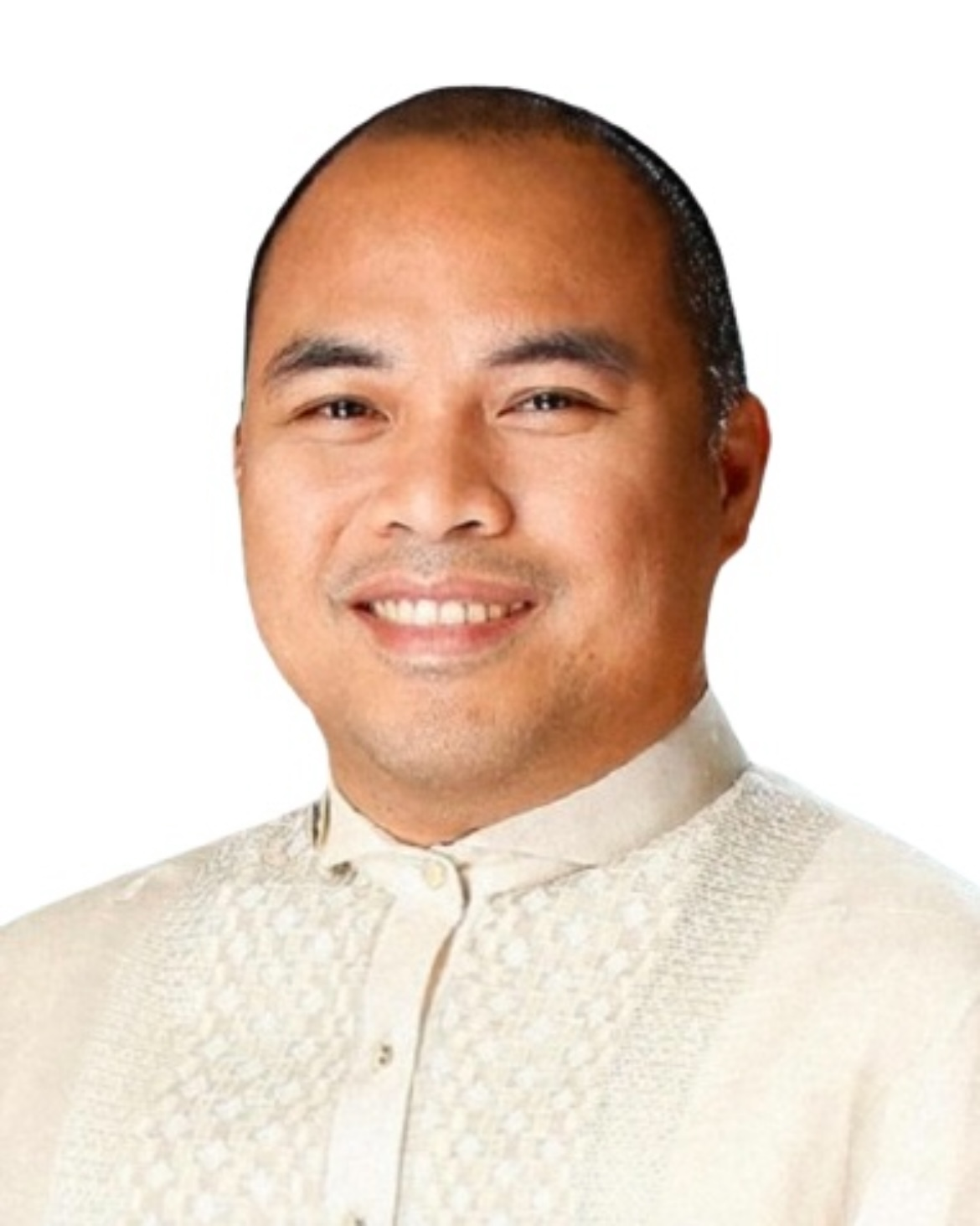
- Incumbent; Erico Aristotle Aumentado since August 1, 2024 (reinstated)
- Style: The Honourable
- Residence: Governor's Mansion, Tagbilaran City, Bohol
- Seat: Bohol New Provincial Capitol
- Appointer: Elected via popular vote
- Term length: 3 years, renewable maximum not eligible for re-election immediately after three consecutive terms
- Inaugural holder: Guillermo Kirkpatrick
- Formation: March 3, 1854
- Website: Official Website of the Province of Bohol

The Governor of Bohol (Filipino: Punong Lalawigan ng Bohol) is the local chief executive of the provincial government of Bohol, Philippines. The governor holds office at the Bohol New Provincial Capitol in Tagbilaran City and its official residence is at the Governor's Mansion located along Carlos P. Garcia Avenue in Cogon District, also in Tagbilaran. Like all local government heads in the Philippines, the governor is elected via popular vote, and may not be elected for a fourth consecutive term (although the former governor may return to office after an interval of one term). In case of death, resignation or incapacity, the vice governor becomes the governor. Along with the governor of Cebu, city mayors of Cebu, Lapu-lapu, and Mandaue, the province's chief executive is a member of the Regional Development Council of the Central Visayas Region.

== List of governors of Bohol ==
Governors of Bohol

1. SPANISH PERIOD (from 1854 – 1898)
Name	Term	Note
Guillermo Kirkpatrick	March 3, 1854 – March 3, 1857	First Governor of Bohol (together with Siquijor) when it became a separate politico-military province from Cebu on March 3, 1854 through a signed decree of Governor-General Manuel Pavía. He is a former Captain of the Corps of Engineers, who mapped Bohol and Siquijor and constructed many roads and stone bridges from Guindulman-Tagbilaran-Inabanga, including the old Capitol Building (now Bohol National Museum) while imposing 40-day-Polo y servicio. In 1855, to prevent constant emigration of Boholanos, and to gather enough men for Polo y Servicio, he imposed a lockdown, requiring potential emigrants to obtain passports which is only renewable every year. Boholanos caught without a passport in other provinces were put into prison. A complaint was sent (apocryphally by Doña Martinez (?), a nanny of the queen and the great-grandmother of Teodorico Ramasola of Maribojoc), to Queen Isabella II, who then appointed Bernardo Salvador, a lawyer as Lieutenant Governor of the province. As a consequence, the governor requires to report and seek approvals from the Lt. Governor for any of his decisions. Spanish officials cannot dismiss Salvador since he was a direct appointee of the queen. With no real executive power, he resigned as a result of political pressures.
Juan Garcia y Navarro	March 4, 1857 – March 10, 1859	Also a former Captain of Corps of Engineers. He was appointed after Kirkpatrick's resignation, who faced similar difficulty with no political power with the seating Lt. Governor-in-charge. In 1857, the whole Visayas was reorganized under a Regional District Governor, opting Salvador to return to Department of Finance, since he wasn't a military man.
Anastacio de Hoyos y Zendegui	March 10, 1859 – 1860	Lt. Governor-in-Charge, as Garcia relieved his post.
Juan Garcia y Navarro	1860 – 1862	Officially no longer a governor but empowered to act for matters he started as governor.
Jose Diaz y Quintana	1863	Bohol was again administered by Cebu. He was then the Politico-Military Governor of Cebu.
Francisco Herrera Davila	1864	He came to wind up the papers of Bohol. Regional district governor of the Visayas.
Antonio Martinez de Espinosa y San Juan	October 1, 1864– 1871	Bohol was again became fully independent from Cebu on July 22, 1864
Santiago Ibañez y Comez	1868 - August 30, 1869	Wrongly assigned as Alcaldía mayor of Bohol. However, Bohol is not an Alcadia but rather a politico-military province. He died while in office caused by an accident.
Pablo Diaz Lomelino	1871 – 1874	
Manuel Bengoechea y Tapia	1874 – 1876	
Joaquin Bengoechea y Tapia	1877 – 1878	
Adolfo Martin de Baños y Paz	September 1878 – 1881	First term. In 1880, Boholanos petition him to remain at the capitol.
Juan Franco Gonzalez	1881 – 1884	
Luis Martinez Alcobendas	1884 - 1885	
Francisco Augusto Linares y Pombo	February 1885 – December 10, 1889	
Adolfo Martin de Baños y Paz	December 11, 1889 – 1892	On his second term
Eustasio Gonzalez Liquiñano	1892 – 1894	Jurisdiction on Siqujor was transferred to Negros Oriental.
Francisco Ortiz Aguado	1894 – November 5, 1895	
Adolfo Ascencion Gonzalez	November 5, 1895 – May 22, 1897	
Eduardo Moreno Esteller	May 22, 1897 – December 20, 1898	With a rank of Lieutenant Colonel, the last Spanish Governor of Bohol

2. REVOLUTIONARY GOVERNOR (1899-1900)
No.	Image	Name	Term	Origin	Note(s)
1		Bernabe Fortich Reyes	January 16, 1899 – December 1901	Cavite, later settled in Dauis	Former Alcalde de Ayuntamiento (Board Member) of Cebu, assigned as temporary governor by president Emilio Aguinaldo on January 16, 1899 with Eduardo Calceta as army chief. First elected governor on February 1899 and non-native. Elected president of short-lived Bohol Republic on June 11, 1899.

3. AMERICAN PERIOD (1901-1907)
No.	Image	Name	Term	Origin	Note(s)
2		Aniceto Velez Clarin	March 15, 1901 – February 20, 1904	Loay	first civil governor, appointed for being non-revolutionary. Revolutionary government of Bohol was still under governor Reyes. Former Juez de Paz of Loay and presidente municipal of Tagbilaran.
3		Salustiano Mangaya-ay Borja	March 15, 1904 – February 28, 1907	Tagbilaran	first elected civil governor. Former presidente municipal of Tagbilaran.

4. PHILIPPINE LEGISLATURE (1907-1937)
No.	Image	Name	Term	Origin	Note(s)
4		Macario F. Sarmiento	March 1, 1907 – December 31, 1909	Tagbilaran	Elected. Former presidente municipal of Tagbilaran.
5		Fernando G. Rocha	January 16, 1910 – October 15, 1916	Tagbilaran	Elected twice
6		Eutiquio Boyles	October 16, 1916 – October 15, 1919	Ubay	Elected. Former Presidente Municipal of Ubay and congressman of Bohol's third district.
7		Juan Sarmiento Torralba	October 16, 1919 – October 15, 1925	Tagbilaran	Elected twice. Later elected as Senator from 1931-1935.
8		Filomeno Caseñas	October 16, 1925 – October 1, 1931	Jagna	Elected twice
—		Jose Orbeta Caseñas	October 1–15, 1931	Jagna	OIC governor. Former mayor of Jagna and younger brother of Filomeno Caseñas.
9		Celestino Barel Gallares	October 16, 1931 – October 15, 1934	Tagbilaran	Elected
10		Carlos Polestico Garcia	October 16, 1934 – December 31, 1937	Talibon	Elected

5. COMMONWEALTH PERIOD (1938-1946)
No.	Image	Name	Term	Origin	Note(s)
—		Carlos Polestico Garcia	January 1, 1938 – August 29, 1941	Talibon	Re-elected, later became the 8th President of the Philippines in 1957
11		Agapito Yap Hontanosas	August 29, 1941 – July 9, 1942	Dauis	former board member and succeeded Garcia, when the latter run for senate.
11		Agapito Yap Hontanosas	July 9, 1942 - May 20, 1945	Dauis	appointed governor during Japanese occupation with the seat of government in Tagbilaran.
12		Conrado D. Marapao	May 22, 1942 – May 31, 1946	Loay	former board member and appointed Governor of the Free Local Civil Government by President Manuel L. Quezon, with the seat of government in Carmen.

6. THIRD PHILIPPINE REPUBLIC (1946-1978)
No.	Image	Name	Term	Origin	Note(s)
13		Perfecto Bastes Balili	June 1, 1946 – December 31, 1947	Loboc	Appointed by President Manuel A. Roxas.
14		Jacinto Castel Borja	January 1, 1948 – December 31, 1951	Tagbilaran	Elected. Former ambassador, the first and only Boholano to serve as Philippine envoy to the United Nations.
15		Juan Cuarto Pajo	January 1, 1952 – December 31, 1955	Valencia	Elected
15		Juan Cuarto Pajo	January 1, 1956 – January 15, 1958	Valencia	Re-elected but later appointed executive secretary of Pres. Carlos P. Garcia
—		Timoteo Butalid	January 16–31, 1958	Tagbilaran	OIC, incumbent senior board member. Later became the first elected civil vice-governor of the province.
16		Esteban Bernido	February 1, 1958 – December 31, 1959	Guindulman	WWII veteran and former congressman. Appointed by Pres. Carlos P. Garcia
16		Esteban Bernido	January 1, 1960 – December 31, 1961	Guindulman	Elected
16		Esteban Bernido	January 1, 1962 – December 31, 1965	Guindulman	Re-elected
16		Esteban Bernido	January 1, 1966 – June 7, 1967	Guindulman	Re-elected / Resigned - appointed PHHC manager under Pres. Ferdinand Marcos Sr.
17		Lino Ibarra Chatto	June 8, 1967 – December 31, 1967	Balilihan	OIC, incumbent vice-governor
17		Lino Ibarra Chatto	January 1, 1968 – December 31, 1971	Balilihan	Elected
17		Lino Ibarra Chatto	January 1, 1972 – March 3, 1978	Balilihan	Re-elected, became the longest-serving governor (11 years)
—		David Belarmino Tirol	March 4–27, 1978	Tagbilaran	OIC, incumbent vice-governor
—		Esteban Bernido	March 28 – October 12, 1978	Guindulman	Appointed by Pres. Ferdinand Marcos Sr., on his 5th term and the first to serve under 3 presidents.

7. FOURTH PHILIPPINE REPUBLIC (1978-1986)
No.	Image	Name	Term	Origin	Note(s)
18		Rolando Gatal Butalid	October 13, 1978 – December 31, 1980	Tagbilaran	Former mayor of Tagbilaran. Appointed by Pres. Marcos Sr.
18		Rolando Gatal Butalid	January 1, 1981 – March 15, 1986	Tagbilaran	Elected

8. FIFTH PHILIPPINE REPUBLIC (1986–present)
No.	Image	Name	Term	Origin	Note(s)
19		Victor L. dela Serna	March 16, 1986 – October 7, 1987	Calape	OIC, appointed by President Corazon C. Aquino. Bohol's first bar top-notcher (1965 Philippine Bar Examination)
—		Maximino L. Boiser Jr.	October 7–26, 1987	Talibon	OIC, incumbent vice-governor (acting).
20		Constancio Chatto Torralba	October 17 – December 1, 1987	Cortes	OIC, former undersecretary of DPWH under Pres. Corazon C. Aquino.
21		Asterio V. Akiatan	December 1, 1987 – February 1, 1988	Dimiao	OIC, former mayor of Dimiao
—		Constancio Chatto Torralba	February 2, 1988 – June 30, 1992	Cortes	Elected
22		David Belarmino Tirol	June 30, 1992 – June 30, 1995	Tagbilaran	Elected
23		Rene Lopez Relampagos	June 30, 1995 – June 30, 2001	Loon	Elected twice
24		Erico Boyles Aumentado	June 30, 2001 – June 30, 2010	Ubay	first governor to be elected and completed 3 consecutive terms
25		Edgardo Migriño Chatto	June 30, 2010 – June 30, 2019	Balilihan	Elected in 3 consecutive terms.
26		Arthur Cua Yap	June 30, 2019 – June 30, 2022	Manila, resident of Loboc	second non-native governor to be elected
27		Erico Aristotle Cabagnot Aumentado	June 30, 2022 – May 28, 2024	Ubay	Suspended from May 28-July 31, 2024 amid the Chocolate Hills resort controversy.
—		Dionisio Victor Ancog Balite	May 28, 2024 – July 17, 2024	Valencia	Incumbent vice governor. Acting governor for the duration of Aumentado's suspension. Died while in office.
—		Tita Virtudazo Baja	July 18–31, 2024	Garcia Hernandez	Incumbent board member. Succeeded vice-governor Balite. Acting governor until Aumentado's reinstatement on July 31, 2024.
—		Erico Aristotle Cabagnot Aumentado	July 31, 2024 - June 30, 2025	Ubay	Reinstated on July 31, 2024 by the Ombudsman.
—		Erico Aristotle Cabagnot Aumentado	June 30, 2025 – present	Ubay	Reelected.
