= Bakilid =

Bakilid can refer to the following places in the Philippines:

- Bakilid, Mandaue, a barangay in the city of Mandaue
- Bakilid, a barangay in the municipality of Dimiao, Bohol
