= 2025 Bohol local elections =

General election in the Philippines

2025 Bohol gubernatorial election
- May 12, 2025
- Gubernatorial election
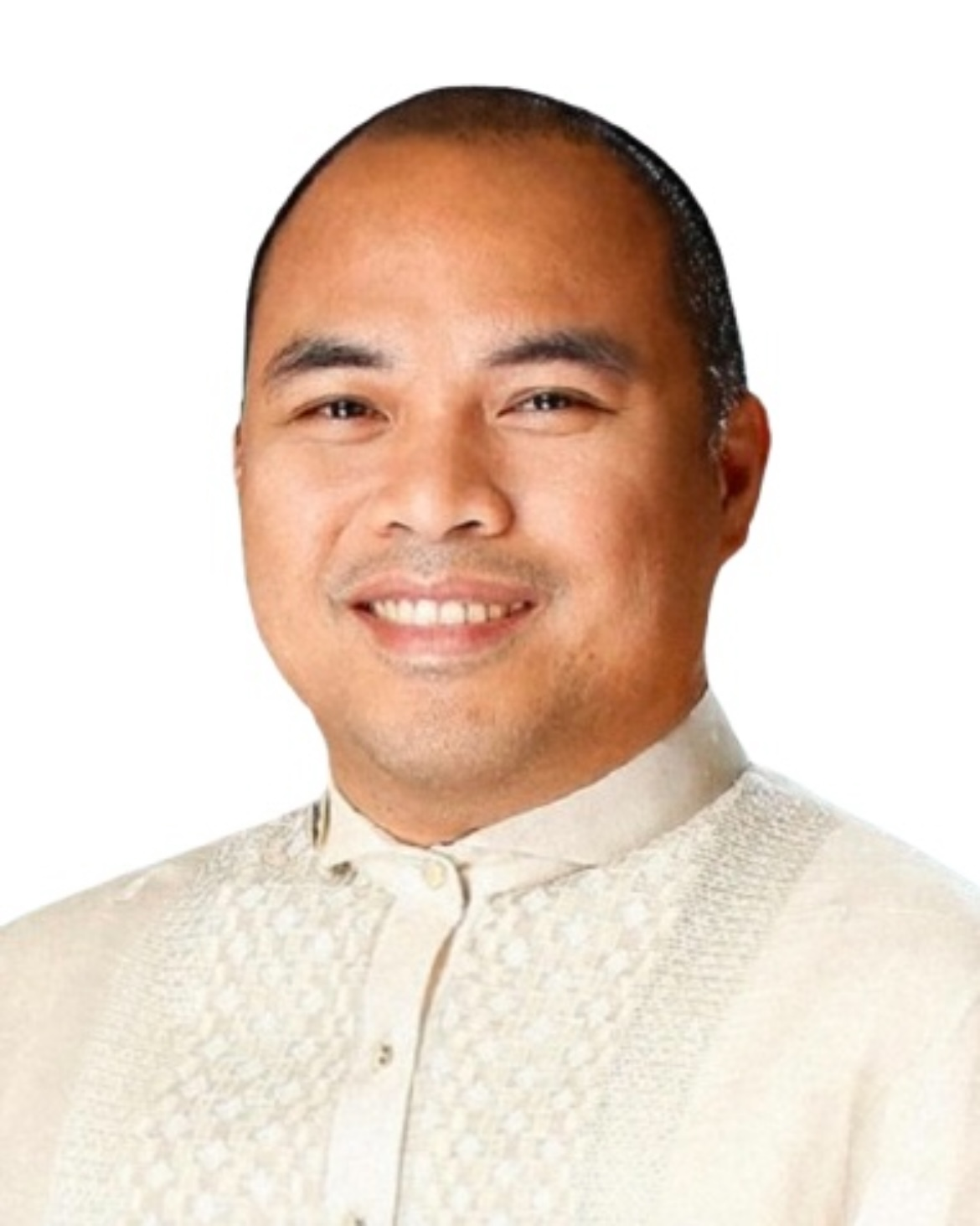

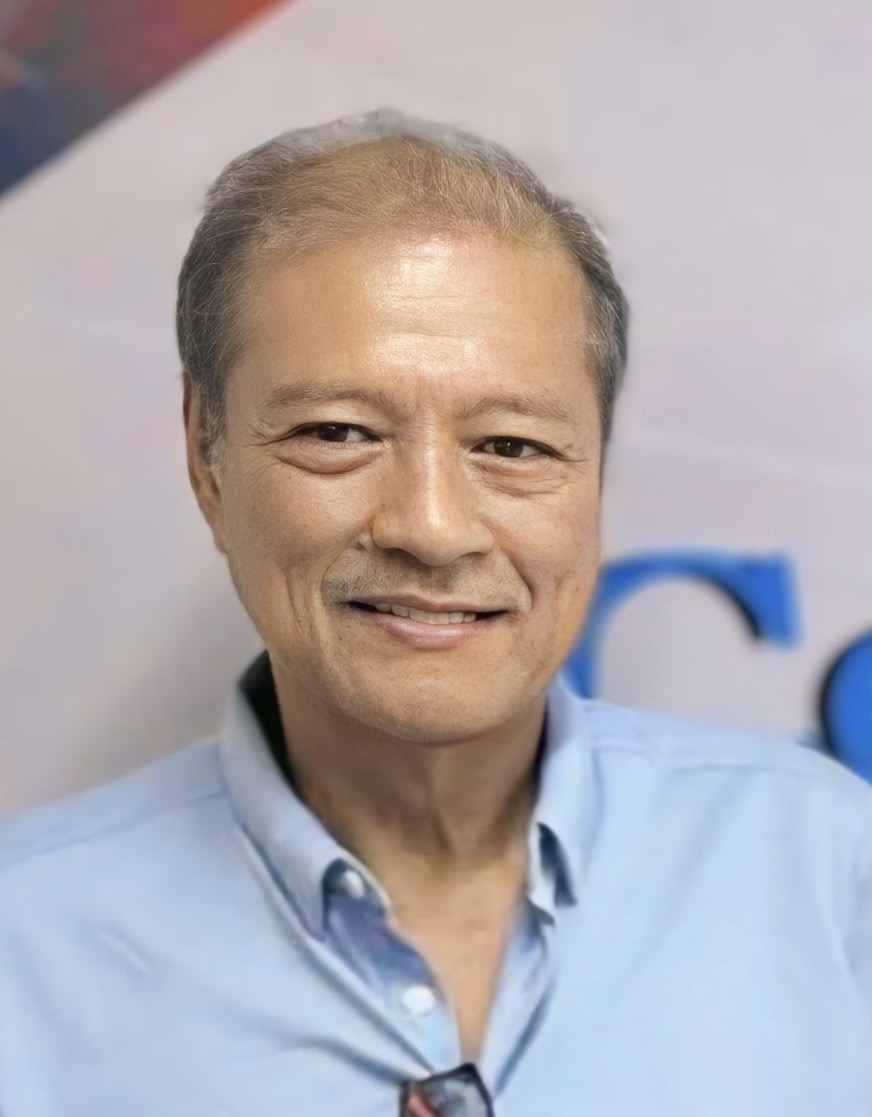
Candidate	Erico Aristotle Aumentado	Dan Neri Lim	Erastus Nuñez Leopando
Party	PFP	Independent	WPP
Running mate	Nicanor Besas	Gerardo Garcia
Popular vote	563,746	153,748	24,852
Percentage	65.43%	17.84%	2.88%
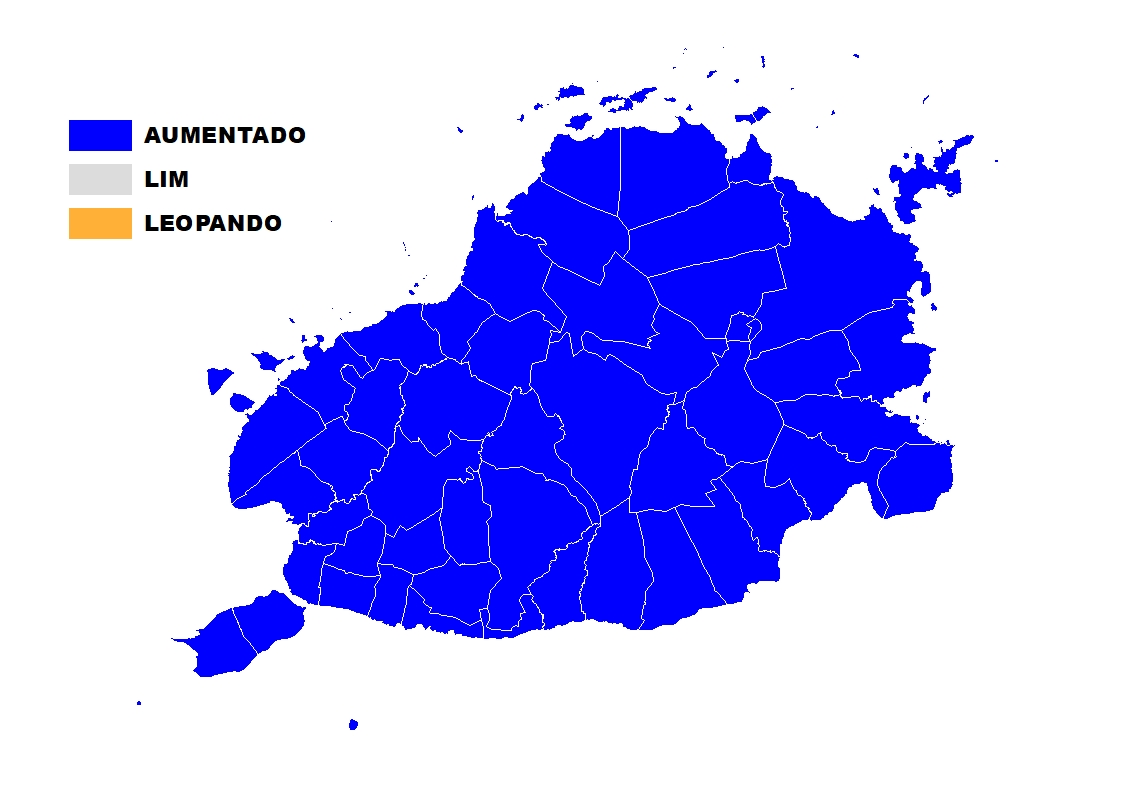
- A map highlighting the 2025 Bohol gubernatorial election results. Aumentado unanimously won in city and towns of the province.
Governor before election
Erico Aristotle Aumentado
NPC
Elected Governor
Erico Aristotle Aumentado
PFP

Local elections were held in Bohol on May 12, 2025, as part of the 2025 Philippine general election. Registered voters elected candidates for all local positions: a mayor, vice mayor, and council, as well as members of the Sangguniang Panlalawigan, the vice governor, governor, and representatives for the three districts of Bohol.

== Background ==
At the end of voters registration on September 30, 2024, based on the COMELEC's data, the province's voting population is now - 981,564, an increase of 3.35%, equivalent to 31,773 additional voters from the 2022 elections' electorate of 949,791, making Bohol, as the 17th vote-rich province in the country.

From October 1 to 8, 2024, a total of 36 hopefuls submitted their respective certificates of candidacy (COC) at the Provincial COMELEC office to contest any of the 15 provincial and congressional seats in the province. There is a noticeable 14% decrease on the number of provincial political aspirants from the last local elections which is 42.

On May 13, 2025, Provincial Board of Canvassers proclaimed Abante Bohol tandem Erico Aristotle Aumentado and Nicanor Besas as duly elected governor and vice-governor respectively, winning it by a landslide.

== Provincial elections ==
=== Gubernatorial election ===
- Electorate (2025): 981,564
- Turnout (2025): 861,655 (87.78%)

Aris Aumentado (PFP) is the incumbent. He shifted from his old political party, NPC to PFP, the president's current party. On the last day of filing of COCs, former Tagbilaran mayor Dan Lim, submitted his COC as an independent candidate but under Padayon Bohol banner.

Aumentado won via landslide victory for his second consecutive term as governor.

Bohol gubernatorial election
Party	Candidate	Votes	%
PFP	Erico Aristotle Aumentado	563,746	65.43%
Independent	Dan Neri Lim	153,748	17.84%
WPP	Erastus Leopando	24,852	2.88%
Valid ballots		742,346	86.15%
Invalid or blank votes		119,309	13.85%
Total votes		861,655	100.00%

=== Vice gubernatorial election ===
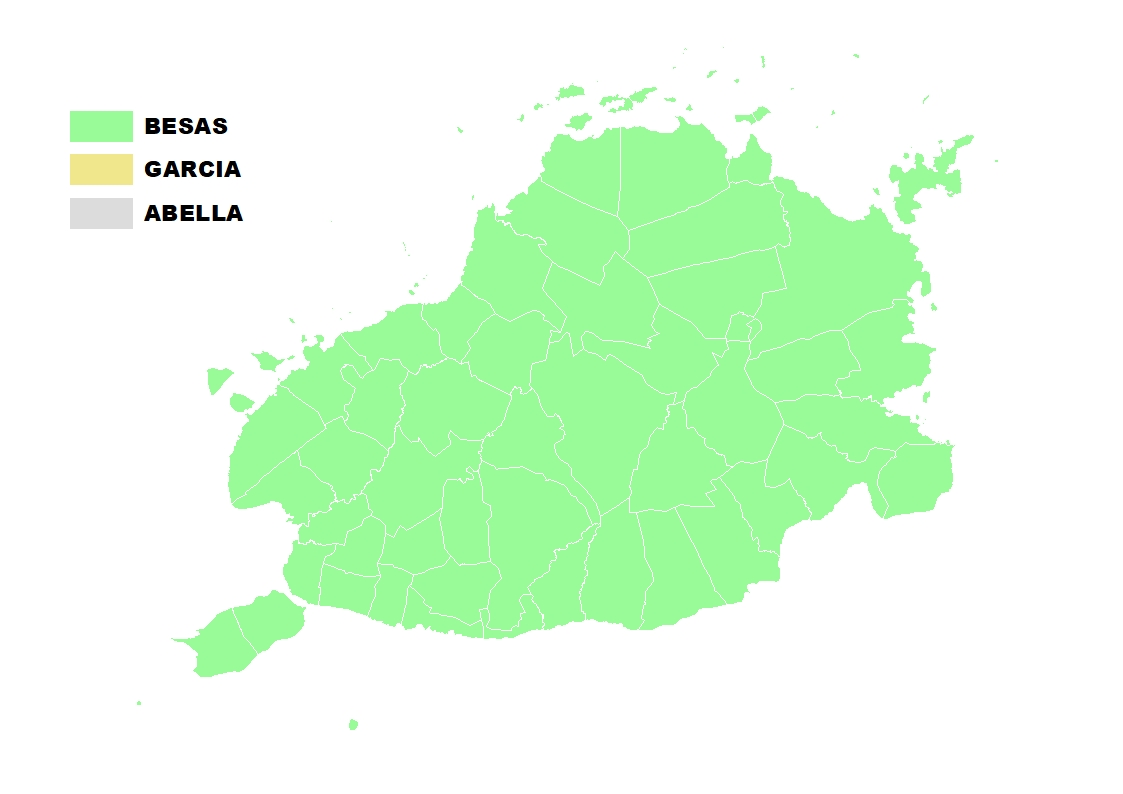
2025 Bohol's Vice-Gubernatorial Election Results. Besas unanimously won in all city and towns of the province.

- Electorate (2025): 981,564
- Turnout (2025): 861,655 (87.78%)

Senior board member Tita Baja succeeded incumbent vice governor Dionisio Victor Balite on July 17, 2024, who died that day. However, she decided to not seek a full term in the office, opting a return to the Sangguniang Panlalawigan. The ruling coalition nominated ex-officio board member and Bohol PCL Federation President Nicanor Besas (NP). Besas ran against former board member Gerardo Garcia (LP), and a perennial independent candidate, Santos Abella.

Besas won and elected as the new vice-governor of the province.

Bohol vice-gubernatorial election
Party	Candidate	Votes	%
Nacionalista	Nicanor Besas	420,658	48.82%
Liberal	Gerardo Garcia	156,152	18.12%
Independent	Santos Abella	61,215	7.10%
Valid ballots		638,025	74.05%
Invalid or blank votes		223,630	25.95%
Total votes		861,655	100.00%

=== Sangguniang Panlalawigan ===
Parties are as stated in their certificates of candidacy.

==== First district ====
- Electorate (2025): 327,862 Rank: 1/3
- Turnout (2025): 290,365 (88.56%) Rank: 1/3

Incumbents—Venzencio Arcamo, Lucille Lagunay, and Aldner Damalerio all vied for reelection. Incumbent Tagbilaran City councilor Jonas Cacho (LDP) and former GCGMH director Mutya Kismet Tirol-Macuno (Reform PH) also ran for the position.

Bohol 1st District Sangguniang Panlalawigan election
Party	Candidate	Votes	%
PFP	Lucille Yap-Lagunay	118,275	40.73%
RP	Mutya Kismet Tirol-Macuno	118,124	40.68%
NUP	Venzencio Arcamo	95,855	33.01%
NUP	Aldner Damalerio	91,739	31.59%
PFP	Margaux Herrera-Caya	87,968	30.30%
LDP	Jonas Cacho	66,348	22.85%
Independent	Emmanuel Ramasola	50,406	17.36%
DPP	Amon Rey Loquere	4,473	1.54%
Valid ballots		633,188	72.69%
Invalid or blank votes		79,302	27.31%
Total votes		290,365	100.00%

==== Second district ====
- Electorate (2025): 326,937 Rank: 2/3
- Turnout (2025): 285,305 (87.27%) Rank: 3/3

All incumbents—Tomas Abapo Jr., Jiselle Rae Aumentado Villamor, and Vierna Mae Boniel-Maglasang bid for reelection. Term-limited PCPG mayor and LMP-Bohol president Fernando Estavilla and former board member, and current barangay Tugas, PCPG chairwoman Frans Gelaine Garcia vied to secure a seat.

All Abante Bohol candidates—Villamor, Abapo, and Estavilla were elected.

Bohol 2nd District Sangguniang Panlalawigan election
Party	Candidate	Votes	%
PFP	Jiselle Rae Aumentado Villamor	153,122	53.67%
PFP	Tomas Abapo Jr.	127,350	44.64%
PFP	Fernando Estavilla	118,707	41.61%
NPC	Vierna Mae Boniel-Maglasang	72,380	25.37%
Akbayan	Frans Gelaine Garcia	67,287	23.58%
Valid ballots		538,846	63.60%
Invalid or blank votes		105,690	36.40%
Total votes		285,305	100.00%

==== Third district ====
- Electorate (2025): 326,765 Rank: 3/3
- Turnout (2025): 285,985 (87.52%) Rank: 2/3

Incumbents Tita Virtudazo Baja (now vice governor), Nathaniel Binlod, Elpidio Bonita, and Greg Crispinito Jala all ran for reelection. Incumbent Carmen councilor Angilita Toribio-Abundo and Candijay councilor Arnielito Olandria also ran for their seats.

On October 12, 2024, board member aspirant DJ Balite, and son of late of vice governor Balite, was appointed a regular board member of the third district by the president.

On May 13, 2025, all Abante Bohol -Nacionalista candidates—Baja, Balite, Jala, and Binlod were proclaimed winners.

Bohol 3rd District Sangguniang Panlalawigan election
Party	Candidate	Votes	%
Nacionalista	Tita Virtudazo Baja	167,099	58.43%
Nacionalista	Dionisio Joseph Balite	152,854	53.45%
Nacionalista	Greg Crispinito Jala	130,729	45.71%
Nacionalista	Nathaniel Binlod	113,871	39.82%
NPC	Dominic Villafuerte	58,724	20.53%
NPC	Arnielito Olandria	50,930	17.81%
NPC	Elpidio Bonita	48,971	17.12%
NPC	Renato Espinosa	35,549	12.43%
Independent	Angilita Toribio-Abundo	22,506	7.87%
Valid ballots		781,233	93.63%
Invalid or blank votes		19,181	6.61%
Total votes		285,985	100.00%

== Congressional elections ==
Parties are as stated in their certificates of candidacy.

=== First district ===
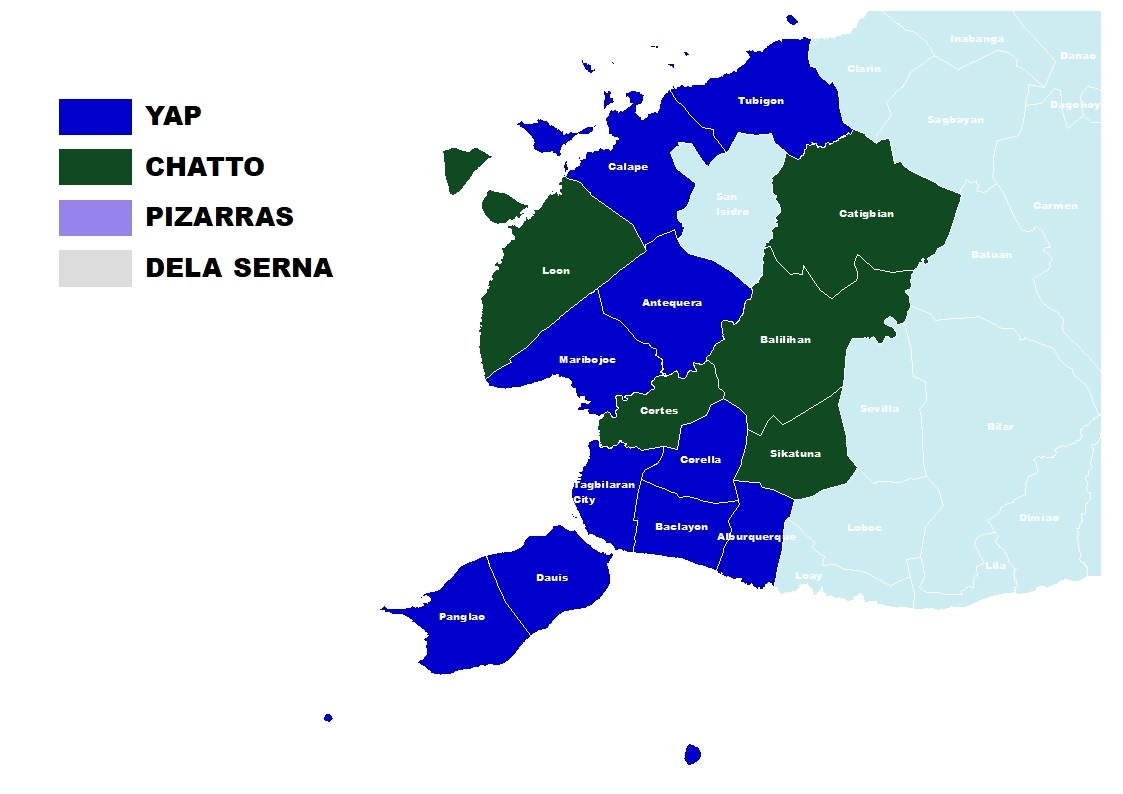
2025 Bohol's First District Congressional Election Results

- City: Tagbilaran City
- Municipalities: Alburquerque, Antequera, Baclayon, Balilihan, Calape, Catigbian, Corella, Cortes, Dauis, Loon, Maribojoc, Panglao, Sikatuna, Tubigon

Incumbent Edgar Chatto (NUP) bid for his third consecutive term. He was challenged by former Tagbilaran city mayor John Geesnell Yap (LDP) and seasoned lawyer Jordan Pizarras (Aksyon).

Abante Bohol endorsed John Geesnell Yap elected congressman and won against Chatto, ending latter's 45 years of uninterrupted political seat.

Philippine House of Representatives election at Bohol's 1st district
Party	Candidate	Votes	%
LDP	John Geesnell Yap	130,661	45.00%
NUP	Edgardo Chatto	105,187	36.23%
Aksyon	Jordan Pizarras	41,841	14.41%
Independent	Marybelle dela Serna	1,282	0.44%
Valid ballots		278,971	96.08%
Invalid or blank votes		11,394	3.92%
Total votes		290,365	100.00%

=== Second district ===
- City: none
- Municipalities: Bien Unido, Buenavista, Clarin, Dagohoy, Danao, Getafe, Inabanga, Pres. Carlos P. Garcia, Sagbayan, San Isidro, San Miguel, Talibon, Trinidad, Ubay

Incumbent Vanvan Aumentado (Lakas–CMD) was reelected.

Philippine House of Representatives election at Bohol's 2nd district
Party	Candidate	Votes	%
Lakas	Ma. Vanessa Cadorna-Aumentado	187,719	65.80%
Liberal	Modesto Membreve	50,308	17.63%
Valid ballots		238,027	83.43%
Invalid or blank votes		47,278	16.57%
Total votes		285,305	100.00%

=== Third district ===
- City: none
- Municipalities: Alicia, Anda, Batuan, Bilar, Candijay, Carmen, Dimiao, Duero, Garcia Hernandez, Guindulman, Jagna, Lila, Loay, Loboc, Mabini, Pilar, Sevilla, Sierra Bullones, Valencia

Incumbent Kristine Alexie Besas-Tutor (Lakas–CMD) was reelected for her third consecutive term.

Philippine House of Representatives election at Bohol's 3rd district
Party	Candidate	Votes	%
Lakas	Kristine Alexie Besas-Tutor	184,280	64.44%
Liberal	Mc Aldous Castañares	70,849	24.77%
Valid ballots		255,129	89.21%
Invalid or blank votes		30,856	10.79%
Total votes		285,985	100.00%

== City and municipal elections ==
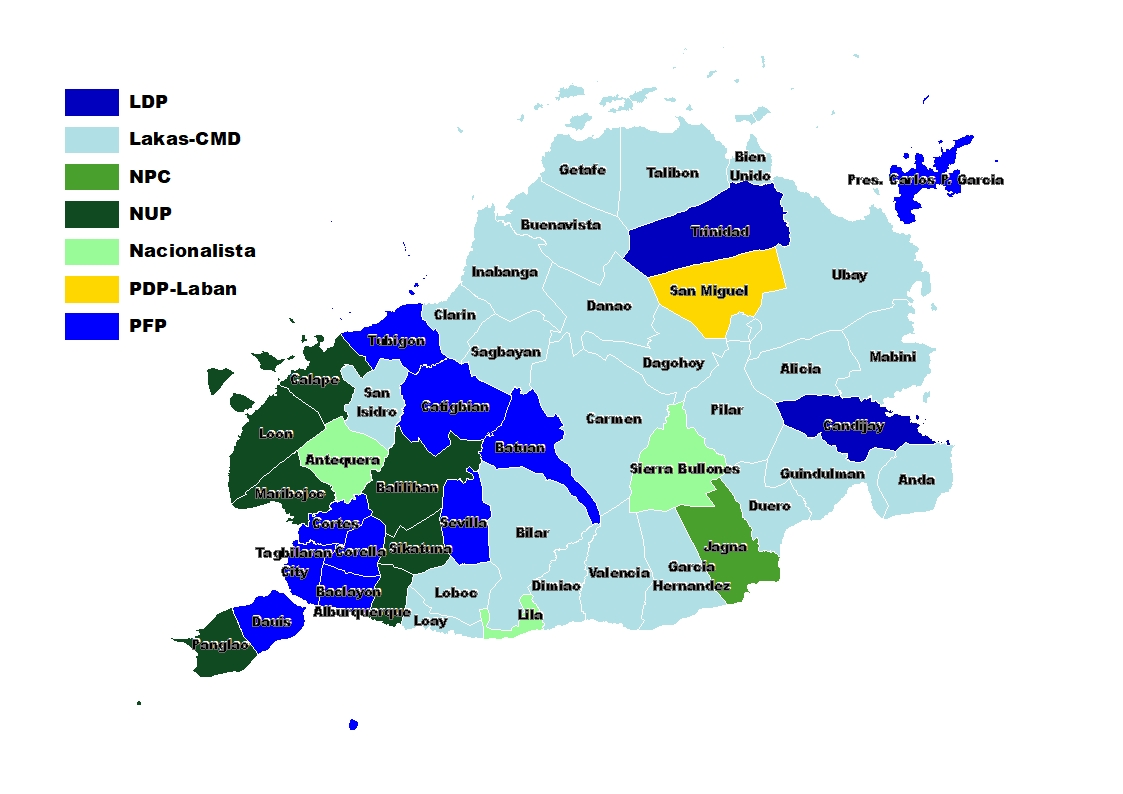
2025 Bohol's City and Municipal Election Results

All municipalities of Bohol and Tagbilaran City elected mayors, vice-mayors and councilors this election. The mayor and vice mayor with the highest number of votes win the seat; they are voted separately, therefore, they may be of different parties when elected.

=== First District ===
==== Alburquerque ====
- Electorate (2025): 8,039 Rank: 44/48
- Turnout (2025): 7,181 (89.33%) Rank: 17/48

Incumbents Don Ritchie Buates and Dagohoy Samar were reelected.

Alburquerque Mayoral Election
Party	Candidate	Votes	%
NUP	Don Ritchie Buates	4,829	67.25%
PFP	Michael Mantiza	1,251	17.42%
Independent	Elias Jipos	833	11.60%
Valid ballots		6,913	96.27%
Invalid or blank votes		268	3.73%
Total votes		7,181	100.00%

Alburquerque Vice Mayoral Election
Party	Candidate	Votes	%
PFP	Dagohoy Samar	4,026	56.06%
NUP	Jose Dompol	2,779	38.70%
Valid ballots		6,805	94.76%
Invalid or blank votes		376	5.24%
Total votes		7,181	100.00%

==== Antequera ====
- Electorate (2025): 10,559 Rank: 42/48
- Turnout (2025): 9,668 (91.56%) Rank: 1/48

Both incumbents Jose Mario Pahang and Cecelia Rebosura-Salomon were reelected.

Antequera has the highest voter turnout in the province with 91.56%.

Antequera Mayoral Election
Party	Candidate	Votes	%
Nacionalista	Jose Mario Pahang	4,320	44.68%
NUP	Lilioso Nunag	3,953	40.89%
Independent	Samuel Amet Rebosura	1,104	11.42%
Valid ballots		9,377	96.99%
Invalid or blank votes		291	3.01%
Total votes		9,668	100.00%

Antequera Vice Mayoral Election
Party	Candidate	Votes	%
NUP	Cecelia Rebosura-Salomon	6,187	63.99%
PFP	Austin Nicole Canini	2,801	28.97%
Valid ballots		8,988	92.97%
Invalid or blank votes		680	7.03%
Total votes		9,668	100.00%

==== Baclayon ====
- Electorate (2025): 14,164 Rank: 33/48
- Turnout (2025): 12,555 (88.64%) Rank: 23/48

Incumbent Alvin Uy was reelected. Meanwhile, incumbent vice-mayor Romulo Balangkig was term-limited.

Baclayon Mayoral Election
Party	Candidate	Votes	%
PFP	Alvin Uy	7,885	62.80%
NUP	Derwin Cuajao	4,249	33.84%
Valid ballots		12,134	96.65%
Invalid or blank votes		421	3.35%
Total votes		12,555	100.00%

Baclayon Vice Mayoral Election
Party	Candidate	Votes	%
PFP	Jodel Theodore Cabahug	6,826	54.37%
NUP	Benecio Uy	5,224	41.61%
Valid ballots		12,050	95.98%
Invalid or blank votes		505	4.02%
Total votes		12,555	100.00%

==== Balilihan ====
- Electorate (2025): 15,251 Rank: 29/48
- Turnout (2025): 13,815 (90.58%) Rank: 7/48

Incumbent mayor Maria Pureza Veloso-Chatto was term-limited, she ran for councilor and won. Her daughter and incumbent vice mayor Esther Patrisha Chatto elected as new mayor.

Balilihan Mayoral Election
Party	Candidate	Votes	%
NUP	Esther Patrisha Chatto	8,930	64.64%
PFP	Adonis Roy Olalo	4,548	32.92%
Valid ballots		13,478	97.56%
Invalid or blank votes		337	2.44%
Total votes		13,815	100.00%

Balilihan Vice Mayoral Election
Party	Candidate	Votes	%
NUP	Lorenzo Baliong Jr.	8,240	59.65%
PFP	Czarina Torregosa Asunto	4,370	31.63%
Valid ballots		12,610	91.28%
Invalid or blank votes		1,205	8.72%
Total votes		13,815	100.00%

==== Calape ====
- Electorate (2025): 23,428 Rank: 13/48
- Turnout (2025): 21,411 (91.39%) Rank: 4/48

Incumbent vice-mayor Sulpicio Yu Jr. unseated incumbent mayor Julius Caesar Herrera.

Calape Mayoral Election
Party	Candidate	Votes	%
NUP	Sulpicio Yu Jr.	11,688	54.59%
PFP	Julius Caesar Herrera	9,460	44.18%
Valid ballots		21,148	98.77%
Invalid or blank votes		263	1.23%
Total votes		21,411	100.00%

Calape Vice Mayoral Election
Party	Candidate	Votes	%
PFP	Roldan Damalerio	10,478	48.94%
NUP	Joyce Josol	10,278	48.00%
Valid ballots		20,756	96.94%
Invalid or blank votes		655	3.06%
Total votes		21,411	100.00%

==== Catigbian ====
- Electorate (2025): 16,873 Rank: 27/48
- Turnout (2025): 15,444 (91.53%) Rank: 2/48

Incumbent mayor Elizabeth Mandin-Pace was term-limited. Meanwhile, incumbent vice mayor Esteban Angilan Jr. was reelected.

Catigbian Mayoral Election
Party	Candidate	Votes	%
PFP	Benjie Oliva	8,471	54.85%
PROMDI	Jesus Jaum Jr.	6,563	42.50%
Valid ballots		15,034	97.35%
Invalid or blank votes		410	2.65%
Total votes		15,444	100.00%

Catigbian Vice Mayoral Election
Party	Candidate	Votes	%
NUP	Esteban Angilan Jr.	8,093	52.40%
PROMDI	Joseph Digaum	6,375	41.28%
Valid ballots		14,468	93.68%
Invalid or blank votes		976	6.32%
Total votes		15,444	100.00%

==== Corella ====
- Electorate (2025): 6,397 Rank: 47/48
- Turnout (2025): 5,775 (90.28%) Rank: 9/48

Both incumbents Juan Manuel Lim and Danilo Bandala were reelected. Lim is unopposed.

Corella Mayoral Election
Party	Candidate	Votes	%
PFP	Juan Manuel Lim	4,511	78.11%
Valid ballots		4,511	78.11%
Invalid or blank votes		1,264	21.89%
Total votes		5,775	100.00%

Corella Vice Mayoral Election
Party	Candidate	Votes	%
PFP	Danilo Bandala	2,820	48.83%
Independent	Judylinda Sarmiento	2,720	47.10%
Valid ballots		5,540	95.93%
Invalid or blank votes		235	4.07%
Total votes		5,775	100.00%

==== Cortes ====
- Electorate (2025): 12,359 Rank: 39/48
- Turnout (2025): 11,232 (90.88%) Rank: 6/48

Incumbent mayor Lynn Iven Lim was term-limited. Incumbent vice-mayor Rodrigo Dennis Uy ran for mayor and won.

Rodrigo Dennis Uy defeated mayoral candidate Ira Lim edging only of 7 votes, the narrowest margin of victory in the province.

Cortes Mayoral Election
Party	Candidate	Votes	%
PFP	Rodrigo Dennis Uy	5,467	48.67%
NUP	Lois Ira Lim	5,460	48.61%
Valid ballots		10,927	97.28%
Invalid or blank votes		305	2.72%
Total votes		11,232	100.00%

Cortes Vice Mayoral Election
Party	Candidate	Votes	%
PFP	Niño Lumanas	6,380	56.80%
NUP	Alan Pondoc	4,380	39.00%
Valid ballots		10,760	95.80%
Invalid or blank votes		472	4.20%
Total votes		11,232	100.00%

==== Dauis ====
- Electorate (2025): 32,679 Rank: 7/48
- Turnout (2025): 29,204 (89.37%) Rank: 15/48

Incumbent vice mayor Marietta Tocmo-Sumaylo unseated incumbent mayor Roman Bullen.

Dauis Mayoral Election
Party	Candidate	Votes	%
PFP	Marietta Tocmo-Sumaylo	21,750	74.48%
NUP	Roman Bullen	6,559	22.46%
Valid ballots		28,309	96.94%
Invalid or blank votes		895	3.06%
Total votes		29,204	100.00%

Dauis Vice Mayoral Election
Party	Candidate	Votes	%
NUP	Marie Nickie Delgado	15,084	51.65%
PFP	Luciano Bongalos	12,857	44.02%
Valid ballots		27,941	95.68%
Invalid or blank votes		1,263	4.32%
Total votes		29,204	100.00%

==== Loon ====
- Electorate (2025): 30,645 Rank: 8/48
- Turnout (2025): 27,349 (89.24%) Rank: 18/48

Both incumbents Elvi Peter Relampagos and Lloyd Peter Lopez were term-limited.

Loon Mayoral Election
Party	Candidate	Votes	%
NUP	Cesar Tomas Lopez	13,491	49.33%
PFP	Ana Lisa Orcullo Go	13,152	48.09%
Valid ballots		26,643	97.42%
Invalid or blank votes		706	2.58%
Total votes		27,349	100.00%

Loon Vice Mayoral Election
Party	Candidate	Votes	%
NUP	Pedro Literatus, Jr.	13,348	48.81%
PFP	Rose Lacierda	9,690	35.43%
Aksyon	Mary Jocelyn Nazareno	2,434	8.90%
Valid ballots		25,472	93.14%
Invalid or blank votes		1,877	6.86%
Total votes		27,349	100.00%

==== Maribojoc ====
- Electorate (2025): 14,952 Rank: 30/48
- Turnout (2025): 13,491 (90.23%) Rank: 10/48

Incumbents Romulo Manuta and Emilio Castilla ran for reelection. Castilla was reelected but Manuta was unsuccessful.

Maribojoc Mayoral Election
Party	Candidate	Votes	%
NUP	Jonathan Rojas	4,851	35.96%
Independent	Jose Arocha	4,347	32.22%
PDP–Laban	Romulo Manuta	3,698	27.41%
Independent	Lourdes Concepcion Endo	192	1.42%
Valid ballots		13,088	97.01%
Invalid or blank votes		403	2.99%
Total votes		13,491	100.00%

Maribojoc Vice Mayoral Election
Party	Candidate	Votes	%
PFP	Emilio Castilla	6,659	49.36%
NUP	Arnulfo Doverte Turco Jr.	5,915	43.84%
Valid ballots		12,574	93.20%
Invalid or blank votes		917	6.80%
Total votes		13,491	100.00%

==== Panglao ====
- Electorate (2025): 29,494 Rank: 9/48
- Turnout (2025): 24,228 (82.15%) Rank: 46/48

Incumbent mayor Edgardo Arcay won against vice mayor Noel Hormachuelos.

Panglao Mayoral Election
Party	Candidate	Votes	%
NUP	Edgardo Arcay	11,910	49.16%
Liberal	Leonila Paredes-Montero	8,517	35.15%
PFP	Noel Hormachuelos	2,085	8.61%
PRP	Briccio Velasco	855	3.53%
Independent	Alexis Ting	148	0.61%
Independent	Aaron Beltran	29	0.12%
Valid ballots		23,544	97.18%
Invalid or blank votes		684	2.82%
Total votes		24,228	100.00%

Panglao Vice Mayoral Election
Party	Candidate	Votes	%
NUP	Daisy Delamcaba	14,148	58.40%
Liberal	Dennis Hora	6,015	24.83%
PROMDI	Doloreich Dumaluan	2,710	11.19%
Valid ballots		22,873	94.41%
Invalid or blank votes		1,355	5.59%
Total votes		24,228	100.00%

==== Sikatuna ====
- Electorate (2025): 5,316 Rank: 48/48
- Turnout (2025): 4,846 (91.16%) Rank: 5/48

Both incumbents Justiniana Ellorimo and Olimpio Calimpusan ran and reelected unopposed. Despite having the lowest number of electorate, Sikatuna has one of the highest voter turnout at 91.16%.

Sikatuna Mayoral Election
Party	Candidate	Votes	%
NUP	Justiniana Ellorimo	4,018	82.91%
Valid ballots		4,018	82.91%
Invalid or blank votes		828	17.09%
Total votes		4,846	100.00%

Sikatuna Vice Mayoral Election
Party	Candidate	Votes	%
NUP	Olimpio Calimpusan	4,092	84.44%
Valid ballots		4,092	84.44%
Invalid or blank votes		754	15.56%
Total votes		4,846	100.00%

==== Tagbilaran City ====
- Electorate (2025): 74,277 Rank: 1/48
- Turnout (2025): 64,302 (86.57%) Rank: 38/48

Incumbent mayor Jane Cajes Yap was challenged by incumbent city councilor Malvin Misael Atoy Torralba. Meanwhile, vice-mayor Jose Antonio Veloso tried a political comeback against the incumbent Adam Relson Jala.

Cajes-Yap and Jala were reelected.

Tagbilaran City Mayoral Election
Party	Candidate	Votes	%
PFP	Jane Cajes Yap	37,715	58.65%
PRP	Malvin Misael Torralba	25,246	39.26%
Valid ballots		62,961	97.91%
Invalid or blank votes		1,341	2.09%
Total votes		64,302	100.00%

Tagbilaran City Vice Mayoral Election
Party	Candidate	Votes	%
Nacionalista	Adam Relson Jala	37,499	58.32%
NUP	Jose Antonio Veloso	16,310	25.36%
Aksyon	Geneson Balbin	6,987	10.87%
Valid ballots		60,796	94.55%
Invalid or blank votes		3,506	5.45%
Total votes		64,302	100.00%

==== Tubigon ====
- Electorate (2025): 33,429 Rank: 6/48
- Turnout (2025): 29,864 (89.34%) Rank: 16/48

Incumbent mayor William Richard Jao was term-limited. Incumbent vice-mayor Renato Villaber ran for mayor but unsuccessful

Tubigon Mayoral Election
Party	Candidate	Votes	%
PFP	Marlon Amila	16,448	55.08%
NUP	Renato Villaber	12,818	42.92%
Valid ballots		29,266	98.00%
Invalid or blank votes		598	2.00%
Total votes		29,864	100.00%

Tubigon Vice Mayoral Election
Party	Candidate	Votes	%
NUP	Delia Lasco	15,702	52.58%
PFP	Lord Ronald Batausa Vaño	12,002	40.19%
Valid ballots		27,704	92.77%
Invalid or blank votes		2,160	7.23%
Total votes		29,864	100.00%

=== Second District ===
==== Bien Unido ====
Incumbent mayor Rene Borenaga bid reelection but unsuccessful. Meanwhile, incumbent vice mayor Renato Hoylar didn't file any candidacy.

Bien Unido Mayoral Election
Party	Candidate	Votes	%
Lakas	John Felix Garcia	8,296	49.29%
LDP	Rene Borenaga	7,710	45.81%
Liberal	Joselyn Villarias	120	0.71%
Valid ballots		16,126	95.82%
Invalid or blank votes		704	4.18%
Total votes		16,830	100.00%

Bien Unido Vice Mayoral Election
Party	Candidate	Votes	%
LDP	Leonardo Querubin Jr.	10,407	61.84%
Lakas	Veer Angelo Autida	5,231	31.08%
Valid ballots		15,638	92.92%
Invalid or blank votes		1,192	7.08%
Total votes		16,830	100.00%

==== Buenavista ====
- Electorate (2025): 22,943 Rank: 14/48
- Turnout (2025): 19,612 (85.48%) Rank: 42/48

Incumbents Dave Duallo and Elsa Tirol were reelected.

Buenavista Mayoral Election
Party	Candidate	Votes	%
Lakas	Dave Duallo	15,651	79.80%
Independent	Ramil Melencion	2,100	10.71%
Valid ballots		17,751	90.51%
Invalid or blank votes		1,861	9.49%
Total votes		19,612	100.00%

Buenavista Vice Mayoral Election
Party	Candidate	Votes	%
Lakas	Elsa Tirol	14,809	75.51%
Independent	Anatalio Pacaldo Jr	1,781	9.08%
Valid ballots		16,590	84.59%
Invalid or blank votes		3,022	15.41%
Total votes		19,612	100.00%

==== Clarin ====
- Electorate (2025): 16,673 Rank: 28/48
- Turnout (2025): 13,643 (81.83%) Rank: 47/48

Incumbents Eugeniano Ibarra and Fernando Camacho Jr. ran and reelected unopposed.

Clarin Mayoral Election
Party	Candidate	Votes	%
Lakas	Eugeniano Ibarra	9,642	70.67%
Valid ballots		9,642	70.67%
Invalid or blank votes		4,001	29.33%
Total votes		13,643	100.00%

Clarin Vice Mayoral Election
Party	Candidate	Votes	%
Lakas	Fernando Camacho Jr.	10,002	73.31%
Valid ballots		10,002	73.31%
Invalid or blank votes		3,641	26.69%
Total votes		13,643	100.00%

==== Dagohoy ====
- Electorate (2025): 14,027 Rank: 35/48
- Turnout (2025): 12,584 (89.71%) Rank: 13/48

Both incumbents Germinio Relampagos and Roel Lagroma bid reelections but unsuccessful.

Dagohoy Mayoral Election
Party	Candidate	Votes	%
Lakas	Sofronio Apat	6,640	52.77%
NUP	Germinio Relampagos	5,691	45.22%
Valid ballots		12,331	97.99%
Invalid or blank votes		253	2.01%
Total votes		12,584	100.00%

Dagohoy Vice Mayoral Election
Party	Candidate	Votes	%
Lakas	Vicente Lanoy Jr.	6,308	50.13%
NPC	Roel Lagroma	5,770	45.85%
Valid ballots		12,078	95.98%
Invalid or blank votes		506	4.02%
Total votes		12,584	100.00%

==== Danao ====
- Electorate (2025): 14,409 Rank: 32/48
- Turnout (2025): 12,808 (88.89%) Rank: 21/48

Incumbents Jose Cepedoza and Albert Vitor are term-limited. Cepedoza ran and won vice-mayor unopposed.

Danao Mayoral Election
Party	Candidate	Votes	%
Lakas	Ma. Celeste Lerion	8,856	69.14%
Independent	Rey Bantilan	3,297	25.74%
Valid ballots		12,153	94.89%
Invalid or blank votes		655	5.11%
Total votes		12,808	100.00%

Danao Vice Mayoral Election
Party	Candidate	Votes	%
Lakas	Jose Cepedoza	9,044	70.61%
Valid ballots		9,044	70.61%
Invalid or blank votes		3,764	29.39%
Total votes		12,808	100.00%

==== Getafe ====
- Electorate (2025): 22,773 Rank: 15/48
- Turnout (2025): 18,463 (81.07%) Rank: 48/48

Brothers and incumbents Cary and Casey Shaun Camacho were reelected unopposed.

Getafe Mayoral Election
Party	Candidate	Votes	%
Lakas	Cary Camacho	16,287	88.21%
Valid ballots		16,287	88.21%
Invalid or blank votes		2,176	11.79%
Total votes		18,463	100.00%

Getafe Vice Mayoral Election
Party	Candidate	Votes	%
Lakas	Casey Shaun Camacho	15,800	85.58%
Valid ballots		15,800	85.58%
Invalid or blank votes		2,663	14.42%
Total votes		18,463	100.00%

==== Inabanga ====
Incumbents son-and-mother tandem, Jono and Roygie Jumamoy bid another reelection. They were challenged by Dexter Ancla and Hermogenes Cenabre Jr. (Lakas-CMD) of Abante Bohol coalition. Both Ancla and Cenabre won, ending Jumamoy's political dominance of nearly 40 years.

Inabanga Mayoral Election
Party	Candidate	Votes	%
Lakas	Dexter Ancla	16,958	55.35%
NUP	Jose Jono Jumamoy	12,959	42.30%
Valid ballots		29,917	97.65%
Invalid or blank votes		721	2.35%
Total votes		30,638	100.00%

Inabanga Vice Mayoral Election
Party	Candidate	Votes	%
Lakas	Hermogenes Cenabre Jr.	15,911	51.93%
NUP	Roygie Ching-Jumamoy	11,984	39.11%
Independent	Ronnie Cenabre	1,176	3.84%
Valid ballots		29,071	94.89%
Invalid or blank votes		1,567	5.11%
Total votes		30,638	100.00%

==== Pres. Carlos P. Garcia ====
- Electorate (2025): 17,356 Rank: 25/48
- Turnout (2025): 14,646 (84.39%) Rank: 44/48

Incumbent mayor Fernando Estavilla was term-limited, he ran for 2nd district board member seat and won. Incumbent vice mayor Wilma Cruz Dusal was reelected.

Pres. Carlos P. Garcia Mayoral Election
Party	Candidate	Votes	%
PFP	Kenneth Estavilla	7,493	51.16%
Independent	Vic Cutamora	6,635	45.30%
Valid ballots		14,128	96.46%
Invalid or blank votes		518	3.54%
Total votes		14,646	100.00%

Pres. Carlos P. Garcia Vice Mayoral Election
Party	Candidate	Votes	%
NPC	Wilma Cruz Dusal	8,258	56.38%
Independent	Audi Solon	3,362	22.96%
Valid ballots		11,620	79.34%
Invalid or blank votes		3,026	20.66%
Total votes		14,646	100.00%

==== Sagbayan ====
- Electorate (2025): 17,494 Rank: 24/48
- Turnout (2025): 14,818 (84.70%) Rank: 43/48

Incumbents Restituto Suarez III and Asuncion Bautista-Ybañez were reelected unopposed.

Sagbayan Mayoral Election
Party	Candidate	Votes	%
Lakas	Restituto Suarez III	12,355	83.38%
Valid ballots		12,355	83.38%
Invalid or blank votes		2,463	16.62%
Total votes		14,818	100.00%

Sagbayan Vice Mayoral Election
Party	Candidate	Votes	%
Lakas	Asuncion Bautista Ybañez	12,429	83.88%
Valid ballots		12,429	83.88%
Invalid or blank votes		2,389	16.12%
Total votes		14,818	100.00%

==== San Isidro ====
- Electorate (2025): 7,407 Rank: 46/48
- Turnout (2025): 6,665 (89.98%) Rank: 11/48

Incumbent mayor Diosdado Gementiza Jr. was reelected. Meanwhile incumbent vice mayor Filemon Mantabote was term-limited. His political party nominated Jorge Cosmod and won.

San Isidro Mayoral Election
Party	Candidate	Votes	%
Lakas	Diosdado Gementiza Jr.	5,754	86.33%
Independent	Antonio Agocoy Jr.	421	6.32%
Valid ballots		6,175	92.65%
Invalid or blank votes		490	7.35%
Total votes		6,665	100.00%

San Isidro Vice Mayoral Election
Party	Candidate	Votes	%
Lakas	Jorge Cosmod	3,320	49.81%
Independent	Frederick Samuya	3,051	45.78%
Valid ballots		6,371	95.59%
Invalid or blank votes		294	4.41%
Total votes		6,665	100.00%

==== San Miguel ====
- Electorate (2025): 18,216 Rank: 22/48
- Turnout (2025): 16,333 (89.66%) Rank: 14/48

Incumbent mayor Ian Gil Mendez defeated incumbent vice-mayor Faustino Bulaga.

San Miguel Mayoral Election
Party	Candidate	Votes	%
PDP–Laban	Ian Gil Mendez	8,464	51.82%
Lakas	Faustino Bulaga	7,560	46.29%
Valid ballots		16,024	98.11%
Invalid or blank votes		309	1.89%
Total votes		16,333	100.00%

San Miguel Vice Mayoral Election
Party	Candidate	Votes	%
Lakas	June Reign Reyes	8,904	54.52%
NPC	Claudio Bonior	6,435	39.40%
Valid ballots		15,339	93.91%
Invalid or blank votes		994	6.09%
Total votes		16,333	100.00%

==== Talibon ====
- Electorate (2025): 45,197 Rank: 3/48
- Turnout (2025): 40,321 (89.21%) Rank: 20/48

Incumbents Janette Garcia and Dave Evangelista were reelected. Evangelista won unopposed.

Talibon Mayoral Election
Party	Candidate	Votes	%
Lakas	Janette Garcia	18,725	46.44%
PRP	Jaypee Flores	11,861	29.42%
NUP	Gerson Artiaga	8,528	21.15%
Valid ballots		39,114	97.01%
Invalid or blank votes		1,207	2.99%
Total votes		40,321	100.00%

Talibon Vice Mayoral Election
Party	Candidate	Votes	%
Lakas	Dave Evangelista	27,782	68.90%
Valid ballots		27,782	68.90%
Invalid or blank votes		12,539	31.10%
Total votes		40,321	100.00%

==== Trinidad ====
- Electorate (2025): 24,564 Rank: 10/48
- Turnout (2025): 21,753 (88.56%) Rank: 25/48

Incumbent mayor Roberto Cajes defeated incumbent vice mayor Fernando Erio.

Trinidad Mayoral Election
Party	Candidate	Votes	%
LDP	Roberto Cajes	12,345	56.75%
Lakas	Fernando Erio	9,048	41.59%
Valid ballots		21,393	98.35%
Invalid or blank votes		360	1.65%
Total votes		21,753	100.00%

Trinidad Vice Mayoral Election
Party	Candidate	Votes	%
NPC	Joan Robie Cajes-Imboy	13,281	61.05%
Lakas	Deuel Puracan	7,712	35.45%
Valid ballots		20,993	96.51%
Invalid or blank votes		760	3.49%
Total votes		21,753	100.00%

==== Ubay ====
- Electorate (2025): 53,114 Rank: 2/48
- Turnout (2025): 46,191 (86.97%) Rank: 36/48

Incumbents mayor Constantino Reyes and vice mayor Victor Bonghanoy were term limited. They tried to switch their electoral seats. Reyes won but not Bonghanoy.

Ubay Mayoral Election
Party	Candidate	Votes	%
Lakas	Violeta Diangco-Reyes	20,968	45.39%
PDP–Laban	Eutiquio Bernales Jr.	13,857	30.00%
RP	Victor Bonghanoy	7,387	15.99%
Independent	Arnold Bacolod	546	1.18%
Independent	Marita Tabañag-Inojales	346	0.75%
WPP	Jieblando Mendez	240	6.16%
Valid ballots		43,344	93.84%
Invalid or blank votes		2,847	6.16%
Total votes		46,191	100.00%

Ubay Vice Mayoral Election
Party	Candidate	Votes	%
Lakas	Constantino Reyes	30,104	65.17%
RP	Maximo Boyles Jr.	10,974	23.76%
Valid ballots		41,078	88.93%
Invalid or blank votes		5,113	11.07%
Total votes		46,191	100.00%

Ubay Municipal Council Election
Party	Candidate	Votes	%
Lakas	Kim Geronimo Fuentes	25,869	56.00%
Lakas	Daniel Rodriguez Delima II	24,869	53.84%
Independent	Vincent Maximilian Entero	23,621	51.14%
Independent	Facundo Gavas Jr.	22,535	48.79%
Lakas	Efren Sumalinog Tanjay	19,990	43.28%
RP	Isidore Gaviola Besas	17,871	38.69%
Lakas	Glaiza Mae Atuel-Revilla	17,829	38.60%
RP	Galicano Escolano Atup	13,947	30.19%
Independent	Nador Alacida Vallecera	12,363	26.76%
Independent	Diominidico Reyes Butawan	10,642	23.04%
Lakas	Christopher Oclarit Villadores	9,914	21.46%
RP	Judith Boaquin-Palgan	9,669	20.93%
Lakas	Mansueto Ibale Diangco	7,721	16.72%
Lakas	Ines William-Abayabay	6,446	13.96%
Independent	Oscar Templa Boyles	5,763	12.48%
Independent	Riche Sagarino-Ibale	4,474	9.69%
RP	Ambrocio Gacasan Dasoc	4,434	9.60%
PDP–Laban	Alberto Boyonas Boiser	4,095	8.87%
Independent	Rosendo Adlawon Razon	4,092	8.86%
Independent	Elvira Bacolod-Cajes	4,006	8.67%
Lakas	Luis Mendez Rotol	3,800	8.23%
PDP–Laban	Rolando Mandin Rosales	3,065	6.64%
PDP–Laban	Reynaldo Rosos Carillas	2,707	5.86%
Independent	Edwin Mendez Reyes	2,684	5.81%
PDP–Laban	Gemma Boyonas-Malinao	2,560	5.54%
Independent	Januaria Miel-Llorente	2,250	4.87%
RP	Edgar Gundayan Boysillo	2,207	4.78%
Independent	Marino Matila Diacor	2,197	4.76%
WPP	Meliton Cabarubias Boyles	2,139	4.63%
WPP	Leonilo Reyes Revilla	2,060	4.46%
Independent	German Diangco Cuyno	1,188	2.57%
RP	Melody Tubo-Orbeso	1,035	2.24%
WPP	Ludegario Cuysona Lopez	622	1.35%
Valid ballots		278,664	75.41%
Invalid or blank votes		11,358	24.59%
Total votes		46,191	100.00%

=== Third District ===
==== Alicia ====
- Electorate (2025): 18,056 Rank: 23/48
- Turnout (2025): 15,954 (88.36%) Rank: 26/48

Incumbent mayor Victoriano Torres III was challenged by incumbent vice mayor Cesyl Balahay for the town's top post. Both are unsuccessful.

Alicia Mayoral Election
Party	Candidate	Votes	%
Lakas	Marciano Ayuban Jr.	5,130	32.15%
PRP	Chito Bersaluna	4,043	25.34%
NPC	Cesyl Lusica Balahay	3,951	24.76%
PDP–Laban	Victoriano Torres III	2,409	15.10%
Valid ballots		15,533	97.36%
Invalid or blank votes		421	2.64%
Total votes		15,954	100.00%

Alicia Vice Mayoral Election
Party	Candidate	Votes	%
Lakas	Ruel Carias	6,188	38.79%
PDP–Laban	Jasmine Molina	5,540	34.72%
NPC	Bryan Bulabos	2,086	13.08%
PRP	Rolando Ayuban	1,149	7.20%
Independent	Danilo Huiso	119	0.75%
Valid ballots		15,082	94.53%
Invalid or blank votes		872	5.47%
Total votes		15,954	100.00%

==== Anda ====
- Electorate (2025): 13,774 Rank: 36/48
- Turnout (2025): 12,132 (88.08%) Rank: 31/48

Incumbent mayor Angelina Blanco Simacio was reelected while incumbent vice mayor Nilo Bersabal was term-limited.

Anda Mayoral Election
Party	Candidate	Votes	%
Lakas	Angelina Blanco Simacio	7,294	60.12%
NPC	Metodio Amper	4,738	39.05%
Valid ballots		12,032	99.18%
Invalid or blank votes		100	0.82%
Total votes		12,132	100.00%

Anda Vice Mayoral Election
Party	Candidate	Votes	%
Lakas	Rubena Castrodes-Porter	7,285	60.05%
NPC	Ferdinand Berongoy	4,546	37.47%
Valid ballots		11,831	97.52%
Invalid or blank votes		301	2.48%
Total votes		12,132	100.00%

==== Batuan ====
- Electorate (2025): 10,601 Rank: 41/48
- Turnout (2025): 9,585 (90.42%) Rank: 8/48

Incumbents Antonino Jumawid was term-limited, he ran for vice mayor and won. Meanwhile, incumbent vice mayor Zeniza Bulalaque ran for mayor but was unsuccessful.

Batuan Mayoral Election
Party	Candidate	Votes	%
PFP	Emmanuel Tumanda	5,750	59.99%
Lakas	Zeniza Bulalaque	3,701	38.61%
Valid ballots		9,451	98.60%
Invalid or blank votes		134	1.40%
Total votes		9,585	100.00%

Batuan Vice Mayoral Election
Party	Candidate	Votes	%
Lakas	Antonio Jumawid	4,872	50.83%
PFP	Julito Pancho	4,558	47.55%
Valid ballots		9,430	98.38%
Invalid or blank votes		155	1.62%
Total votes		9,585	100.00%

==== Bilar ====
- Electorate (2025): 13,738 Rank: 37/48
- Turnout (2025): 12,191 (88.74%) Rank: 22/48

Incumbents Norman Palacio and Ranulfo Maligmat were reelected.

Bilar Mayoral Election
Party	Candidate	Votes	%
Lakas	Norman Palacio	10,391	85.24%
NPC	Celso Dalagan	1,036	8.50%
Valid ballots		11,427	93.73%
Invalid or blank votes		764	6.27%
Total votes		12,191	100.00%

Bilar Vice Mayoral Election
Party	Candidate	Votes	%
Lakas	Ranulfo Maligmat	6,675	54.75%
NPC	Marino Omac	5,117	41.97%
Valid ballots		11,792	96.73%
Invalid or blank votes		399	3.27%
Total votes		12,191	100.00%

==== Candijay ====
- Electorate (2025): 22,114 Rank: 16/48
- Turnout (2025): 18,582 (84.03%) Rank: 45/48

Incumbents Thamar Olaivar and Christopher Tutor were reelected. Olaivar won unopposed.

Candijay Mayoral Election
Party	Candidate	Votes	%
LDP	Thamar Olaivar	15,619	84.05%
Valid ballots		15,619	84.05%
Invalid or blank votes		2,963	15.95%
Total votes		18,582	100.00%

Candijay Vice Mayoral Election
Party	Candidate	Votes	%
Nacionalista	Christopher Tutor	9,422	50.70%
Independent	Edward Pizaña	6,657	35.82%
Valid ballots		16,079	86.53%
Invalid or blank votes		2,503	13.47%
Total votes		18,582	100.00%

==== Carmen ====
- Electorate (2025): 35,223 Rank: 4/48
- Turnout (2025): 30,119 (85.51%) Rank: 41/48

Incumbent mayor Conchita Toribio-delos Reyes reelected unopposed. Her brother, Ricardo also won unopposed for vice-mayor.

Carmen Mayoral Election
Party	Candidate	Votes	%
Lakas	Conchita Toribio-delos Reyes	21,705	72.06%
Valid ballots		21,705	72.06%
Invalid or blank votes		8,414	27.94%
Total votes		30,119	100.00%

Carmen Vice Mayoral Election
Party	Candidate	Votes	%
Lakas	Ricardo Francisco Toribio	21,530	71.48%
Valid ballots		21,530	71.48%
Invalid or blank votes		8,589	28.52%
Total votes		30,119	100.00%

==== Dimiao ====
- Electorate (2025): 11,129 Rank: 40/48
- Turnout (2025): 9,811 (88.16%) Rank: 29/48

Incumbent mayor Randolph Ang was reelected. Incumbent vice mayor Jessie Paluga didn't file candidacy.

Dimiao Mayoral Election
Party	Candidate	Votes	%
Lakas	Randolph Ang	5,988	61.03%
Independent	Catherine Lumen-Guivencan	3,691	37.62%
Valid ballots		9,679	98.65%
Invalid or blank votes		132	1.35%
Total votes		9,811	100.00%

Dimiao Vice Mayoral Election
Party	Candidate	Votes	%
Lakas	Noel Hamlag	5,121	52.20%
Independent	Robert Taguisa	4,358	44.42%
Valid ballots		9,479	96.62%
Invalid or blank votes		332	3.38%
Total votes		9,811	100.00%

==== Duero ====
- Electorate (2025): 14,421 Rank: 31/48
- Turnout (2025): 12,658 (87.77%) Rank: 32/48

Incumbents Al Taculad and Hernes Bajao won reelections.

Duero Mayoral Election
Party	Candidate	Votes	%
Lakas	Al Taculad	6,247	49.35%
NPC	Emma Fe Peligro-Bajade	6,099	48.18%
Valid ballots		12,346	97.54%
Invalid or blank votes		312	2.46%
Total votes		12,658	100.00%

Duero Vice Mayoral Election
Party	Candidate	Votes	%
Lakas	Hernes Bajao	6,220	49.14%
NPC	Jeffrey Torralba	5,777	45.64%
Valid ballots		11,997	94.78%
Invalid or blank votes		661	5.22%
Total votes		12,658	100.00%

==== Garcia Hernandez ====
- Electorate (2025): 17,183 Rank: 26/48
- Turnout (2025): 14,922 (86.84%) Rank: 37/48

Incumbents Jess Baja and Antonia Ladaga won reelections.

Garcia Hernandez Mayoral Election
Party	Candidate	Votes	%
Lakas	Filadelfo Jess Baja III	7,867	52.72%
NPC	Jone Jade Acapulco Bautista	6,715	45.00%
Valid ballots		14,582	97.72%
Invalid or blank votes		340	2.28%
Total votes		14,922	100.00%

Garcia Hernandez Vice Mayoral Election
Party	Candidate	Votes	%
Lakas	Antonia Ladaga	8,346	55.93%
NPC	Mary Rose Edubas	6,007	40.26%
Valid ballots		14,353	96.19%
Invalid or blank votes		569	3.81%
Total votes		14,922	100.00%

==== Guindulman ====
- Electorate (2025): 24,399 Rank: 12/48
- Turnout (2025): 21,115 (86.54%) Rank: 39/48

Incumbent mayor Albino Balo won reelection. Meanwhile, incumbent vice mayor Maria Fe Añana Piezas didn't file candidacy.

Guindulman Mayoral Election
Party	Candidate	Votes	%
Lakas	Albino Balo	13,691	64.84%
PROMDI	Sinforiano Lavastida	6,372	30.18%
Independent	Maximilian Lloren	124	0.59%
Valid ballots		20,187	95.61%
Invalid or blank votes		928	4.39%
Total votes		21,115	100.00%

Guindulman Vice Mayoral Election
Party	Candidate	Votes	%
Lakas	Jimmy Busano	4,208	70.32%
NPC	Elsa Bunac Lim	4,208	19.93%
Valid ballots		19,056	90.25%
Invalid or blank votes		2,059	9.75%
Total votes		21,115	100.00%

==== Jagna ====
- Electorate (2025): 24,536 Rank: 11/48
- Turnout (2025): 21,891 (89.22%) Rank: 19/48

Incumbent mayor Joseph Rañola no longer seek for reelection. Incumbent vice mayor Teofisto Pagar Jr. ran for mayor but unsuccessful.

Jagna Mayoral Election
Party	Candidate	Votes	%
NPC	Mark Louie Manungolh	11,299	51.61%
Lakas	Teofisto Pagar Jr.	10,190	46.55%
Valid ballots		21,489	98.16%
Invalid or blank votes		402	1.84%
Total votes		21,891	100.00%

Jagna Vice Mayoral Election
Party	Candidate	Votes	%
NPC	Derrick Virtudazo	11,336	51.78%
Lakas	Wilvinz Viñalon	9,825	44.88%
Valid ballots		21,161	96.67%
Invalid or blank votes		730	3.33%
Total votes		21,891	100.00%

==== Lila ====
- Electorate (2025): 7,910 Rank: 45/48
- Turnout (2025): 6,887 (87.07%) Rank: 35/48

Incumbents Arturo Piollo II and Regina Salazar reelected unopposed.

Lila Mayoral Election
Party	Candidate	Votes	%
Nacionalista	Arturo Piollo II	5,664	82.24%
Valid ballots		5,664	82.24%
Invalid or blank votes		1,223	17.76%
Total votes		6,887	100.00%

Lila Vice Mayoral Election
Party	Candidate	Votes	%
Nacionalista	Regina Salazar	5,534	80.35%
Valid ballots		5,534	80.35%
Invalid or blank votes		1,353	19.65%
Total votes		6,887	100.00%

==== Loay ====
- Electorate (2025): 13,022 Rank: 38/48
- Turnout (2025): 11,473 (88.10%) Rank: 30/48

Incumbent mayor Hilario Ayuban reelected unopposed. While, incumbent vice mayor Rodrigo Cubarol Jr. was term-limited.

Loay Mayoral Election
Party	Candidate	Votes	%
Lakas	Hilario Ayuban	10,368	90.37%
Valid ballots		10,368	90.37%
Invalid or blank votes		1,105	9.63%
Total votes		11,473	100.00%

Loay Vice Mayoral Election
Party	Candidate	Votes	%
Lakas	Tiburcio Bullecer Jr.	9,460	82.45%
Independent	Gabriel Espiritu	647	5.64%
Valid ballots		10,107	88.09%
Invalid or blank votes		1,366	11.91%
Total votes		11,473	100.00%

==== Loboc ====
- Electorate (2025): 14,163 Rank: 34/48
- Turnout (2025): 12,713 (89.76%) Rank: 12/48

Incumbents Raymond Jala and Helen Alaba won reelections.

Loboc Mayoral Election
Party	Candidate	Votes	%
Lakas	Raymond Jala	7,008	55.12%
NPC	Erwin Bacquial	5,580	43.89%
Valid ballots		12,588	99.02%
Invalid or blank votes		125	0.98%
Total votes		12,713	100.00%

Loboc Vice Mayoral Election
Party	Candidate	Votes	%
Lakas	Helen Calipusan-Alaba	7,009	55.13%
NPC	Leo Baguio Jr.	5,365	42.20%
Valid ballots		12,374	97.33%
Invalid or blank votes		339	2.67%
Total votes		12,713	100.00%

==== Mabini ====
- Electorate (2025): 20,406 Rank: 17/48
- Turnout (2025): 18,001 (88.21%) Rank: 28/48

Incumbents Ongie Grace Bernales-Lim and Myra Fostanes Colis won reelections.

Mabini Mayoral Election
Party	Candidate	Votes	%
Lakas	Ongie Grace Bernales-Lim	10,546	58.59%
NUP	Juanito Libres Jayoma	6,894	38.30%
Valid ballots		17,440	96.88%
Invalid or blank votes		561	3.12%
Total votes		18,001	100.00%

Mabini Vice Mayoral Election
Party	Candidate	Votes	%
Lakas	Myra Fostanes Colis	8,867	49.26%
NPC	Helen Natan	8,271	45.95%
Valid ballots		17,138	95.21%
Invalid or blank votes		863	4.79%
Total votes		18,001	100.00%

==== Pilar ====
- Electorate (2025): 20,028 Rank: 18/48
- Turnout (2025): 17,279 (86.27%) Rank: 40/48

Incumbent mayor Wilson Pajo won reelection. Meanwhile, incumbent vice mayor Eugenio Datahan II was term-limited.

Pilar Mayoral Election
Party	Candidate	Votes	%
Lakas	Wilson Pajo	10,939	63.31%
Nacionalista	Francisco Auguis	5,858	33.90%
Valid ballots		16,797	97.21%
Invalid or blank votes		482	2.79%
Total votes		17,279	100.00%

Pilar Vice Mayoral Election
Party	Candidate	Votes	%
Lakas	Wilfredo Bernante	10,852	62.80%
Nacionalista	Zenaido Jaspe	5,207	30.13%
Valid ballots		16,059	92.94%
Invalid or blank votes		1,220	7.06%
Total votes		17,279	100.00%

==== Sevilla ====
- Electorate (2025): 8,236 Rank: 43/48
- Turnout (2025): 7,207 (87.51%) Rank: 33/48

Incumbents Juliet Bucag-Dano and Richard Bucag were both term-limited. Dano ran for vice mayor and won.

Sevilla Mayoral Election
Party	Candidate	Votes	%
PFP	Emmanuel Caberte	6,140	85.19%
Valid ballots		6,140	85.19%
Invalid or blank votes		1,067	14.81%
Total votes		7,207	100.00%

Sevilla Vice Mayoral Election
Party	Candidate	Votes	%
Nacionalista	Juliet Bucag-Dano	4,736	65.71%
Independent	Gabino Gumapac	1,813	25.16%
Valid ballots		6,549	90.87%
Invalid or blank votes		658	9.13%
Total votes		7,207	100.00%

==== Sierra Bullones ====
- Electorate (2025): 18,517 Rank: 21/48
- Turnout (2025): 16,356 (88.33%) Rank: 27/48

Incumbent mayor Michael Doria won over incumbent vice mayor Simplicio Maestrado.

Sierra Bullones Mayoral Election
Party	Candidate	Votes	%
Nacionalista	Michael Doria	9,583	58.59%
Lakas	Simplicio Maestrado	6,230	38.09%
Independent	Ireneo Perocho	52	0.32%
Valid ballots		15,865	97.00%
Invalid or blank votes		491	3.00%
Total votes		16,356	100.00%

Sierra Bullones Vice Mayoral Election
Party	Candidate	Votes	%
Nacionalista	Jose Fredo Buslon	9,673	59.14%
Lakas	Alfredo Gamalo	5,890	36.01%
Valid ballots		15,563	95.15%
Invalid or blank votes		793	4.85%
Total votes		16,356	100.00%

==== Valencia ====
- Electorate (2025): 19,309 Rank: 19/48
- Turnout (2025): 17,109 (88.61%) Rank: 24/48

Incumbents Dionisio Neil Balite and Aristotle Cometa were reelected.

Valencia Mayoral Election
Party	Candidate	Votes	%
Lakas	Dionisio Neil Balite	11,973	69.98%
NPC	Ma. Katrina Lim	4,720	27.59%
Valid ballots		16,693	97.57%
Invalid or blank votes		416	2.43%
Total votes		17,109	100.00%

Valencia Vice Mayoral Election
Party	Candidate	Votes	%
Lakas	Aristotle Cometa	12,072	70.56%
NPC	Mhie Flor Palaca	4,255	24.87%
Valid ballots		16,327	95.43%
Invalid or blank votes		782	4.57%
Total votes		17,109	100.00%
