= San Nicolas Church (Dimiao) =

Roman Catholic church in Bohol, Philippines

- San Nicolas de Tolentino Parish Church
- Dimiao Church
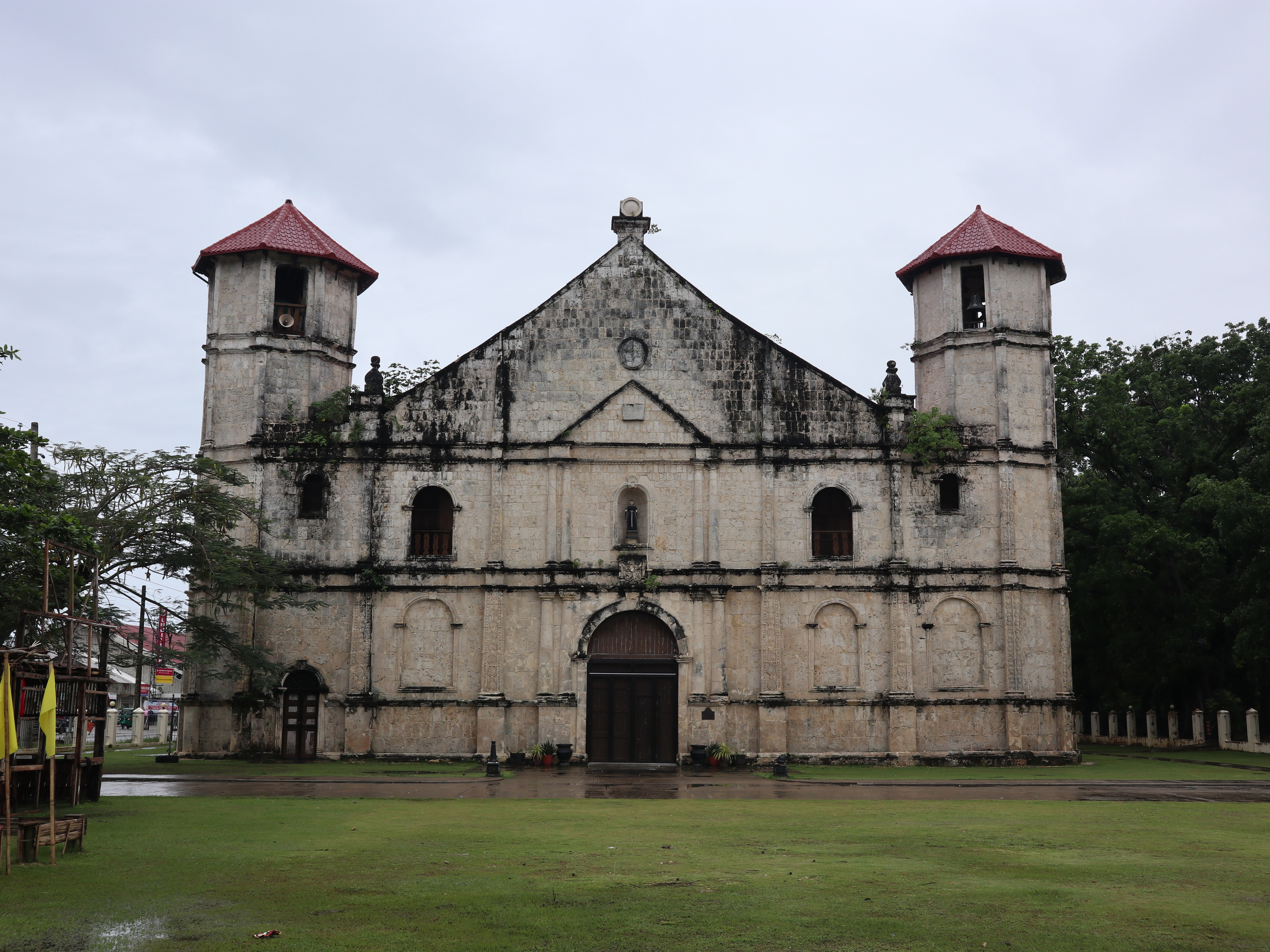
- Church facade in 2023

- Location in the Visayas Location in the Philippines
- 9°36′19″N 124°09′41″E
- Location: Dimiao, Bohol
- Country: Philippines
- Denomination: Roman Catholic

Architecture
- Heritage designation: National Cultural Treasures
- Architectural type: Church building

Administration
- Province: Cebu
- Archdiocese: Cebu
- Diocese: Tagbilaran

San Nicolas de Tolentino Parish Church, commonly known as Dimiao Church, is a Roman Catholic church in Dimiao, Bohol, Philippines. It is under the jurisdiction of the Diocese of Tagbilaran.

Built between 1797 and 1815, the church exhibits characteristics of Baroque architecture with Muslim influence. The church complex is recognized by the National Historical Commission of the Philippines as a National Cultural Treasure. In addition, a side altar from the church was acquired by the National Museum of Fine Arts in the late 1970s and is considered a separate National Cultural Treasure.

The church was damaged by the 2013 Bohol earthquake. By 2018, the church was restored and refurbished by the National Museum.

Polychromed side altar (top and bottom) of the Dimiao Church, now on display at the National Museum of Fine Arts
