= Governor's Mansion (Bohol) =

- Opisyal na Balay Puluy-anan sa Gobernador sa Bohol
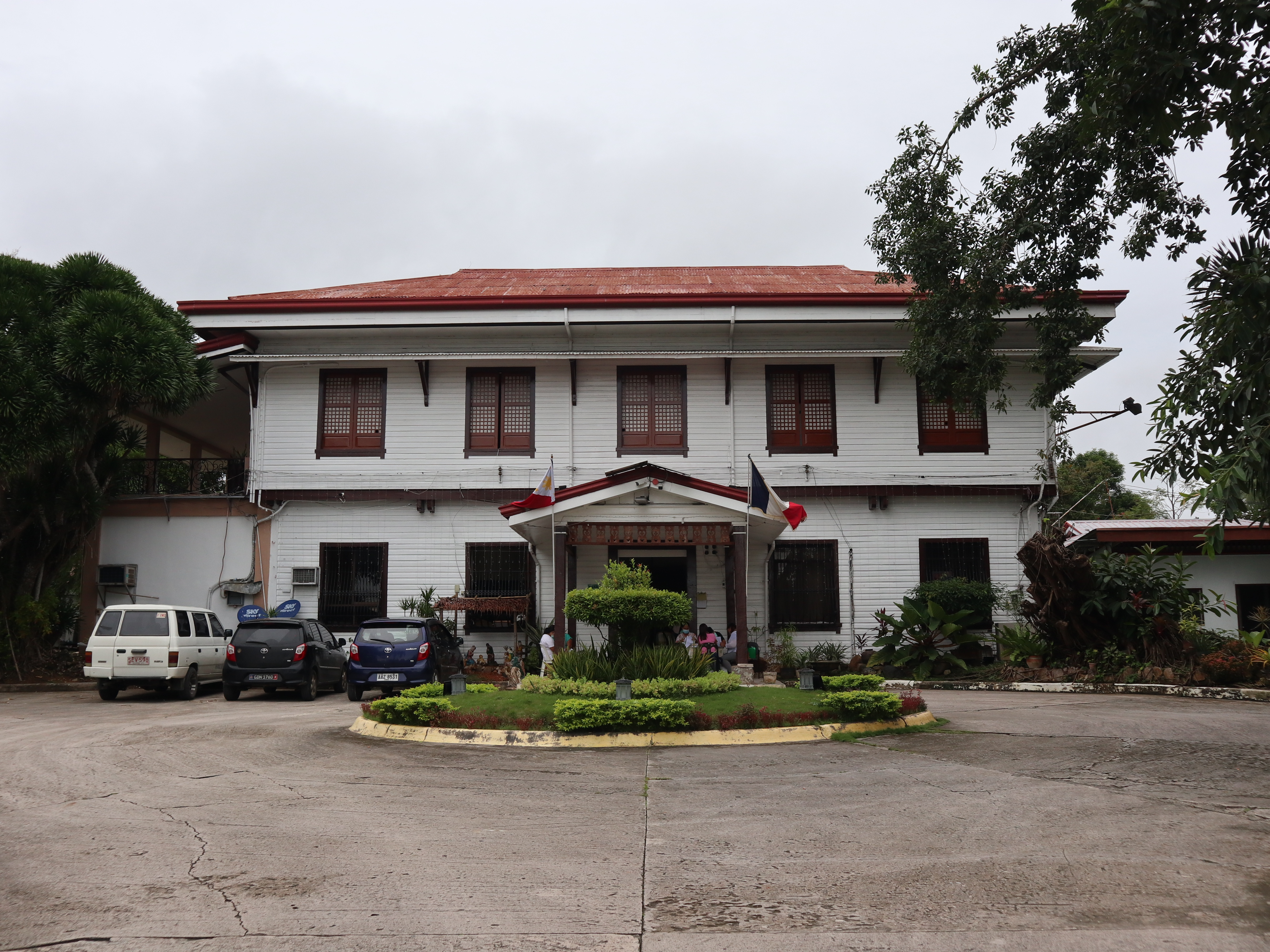
- Interactive map of the Governor's Mansion area
- Alternative names: People's Mansion

General information
- Type: Residence
- Location: CPG Avenue, Cogon District, Tagbilaran City, Bohol, Philippines
- Coordinates: 9°39′08″N 123°51′22″E
- Current tenants: Erico Aristotle Aumentado; Governor of Bohol
- Completed: 1931
- Renovated: 1967
- Owner: Provincial Government of Bohol

Bohol Governor's Mansion, otherwise known as the People's Mansion, is the official residence of the governor of Bohol in the Philippines. Since the 2013 Bohol earthquake, it hosts the office of the governor, as the century-old Capitol is undergoing repairs and earthquake-proofing.

== History ==
Then Governor (later President) Carlos P. Garcia, first conceived the idea of having an official residence under his governorship. He used the facility as his living quarters while in Tagbilaran. As the building was of prominence, it was used by high-ranking officials of the Japanese Imperial Army as their residence during their stay in the province. However, the residence fell into relative disuse after the war, since most governors preferred to commute back to their homes in the capital or hometowns.

It was during the administration of Gov. Lino Chatto that the Governor's Mansion gained prominence. He spearheaded the renovation program that included the addition of lawns and fountains. After the EDSA People Power Revolution, the property was renamed by Gov. David Tirol- the 'People's Mansion'.

== Mansion Office ==
Following the 2013 Bohol earthquake that damaged much of the infrastructures, including the Provincial Capitol, the Governor's Office was moved to the residence with the name reverted back to 'Governor's Mansion'. Gov. Edgar Chatto kept an office in the residence even after the restoration work at the Capitol was completed. The office gained the name "Mansion Office of the Governor" to distinguish itself from the Office of the Governor in the Capitol compound.

== Facilities ==
Bohol Governor's Mansion includes living quarters for the Governor and his family, as well as for the staff and for a token police force stationed there to guard the facility. It includes a working office, a reception hall and a conference room. Presidents of the Philippines also utilize the residence as their own when situated in the province, especially Benigno Aquino III following the Bohol earthquake. The mansion and its surrounding facilities also house the auxiliary offices attached to the Office of the Governor.
