= Jose Antonio Veloso =

Filipino politician

Jose Antonio "Toto" Veloso

Vice Mayor of Tagbilaran
- In office June 30, 2013 – June 30, 2022
- Mayor: Dan Lim; John Geesnell Yap
- Preceded by: Nuevas Montes
- In office June 30, 2007 – June 30, 2010
- Preceded by: Nuevas Montes
- Succeeded by: Nuevas Montes

City Councilor of Tagbilaran
- In office June 30, 2001 – June 30, 2007

Personal details
- Born: Jose Antonio Salera Veloso; June 13, 1960 (age 66) Tagbilaran City, Bohol
- Party: NUP (2024-present)
- Other political affiliations: Aksyon (2021-2024); Liberal (2012-2021); Lakas-CMD (until 2012)
- Education: Holy Name University
- Occupation: Government official
- Profession: Politician, Businessman
- Nickname: Toto Veloso

Jose Antonio Salera Veloso (born June 13, 1960), is a Filipino politician and vice mayor of Tagbilaran City, Bohol, Philippines. His nickname is "Toto". He was named after San Antonio de Padua whose feast day also falls on his birthday.

== Political career ==
He was elected councilor in 2001 and re-elected in 2004 as the No. 1 councilor. He ran and was elected vice mayor in 2007.

In 2010, he ran as a mayoralty candidate but lost to former mayor of Tagbilaran attorney Dan Lim.

In 2013, he was re-elected as vice mayor of Tagbilaran.

== Sources ==
- City Government of Tagbilaran website
- The Sangguniang Panlungsod of Tagbilaran website
- Governmental website for Tagbilaran
