= Bohol Provincial Board =

Legislative body of the province of Bohol, Philippines

Bohol Provincial Board Sangguniang Panlalawigan ng Bohol

Type
- Type: Unicameral
- Term limits: 3 terms (9 years)

Leadership
- Presiding Officer: Nicanor S. Besas, Nacionalista since June 30, 2025

Structure
- Seats: 13 board members 1 ex officio presiding officer
- Political groups: PFP (4) Nacionalista (4) NUP (1) RP (1) TBD (1) Nonpartisan (2) Appointed (1)
- Length of term: 3 years
- Authority: Local Government Code of the Philippines

Elections
- Voting system: Plurality-at-large (regular members); Indirect election (ex officio members); Acclamation (sectoral member)
- Last election: May 12, 2025
- Next election: May 15, 2028

Meeting place
- Bohol Provincial Capitol, Tagbilaran

The Bohol Provincial Board is the Sangguniang Panlalawigan (provincial legislature) of the Philippine province of Bohol.

The members are elected via plurality-at-large voting: the province is divided into three districts, the first two sending three members to the provincial board, while the third sends four members; the electorate votes, and the number of winning candidates depends on the number of members their district sends. The vice governor is the ex officio presiding officer, and only votes to break ties. The vice governor is elected via the plurality voting system province-wide.

The districts used in appropriation of members is coextensive with the legislative districts of Bohol.

== District apportionment ==
Elections	No. of seats per district			Ex officio seats	Total seats
Elections	1st	2nd	3rd	Ex officio seats	Total seats
2004–13	3	3	4	3	13

== List of members ==
An additional three ex officio members are the presidents of the provincial chapters of the Association of Barangay Captains, the Councilors' League, the Sangguniang Kabataan provincial president; the municipal and city (if applicable) presidents of the Association of Barangay Captains, Councilor's League and Sangguniang Kabataan, shall elect amongst themselves their provincial presidents which shall be their representatives at the board.

=== Current members ===
These are the members after the 2025 local elections and 2023 barangay and SK elections:

- Vice Governor: Nicanor S. Besas (Nacionalista)

Seat	Board member	Party	Start of term	End of term
1st district	Lucille Y. Lagunay	PFP	June 30, 2022	June 30, 2028
1st district	Mutya Kismet T. Macuno	RP	June 30, 2025	June 30, 2028
1st district	Venzencio B. Arcamo	NUP	June 30, 2022	June 30, 2028
2nd district	Jiselle Rae A. Villamor	PFP	June 30, 2022	June 30, 2028
2nd district	Tomas D. Abapo Jr.	PFP	June 30, 2022	June 30, 2028
2nd district	Fernando B. Estavilla	PFP	June 30, 2025	June 30, 2028
3rd district	Tita V. Baja	Nacionalista	June 30, 2025	June 30, 2028
3rd district	Dionisio Joseph V. Balite	Nacionalista	June 30, 2022	June 30, 2028
3rd district	Greg Crispinito L. Jala	Nacionalista	June 30, 2022	June 30, 2025
3rd district	Nathaniel O. Binlod	Nacionalista	June 30, 2022	June 30, 2028
ABC	Romulo Cepedoza	Nonpartisan	August 18, 2016	January 1, 2026
PCL	TBD			June 30, 2028
SK	Lawrence Xavier Ancla	Nonpartisan	November 29, 2023	January 1, 2026

=== Vice Governor ===
Election year	Name	Party
2001	Julius Caesar Herrera	Lakas
2004	Julius Caesar Herrera	Lakas
2007	Julius Caesar Herrera	Lakas
2010	Concepcion Lim	Lakas–Kampi
2013	Concepcion Lim	Liberal
2016	Dionisio Balite	PDP–Laban
2019	Rene Relampagos	NUP
2022	Dionisio Victor Balite	NPC
2022	Tita Baja (Note: Elevated to Vice Governor on July 17, 2024 upon the death of Dionisio Victor Balite.)	Nacionalista
2025	Nicanor S. Besas	Nacionalista

=== 1st District ===
Election year	Member (party)	Member (party)	Member (party)
2004	Jose Veloso (Lakas)	Eufrasio Mascariñas (Lakas)	Felix Uy (Lakas)
2007	Jose Veloso (Lakas)	Cesar Lopez (Lakas)	Alfonso Damalerio (Lakas)
2010	Venzencio Arcamo (Lakas)	Cesar Lopez (PDP-LABAN)	Abeleon Damalerio (Lakas)
2013	Venzencio Arcamo (Liberal)	Cesar Lopez (Liberal)	Abeleon Damalerio (Liberal)
2016	Venzencio Arcamo (Liberal)	Ricky Masamayor (Liberal)	Abeleon Damalerio (Liberal)
2019	Lucille Lagunay (NPC)	Ricky Masamayor (Liberal)	Aldner Damalerio (Liberal)
2022	Lucille Lagunay (NPC)	Venzencio Arcamo (NUP)	Aldner Damalerio (NUP)
2025	Lucille Y. Lagunay (PFP)	Mutya Kismet T. Macuno (RP)	Venzencio B. Arcamo (NUP)

=== 2nd District ===
Election year	Member (party)	Member (party)	Member (party)
2004	Amalia Tirol (Lakas)	Felix Garcia (Lakas)	Ma. Fe Camacho-Lejos (Lakas)
2007	Amalia Tirol (Lakas)	Josephine Jumamoy (TEAM Unity)	Ma. Fe Camacho-Lejos (Lakas)
2010	Romulo Cepedoza (Lakas-Kampi)	Gerardo Garcia (Nacionalista)	Josephine Jumamoy (Lakas-Kampi)
2013	Jovanna Jumamoy (Liberal)	Gerardo Garcia (NPC)	Tomas Abapo Jr. (NPC)
2016	Agapito Avenido (Liberal)	Niño Rey Boniel (Nacionalista) (Note: Resigned due to his involvement in the death of Gisela Boniel, June 14, 2018.)	Tomas Abapo Jr. (NPC)
2016	Agapito Avenido (Liberal)	Vierna Boniel-Maglasang (Nacionalista) (Note: Appointed by President Rodrigo Duterte on March 22, 2019; took her oath on May 3, 2019.)	Tomas Abapo Jr. (NPC)
2019	Frans Garcia (NUP)	Vierna Boniel-Maglasang (NPC)	Restituto Auxtero (NUP)
2022	Jiselle Rae Villamor (Aksyon)	Vierna Boniel-Maglasang (PDP–Laban)	Tomas Abapo Jr. (NPC)
2025	Jiselle Rae A. Villamor (PFP)	Tomas D. Abapo Jr. (PFP)	Fernando B. Estavilla (PFP)

=== 3rd District ===
Election year	Member (party)	Member (party)	Member (party)	Member (party)
2004	Dionesio Balite (Lakas)	Concepcion Lim (Lakas)	Ester Galbreath (Lakas)	Godofreda Tirol (Lakas)
2007	Bienvenido Molina (Lakas)	Josil Trabajo (Lakas)	Ester Galbreath (Lakas)	Aster Piollo (Lakas)
2010	Bienvenido Molina (Nacionalista)	Brigida Imboy (Lakas)	Godofreda Tirol (Independent)	Dionesio Balite (Nacionalista)
2013	Elpidio Jala (Liberal) (Note: Died on May 2, 2022.)	Brigido Imboy (Liberal)	Godofreda Tirol (Liberal)	Dionisio Balite (UNA)
2016	Elpidio Jala (Liberal)	Alexie Besas-Tutor (Liberal)	Jade Bautista (Liberal)	Dionisio Victor Balite (PDP–Laban)
2019	Elpidio Jala (Liberal)	Elpidio Bonita (PDP–Laban)	Jade Bautista (Liberal)	Dionisio Victor Balite (PDP–Laban)
2022	Greg Jala (Nacionalista)	Elpidio Bonita (PDP–Laban)	Tita Baja (Nacionalista)	Nathaniel Binlod (PDP–Laban)
2025	Tita V. Baja (Nacionalista)	Dionisio Joseph V. Balite (Nacionalista)	Greg Crispinito L. Jala (Nacionalista)	Nathaniel O. Binlod (Nacionalista)
