= Nuevas Montes =

Filipina politician

Nuevas Tirol-Montes

President, University of Bohol
- Incumbent
- Assumed office 12 December 2014
- Preceded by: Victoriano B. Tirol, Jr.

Vice Mayor, Tagbilaran
- In office 30 June 2004 – 30 June 2007
- Preceded by: Jorge Cabalit
- Succeeded by: Jose Veloso

City Councilor
- In office 30 June 1998 – 30 June 2004

Personal details
- Born: November 7, 1947 (age 78) Tagbilaran City, Bohol
- Party: Nationalist People's Coalition (NPC)
- Spouse: Adriano Montes
- Education: University of Bohol
- Occupation: Attorney, Politician

Nuevas "Jas" Tirol-Montes is a lawyer and a former vice mayor of Tagbilaran, Bohol, Philippines. She is a former president and currently a member of the board of trustees of the University of Bohol. She was installed as university president on December 12, 2014, having been vice president for administration for 20 years.

== Educational Background ==
She finished BSE (1967), Magna Cum Laude; MA in education (1969), Magna Cum Laude, Ph.D. in education (1971); Benemeritus, at the University of Santo Tomas; and Bachelor of Law (1984) at the University of Bohol. She passed the Philippine Teachers Examination in (1971), was one of top 20 of more than 1,000 examinees in the Schools Division Superintendent Exam (1974), and passed the bar (1986).

== Academic career ==
After finishing her doctorate degree at UST, she was offered the job of vice president of Agusan Colleges, while at the same time dean of the graduate school, until 1973. She came back to the University of Bohol and held various positions: dean of student affairs, dean of academic affairs, professor of the graduate school, while building up her career as an educator and administrator. She was designated assistant schools division superintendent of Bohol in 1983, and later acting schools division superintendent of Siquijor, then was transferred to Toledo City.

The call of home and family was irresistible. Montes opted to come back to UB in 1994 and was designated vice president. Today, Montes is member of the board of trustees, executive director of the Family Care Center, and vice president for administration of the University of Bohol.

== Political career ==
Beyond her academic work, Montes is also in politics. “I’d like to call it governance instead of politics,” she suggests. When asked why she won twice as number one councilor of the city, she answers: “I just do my work quietly – no fanfare, and if possible, no radio interviews. I am very shy but I’m passionate when I support a good cause. I was glad there were so much to do in my Committee in the Council, such as education, health, family, women and children”.

"I also have a very supportive family,” she continues. “My parents treated us their eleven children like they were their prized trophies, but they never spoiled us. My husband, City Prosecutor Adriano P. Montes is my avid fan. A classmate since Grade II, he and my children, Hara, a Nurse married to Jacob Sevilla, also a Nurse, Dasa, a Physical Therapist now in the United States, and Anne, who graduated from the Ateneo Law School and is now connected with PAO (Public Attorneys Office), are very supportive of my plans. That explains why I’m a free spirit. I even served the Public Schools before as Assistant Schools Division Superintendent of Bohol, OIC Superintendent of Siquijor and Toledo City. I have an extensive exposure in different fields, which serve me well now. I get to try anything, anytime for the right reasons and that’s why I ran for Vice Mayor in 2004. I think that makes me lucky".

"This brings to mind Montes’ topping the race for councilors, and three years later, winning as vice mayor. Not just because she was just lucky, but more significantly because the Tagbilaranons find her well qualified for the job, with a giftedness that is amazing and commendable. As a learned and a talented woman, she has brought to the city council a new dimension of respect".

== Sources ==
- City Government of Tagbilaran
- Loy Palapos, Bohol's Choice Cuts, "The Bohol Chronicle"
