= Dimiao =

Municipality in Bohol, Philippines

- Municipality
- Municipality of Dimiao
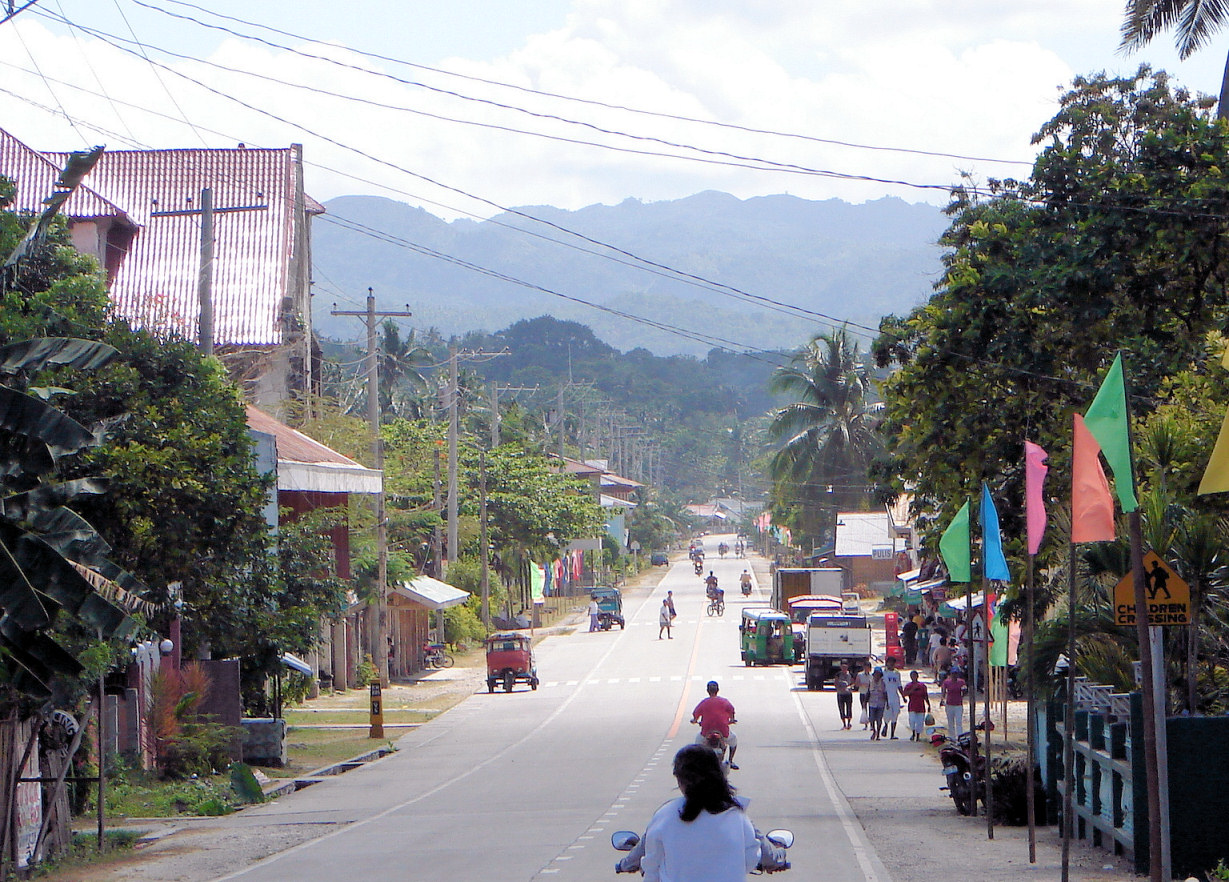
- National Road in Dimiao

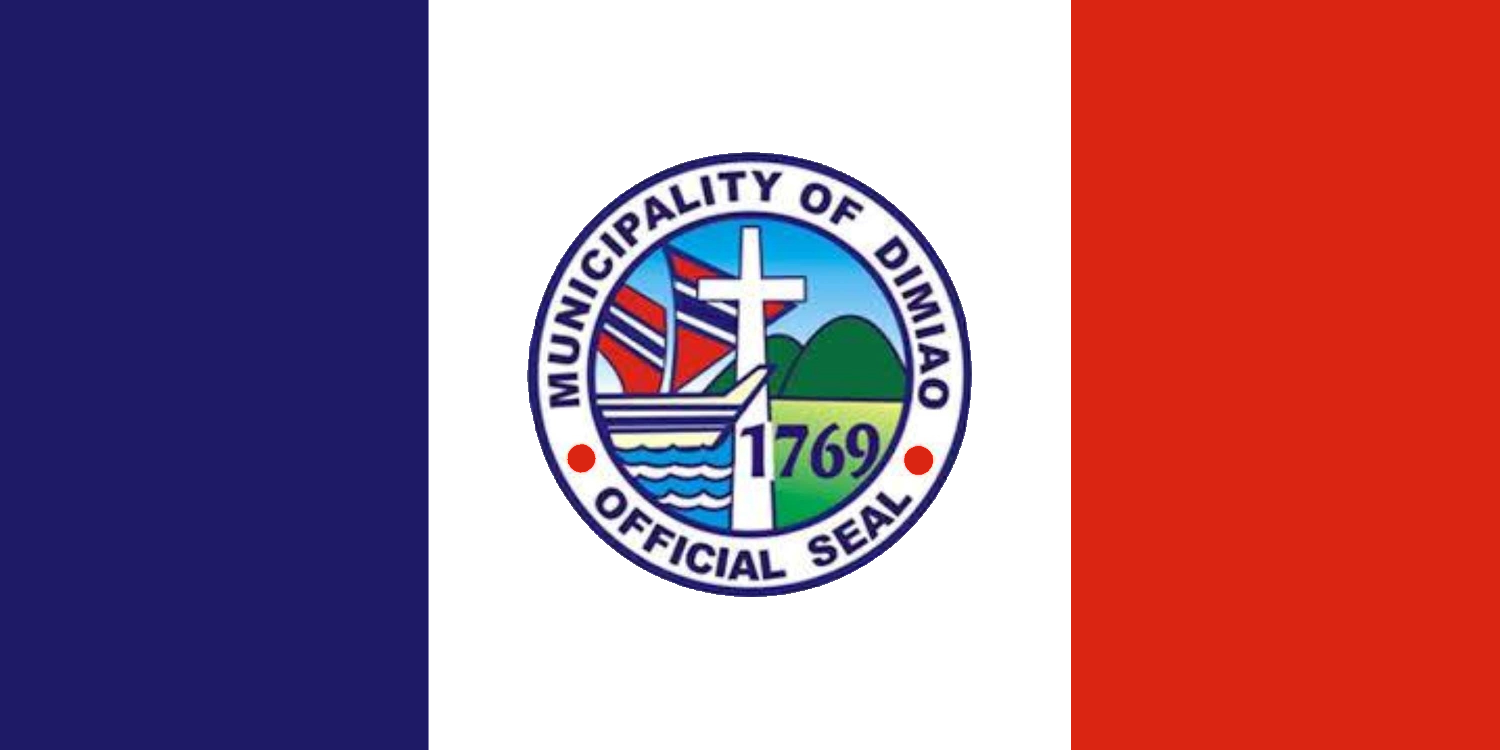
- Flag

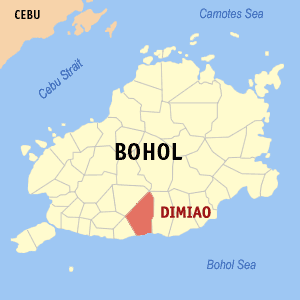
- Map of Bohol with Dimiao highlighted
- Interactive map of Dimiao
- Location within the Philippines
- Coordinates: 9°37′N 124°10′E
- Country: Philippines
- Region: Central Visayas
- Province: Bohol
- District: 3rd district
- Founded: 22 January 1769
- Barangays: 35 (see Barangays)

Government
  - Type: Sangguniang Bayan
  - Mayor: Randolph L. Ang
  - Vice Mayor: Noel M. Hamlag
  - Representative: Kristine Alexie B. Tutor
  - Municipal Council: Members: Jayson N. Gamayon; Ervie S. Visarra; Beverly Faelden-Abio; Jonamie L. Lluvido; Paciencio G. Magtajas, Jr; Jessie T. Paluga; Reu M. Hamlag; Aniceta C. Ucang; NB COMELEC
  - Electorate: 11,129 voters (2025)

Area
  - Total: 135.75 km^{2} (52.41 sq mi)
- Elevation: 68 m (223 ft)
- Highest elevation: 494 m (1,621 ft)
- Lowest elevation: 0 m (0 ft)

Population (2024 census)
  - Total: 14,894
  - Density: 109.72/km^{2} (284.16/sq mi)
  - Households: 3,457

Economy
  - Income class: 4th municipal income class
  - Poverty incidence: 19.25% (2023)
  - Revenue: ₱ 130.9 million (2024)
  - Assets: ₱ 392.3 million (2024)
  - Expenditure: ₱ 51.47 million (2024)
  - Liabilities: ₱ 89.48 million (2024)

Service provider
  - Electricity: Bohol 1 Electric Cooperative (BOHECO 1)
- Time zone: UTC+8 (PST)
- ZIP code: 6305
- PSGC: 071220000
- IDD : area code: +63 (0)38
- Native languages: Boholano dialect Cebuano; Tagalog

Dimiao, officially the Municipality of Dimiao (Cebuano: Munisipalidad sa Dimiao; Tagalog: Bayan ng Dimiao), is a municipality in the province of Bohol, Philippines. According to the 2024 census, it has a population of 14,894 people.

Dimiao lies alongside the C.P.G. circumferential road on the southern coast of the island, 38 kilometres (24 mi) east of Tagbilaran.

== History ==
When the parish was founded is uncertain, although baptism records dates back to the year 1750. It is one of the older municipalities of Bohol, the 1818 census recorded 2,916 native families and only 1 Spanish-Filipino family, The population was then 8,820 in 1897. This town used to cover a large area that included the municipalities of Valencia and Lila. In 1867, Valencia was separated from Dimiao because of increased population, and Lila was made an independent municipality on 1 January 1915.

== Geography ==
=== Barangays ===
Dimiao is politically subdivided into 35 barangays. Each barangay consists of puroks and some have sitios.

PSGC	Barangay	Population			±% p.a.	
		2024		2010		
071220001	Abihid	2.3%	343	333	▴	0.21%
071220002	Alemania	1.1%	167	208	▾	−1.51%
071220003	Baguhan	2.2%	334	324	▴	0.21%
071220004	Bakilid	1.1%	164	165	▾	−0.04%
071220005	Balbalan	1.9%	278	273	▴	0.13%
071220006	Banban	3.5%	520	521	▾	−0.01%
071220007	Bauhugan	2.1%	316	308	▴	0.18%
071220008	Bilisan	1.1%	164	161	▴	0.13%
071220009	Cabagakian	3.7%	545	649	▾	−1.20%
071220010	Cabanbanan	2.4%	352	416	▾	−1.15%
071220011	Cadap‑agan	3.1%	469	445	▴	0.37%
071220012	Cambacol	1.7%	256	248	▴	0.22%
071220013	Cambayaon	2.8%	415	372	▴	0.76%
071220014	Canhayupon	4.4%	661	669	▾	−0.08%
071220015	Canlambong	3.2%	477	526	▾	−0.68%
071220016	Casingan	1.3%	199	207	▾	−0.27%
071220017	Catugasan	1.8%	267	313	▾	−1.10%
071220018	Datag	1.6%	241	221	▴	0.60%
071220019	Guindaguitan	2.9%	437	455	▾	−0.28%
071220020	Guingoyuran	3.5%	514	538	▾	−0.32%
071220021	Ile	1.7%	254	269	▾	−0.40%
071220022	Lapsaon	2.8%	424	455	▾	−0.49%
071220023	Limokon Ilaod	3.5%	526	641	▾	−1.36%
071220024	Limokon Ilaya	4.4%	654	724	▾	−0.70%
071220025	Luyo	5.6%	836	960	▾	−0.96%
071220026	Malijao	2.0%	295	319	▾	−0.54%
071220027	Oac	4.9%	732	805	▾	−0.66%
071220028	Pagsa	2.2%	332	309	▴	0.50%
071220029	Pangihawan	1.3%	187	242	▾	−1.77%
071220031	Puangyuta	2.1%	312	297	▴	0.34%
071220030	Sawang	3.5%	514	491	▴	0.32%
071220033	Tangohay	4.5%	671	635	▴	0.38%
071220036	Taongon Cabatuan	3.6%	533	594	▾	−0.75%
071220038	Taongon Can‑andam	4.6%	683	802	▾	−1.11%
071220037	Tawid Bitaog	2.0%	292	271	▴	0.52%
	Total		14,894	15,166	▾	−0.13%

=== Climate ===
Climate data for Dimiao, Bohol
Month	Jan	Feb	Mar	Apr	May	Jun	Jul	Aug	Sep	Oct	Nov	Dec	Year
Mean daily maximum °C (°F)	28 (82)	29 (84)	30 (86)	31 (88)	31 (88)	30 (86)	30 (86)	30 (86)	30 (86)	29 (84)	29 (84)	29 (84)	30 (85)
Mean daily minimum °C (°F)	23 (73)	22 (72)	23 (73)	23 (73)	24 (75)	25 (77)	24 (75)	24 (75)	24 (75)	24 (75)	23 (73)	23 (73)	24 (74)
Average precipitation mm (inches)	102 (4.0)	85 (3.3)	91 (3.6)	75 (3.0)	110 (4.3)	141 (5.6)	121 (4.8)	107 (4.2)	111 (4.4)	144 (5.7)	169 (6.7)	139 (5.5)	1,395 (55.1)
Average rainy days	18.6	14.8	16.5	16.7	23.9	26.4	25.6	24.1	24.4	26.3	23.7	20.5	261.5
Source: Meteoblue

== Demographics ==
Dimiao Municipal Hall

Population census of Dimiao
Year	Pop.	±% p.a.
1903	8,650	—
1918	10,497	+1.30%
1939	10,213	−0.13%
1948	10,673	+0.49%
1960	9,315	−1.13%
1970	10,009	+0.72%
1975	11,225	+2.33%
1980	10,845	−0.69%
1990	11,697	+0.76%
1995	12,372	+1.06%
2000	14,151	+2.92%
2007	14,187	+0.04%
2010	15,166	+2.46%
2015	14,364	−1.03%
2020	14,889	+0.76%
2024	14,894	+0.01%
Source: Philippine Statistics Authority

== Economy ==
Poverty incidence of Dimiao (%)

Source: Philippine Statistics Authority

The people of Dimiao lives on farming, tubâ-gathering, rope-making and fishing since it is located along the coast. Rice, corn, maguey, copra, rope, mango and tubâ are their most important products.

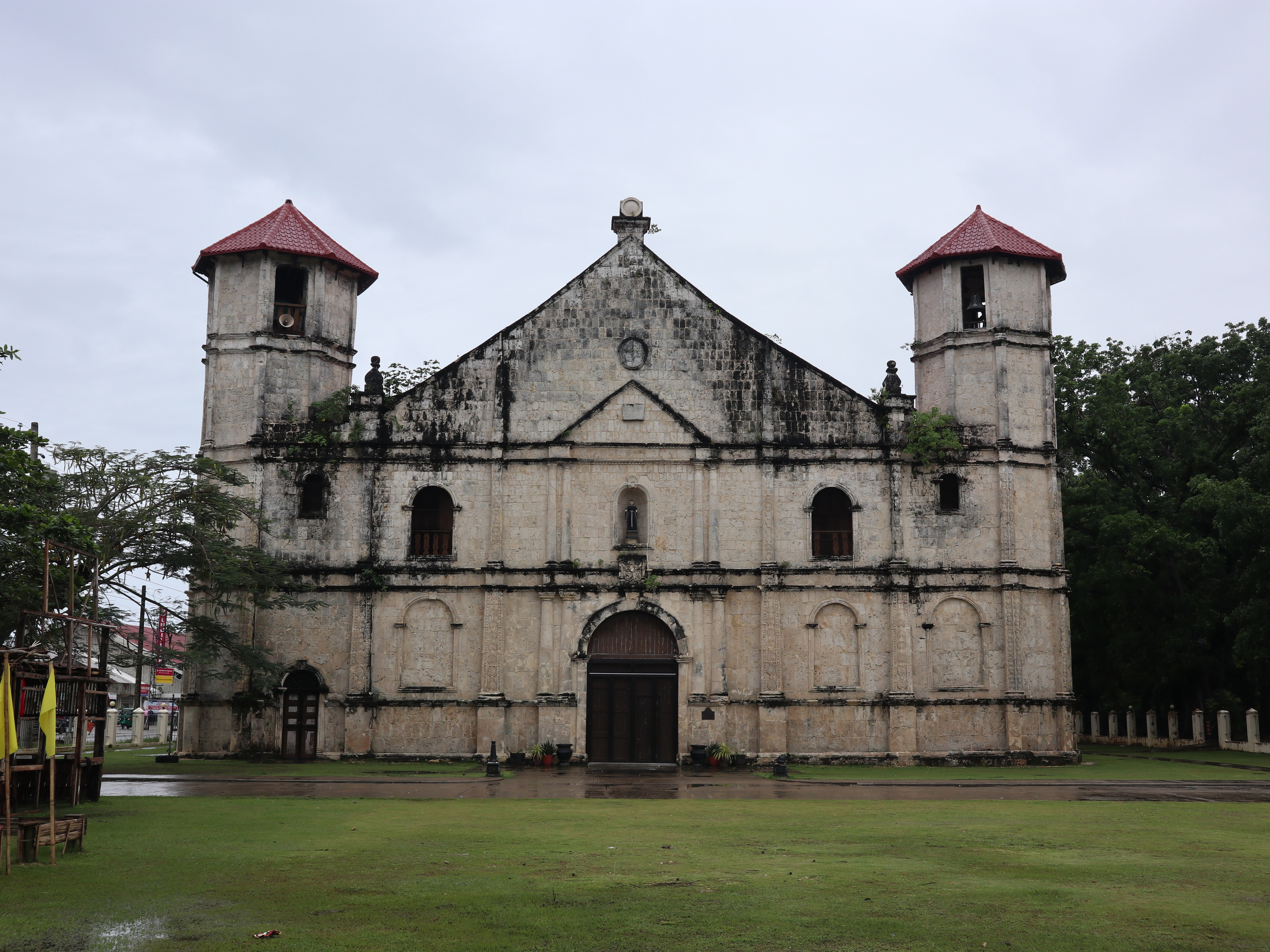
San Nicolas De Tolentino Church

== Attractions ==
The Dimiao Church is one of the oldest stone churches of Bohol, built in the later half of the 19th century. It is identified by its twin bell towers either side of the church's front façade, and it is dedicated to San Nicolas Tolentino, who is also the town's patron saint and whose feast day is celebrated 10 September.

== Education ==
The town has schools scattered throughout the barangays. Those located at the town proper are the Banban Elementary School, the Dimiao National High School and a private one, the St. Nicholas Academy. 90% of the inhabitants are literate and most speak some English and Filipino.

== Sources ==
"Ermita Ruins". Municipality of Dimiao. 2010. Archived from the original on 28 October 2012.
