= Bohol =

Province of the Philippines

- Province
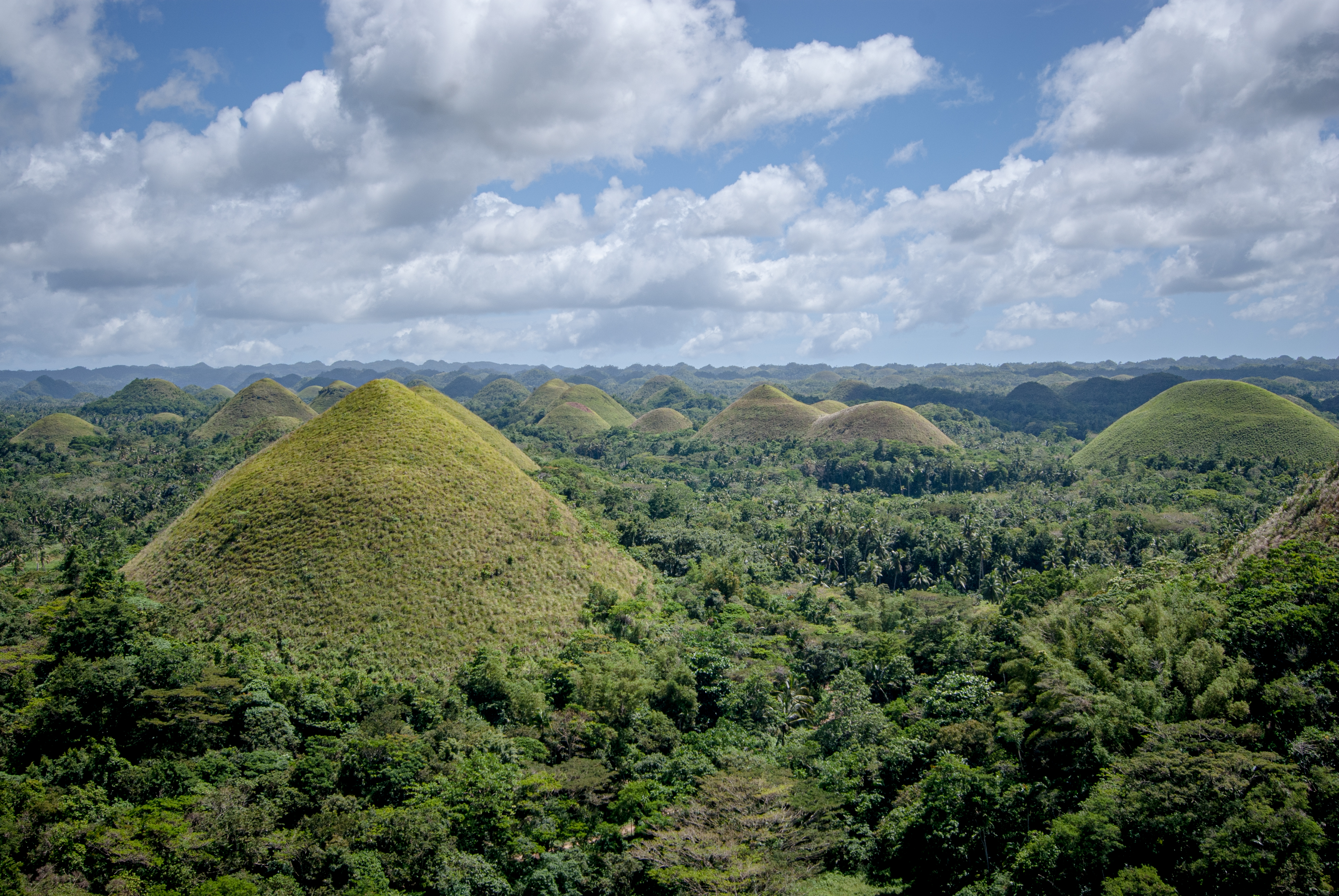
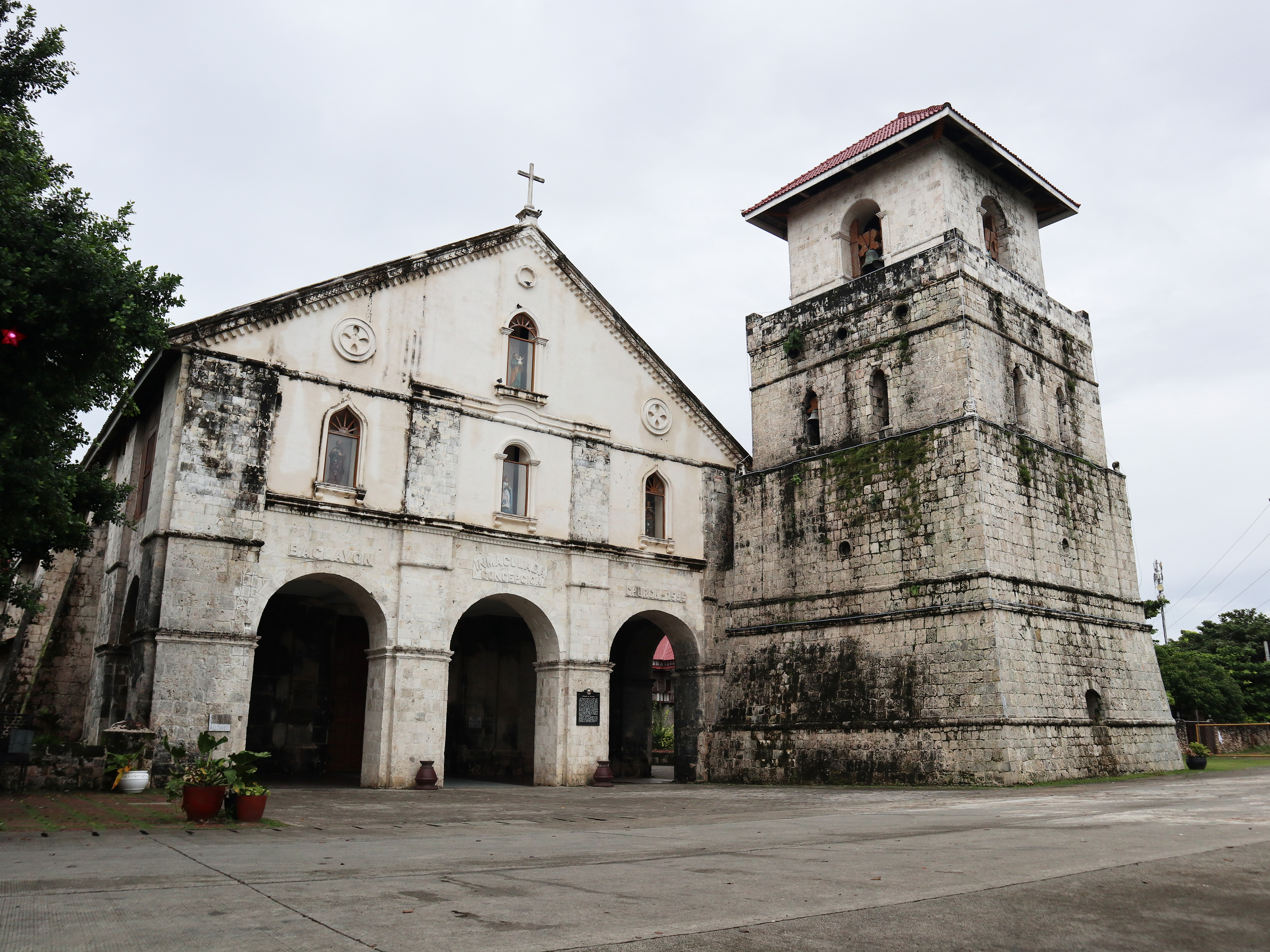
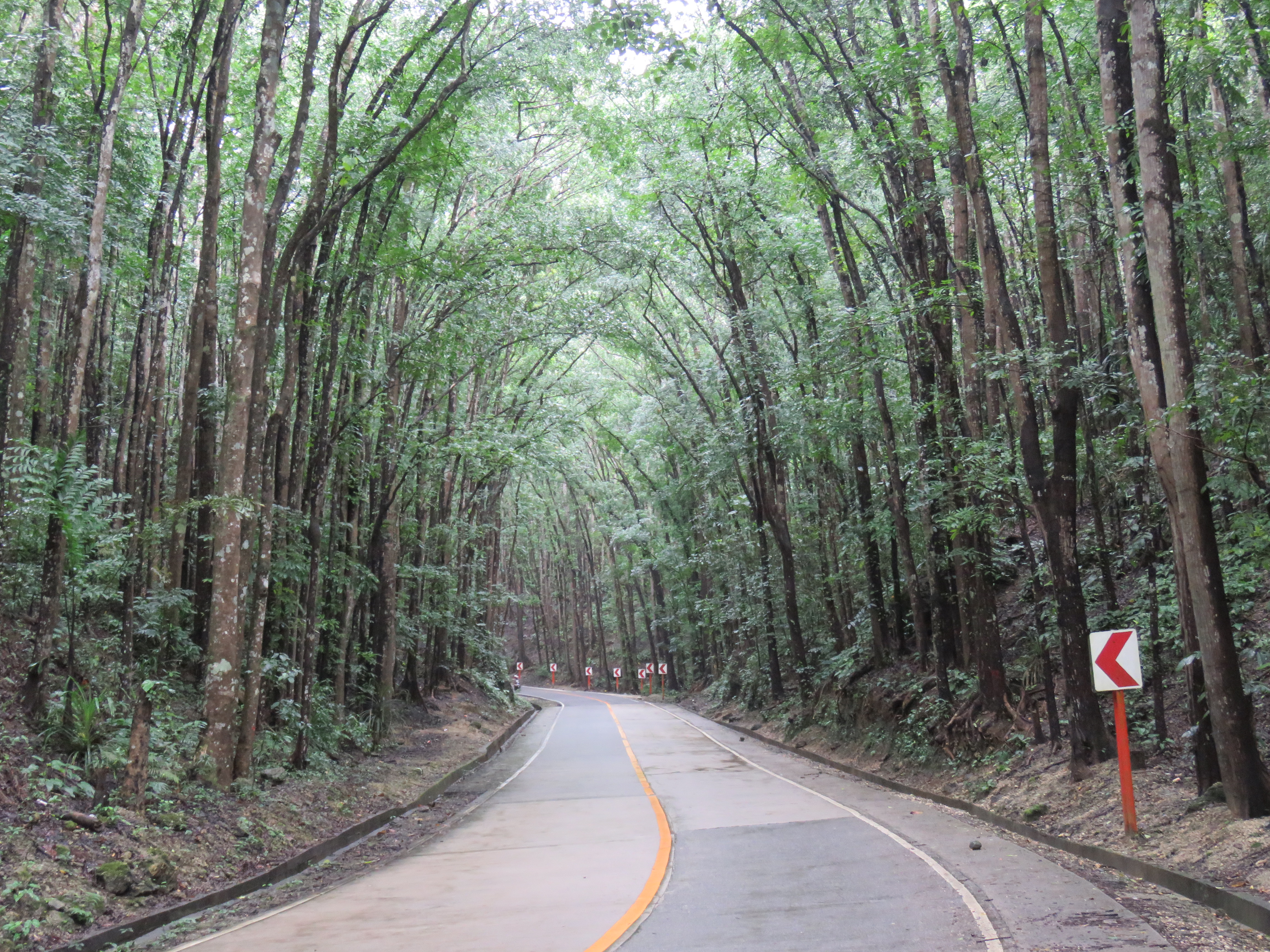
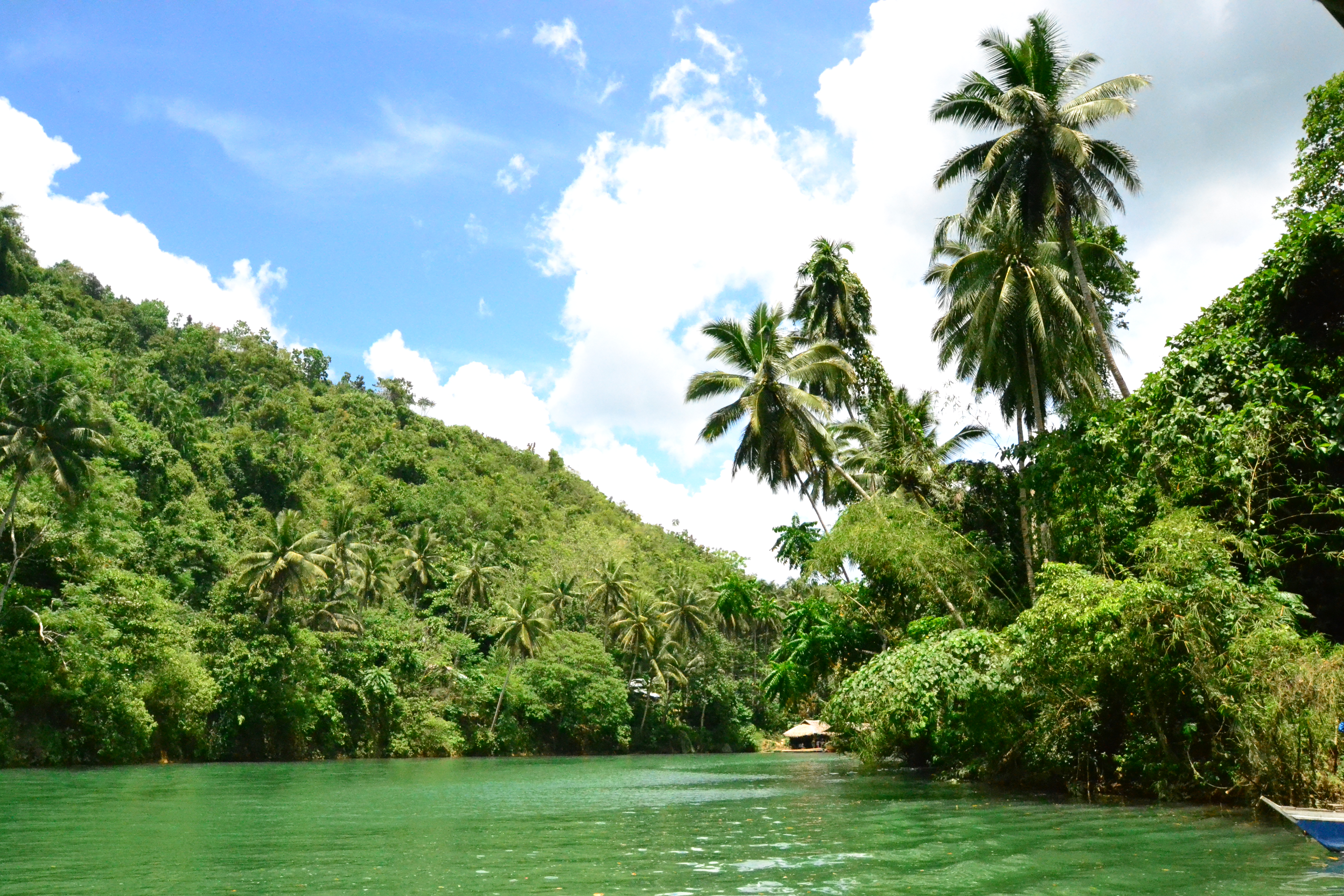
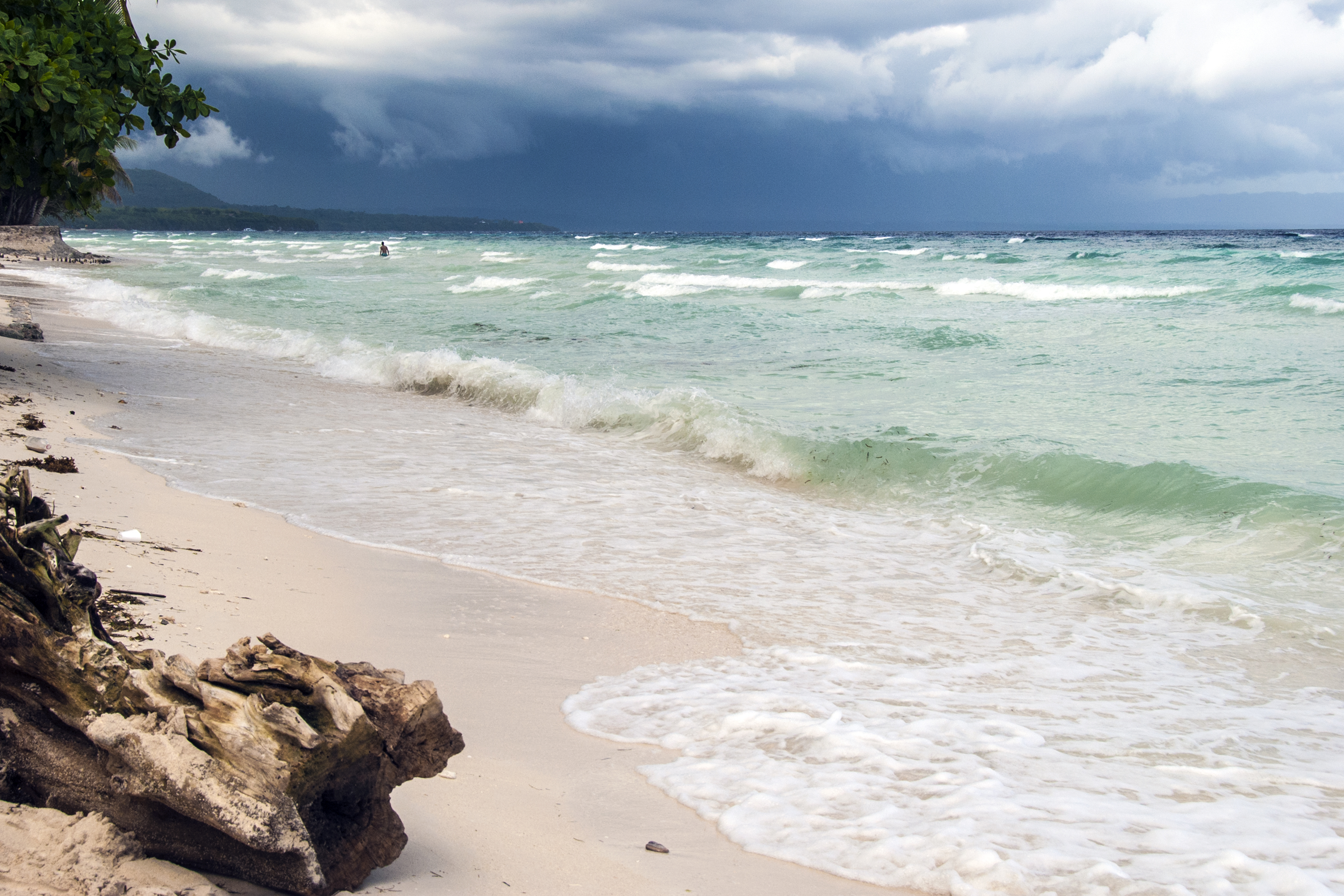
- Clockwise from the top: Chocolate Hills, Rajah Sikatuna Protected Landscape, Panglao Island, Loboc River, Baclayon Church

- Flag Seal
- Anthem: Awit sa Bohol (Cebuano) ("Bohol Hymn")
- Location in the Philippines
- Interactive map of Bohol
- Coordinates: 9°54′N 124°12′E
- Country: Philippines
- Region: Central Visayas
- Discovered by the Spanish: 16 March 1565
- Founded: 22 July 1854
- Capital and largest city: Tagbilaran

Government
  - Type: Sangguniang Panlalawigan
  - Governor: Erico Aristotle C. Aumentado
  - Vice Governor: Nick Besas
  - Legislature: Bohol Provincial Board Members: 1st District; John Geesnell Yap; 2nd District; Vanvan Aumentado; 3rd District; Alexie Tutor
  - Electorate: 981,564 voters (2025)

Area
  - Total: 4,820.95 km^{2} (1,861.38 sq mi)
- Highest elevation (Mount Matunog): 864 m (2,835 ft)

Population (2024 census)
  - Total: 3,400,522
  - Rank: 20th out of 82
  - Density: 705.363/km^{2} (1,826.88/sq mi)
  - Households: 322,022
- Demonym(s): boholano Bul·anon boholana Boholan

Divisions
  - Independent cities: 0
  - Component cities: 1: Tagbilaran
  - Municipalities: 47: Alburquerque; Alicia; Anda; Antequera; Baclayon; Balilihan; Batuan; Bien Unido; Bilar; Buenavista; Calape; Candijay; Carmen; Catigbian; Clarin; Corella; Cortes; Dagohoy; Danao; Dauis; Dimiao; Duero; Garcia Hernandez; Getafe; Guindulman; Inabanga; Jagna; Lila; Loay; Loboc; Loon; Mabini; Maribojoc; Panglao; Pilar; President Carlos P. Garcia; Sagbayan; San Isidro; San Miguel; Sevilla; Sierra Bullones; Sikatuna; Talibon; Trinidad; Tubigon; Ubay; Valencia
  - Districts: List: Legislative districts of Bohol

Economy
  - Income class: 1st provincial income class
  - Poverty incidence: 14.8% (2023)
  - Revenue: ₱ 38.13 million (2024)
  - Assets: ₱ 13,614 million (2024)
  - Expenditure: ₱ 1,676 million (2024)
  - Liabilities: ₱ 2,588 million (2024)
- Time zone: UTC+08:00 (PST)
- PSGC: 0701200000
- IDD : area code: +63 (0)38
- ISO 3166 code: PH-BOH
- Spoken languages: Cebuano; Eskayan
- Website: www.bohol.gov.ph

Bohol (Tagalog pronunciation: [buˈhol]), officially the Province of Bohol (Cebuano: Probinsya sa Bohol; Tagalog: Lalawigan ng Bohol), is an island province of the Philippines located in the Central Visayas region, consisting of the island itself and 75 minor surrounding islands. It is home to Boholano people. Its capital is Tagbilaran, the province's largest city. With a land area of 4,821 km^{2} (1,861 sq mi) and a coastline 261 km (162 mi) long, Bohol is the tenth largest island of the Philippines.

The province of Bohol is a first-class province divided into 3 congressional districts, comprising 1 component city and 47 municipalities. It has 1,109 barangays.

The province is a popular tourist destination with its beaches and resorts. The Chocolate Hills, numerous mounds of brown-colored limestone formations, are the most popular attraction. The formations can be seen by land (climbing the highest point) or by air via ultralight air tours. Panglao Island, located just southwest of Tagbilaran, is famous for its diving locations and is routinely listed as one of the top ten diving locations in the world. Numerous tourist resorts and dive centers dot the southern beaches. The Philippine tarsier, among the world's smallest primates, is indigenous to the island.

It was the home province of Carlos P. Garcia, the eighth president of the Republic of the Philippines (1957–1961) who was born in Talibon, Bohol.

On October 15, 2013, Bohol was devastated by a 7.2 magnitude earthquake whose epicenter was 6 km (3.7 mi) south of Sagbayan. The earthquake, which also hit southern Cebu, claimed 222 lives altogether and injured 374 people. It also destroyed or damaged a number of Bohol's heritage churches.

In 2023, Bohol Island was designated as a UNESCO Global Geopark, the first in the Philippines.

Bohol is also the province with the most towns in the Philippines, totalling 47 towns, and 1 component city, Tagbilaran.

== Etymology ==
Bohol is accordingly derived from the local word bo-ol, a kind of tree that flourished on the island. Similar to Nahuatl, the h in the middle was used to transcribe a glottal stop which is a common phoneme in the languages of the Philippines. The original name survives as Bool, a barangay or village in Tagbilaran City where Miguel Lopez de Legazpi supposedly landed.

== History ==
=== Early history ===
==== Late Metal Age to Protohistoric Period (3,000 B.C.) ====
The region of Southeastern Bohol, particularly Cogtong Bay in Candijay and the Anda Peninsula are known as the "cradle of civilization of Bohol" from archaeological findings of pre-colonial petroglyphs, and ancient bodies from burial sites which were housed in boat-shaped wooden-coffins. Boat coffin burial has been found prevalent in Mindanao, Palawan, Negros, Panay, Maranduque, and Masbate as well as throughout Southeast Asia in Borneo and Vietnam. Today, local healers and shaman still practice pagdiwata rituals, or offerings to the spirits for good fortune, located in Lamanok Point in Anda. The wooden boat coffins are estimated to date back 6,000 years ago from the Metal Age to the Protohistoric Period. The National Museum of the Philippines has excavated and recorded 9 local caves for preservation. Human remains found in Southeastern Bohol also contained artificially modified crania or a form of head-binding, practiced by ancient communities throughout history.

Unfortunately, theft and extraction of sacred burial sites of human remains by U.S. universities occurred during the American colonial area, particularly conducted by the University of Michigan and Bucknell University in the 1920s. The University of Michigan has up to 22 human remains taken from Carmen and Mabini, Bohol.

==== 12th to 16th century ====
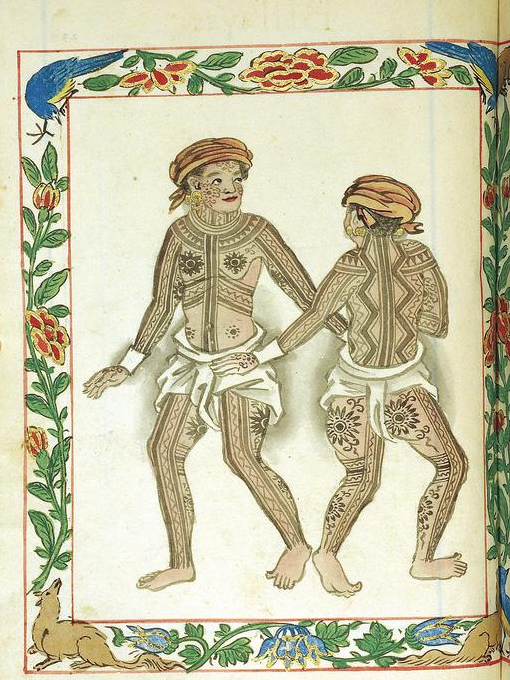
A drawing from the Boxer Codex depicting the Pintados.

In the early 17th century, Father Ignacio Alcina, recorded that a certain Datung Sumanga of Leyte wooed the princess, Bugbung Humasanum, of Bohol, and married her after raiding Imperial China and afterwards were the precursors of the people there. In 1667, Father Francisco Combes, in his Historia de Mindanao, mentioned that at one time in their history, the people of the Panglao invaded Bohol and subsequently imposed their economic and political dominance in the area. They considered the previous inhabitants of the islands as their slaves by reason of war, as witnessed for example by how Datu Pagbuaya, one of the rulers of Panglao, considered Datu Sikatuna as his vassal and relative. The invasion of Bohol by the people of Panglao ushered Bo-ol. Bo-ol prospered under the reign of the two brother rulers of Panglao: Datu Dailisan and Datu Pagbuaya, with trade links established with neighbouring Southeast Asian countries, particularly with the Sultanate of Ternate. The flourishing of trade is owed to its strategic location along the busy trading channels of Cebu and Butuan. For other countries such as Ternate to gain access to the busy trade ports of the Visayas, they need to first forge diplomatic ties with the Bohol "kingdom".

Relations between the Sultanate of Ternate and Bo-ol soured when the Ternatan sultan learned the sad fate of his emissary and his men who were executed by the two ruling chieftains of Bo-ol as punishment for abusing one of the concubines. Thus, in 1563, the Ternatans attacked Bohol. Twenty joangas deceitfully posing as traders were sent by the sultan of Ternate to attack Bohol. Caught unaware, the inhabitants of Bohol could not defend themselves against the Ternatan raiders who were also equipped with sophisticated firearms like muskets and arquebuses provided by the Portuguese, still unknown to Boholanos. Thousands of Boholanos lost their lives in this conflict, including Pagbuaya's brother Datu Dailisan. After the raid, Datu Pagbuaya, who was left as the sole reigning chief of the island, decided to abandon Bohol together with the rest of the freemen as they considered Bohol island unfortunate and accursed. They settled in the northern coast of the island of Mindanao, where they established the Dapitan settlement.

Bohol is derived from the word Bo-ho or Bo-ol. The island was the seat of the first international treaty of peace and unity between the native king Datu Sikatuna and Spanish conquistador Miguel López de Legazpi on 16 March 1565, through a blood compact alliance known today by many Filipinos as the Sandugo.

=== Spanish colonial era (1500s to 1890s) ===
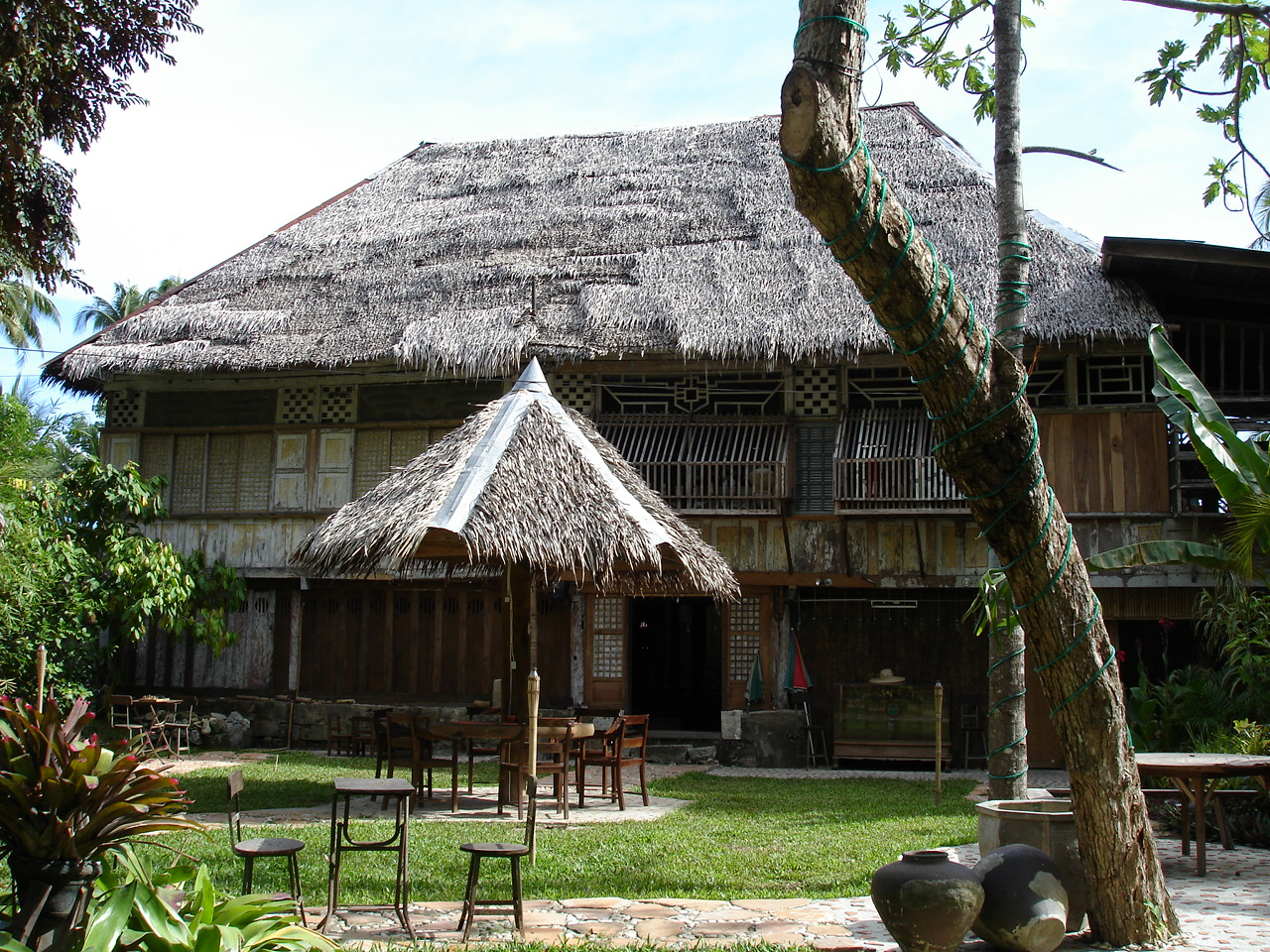
Clarin Ancestral House in Loay

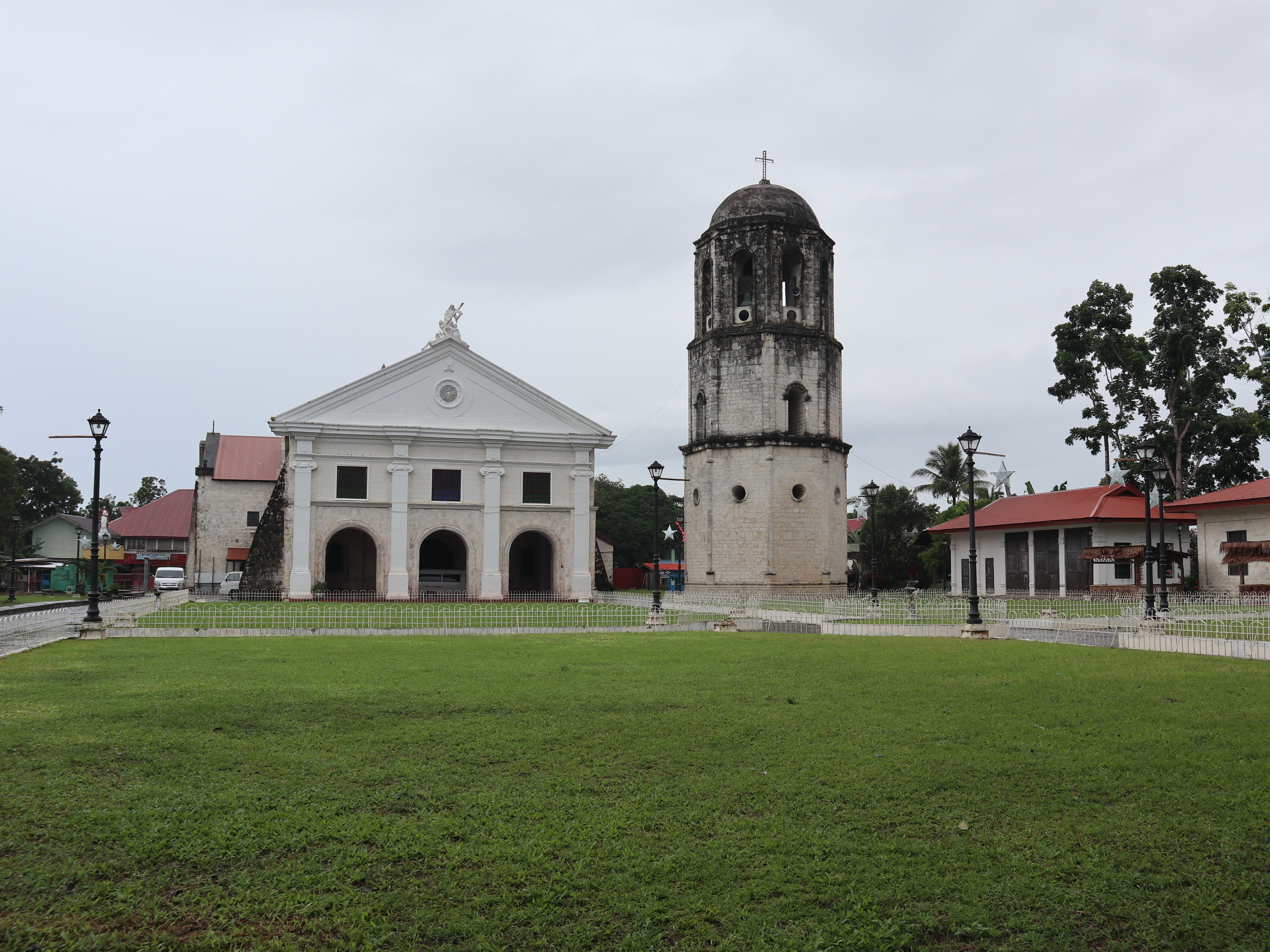
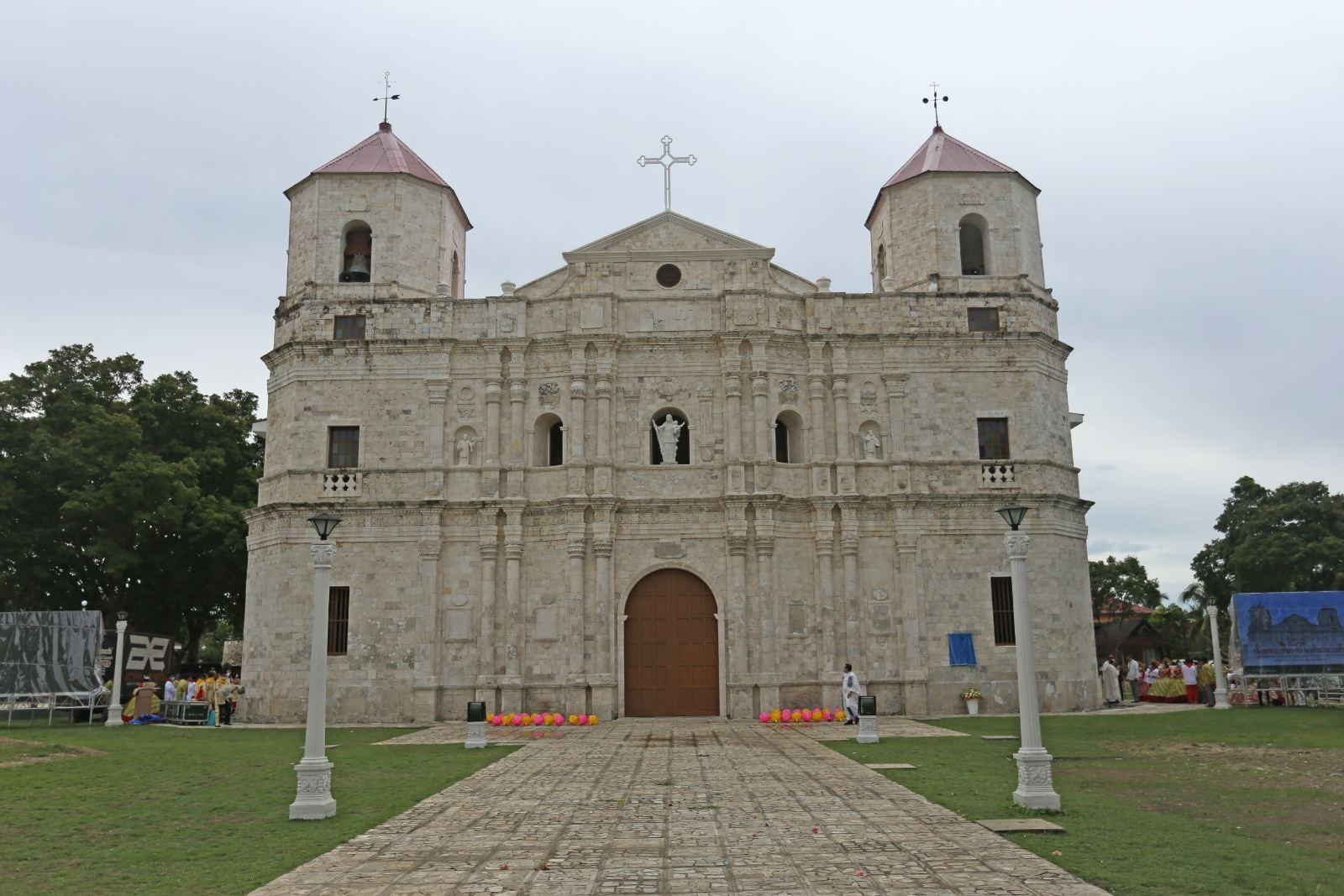
Three of the Spanish era churches in Bohol, From Top to Bottom: Loay Church, Loon Church, Loboc Church

The first contact of the island with Spanish explorers occurred in 1565. On 16 March 1565, a Spanish explorer named Miguel López de Legazpi arrived in Bohol seeking spices and gold. After convincing the datus that they were not Portuguese (who accompanied Maluku forces on the Dauis raid of 1563), Legazpi made a peace pact with Datu Sikatuna. This pact was signified with a sandugo (blood compact) between the two men. (Note: Gardner 1997, sourced from Zaide 1949) This event, simply called the Sandugo ("one blood") today, is celebrated in Bohol every year during the Sandugo Festival. The Sandugo is also depicted on the provincial flag and seal of Bohol.

Two significant revolts occurred in Bohol during the Spanish Era. One was the Tamblot Uprising in 1621, led by Tamblot, a babaylan. This revolt met with reprisals from Spanish-Sugbuhanon forces in Cebu. On 6 January 1635; under orders by Juan de Alcarazo the Alcalde-Mayor of Cebu, a force of 50 Spanish and 1,000 Visayan troops, battled the rebels and settled in Bohol.

The other was the famous Dagohoy Rebellion, considered the longest in Philippine history. This rebellion was led by Francisco Dagohoy, also known as Francisco Sendrijas, from 1744 to 1829. The 1818 Spanish census by Buzeta showed that there were 33,584 native families and 64 Spanish-Filipino families in Bohol island, specifically, the number of Spanish-Filipino families and their place of residences are as follows: 2 (Paminuitan hills), 9 (Dauis), 3 (Baclayon), 1 (Dimiao), 3 (Loay), 6 (Guindulman), and 41 Spanish-Filipino families in Inabanga.

On September 1, 1847, Governor-General Narciso Claveria and Governor-Intendent of the Visayas Francisco de la Canal formally proposed segregating Bohol, along with the islands of Siquijor, and Camiguin, from Cebu Province. They argued that with 330,000 residents, 56 towns, and 190 leagues of coastline across vast territory is hard to be managed by Cebu. They grouped Cebu, Camotes, and Bantayan into one province with 37,269 total taxpayers, while Bohol, Camiguin, and Siquijor into a new stand-alone Politico-Military Province containing 28,420 taxpayers (which represents 124,657 total residents).

Queen Isabella II of Spain passed a Royal Order No. 66 on March 3, 1854 formally creating the Province of Bohol. Captain of Engineer Guillermo Kirkpatrick was appointed to be its first Politico-Military Governor, abolishing the military command in the island. He arrived in Bohol on June 19, 1854, and he chose Tagbilaran as the capital of the new province.

In around 1860, the politico-military government of Bohol was effectively suspended, and its governance was reverted back under the Province of Cebu. It was once again separated from Cebu on 22 July 1864, together with Siquijor. A census in 1879 found Bohol with a population of 253,103 distributed among 34 municipalities.

The culture of the Boholanos was influenced by Spain and Mexico during colonization. Many traditional dances, music, dishes and other aspects of the culture have considerable Hispanic influence.

=== Philippine-American War (1899-1902) ===
After the United States defeated Spain in the Spanish–American War, the U.S. bought the entire Philippine islands. However, under the newly proclaimed independent government established by Gen. Emilio Aguinaldo, which was not recognized by the U.S., Bohol was governed as a Gobierno de Canton.

During the resulting Philippine–American War, American troops peacefully took over the island in March 1899. However, in September 1900, Colonel Pedro Samson led 2,000 in rebellion, due to the harsh treatment imparted by these troops and the destruction they caused. In response to the Samson uprising, American forces adopted a scorched-earth policy, burning 20 of Bohol’s 35 towns. In the southeastern portion of the island, towns such as Duero, Jagna, and Candijay entire barangays were burned down in search of freedom fighters resisting the U.S. invasion to the newly independent Philippines.

In Jagna, Philippine guerrillas led by Captain Gregorio "Guyo" Casenas planned to overtake an American garrison, unfortunately the local mayor had disclosed their plans to U.S. troops and this resulted in the Lonoy Massacre or Battle of Lonoy which U.S. troops ambushed and killed 406 Filipino soldiers while 3 Americans were killed. General Hughes led a campaign of repression in October 1901, destroying a number of towns, and threatening in December 1901 to burn Tagbilaran if the rebels did not surrender. Pantaleon E. del Rosario then negotiated the rebels’ surrender. At about the same period, on 20 October 1901, Bohol was organized as a province under the provisions of the Provincial Government Act of the Philippine Commission. Two years later, some of its towns were consolidated reducing its 35 municipalities to 32.

=== World War II: Japanese occupation (1942-1945) ===
Japanese troops landed in Tagbilaran on 17 May 1942. Boholanos struggled in a guerrilla resistance against the Japanese forces. Bohol was later liberated by local guerrillas and the Filipino and American troops who landed on 11 April 1945.

A plaque placed on the port of Tagbilaran commemorating the liberation reads:

One thousand one hundred seventy two officers and men of the 3rd Battalion of the 164th Infantry Regiment of the Americal Division under the command of Lt. Col. William H. Considine landed at the Tagbilaran Insular Wharf at 7:00 o'clock in the morning of April 11, 1945.

The convoy taking the Filipino and American liberation forces to Bohol consisted of a flotilla of six Landing Ships, (Medium)-(LSM), six Landing Craft (Infantry)-(LCI), two Landing Craft,(Medium)-(LCM), and one Landing Ship, Medium (Rocket)-[LSM(R)]. Upon arrival, the reinforced battalion combat team advanced rapidly to the east and northeast with the mission of destroying all hostile forces in Bohol. Motor patrols were immediately dispatched by Col. Considine, Task Force Commander, and combed the area to the north and east, approximately halfway across the island, but no enemies were found during the reconnaissance. Finally, an enemy group of undetermined strength was located to the north of Ginopolan in Valencia, near the Sierra-Bullones boundary.

By April 17 the Task Force was poised to strike in Ginopolan. The bulk of the Japanese force was destroyed and beaten in the ten days of action. Bohol was officially declared liberated on 25 May 1945, by Major General William H. Arnold, Commander of the Americal Division. About this time, most officers and men of the Bohol Area Command had been processed by units of the Eighth United States Army.

On 31 May 1945, the Bohol Area Command was officially deactivated upon orders of Lt. General Robert L. Eichelberger, Commanding General of the Eighth United States Army, together with the regular and constable troops of the Philippine Commonwealth Army, Philippine Constabulary, and the Boholano guerrillas.

During the Second Battle of Bohol from March to August 1945, Filipino troops of the 3rd, 8th, 83rd, 85th and 86th Infantry Division of the Philippine Commonwealth Army and 8th Constabulary Regiment of the Philippine Constabulary captured and liberated the island province of Bohol and helped the Boholano guerrilla fighters and U.S. liberation forces defeat the Japanese Imperial forces under General Sōsaku Suzuki.

=== Postwar Era ===
After the death of President Ramon Magsaysay, Vice President Carlos P. Garcia, who had been born in Talibon, succeeded to the presidency. He won a full term in the 1957 presidential election. He ran for a second full term as president in the 1961 presidential election and was defeated by Vice President Diosdado Macapagal.

In 1965 after a number of attempts to convert Tagbilaran into a City, the three Congressmen of Bohol sponsored the Bill to which would become Republic Act 4660, creating the City Charter of Tagbilaran on 18 June 1966.

=== Martial law era ===
The Philippines' gradual postwar recovery took a turn for the worse in the late 1960s and early 1970s, with the 1969 Philippine balance of payments crisis being one of the early landmark events. Economic analysts generally attribute this to the ramp-up on loan-funded government spending to promote Ferdinand Marcos' 1969 reelection campaign, although Marcos blamed the unrest on the 1968 formation of the Communist Party of the Philippines in an effort to earn political and military support from the zealously anticommunist Nixon and Ford administrations in the US.

In Bohol, which had been marked by agricultural self-sufficiency and "unusually egalitarian" set of social norms for landholding patterns until then, these economic shocks were worsened by rapid population growth and declining rice yields. The introduction of intensive rice agriculture in the uplands led to large-scale deforestation, which then led to the loss of water for rice fields in the lowlands. Cases of land usurpation began rising, which then degraded the relationships between landowners and tenants.

In 1972, one year before the expected end of his last constitutionally allowed term as president in 1973, Ferdinand Marcos placed the Philippines under Martial Law. This allowed Marcos to remain in power for fourteen more years, during which Bohol went through many social and economic ups and downs. The economic difficulties, paired with crony capitalism, and personal expensive lifestyles of the Marcos Family resulted in disillusionment, and when protests were met with warranteless detentions and human rights abuses, many oppositionists who had previously held "moderate" positions (i.e., calling for legislative reforms) became convinced that they had no choice but to call for more radical social change. The activities of the Marcos administration had "mythologized" the CPP's New People Army (NPA), so many of the radicalized protesters reacted by joining the NPA. By 1981, NPA activities had begun to be noted in the upland areas of Sevilla, Bilar, Batuan and Balilihan.

During this time Camp Dagohoy in Tagbilaran functioned as one of many detention centers during the Marcos dictatorship, under the ambit of Regional Command for Detainees III (RECAD III) at Camp Lapu-Lapu in Cebu City. Among those detainees of Camp Dagohoy was the 19-year old brother of Judge Meinrado Paredes, who was beaten with firearms so that he eventually suffered permanent damage to his hearing.

The immediate government response to the NPA presence was an integrated "social, economic, cultural and political" program which also saw the deployment of a "Special Action Force" to the island in 1985, but conflict continued and even intensified through the 1980s and 1990s. The government was only able to declare Bohol "NPA free" in the 2010s, after the success of an effort termed the "Bohol Model", which saw military action play a secondary role while highlighting the civil government's provision of services which addressed local poverty and other root causes of community discontent.

=== Contemporary ===
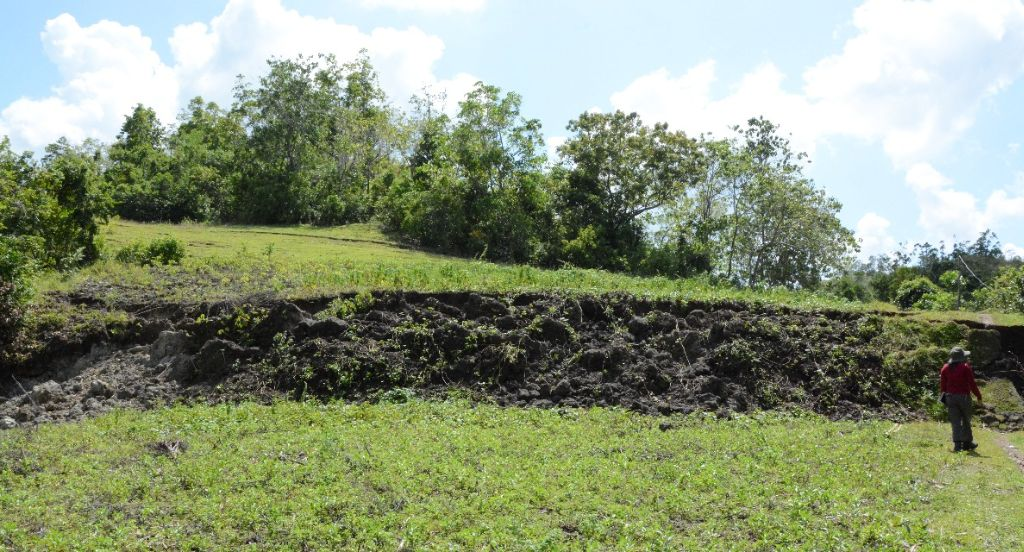
Part of the North Bohol Fault in Inabanga

==== 2013 earthquake ====
At 8:12 a.m. (PST) on 15 October 2013, the island province suffered a severe earthquake with a magnitude of 7.2 on the Richter scale. Its epicenter was at 9°52′N 124°04′E (6 km (3.7 mi) S 24° W of Sagbayan and 629 km (391 mi) from Manila), and its depth of focus was 12 km (7.5 mi). The quake was felt as far as Davao City, Mindanao. According to official reports by the National Disaster Risk Reduction and Management Council (NDRRMC), 57 people died in Bohol, and 104 were injured, The North Bohol Fault or "Great Wall of Bohol" is a reverse fault was discovered on 15, October 2013 during the 2013 Bohol earthquake. It became one of the tourist attractions in Bohol province

It was the deadliest earthquake in the Philippines since the 7.8 magnitude 1990 Luzon earthquake. Earlier that same year, Bohol was struck by an earthquake (on February 8, 1990) with an epicentre almost exactly the same as in 2013, causing six fatalities and 200 injured. Several buildings were damaged and it caused a tsunami.

==== 2017 militant incursion ====
On 12 April 2017, 11 Abu Sayyaf Group (ASG) militants staged an attack on Bohol. Three soldiers, a police officer and at least four of the armed men, including their leader Abu Rami, were killed in the clashes that started at 5 am. Also killed were two Inabanga villagers, though it was not clear whether they were killed in the crossfire or executed by the cornered militants. Security officials hunted down the remainder of the ASG who landed in Bohol from the hinterlands to a neighboring island in the province which ultimately led to the neutralization of Abu Asis, the last of the remaining bandits, in May. He was gunned down by police Special Weapons and Tactics operatives in Barangay Lawis, Calape while fighting it out to the end along with Ubayda. All 11 ASG members killed in the intrusion were given proper burials under Muslim tradition.

The tourism industry in Bohol was negatively affected by the ASG militants' incursion on the island, though tour operators believe the industry can recover.

==== 2023 UNESCO recognition ====
The United Nations Educational, Scientific and Cultural Organization on 24 May 2023, added Bohol as one of 18 new sites, to its Global Geoparks network – Philippine's first. UNESCO cites geoparks as "single, unified geographical areas" where sites and landscapes have international geological significance and to also be "managed with a holistic concept of protection, education, and sustainable development. Bohol covers 8,808 square kilometers of land surrounding lush marine protected areas. It features wondrous, not-yet-popular karstic geosites like caves and sinkholes, among others. UNESCO cited Bohol Island's "400 years of rich history and cultural traditions in harmony with its unique geological treasures."

Additional sites in the UNESCO Global Geopark include: Danajon Bank Double Barrier Reef, Alicia Panoramic Park, Princess Manan-aw Cave, Can-umantad Falls, Loon Coastal Geomorphic Conservation Park, Maribojoc Uplifted Marine Terrace, Baclayon Marine Terraces, Hinagdanan Cave, Canawa Cold Spring, Cave pools of Anda, Lamanok Island and Batungay Cave.

== Geography ==
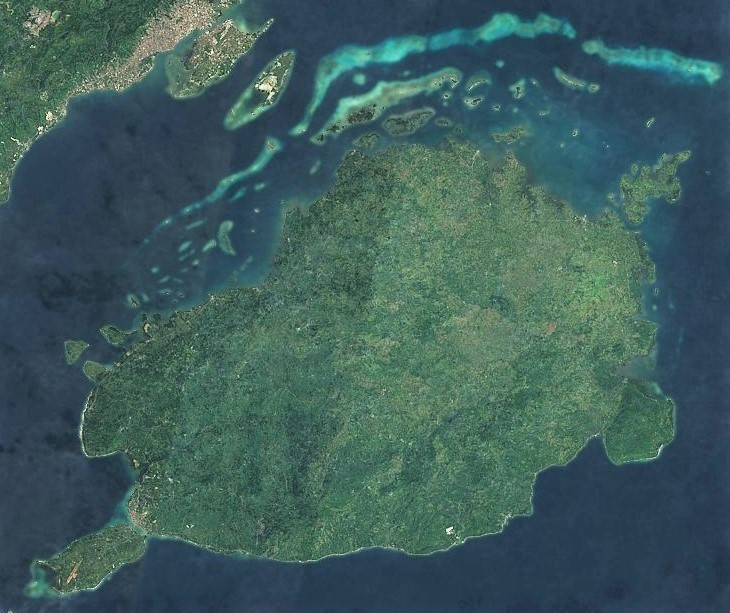
Satellite image of the island of Bohol

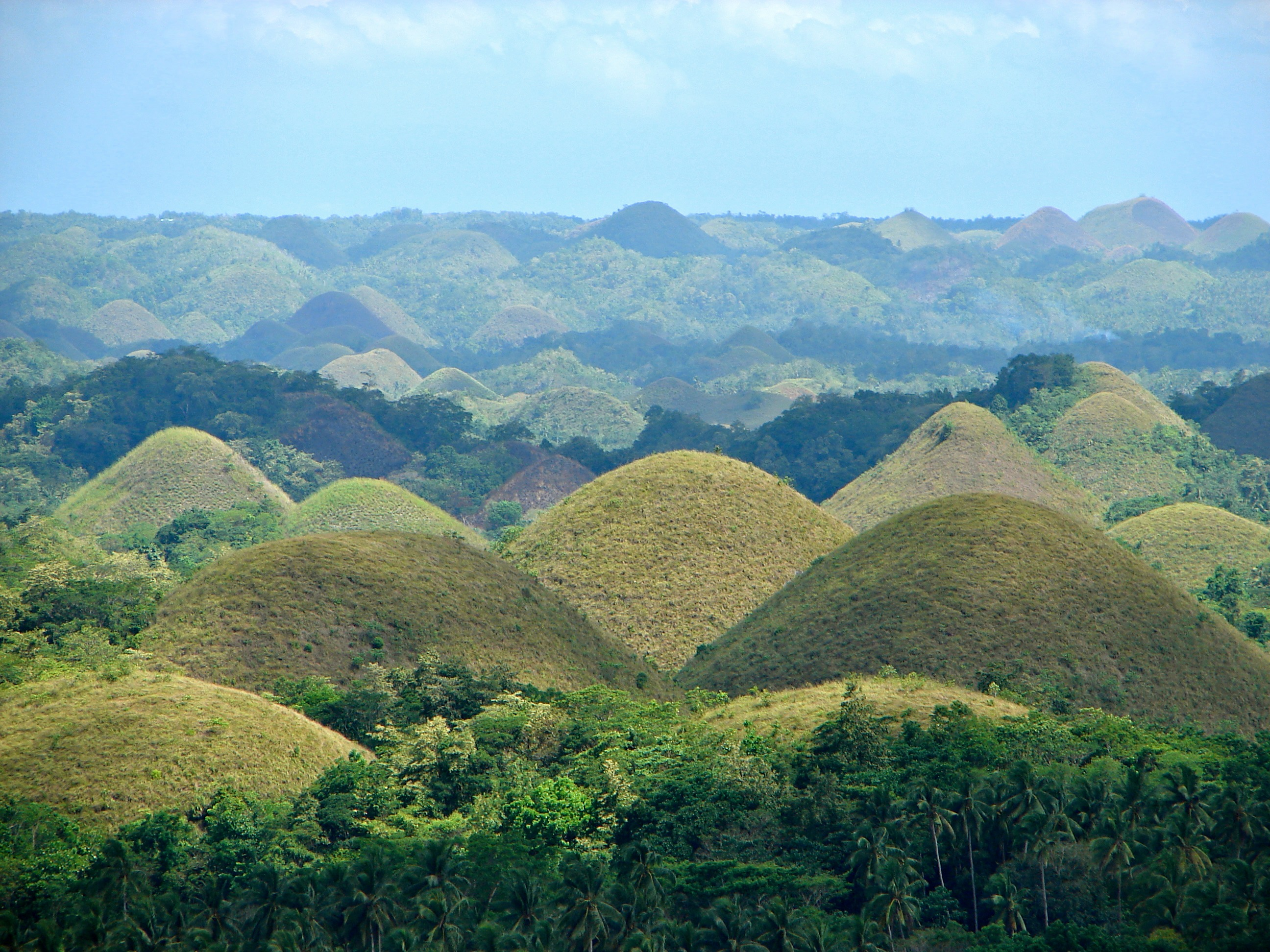
The Chocolate Hills of Bohol

To the west of Bohol is Cebu, to the northeast is the island of Leyte and to the south, across the Bohol Sea, is Mindanao. The Cebu Strait separates Bohol from Cebu, and both island provinces share a common language, but Boholano retains a conscious distinction from Cebuano. Bohol's climate is generally dry, with maximum rainfall between the months of June and October. The interior is cooler than the coast.

=== Physical features ===
With a land area of 4,821 km^{2} (1,861 sq mi) and a coastline 261 km (162 mi) long, Bohol is the tenth largest island of the Philippines. The main island is surrounded by about 70 smaller islands, the largest of which are Panglao Island, facing Tagbilaran, in the southwest and Lapinig Island in the northeast.

The terrain of Bohol is basically rolling and hilly, and about half the island is covered in limestone. Near the outer areas of the island are low mountain ranges. The interior is a large plateau with irregular landforms.

Near Carmen, the Chocolate Hills are more than 1,200 uniformly cone-shaped hills named for the grass growing on the hills that turns brown in the summer, making the landscape look like chocolate mounds. They are hills made of limestone left over from coral reefs during the Ice Age when the island was submerged. The Chocolate Hills are considered one of Philippine's natural wonders and Bohol is often referred to as the Jewel of the Philippines. They appear on the provincial seal of Bohol.

Bohol has 114 springs, 172 creeks, and four main rivers that run through Bohol with a radial drainage pattern. The largest river, the Inabanga, runs in the northwestern part of the province; the Loboc River drains the center of the island to the mid-southern coast; the Abatan River runs in the southwest, and Ipil River in the north. The only natural lake in the province is Cabilao Island Lake, also called Lake Danao or Lanao, on Cabilao Island.

Numerous waterfalls and caves are scattered across the island, including Mag‑Aso Falls in Antequera. Mag‑Aso means smoke in the native tongue. The water is cool and often creates a mist in humid mornings which can hide the falls.

The Rajah Sikatuna Protected Landscape protects Bohol's largest remaining lowland forest and can be found in the island's southern portion near Bilar.

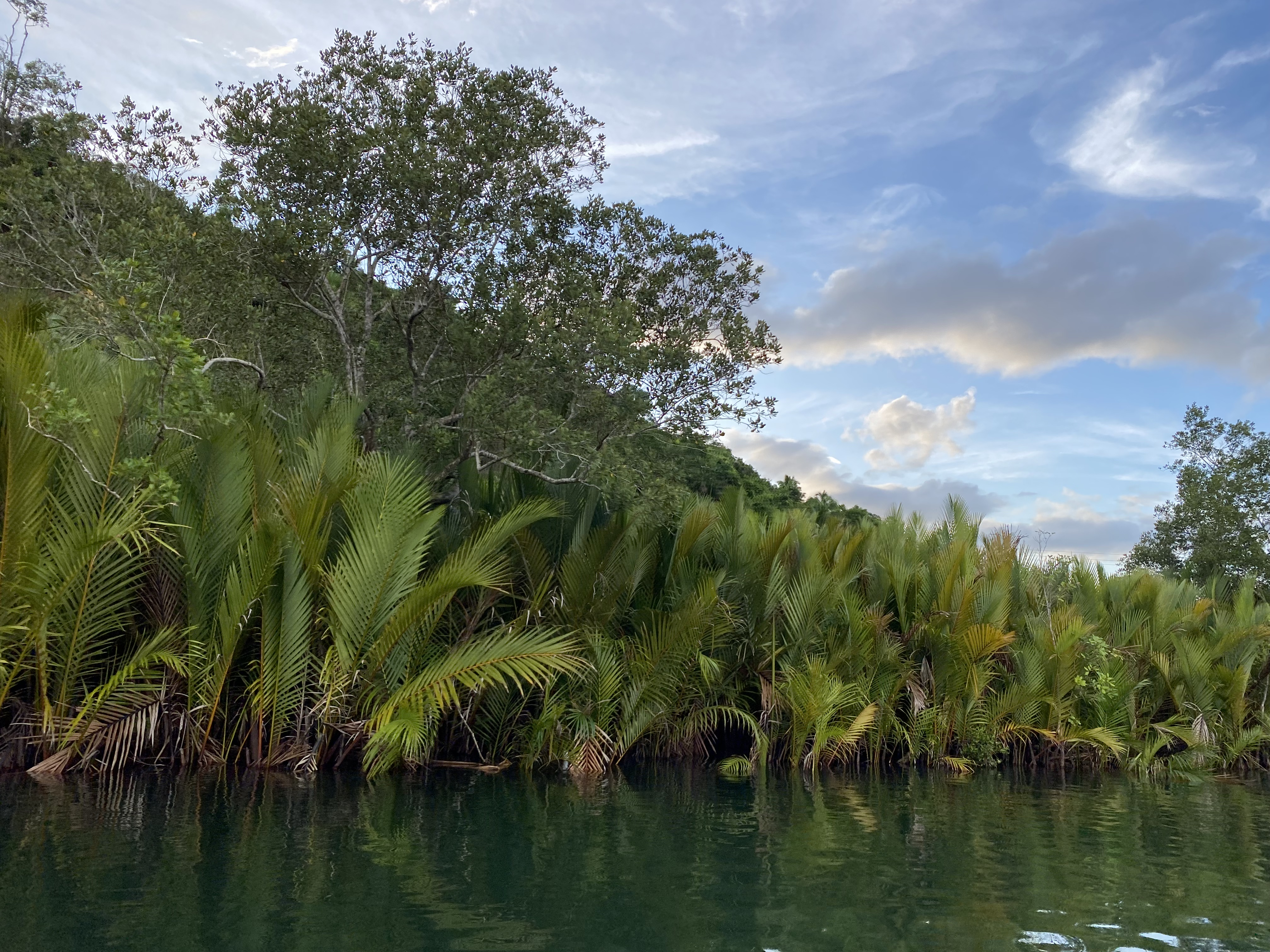
Abatan River mangroves

==== Rivers ====
List of rivers in Bohol by length:

- Inabanga River
- Loboc River
- Abatan River
- Soom River

==== Islands ====
The 85 outlying islands surrounding mainland Bohol under the jurisdiction of the Bohol Provincial Government are:

- Bagatusan
- Bagong Banwa
- Balicasag
- Banacon
- Banbanon
- Bansaan
- Bantigue
- Basihan
- Batasan
- Bay Sa Owak
- Bilangbilangan
- Bonbon
- Bongan
- Bosaan
- Buabuahan
- Budlaan
- Budlanan
- Bugatusan
- Busalian
- Butan
- Cabilao
- Cabul‑an
- Cabantulan
- Cabgan
- Calangaman
- Cancostino
- Calituban
- Cataban
- Catang
- Cati‑il
- Cuaming
- Dumog
- Gak‑ang
- Gaus
- Guindacpan
- Hambongan
- Hayaan
- Hingutanan
- Inanuran
- Jagoliao
- Jandayan
- Jao
- Juagdan
- Lamanok
- Lapinig (Bonoon)
- Lapinig Grande (Pitogo)
- Lapinig Chico (Tres Reyes)
- Limasoc
- Lumislis
- Mahaba
- Ma‑agpit
- Mahanay
- Makaina
- Makalingao
- Malingin
- Mantatao Daku
- Mantatao Gamay
- Maomauan
- Maubay
- Macaboc
- Nasingin
- Nocnocan
- Pamasuan
- Pamilacan
- Pandanon
- Pandao
- Panga
- Pangangan
- Pangapasan
- Panglao
- Pinango
- Potohan
- Pungtud
- Saag
- Sagasa
- Sandingan
- Silo
- Tabangdio
- Tabaon
- Tambo
- Tangtaang
- Tilmobo
- Tintinan
- Tumok
- Ubay

=== Tarsier ===
In 1996 the Philippine Tarsier Foundation was established in Corella, Bohol in efforts to help conserve and protect tarsiers and their habitat. Forest and habitat sanctuaries have been created to ensure the safety of tarsiers while allowing visitors to roam and discover these miniature primates in their natural habitats.

The tarsier is the smallest living primate and exists in several Southeast Asian countries today. The Philippine tarsier, Tarsius syrichta, locally known as "mamag" in Boholano is near to threatened according to the IUCN Red List of Endangered Species. Adaptation to their large bulging eyes allows them to catch prey clearly at night, and with elongated limbs and fingers, leaping from tree to tree gives no limitation to the tarsier. Their brain is about the same size as their eyes. The connection between its eyes and brain serves a unique function to these animals which is important for their stability and balance. Tarsiers have incredible hearing abilities. They can hear a frequency of up to 91 kHz (kilohertz) and send sounds of 70 kHz.

=== Climate ===
From November to April, the northeast monsoon (amihan) prevails. Except for a rare shower, this is the mildest time of the year. Daytime temperatures average 28 °C (82 °F), cooling at night to around 25 °C (77 °F). The summer season from May to July brings higher temperatures and very humid days. From August to October is the southwest monsoon (habagat). The weather during this season is not very predictable, with weeks of calm weather alternating with rainy days. It can rain any day of the year, but a higher chance of heavy showers occurs from November to January.

=== Geologic formation ===
The formation of the island of Bohol began during the Late Jurassic Period (about 160 to 145 million years ago). It was still submerged except for what is now Mt. Malibalibod in Ubay and its adjacent area in Alicia, Bohol. Approximately 66 million years ago, at the end of the Cretaceous Period, the northern portion of the island began to rise gradually. Volcanic activity during the time caused the deposition of numerous layers of volcanic rock in the region. Land mass increased and grew at the beginning of the Paleogene Period (about 60 million years ago). During this period, diorite, a form of igneous rock, was introduced into the Talibon area. Between the Eocene and Oligocene epochs, the island's development was halted for millions of years. At the beginning of the Miocene epoch (about 23 million years ago), the island's geologic evolution continued. The combination of uplift and volcanism resulted in the deposition of limestone and the expulsion of andesite, a form of volcanic rock. Only the eastern half of the island was above water during this time. Approximately 5 million years ago, the southeastern portion of the island began to emerge from the ocean. From the late Pliocene to the Pleistocene (approximately 3.6 to 1.8 million years ago), the rest of the once-submerged portion of the island of Bohol rose to the surface, giving the island its present form.

== Demographics ==
Population census of Bohol

Year	Pop.	±% p.a.
1903	269,223	—
1918	358,387	+1.93%
1939	491,608	+1.52%
1948	553,407	+1.32%
1960	592,194	+0.57%
1970	683,297	+1.44%
1975	759,370	+2.14%
1980	806,013	+1.20%

Year	Pop.	±% p.a.
1990	948,403	+1.64%
1995	994,440	+0.89%
2000	1,139,130	+2.95%
2007	1,230,110	+1.07%
2010	1,255,128	+0.74%
2015	1,313,560	+0.87%
2020	1,394,329	+1.26%
2024	1,412,726	+0.32%

Source: Philippine Statistics Authority

According to the 2024 census, it has a population of 1,412,726 people.

Boholano people, a distinct ethnic subgroup of Cebuano, comprise the majority of Bohol with many residents in Southern Leyte and northern parts of Mindanao. Eskayans, a distinct ethnic group also native in Bohol, are residents of the forest hinterland interior of the southeastern municipalities of Duero, Guindulman, Pilar and Sierra Bullones. Residing sizeably in the province are the non-natives that include Cebuanos (from the northeast), Butuanons, Surigaonon (both from the Caraga in Mindanao) Hiligaynons, Ilocanos (from Panay, Negros Occidental and Ilocandia respectively, either directly or via Mindanao where they also both significantly reside), and Warays (from Eastern Visayas).

=== Languages ===
Majority of Boholano residents speak Bohol Cebuano, a dialect of Cebuano native to the province. It also has speakers in Southern Leyte and in northern parts of Mindanao. Boholanos can also speak and understand standard Cebuano. Tagalog and English are mainly used for business, government affairs and in local academe. Eskayans has an artificial language of their own of the same name with its own alphabet. It is considered endangered language, leading to efforts to preserve the language by volunteers within the Eskayan community to teach it to younger fellow Eskayans. Butuanon, Surigaonon, Hiligaynon, Ilocano and Waray are also spoken varyingly in the province.

== Government ==
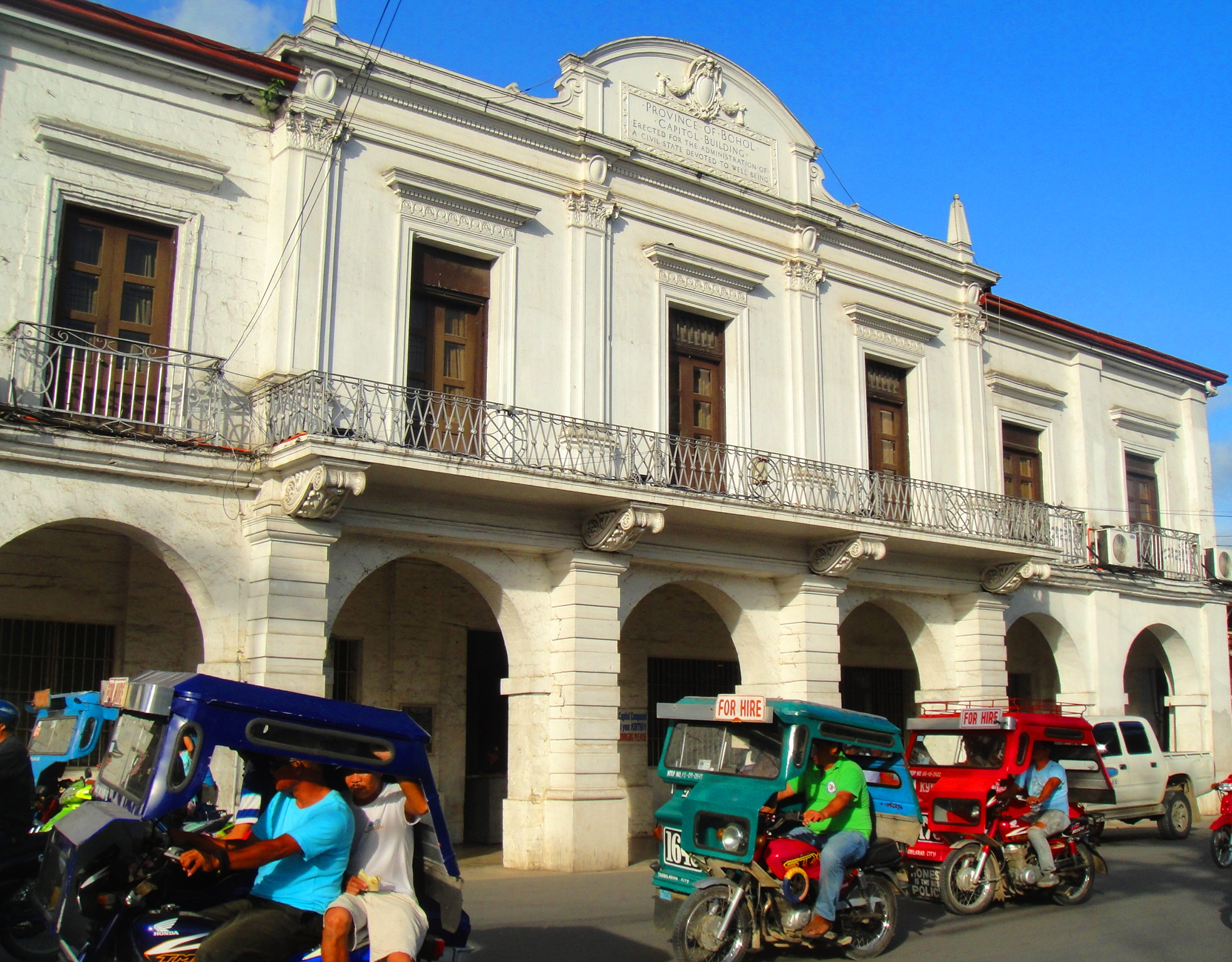
Old Provincial Capitol of Bohol in Tagbilaran, now housing the National Museum of the Philippines - Bohol

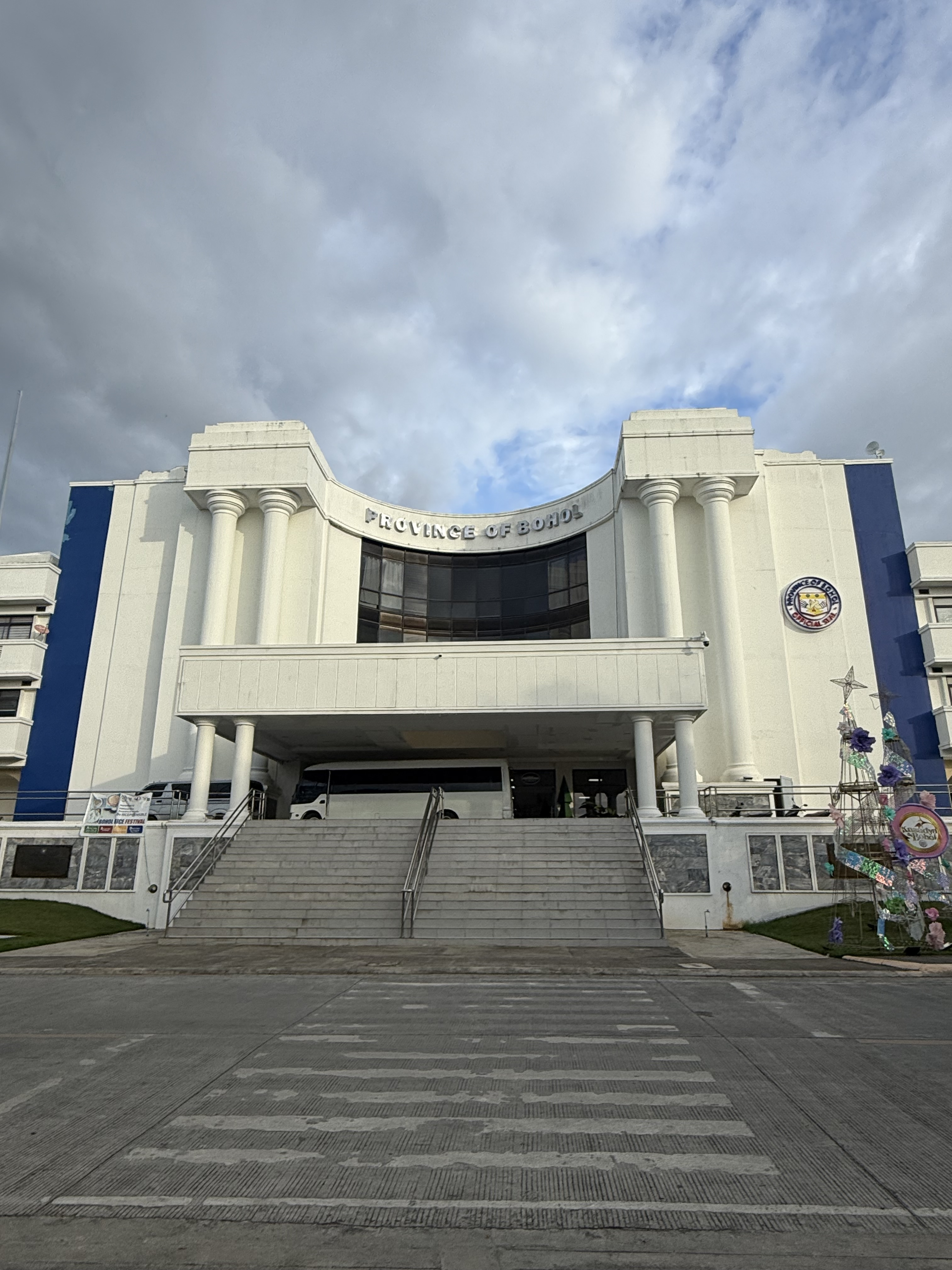
New Provincial Capitol of Bohol

=== Legislative districts ===
- Governor: Erico Aristotle C. Aumentado (PFP)
- Vice Governor: Nicanor Sarabia Besas (Nacionalista)

19th Congress

1st Congressional District
John Geesnell "Baba" Yap LDP
City / Municipality	Electorate 2025
Alburquerque	8,039
Antequera	10,559
Baclayon	14,164
Balilihan	15,251
Calape	23,428
Catigbian	16,873
Corella	6,397
Cortes	12,359
Dauis	32,679
Loon	30,645
Maribojoc	14,952
Panglao	29,494
Sikatuna	5,316
Tagbilaran	74,277
Tubigon	33,429

2nd Congressional District
Ma. Vanessa Cadorna-Aumentado Lakas-CMD
Municipality	Electorate 2025
Bien Unido	19,271
Buenavista	22,943
Clarin	16,673
Dagohoy	14,027
Danao	14,409
Getafe	22,773
Inabanga	33,493
President Carlos P. Garcia	17,356
Sagbayan	17,494
San Isidro	7,407
San Miguel	18,216
Talibon	45,197
Trinidad	24,564
Ubay	53,114

3rd Congressional District
Kristine Alexie Besas-Tutor Lakas-CMD
Municipality	Electorate 2025
Alicia	18,056
Anda	13,774
Batuan	10,601
Bilar	13,738
Candijay	22,114
Carmen	35,223
Dimiao	11,129
Duero	14,421
Garcia Hernandez	17,183
Guindulman	24,399
Jagna	24,536
Sevilla	8,236
Lila	7,910
Loay	13,022
Loboc	14,163
Mabini	20,406
Pilar	20,028
Sierra Bullones	18,517
Valencia	19,309

1st District	327,862

2nd District	326,937

3rd District	326,765

Total 949,791

=== List of governors ===
Governors of Bohol

1. SPANISH PERIOD (from 1854 – 1898)
Guillermo Kirk Patrict	March 3, 1854 – 1857	First Governor
Juan Garcia Navarro	March 4, 1854 – 1859	
Anastacio de Hoyos y Zendegni	March 10, 1859 – 1860	Bohol was reverted as part of Cebu. Lieutenant Governor was in-charge
Herrera Davilla	1860	He came to wind up the papers of Bohol
Juan Garcia Navarro	1860 – 1861	Officially no longer a Governor but empowered to act for matters he started as Governor
Jose Diaz Quintana	1860 – 1864	Bohol was part of Cebu
Antonio Martinez y San Juan	October 1, 1864 – 1872	Bohol was again separated from Cebu
Don Lemolino	1872	Died shortly after assuming office
Joaquin Bengoechea	June 1872 – 1878	
Adolfo Martin de Banos	September 1878 – 1882	
Manuel Alcobendes	1882 – 1883	
Francisco Agusto Linares y Pombo	February 1883 – December 1889	
Adolfo Martin de Banos	December 11, 1889 – 1892	
Eustacio Gonzales Liquiniano	1892 – 1896	
Eduardo Esteller	1897 – 1898	Last Spanish Governor of Bohol

2. REVOLUTIONARY GOVERNOR
Bernabe Fortich Reyes	1898 – 1900	First Governor

3. AMERICAN PERIOD
Anecito Velez Clarin	March 15, 1901 – February 20, 1904	He was appointed because he was not a revolutionary
Salustiano Borja	March 15, 1904 – February 28, 1907	First governor elected under the American Regime

4. PHILIPPINE LEGISLATURE
Macario F. Sarmiento	March 1, 1907 – December 31, 1909	
Fernando G. Rocha	January 6, 1910 – October 15, 1912	
Fernando G. Rocha	October 16, 1912 – October 15, 1916	Re-elected
Eutiquio O. Boyles	October 16, 1916 – October 15, 1919	
Juan Torralba	October 16, 1919 – July 20, 1922	
Juan Torralba	October 15, 1922 – October 15, 1925	Re-elected
Filomeno Orbeta Caseñas	October 16, 1925 – October 15, 1928	
Filomeno Orbeta Caseñas	October 16, 1928 – October 15, 1931	Re-elected
Celestino Barel Gallares	October 16, 1931 – October 15, 1934	
Carlos Polistico Garcia	October 16, 1934 – December 1937	

5. COMMONWEALTH PERIOD
Carlos Polistico Garcia	January 2, 1938 – January 1, 1941	Re-elected
Agapito Hontanosas	August 29, 1941 – May 20, 1942	Appointed / Governor under the Japanese
Condrado Marapao	May 22, 1942 – May 31, 1946	Appointed / Governor of the Free Local Government approved by President Manuel Quezon

6. THIRD PHILIPPINE REPUBLIC
Perfecto Balili	June 1, 1946 – December 31, 1947	Appointed
Jacinto Borja	January 1, 1948 – December 31, 1951	Elected
Juan Pajo	January 1, 1952 – December 31, 1953	Elected
Juan Pajo	1955 – 1957	Re-elected
Esteban Bernido	February 4, 1958 – 1961	Appointed
Esteban Bernido	January 1962 – November 1965	Elected
Esteban Bernido	January 1966 – June 7, 1967	Re-elected / Resigned - appointed as PHHC manager
Lino Ibarra Chatto	June 8, 1967 – December 1968	Appointed
Lino Ibarra Chatto	June 1968 – December 1971	Elected
Lino Ibarra Chatto	January 1, 1972 – March 3, 1978	Re-elected
Esteban Bernido	March 1978 – October 12, 1978	Appointed
Rolando Butalid	October 13, 1978 – March 15, 1986	
Victor dela Serna	March 16, 1986 – October 26, 1987	OIC
Constancio Chatto Torralba	October 27, 1987 – December 1, 1987	OIC
Asterio V. Akiatan	December 2, 1987 – February 1, 1988	
Constancio Chatto Torralba	February 2, 1988 – June 30, 1992	Elected
David Belarmino Tirol	June 30, 1992 – June 30, 1995	Elected
Rene Lopez Relampagos	June 30, 1995 - June 30, 2001	
Erico Boyles Aumentado	June 30, 2001 – June 30, 2010	
Edgardo Migriño Chatto	June 30, 2010 – June 30, 2019	
Arthur Cua Yap	June 30, 2019 – June 30, 2022	
Erico Aristotle Aumentado	June 30, 2022 -	

== Administrative divisions ==
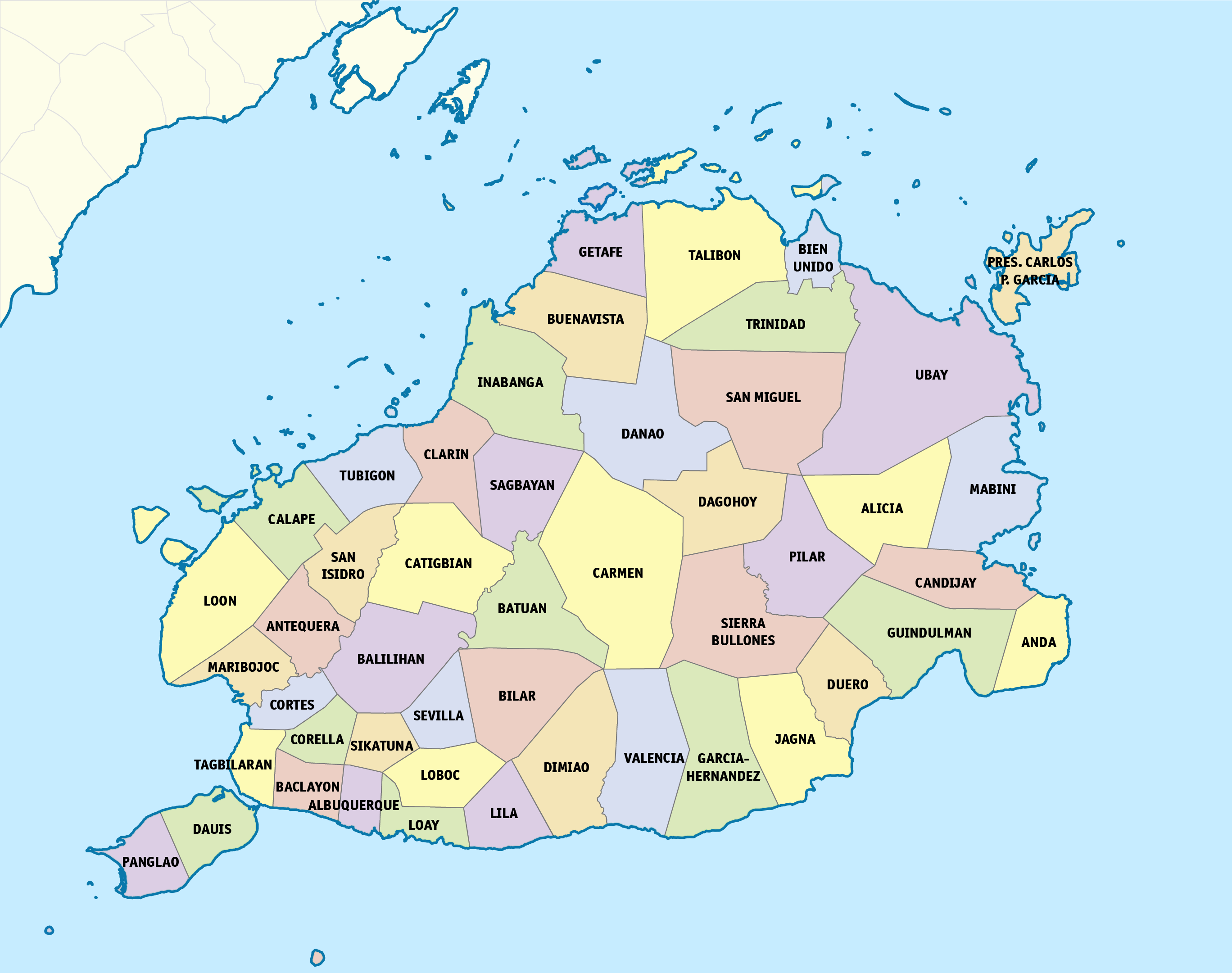
Political map of Bohol

There are 47 municipalities, 1 component city, and 1,109 barangays in Bohol.

- † Provincial capital and component city
- Municipality

Municipality or city		District	Area		Population (2020)		Density		No. of barangays	Coordinates^{[A]}
Municipality or city		District	km^{2}	/mi^{2}		%	/km^{2}	/mi^{2}	No. of barangays	Coordinates^{[A]}
Alburquerque		I	26.98	10.42	11,246	0.8%	420	1,100	11	9°36′37″N 123°57′26″E
Alicia		III	114.50	44.21	24,374	1.7%	210	540	15	9°53′55″N 124°26′27″E
Anda		III	61.89	23.90	17,778	1.3%	290	750	16	9°44′43″N 124°34′35″E
Antequera		I	118.60	45.79	14,990	1.1%	130	340	21	9°46′52″N 123°53′52″E
Baclayon		I	34.43	13.29	22,461	1.6%	650	1,700	17	9°37′21″N 123°54′42″E
Balilihan		I	127.27	49.14	18,694	1.3%	150	390	31	9°45′22″N 123°58′18″E
Batuan		III	48.79	18.84	13,845	1%	280	730	15	9°47′02″N 124°08′57″E
Bien Unido		II	27.39	10.58	26,666	1.9%	970	2,500	15	10°08′16″N 124°22′44″E
Bilar		III	129.71	50.08	18,512	18512%	140	360	19	9°42′25″N 124°06′16″E
Buenavista		II	96.00	37.07	29,711	2.1%	310	800	35	10°04′54″N 124°06′33″E
Calape		I	75.36	29.10	33,079	2.4%	440	1,100	33	9°53′26″N 123°52′18″E
Candijay		III	103.26	39.87	30,119	2.2%	290	750	21	9°49′02″N 124°29′46″E
Carmen		III	239.45	92.45	49,191	3.5%	210	540	29	9°49′29″N 124°11′51″E
Catigbian		I	113.33	43.76	23,805	1.7%	210	540	22	9°51′03″N 124°00′00″E
Clarin		II	52.12	20.12	21,158	1.5%	410	1,100	24	9°57′45″N 124°01′28″E
Corella		I	37.22	14.37	9,479	0.7%	250	650	8	9°41′14″N 123°55′17″E
Cortes		I	27.32	10.55	18,344	1.3%	670	1,700	14	9°43′21″N 123°52′45″E
Dagohoy		II	77.59	29.96	19,874	1.4%	260	670	15	9°56′11″N 124°18′55″E
Danao		II	162.76	62.84	20,245	1.5%	120	310	17	9°56′41″N 124°13′19″E
Dauis		I	43.33	16.73	52,492	3.8%	1,200	3,100	12	9°37′26″N 123°51′59″E
Dimiao		III	135.75	52.41	14,889	1.1%	110	280	35	9°36′21″N 124°09′45″E
Duero		III	97.30	37.57	18,861	1.4%	190	490	21	9°42′22″N 124°24′19″E
Garcia Hernandez		III	84.62	32.67	24,430	1.8%	290	750	30	9°36′49″N 124°17′42″E
Getafe (Jetafe)		II	179.17	69.18	33,422	2.4%	190	490	24	10°08′59″N 124°09′12″E
Guindulman		III	125.63	48.51	34,104	2.4%	270	700	19	9°45′42″N 124°29′15″E
Inabanga		II	168.49	65.05	48,534	3.5%	290	750	50	10°01′56″N 124°03′59″E
Jagna		III	120.50	46.53	35,832	2.6%	300	780	33	9°39′00″N 124°21′58″E
Lila		III	40.50	15.64	12,240	0.9%	300	780	18	9°35′26″N 124°05′43″E
Loay		III	48.24	18.63	17,855	1.3%	370	960	24	9°36′00″N 124°00′38″E
Loboc		III	57.65	22.26	17,418	1.2%	300	780	28	9°38′11″N 124°01′54″E
Loon		I	113.36	43.77	44,224	3.2%	390	1,000	67	9°47′56″N 123°47′37″E
Mabini		III	104.57	40.37	28,701	2.1%	270	700	22	9°51′54″N 124°31′11″E
Maribojoc		I	49.35	19.05	22,178	1.6%	450	1,200	22	9°44′27″N 123°50′34″E
Panglao		I	47.79	18.45	39,839	2.9%	830	2,100	10	9°34′46″N 123°44′45″E
Pilar		III	120.39	46.48	28,693	2.1%	240	620	21	9°51′14″N 124°20′51″E
President Carlos P. Garcia		II	54.82	21.17	23,625	1.7%	430	1,100	23	10°07′15″N 124°33′13″E
Sagbayan		II	69.61	26.88	24,335	1.7%	350	910	24	9°54′47″N 124°05′36″E
San Isidro		II	60.04	23.18	9,909	0.7%	170	440	12	9°51′33″N 123°57′23″E
San Miguel		II	123.29	47.60	25,356	1.8%	210	540	18	9°59′11″N 124°20′19″E
Sevilla		III	116.75	45.08	11,376	0.8%	97	250	13	9°42′12″N 124°02′47″E
Sierra Bullones		III	198.87	76.78	26,095	1.9%	130	340	22	9°48′28″N 124°17′29″E
Sikatuna		I	38.22	14.76	6,906	0.5%	180	470	10	9°41′16″N 123°58′26″E
Tagbilaran City	†	I	36.50	14.09	104,976	7.5%	2,900	7,500	15	9°38′26″N 123°51′23″E
Talibon		II	140.46	54.23	71,272	5.1%	510	1,300	25	10°08′57″N 124°19′29″E
Trinidad		II	195.30	75.41	35,119	2.5%	180	470	20	10°04′38″N 124°20′36″E
Tubigon		I	81.87	31.61	47,886	3.4%	580	1,500	34	9°57′05″N 123°57′42″E
Ubay		II	335.06	129.37	81,799	5.9%	240	620	44	10°03′29″N 124°28′18″E
Valencia		III	116.67	45.05	28,392	2%	240	620	35	9°36′33″N 124°12′18″E
1. ^{↑}Coordinates mark the city/town center, and are sortable by latitude.; 2. Getafe is also spelled as Jetafe.

== Economy ==
Poverty incidence of Bohol (%)

Source: Philippine Statistics Authority

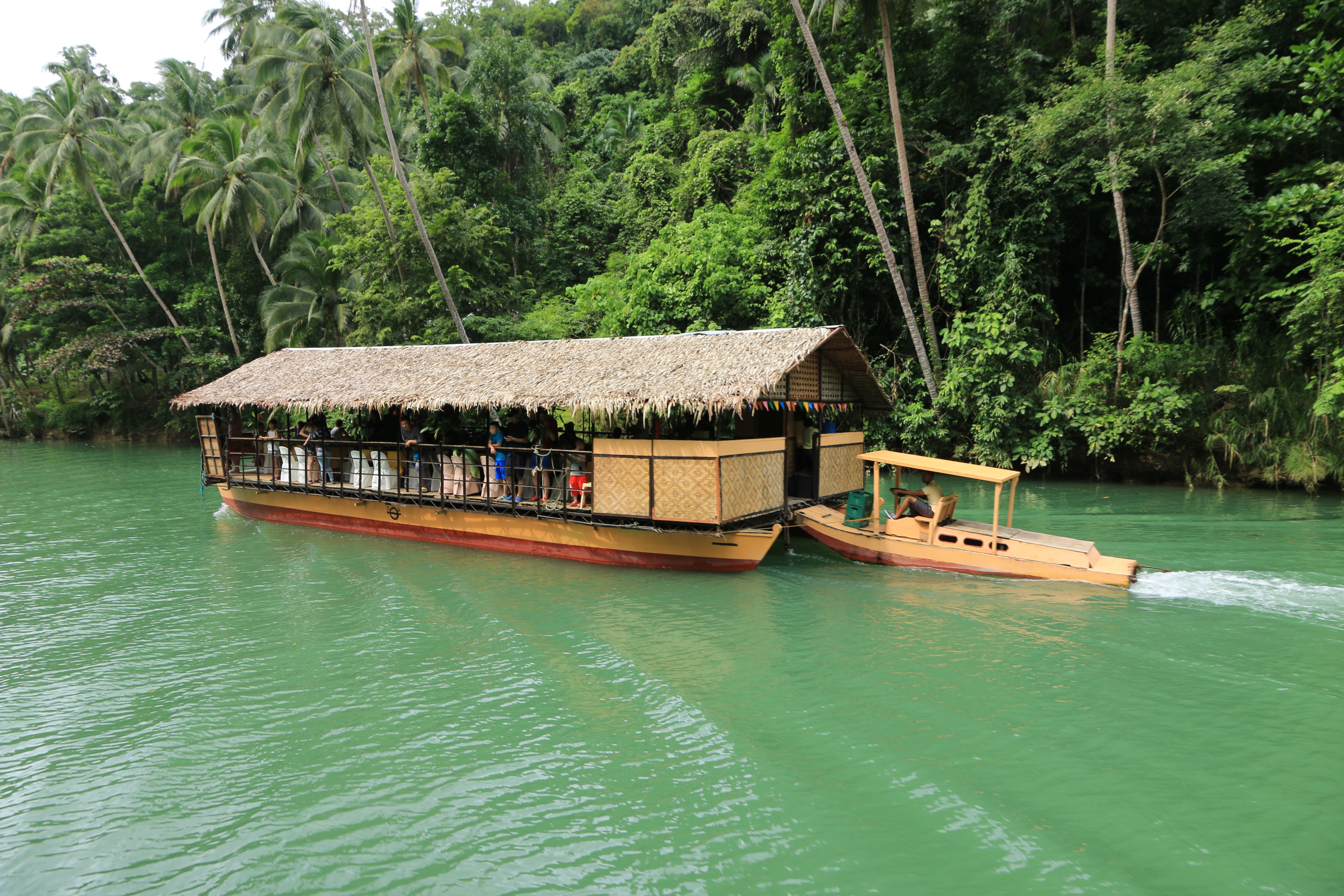
The Loboc River cruise is one of the popular tourist attractions in the island.

Tourism plays an increasing role in the island's economy. The Bohol-Panglao International Airport is active since 2018 for domestic flights and international flights since 2023. The airport houses the most-visited and accessible beaches in the province. Proponents of the scheme hope that the new airport will increase Bohol's reputation as an international tourist destination although the plan has been dogged by ongoing criticism.

Scuba Diving and Free Diving are among Bohol's tourism industry driving forces. Panglao is the leader with more than 70 scuba diving centers and free-diving operators due to its numerous dive sites, including Pamilacan. The municipality of Dauis is the runner up in the province with many diving facilities directed to Pamilacan and Napaling. Anda and Cabilao also show some prominence in growing the diving industry in Bohol. Due to rapid growth, private and public regulatory organizations are protecting the marine environment from manmade damages.

Other than its growing tourism industry, Bohol has also been an emerging business process outsourcing (BPO) hub, and has fostered over four BPO firms in the province, with worldwide BPO companies such as Sagility, Genpact, TaskUs, and Ibex Global, most of which are sited in Tagbilaran City, the province's capital and largest city. In 2023, industries such as agriculture, forestry, and fishery surged with a 7.1 percent growth rate. Other industries such as services, accommodation and food services, and transportation and storage also grew substantially.

== Festivals ==
- Sandugo (July 1–31)
- Tagbilaran City Fiesta (May 1)
- Calape Fiesta (May 10)
- Raffia Festival (June 29–30) – Inabanga, Bohol
- Saulog Tagbilaran in honor to Saint Joseph the Worker
- Bolibong Kingking (May 23–24) – Loboc, Bohol
- Pana-ad sa Loboc (Holy Thursday & Good Friday) – Loboc
- SidlaKasilak – Loon (Fiesta Week: August 30 – September 8)
- Sambat Mascara y Regatta (1st Saturday of December) – Loay, Bohol
- Suroy sa Musikero (December 25 February 25–2) – Loboc
- Bohol Fiestas (month of May)
- Ubi (January)
- Tigum Bol-anon Tibuok Kalibutan or TBTK – "A gathering of Boholanos from different parts of the world and the name for such a grand event"
- Hudyaka sa Panglao (August 27–28) Panglao, Bohol
- Sinulog (3rd Saturday of January) – Valencia, Bohol
- Dujan (3rd to last week of January) – Anda
- Sinuog Estokada (September 28–29) – Jagna
- Chocolate Hills – Carmen
- Alimango Festival – Mabini
- Humay– Candijay
- Guimbawan – Batuan
- Ispadahay – San Miguel
- Karomata Festival (May 14–15) - Trinidad

== Infrastructure ==
=== Airport ===
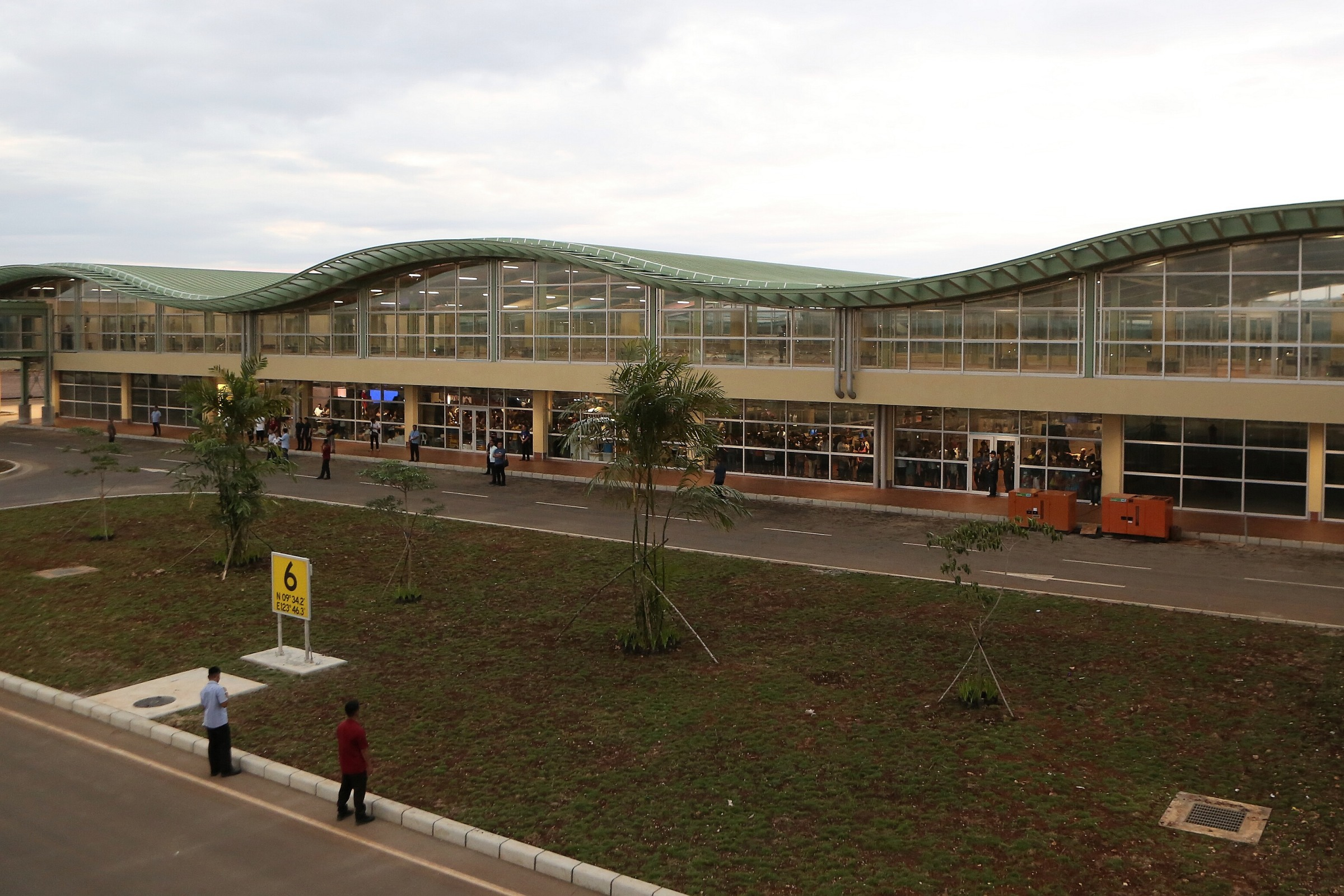
Exterior of the Bohol–Panglao International Airport.

The province's main airport is the Bohol–Panglao International Airport on Panglao Island. It replaced Tagbilaran Airport in November 2018 and serves as the gateway to Panglao Island and the rest of mainland Bohol for domestic air travelers. The airport is officially classified as an international airport by the Civil Aviation Authority of the Philippines. Direct Bohol - Seoul-Incheon flight was inaugurated on June 22, 2017. It was previously served Chengdu - Bohol flights, but was halted in 2020 amid the pandemic.

=== Seaports ===
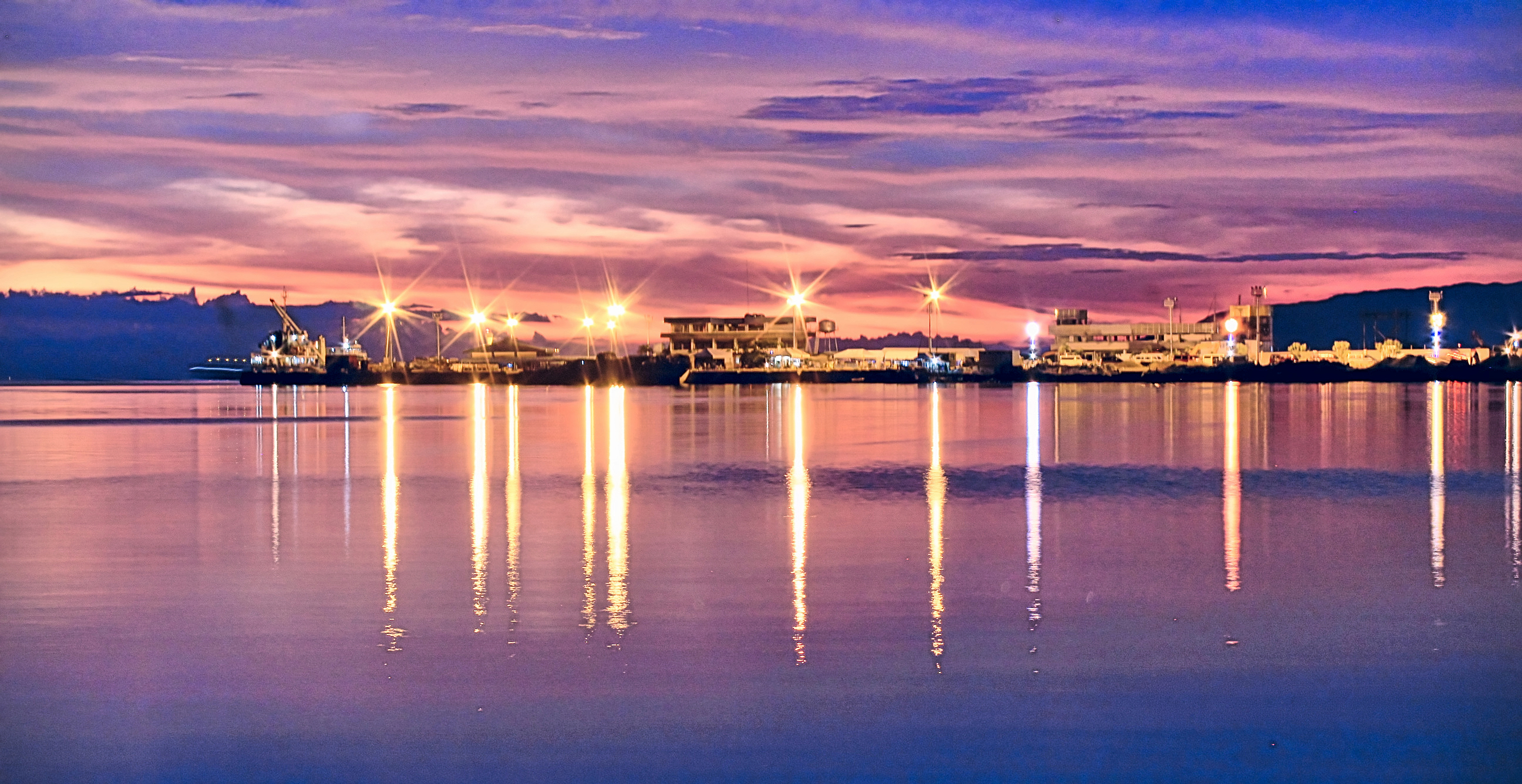
Sunset at Tagbilaran Sea Port

Port of Tubigon, the busiest among the smaller ports, offers more than ten daily round trips plying the Cebu-Bohol route, including fast-craft and roll-on/roll-off. Catagbacan Port in Loon serves the roll-on roll-off services between Argao and Sibonga in Cebu. Port of Jagna offers service between Bohol and Opol, Cagayan de Oro, Camiguin (Balbagon and Benoni), and Nasipit with (with roll-on/roll-off) routes.

The port of Ubay is the province's gateway to Eastern Visayas which offers round trips to Bato, Hilongos, and Maasin City. It also offers daily round trips to Cebu City. The second port of Ubay, the Tapal Wharf, located in barangay Tapal, caters for the daily President Carlos P. Garcia-Bohol mainland routes.

The ports of Buenavista, Clarin, Getafe, and Talibon also offer daily round trips to Cebu. Other known commercial passenger seaports are located in Baclayon, Buen Unido, and Pres. Carlos P. Garcia.

== Education ==
The literacy rate of the province of Bohol is high at 98%.

Institutions of Higher Learning are:

- Bohol Island State University (BISU)
  - BISU Main Campus - Tagbilaran City
    - BISU Main Campus - Bingag, Dauis Extension
  - BISU Balilihan Campus
  - BISU Bilar Campus
  - BISU Candijay Campus
  - BISU Calape Campus
  - BISU Clarin Campus
- Holy Name University (HNU)
- Holy Spirit School of Tagbilaran (HSST)
- University of Bohol (UB)
- Tagbilaran City College (TCC)
- BIT International College (BIT-IC)
- Immaculate Heart of Mary Seminary
- Mater Dei College
- ACLC College of Tagbilaran
- PMI Colleges Bohol
- Bohol Northern Star Colleges
- Blessed Trinity College (BTC)
- Bohol Northwestern College
- Cristal e-College
- Colegio De Getafe
- Batuan Colleges Inc. (BCI)
- Buenavista Community College (BCC)
- Talibon Polytechnic College (TPC)
- Trinidad Municipal College (TMC)
- Asian Divine Light College
- Bohol College of Science and Technology
- Bohol International Learning College (BILC)
- Ubay Community College (UCC)

== Media ==
Bohol has 2 major AM radio stations, DYRD and DYTR, both based in Tagbilaran City. Another AM radio station, DYZD, based in Ubay, is being operated by DYRD. Both DYRD and DYTR also operate FM stations with the same names, with other FM stations operating in different parts of Bohol. There are multiple weekly or twice weekly newspapers like Bohol Tribune (formerly Sunday Post), Bohol Times, Bohol Standard, Bohol Bantay Balita, and Bohol Chronicle. An online news website called Bohol News Daily aggregates news from various sources.

== Gallery ==
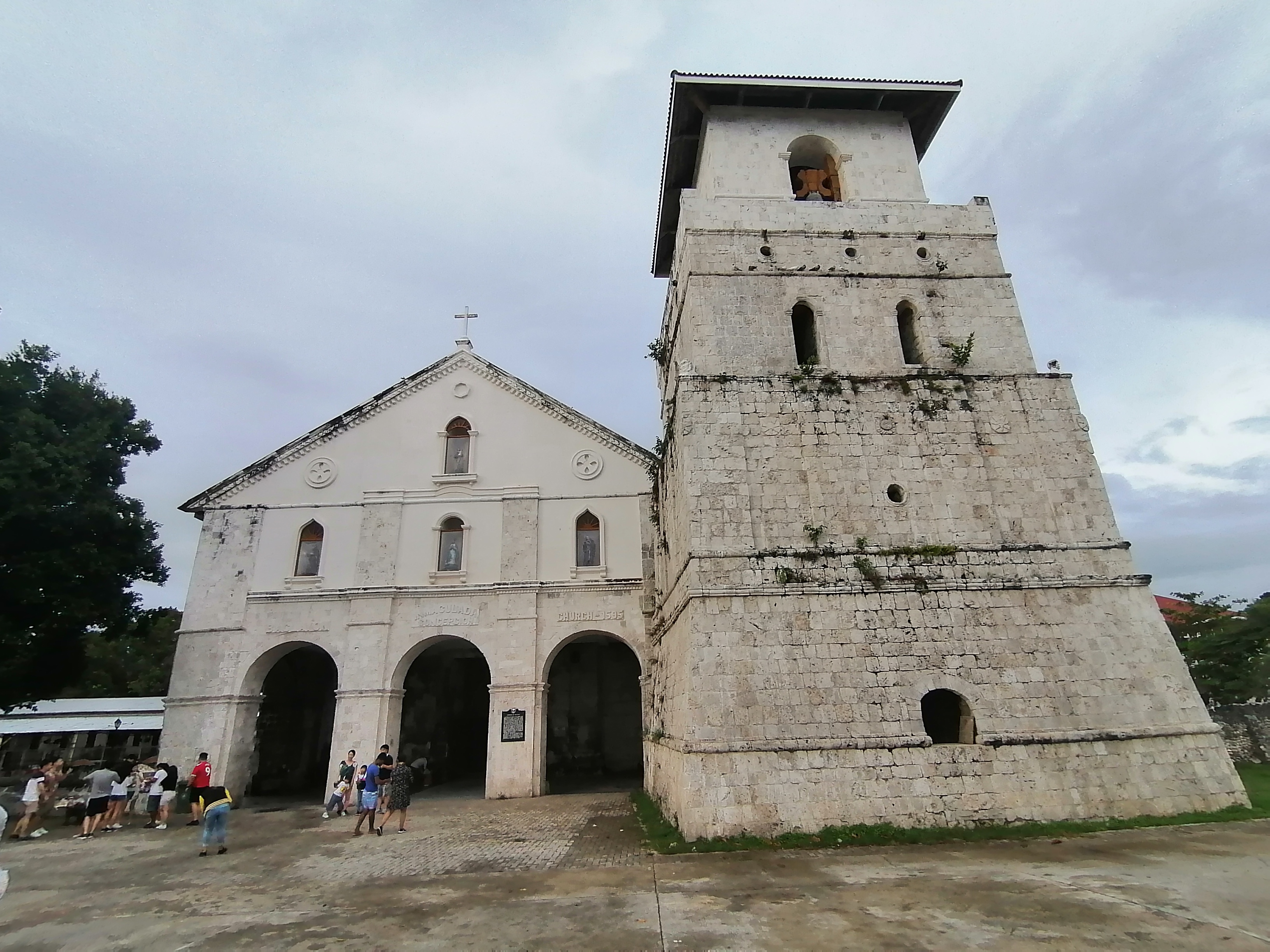
Baclayon Church

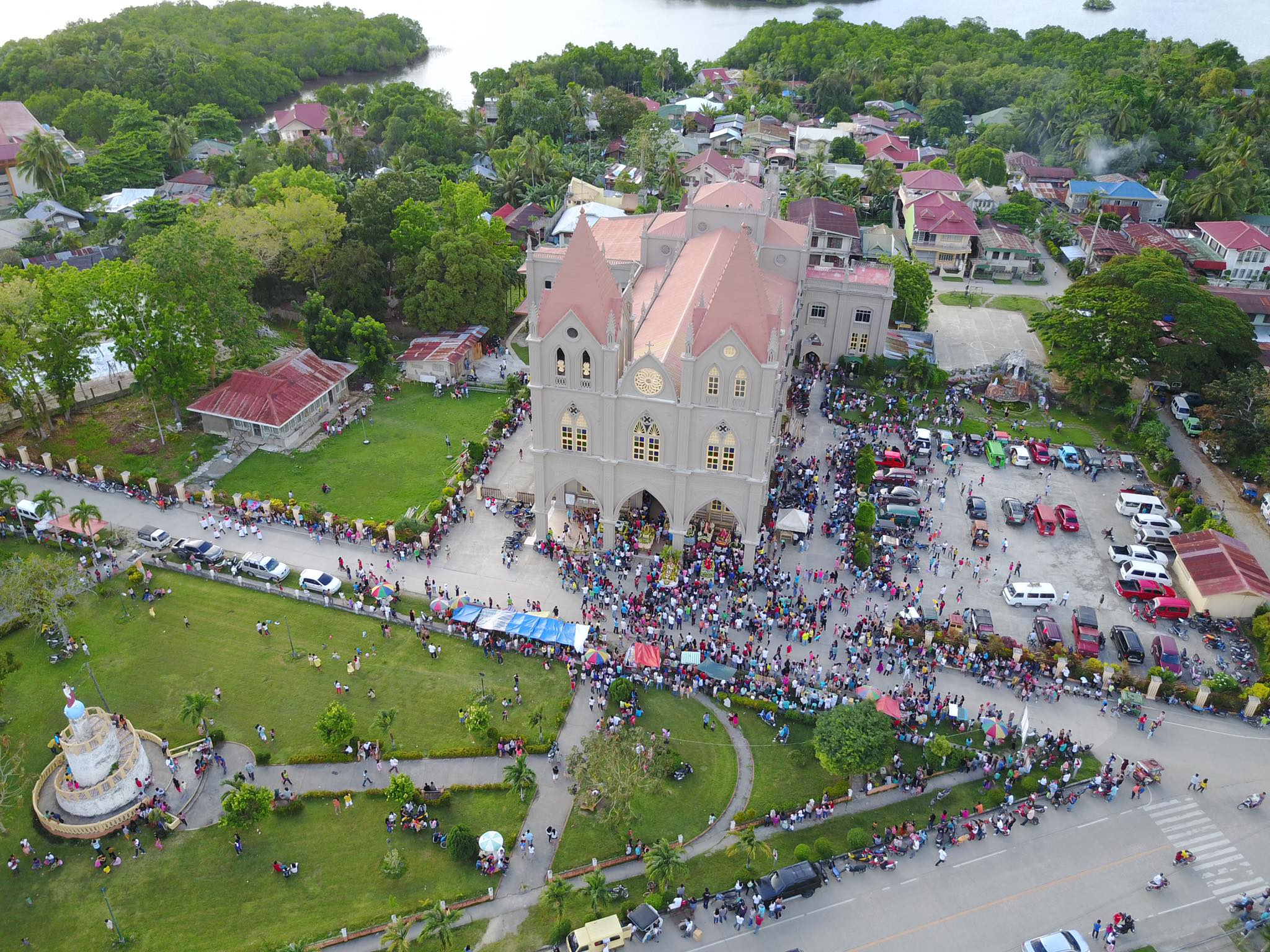
Calape Church

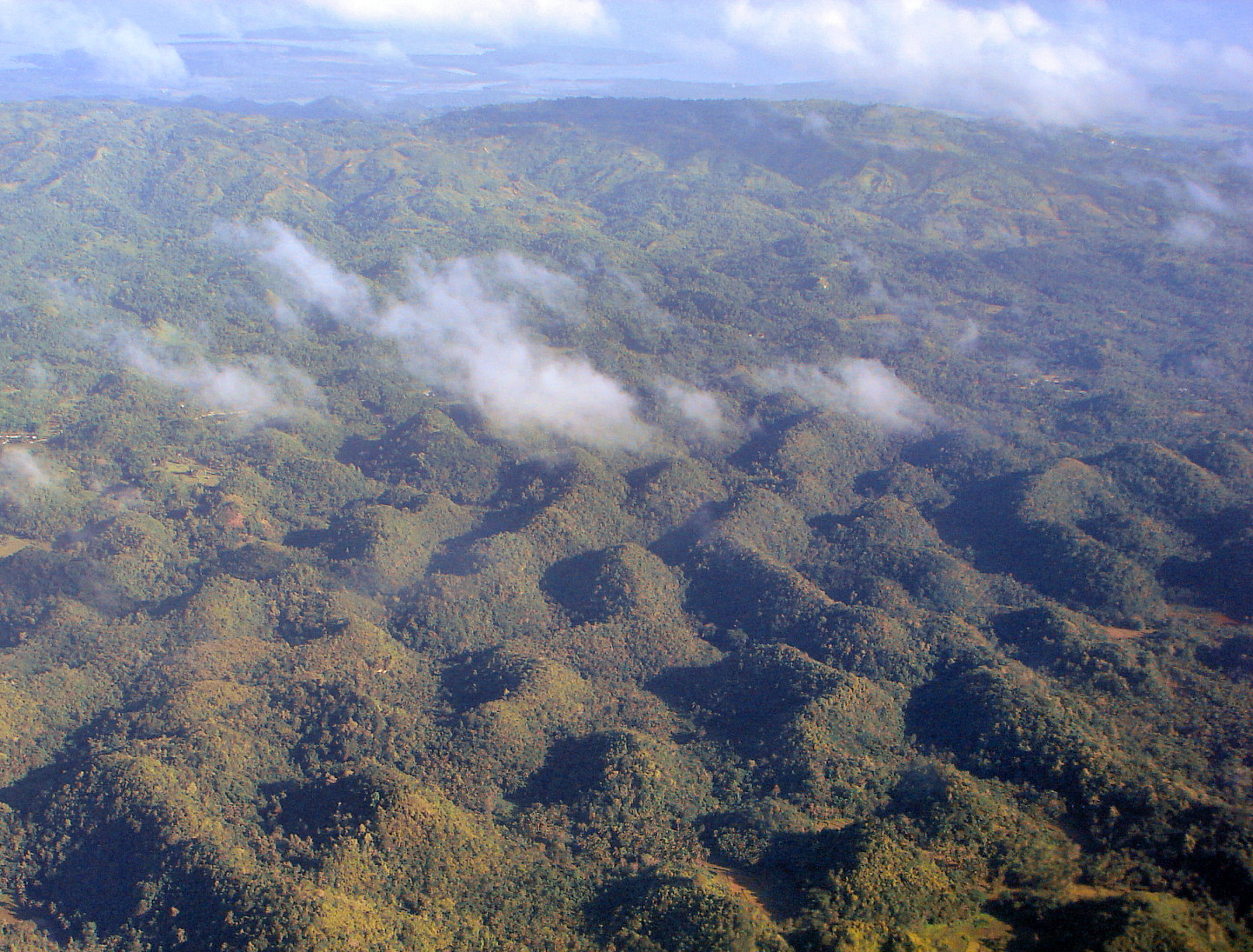
Chocolate Hills at the Bohol interior

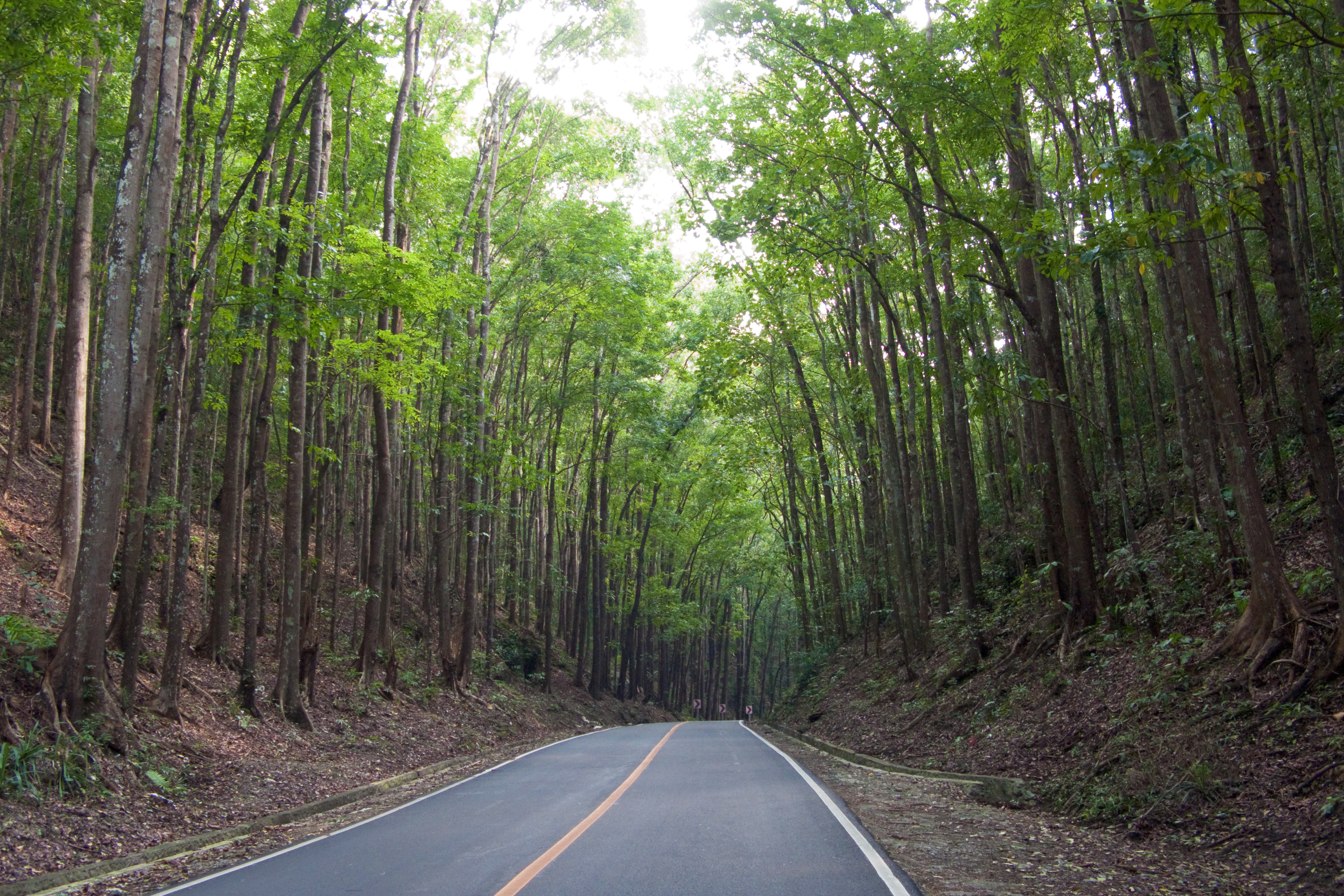
Mahogany forest in Bilar

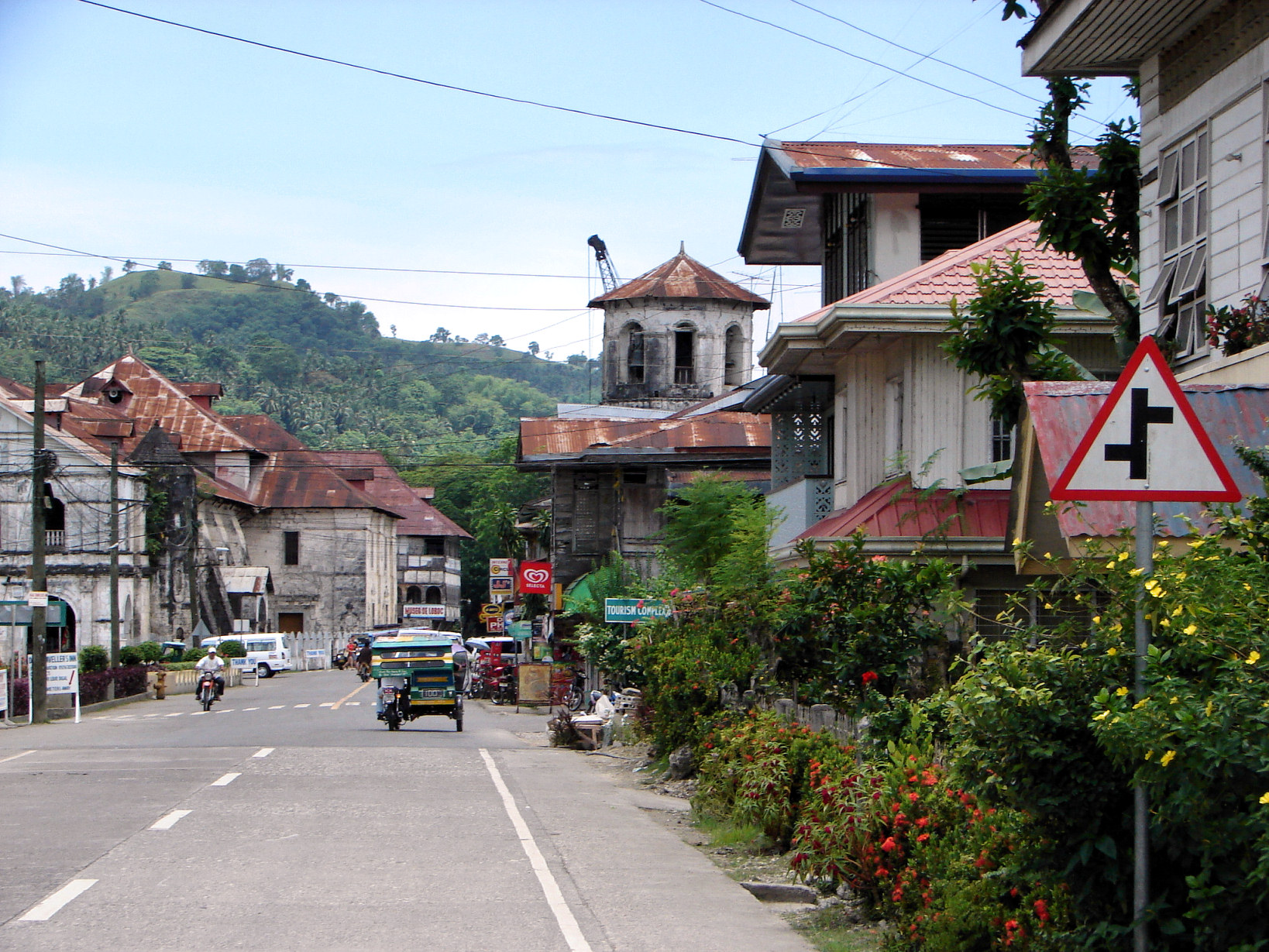
Loboc town proper

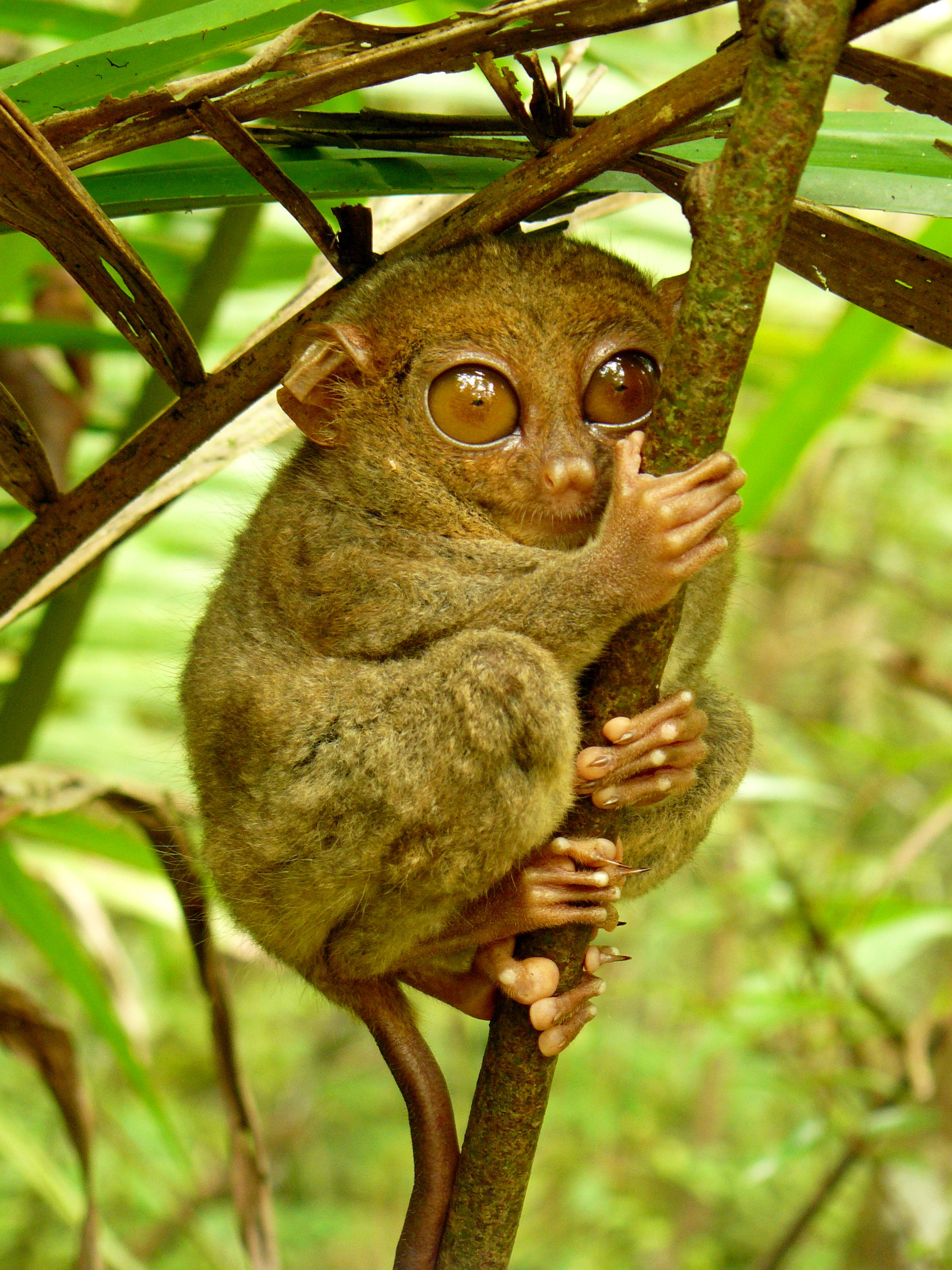
Tarsier

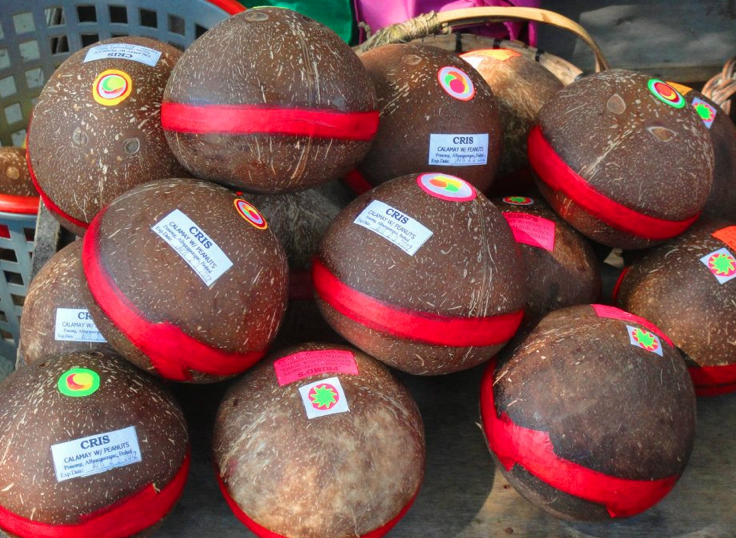
Kalamay delicacy

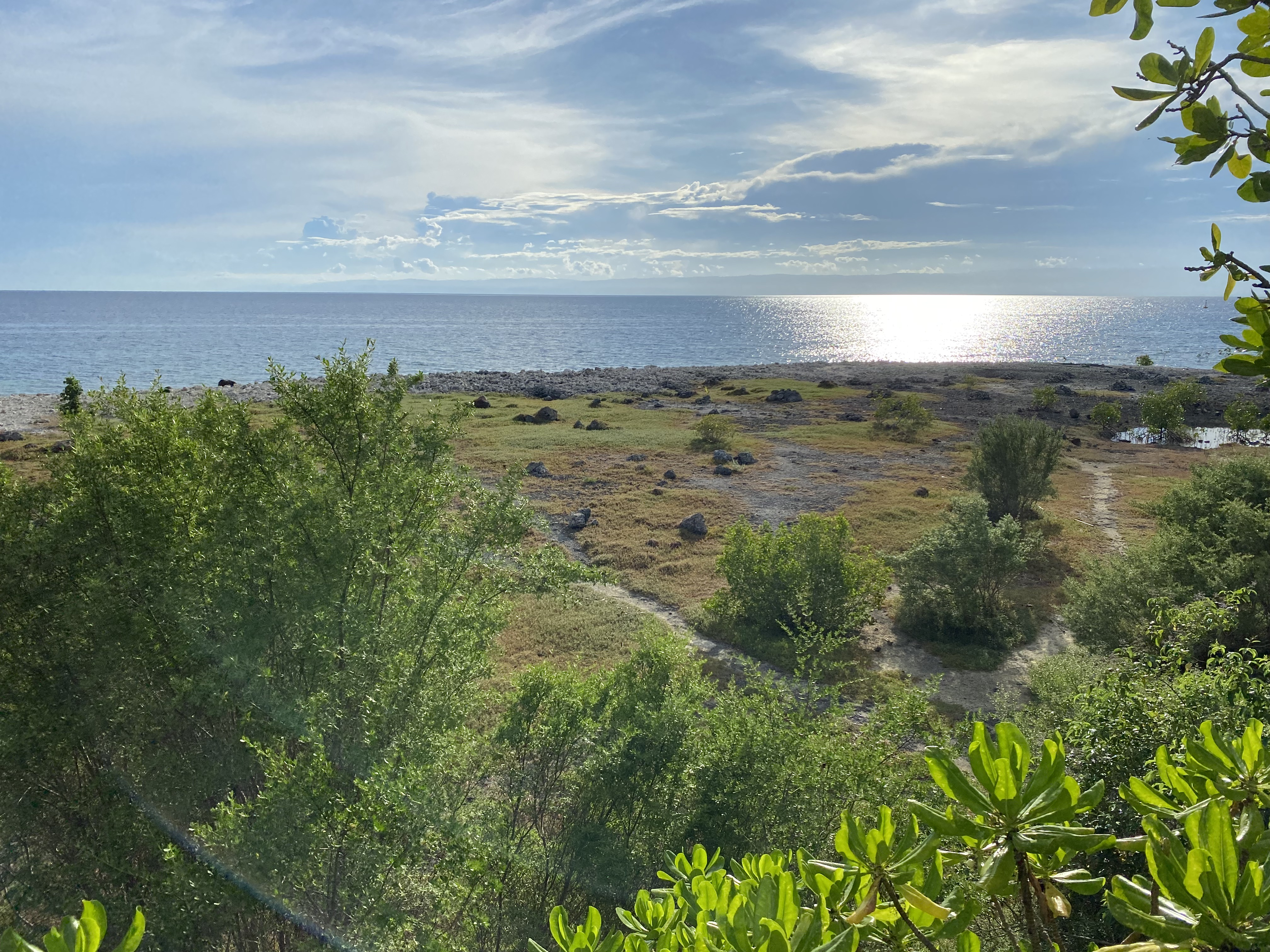
Maribojoc Uplifted Marine Terrace

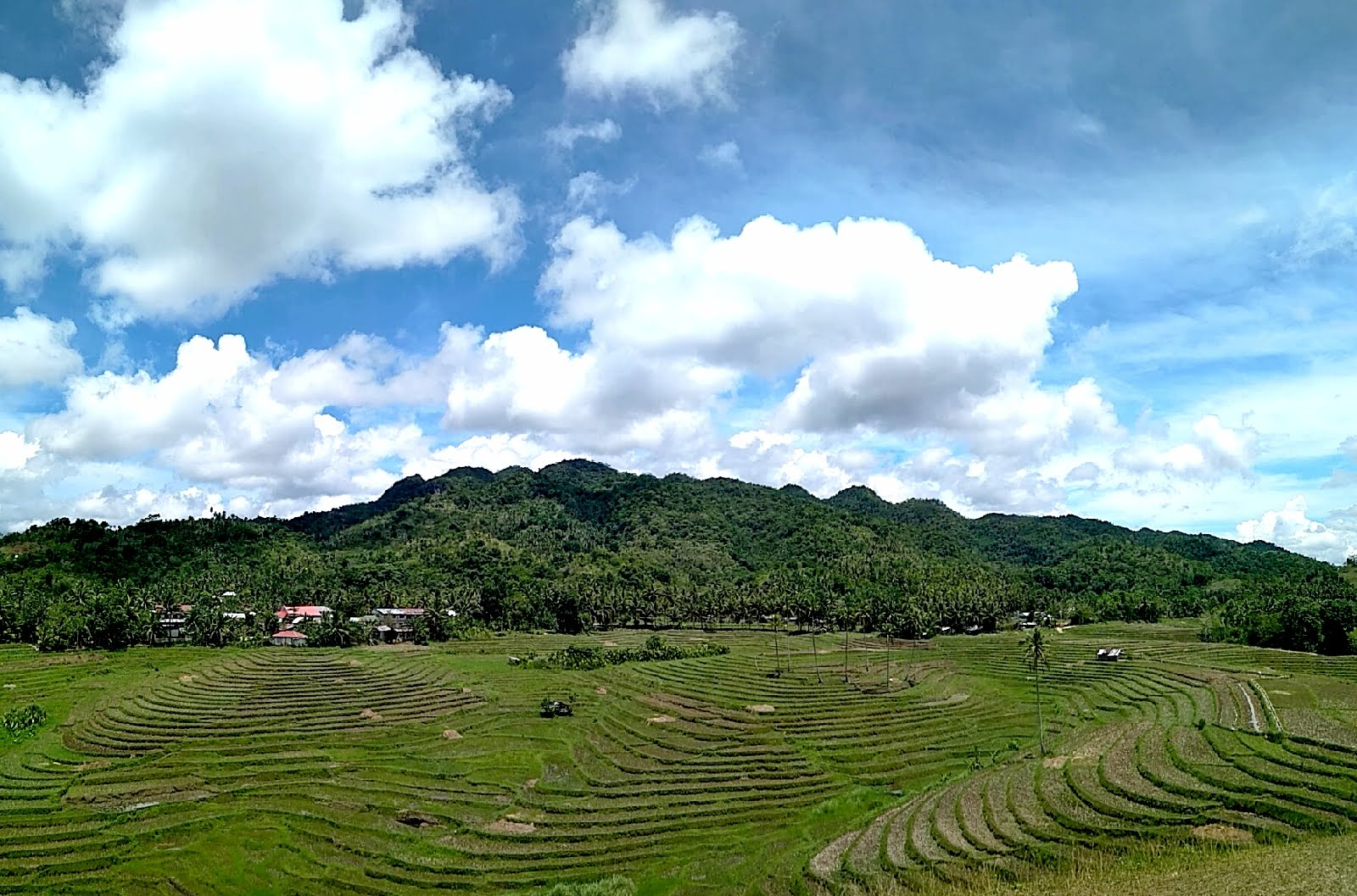
Cadapdapan Rice Terraces

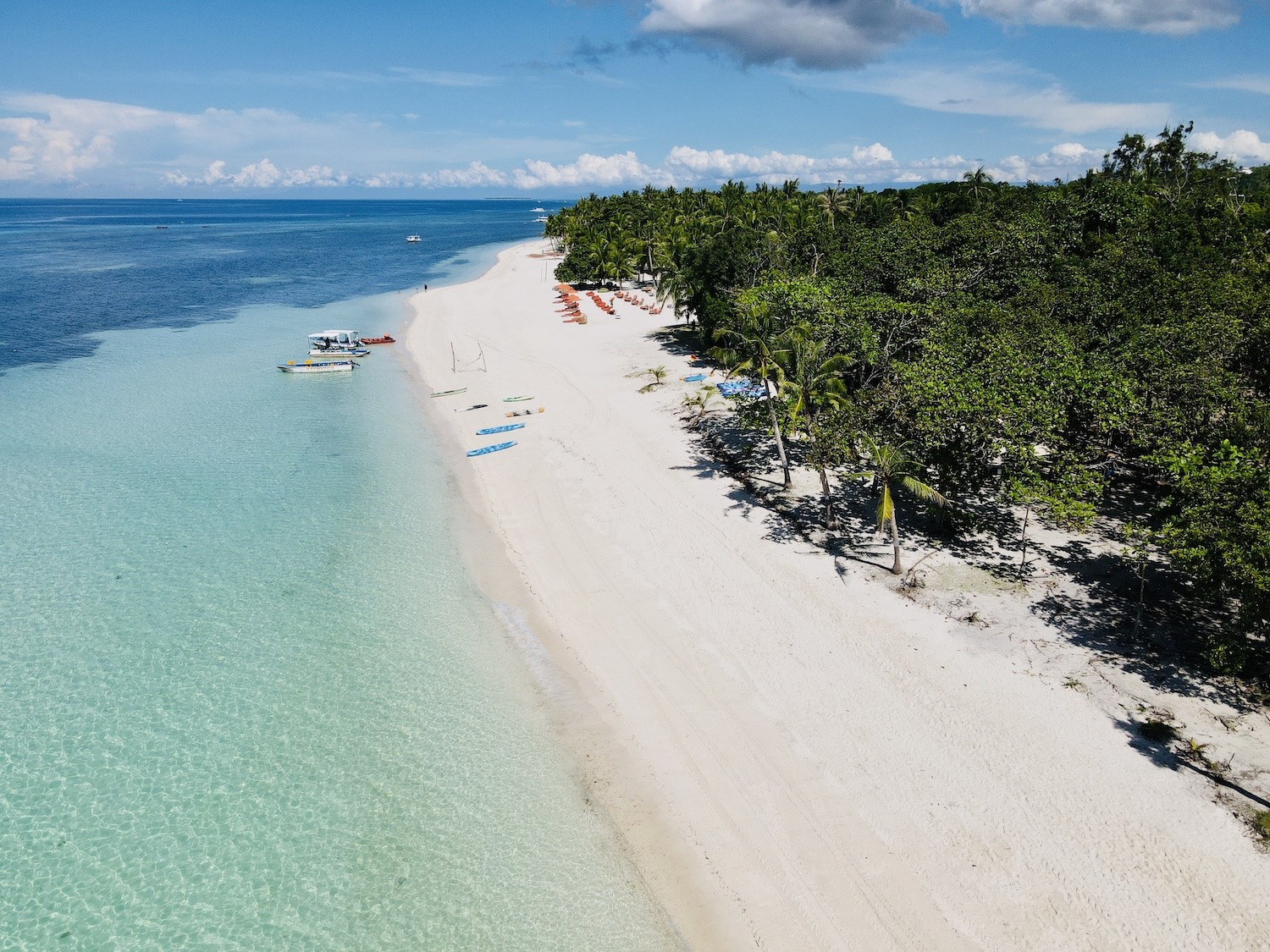
Dumaluan Beach in Panglao Island

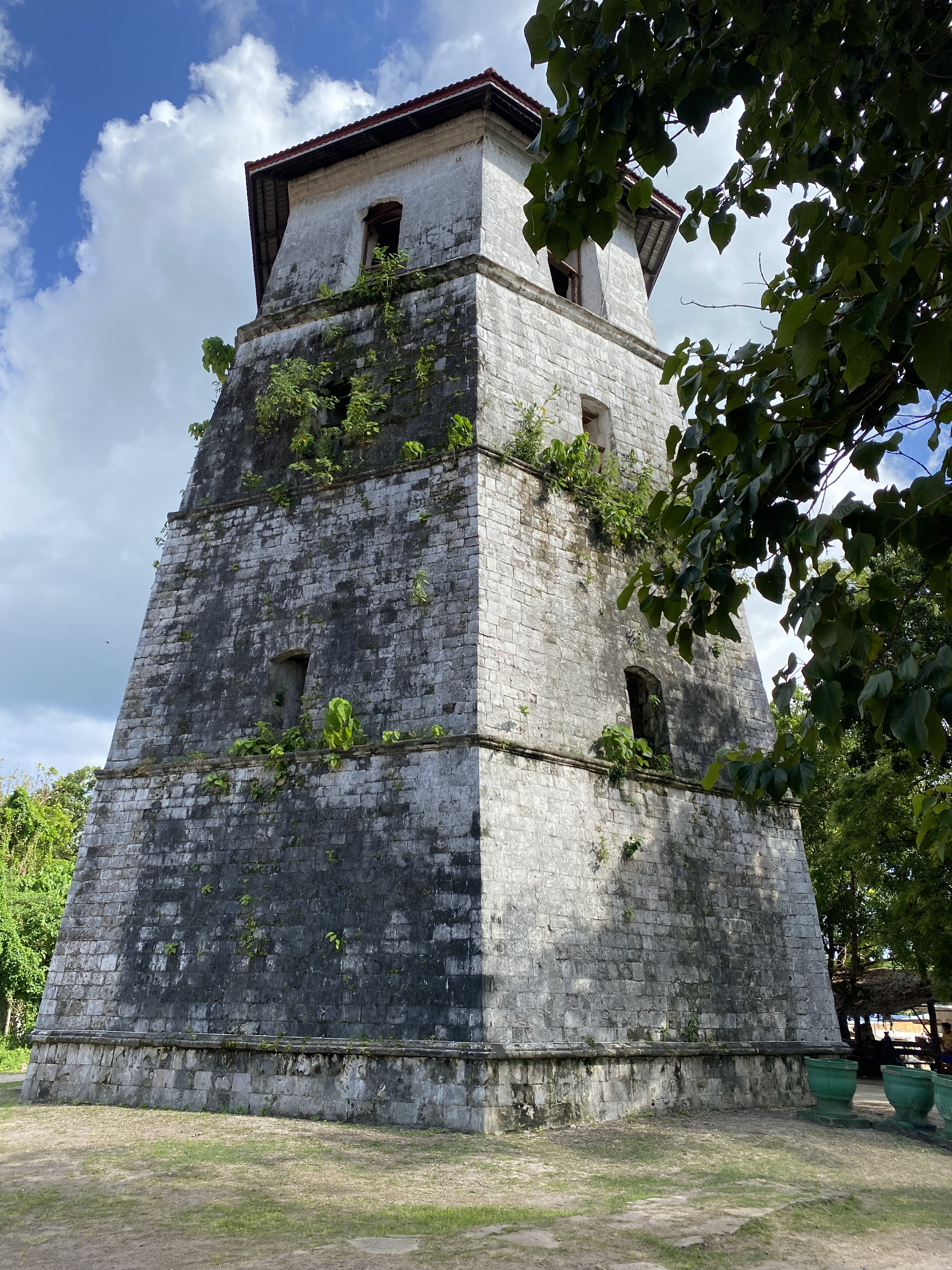
Panglao Watchtower

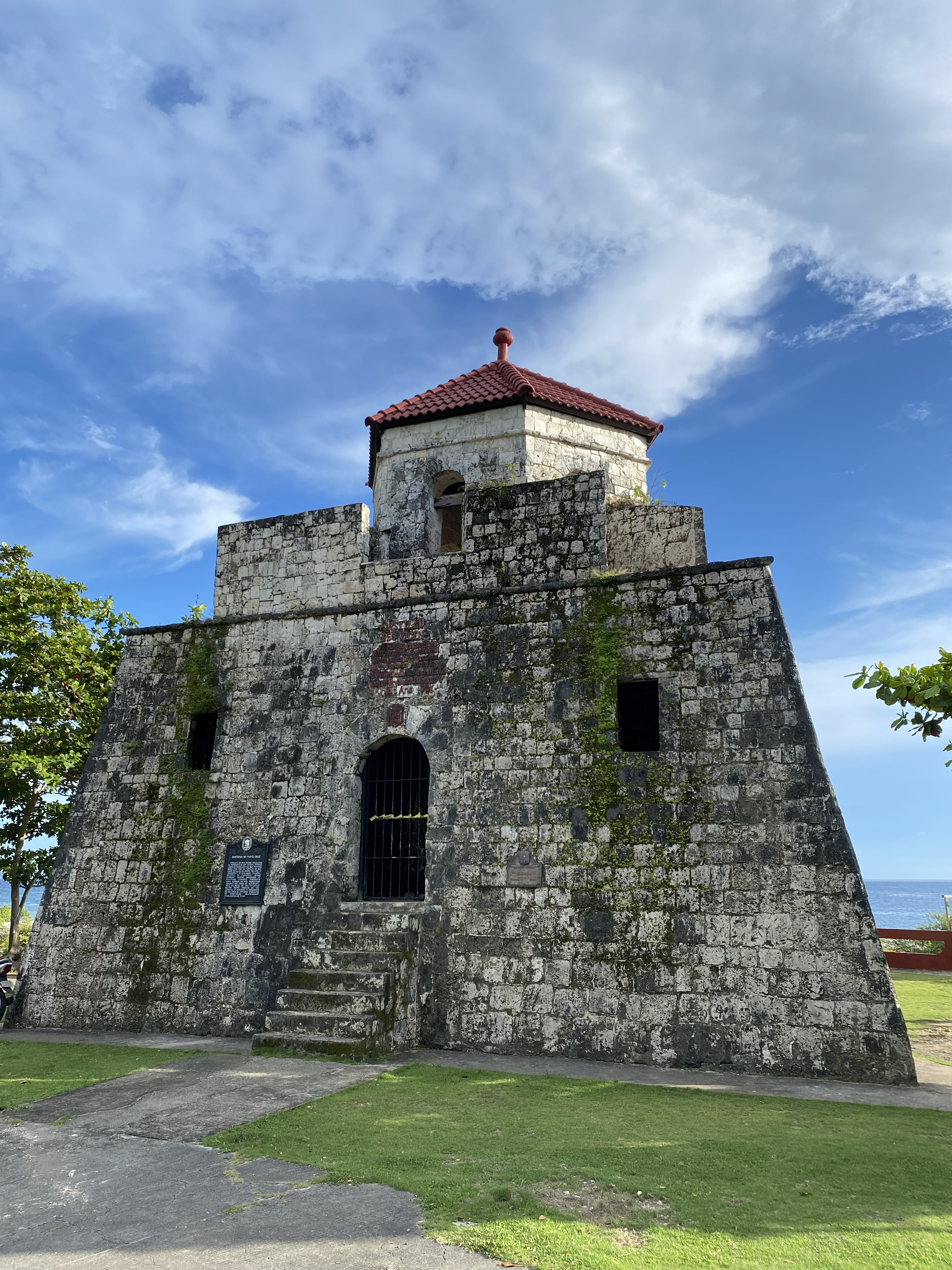
Punta Cruz Watchtower, Maribojoc

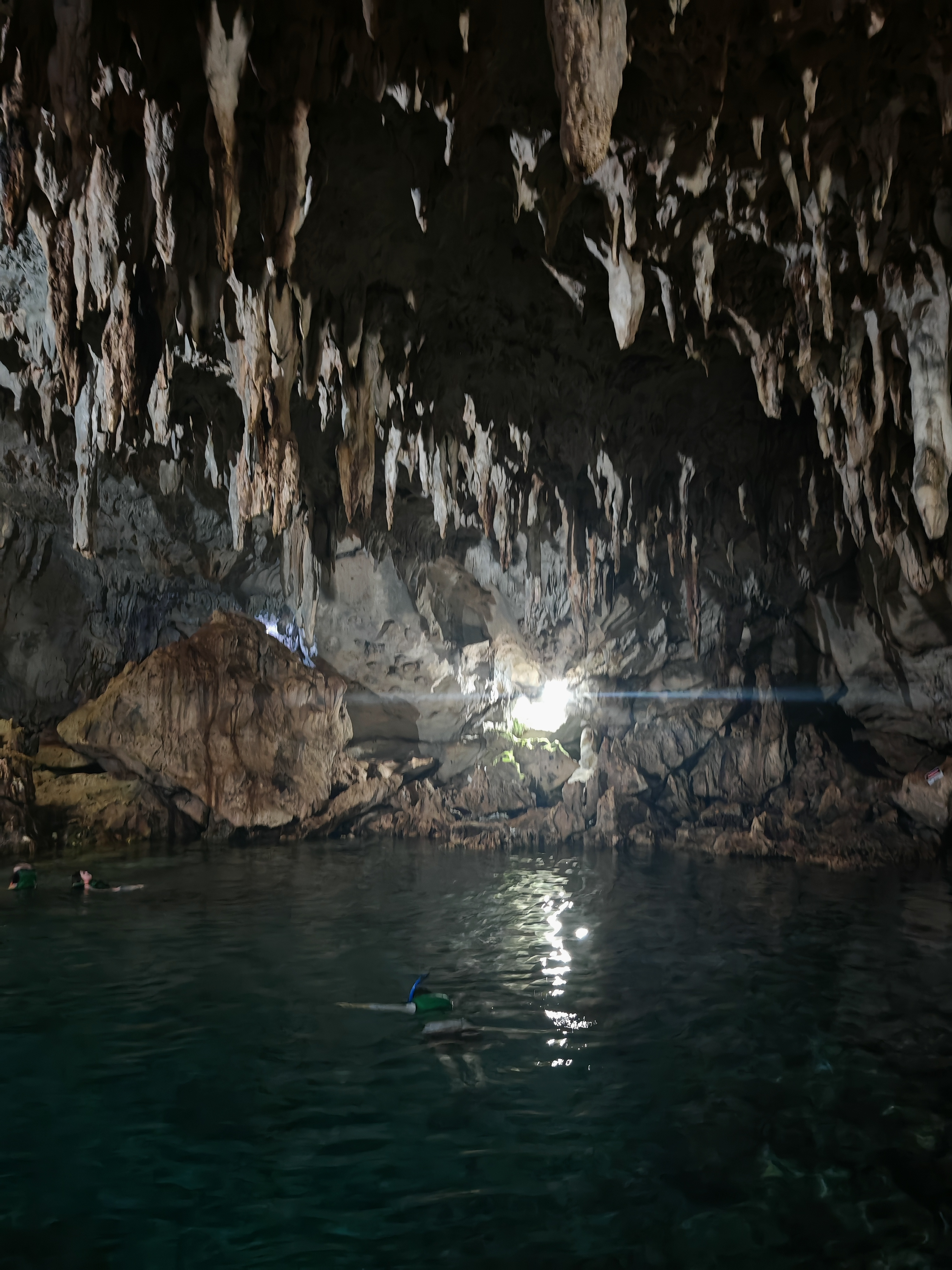
Hinagdanan Cave

== See also ==
- Awit sa Bohol - official hymn of the province of Bohol
- Boholano dialect
- Boholano people
- Diocese of Tagbilaran
- Diocese of Talibon
- Eskaya
- Eskayan language
- List of Bohol Churches
- List of Bohol flora and fauna
- List of Bohol provincial symbols
- List of Bohol-related topics

== Sources ==
- Blair, Emma Helen; Robertson, James Alexander, eds. (1906). The Philippine Islands, 1493–1898. Vol. 40 of 55 (1690–1691). Historical introduction and additional notes by Edward Gaylord Bourne. Cleveland, Ohio: Arthur H. Clark Company. "Explorations by early navigators, descriptions of the islands and their peoples, their history and records of the catholic missions, as related in contemporaneous books and manuscripts, showing the political, economic, commercial and religious conditions of those islands from their earliest relations with European nations to the close of the nineteenth century."
- Bohol Chronicle Daily (April 12, 2017). "9 killed in PNP, AFP-Abu Sayaff clash". Archived from the original on May 9, 2017.
- Cebu Daily News, Victor Anthony V. Silva (April 29, 2017a). "ONE YEAR RECOVERY: ABU SAYYAF in Bohol, the aftermath". Archived from the original on July 5, 2017.
- Cris Evert Lato-Ruffolo; Jose Santino S. Bunachita (May 25, 2017b). "Martial law declaration to affect tourism in Cebu, Bohol". Cebu Daily News. Archived from the original on May 25, 2017.
- Cebu Daily News, Victor Anthony V. Silva (May 7, 2017c). "Bohol to offer 'fiesta package' to tourists". Archived from the original on May 8, 2017.
- EERI, Jes B. Tirol (1990). "Philippine Earthquake" (PDF). EERI Newsletter. 24 (6). EERI. Archived (PDF) from the original on March 8, 2004.
- Foreman, John (1906). The Philippine Islands. A political, geographical, ethnographical, social and commercial history of the Philippine Archipelago and its political dependencies, embracing the whole period of Spanish rule (3rd ed.). New York: Charles Scribner's Sons. OCLC 3567688.
- Gardner, Robert (1997). "Readings From Bohol's History". Bountiful Bohol. Archived from the original on July 1, 2001.
- Hellingman, Jeroen (2002). "Provincial Symbols of Bohol". Bohol.ph. Archived from the original on August 11, 2015.
- Hellingman, Jeroen (2002). "A Short History of Bohol (Part I)". Bohol.ph. Archived from the original on December 20, 2016.
- Hellingman, Jeroen (2002). "A Short History of Bohol (Part II)". Bohol.ph. Archived from the original on March 29, 2016.
- NEDA (2000). "Region VII". Archived from the original on September 19, 2000.
- New York Times, Floyd Whaley (October 14, 2013). "Major Earthquake Strikes Central Philippines". The New York Times. Archived from the original on October 18, 2013.
- Philippine Daily Inquirer, Jeannette I. Andrade (October 15, 2013). "Bohol earthquake strongest to hit Visayas and Mindanao in over 20 years". Archived from the original on October 15, 2013.
- Philippine Daily Inquirer (April 15, 2017). "Security officials: Bohol attack staged by IS-linked extremists". Archived from the original on May 9, 2017.
- Philippine Daily Inquirer, Leo Udtohan (May 12, 2017b). "Soldiers hunting down 2 Abu Sayyaf bandits on island in Bohol". Archived from the original on May 12, 2017.
- Benjie Talisic; Nestle L. Semilla; Victor Anthony V. Silva (May 16, 2017c). "Bohol tourism to go full swing". Philippine Daily Inquirer. Archived from the original on May 17, 2017.
- Rappler, Bea Cupin (May 5, 2017). "Abu Sayyaf member captured in Bohol". Archived from the original on July 5, 2017.
- Sun Star, PNA (May 21, 2017). "Septuagenarian engages Sayyaf bandit in hand-to-hand combat in Bohol". Archived from the original on May 21, 2017.
- Villegas, Ramon N., ed. (2003). Tubod: The Heart of Bohol. National Commission for Culture and the Arts. ISBN 978-971-814-036-9.
- Zaide, Gregorio F. (1949). The Philippines since pre-Spanish times. Vol. I. Philippine Education.
