= Danajon Islet =

Islet in the Philippines

Dawahon Islet
- Location within Visayas, Philippines Location within Philippines

Geography
- Location: Danajon Bank
- Coordinates: 10.2644°N 124.61747°E
- Adjacent to: Camotes Sea; Canigao Channel
- Area: 5 ha (12 acres)
- Highest elevation: 3 m (10 ft)

Administration
- Philippines
- Region: Eastern Visayas
- Province: Leyte
- Municipality: Bato
- Barangay: Dawahon

Demographics
- Population: 3,230

Danajon Islet, also known as Dawahon Islet, is an islet in the Philippines located at the easternmost end of the Danajon Bank. The islet is coterminous with Barangay Dawahon, which is under the jurisdiction of the municipality of Bato in the province of Leyte. The islet is only 5 hectares (12 acres) and has a population of about 3,230 as of the 2020 census. The islet is only 3 meters (9.8 feet) above sea level, but the Danajon Bank protects it somewhat.

== Overview ==
There is an elementary school, a church, two basketball courts, one small road, and a government medical clinic. The high school students are sent to Hingotanan Island, 10 kilometres (6.2 mi) away by boat. There is a weekly ferry service from this islet to the mainland town of Bato, Leyte, which is 24 kilometres (15 mi) away. Other nearby islands include Bilanglangan Island, Gaus Island, and the Caubyan Islets, which are 27 miles (43 km) to the east.

The islet takes its name from the Danajon Bank, the Philippines' only double barrier reef and one of only 6 documented double barrier reefs in the world. A very rare geological formation, it comprises two sets of large coral reefs that formed offshore on a submarine ridge due to a combination of favorable tidal currents and coral growth in the area.

Danajon Bank is home to a vast array of commercially valuable reef fishes, shellfish, crustaceans, and invertebrates such as sea cucumbers and sea urchins. Its extensive seagrass beds are nursery and feeding grounds for various species of rabbitfish (siganids) and seahorses, while its mangroves are spawning habitats for crustaceans, shrimp, and various fish.

== Aquaculture ==
The main and only cash crop for the locals living on the islet is guso (Eucheuma cottonii) which is a seaweed, which is grown in the shallow waters of the Danajon Bank, upon which the islet sits. There are two large 1,000 foot bamboo docks for the drying of the guso before it is sold. The guso is either sold in Cebu or Cagayan de Oro, after it is transported there.

== See also ==
- Camotes Sea — one of the inland seas in the Philippines.
- Danajon Bank — the only double barrier reef of the Philippines.
- Canigao Channel — the strait between the islands of Bohol and Leyte, which connects the Bohol Sea with the Camotes Sea.
- List of islands by population density
