= Hingotanan Island =

Island in Bien Unido, Philippines

Hingotanan Island Pulo sa Hingotanan
- Island/Barangays
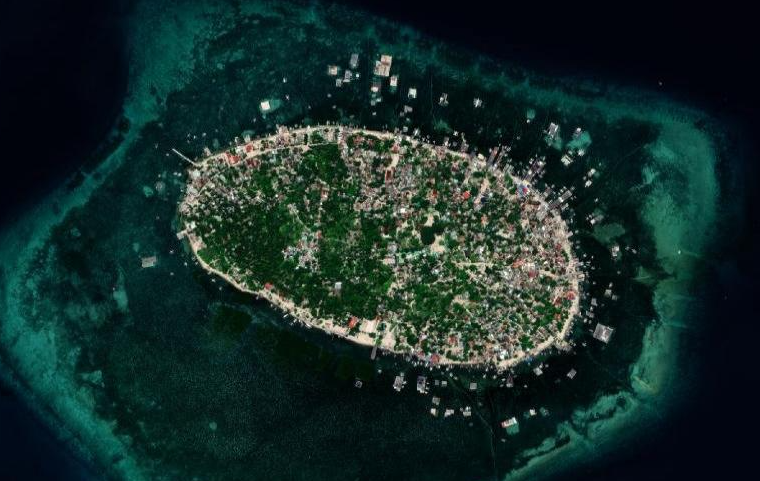
- Hingotanan Island
- Interactive map of Hingotanan Island
- Location of Hingotanan Island within the Philippines Hingotanan Island (Philippines)
- Coordinates: 10°14′33″N 124°29′7″E
- Country: Philippines
- Region: Central Visayas
- Province: Bohol
- Municipality: Bien Unido
- Barangays: Hingotanan West & Hingotanan East
- Joined Bien Unido: April 7, 1981

Government
  - Type: Barangay government
  - Hingotanan East: Punong Barangay: Leodino Paden; SK Chair: Mark Christian Paden
  - East Kagawads: Pedro Garcia; Romulo Avergonzado; Jovencio Paden; Arlene Villamor; Felomino Garcia; Bonifacio Villamor; Jose Marie Paden
  - Hingotanan West: Punong Barangay: Danilo Garcia; SK Chair: Jomar Cresencio
  - West Kagawads: Efren Villamor; Rodulfo Paden; Virgilio Garcia; Leonardo Villamor; Rosendo Garcia; Mario Paden; Mario Paden

Area
  - Total: 32.7 ha (81 acres)
- Elevation: 1.5 m (4.9 ft)
- Highest elevation: 2.0 m (6.6 ft)
- Lowest elevation: 0 m (0 ft)

Population (2024)
  - Total: 3,318
  - Density: 10,100/km^{2} (26,300/sq mi)
- (Total for Barangays Hingotanan East and West)
- Demonym: Hingotananon
- Time zone: UTC+08:00 (PST)
- ZIP Code: 6326
- PSGC: 0701248003 (Hingotanan East) 0701248004 (Hingotanan West)
- IDD : area code: +63 (0)38
- Registered voters: 2,674 (2025)
- Utilities: Electric distribution: BOHECO II; Power generation: NPC-SPUG
- Economy • Poverty incidence30.6% (2023 avg.) • Revenue₱4,035,000 (2023) Native Languages • BoholanoPrimary dialect • CebuanoWidely spoken • TagalogSecondary / L2

Hingotanan Island (Cebuano: Pulo sa Hingotanan; Filipino: Pulo ng Hingotanan) is an island located in the municipality of Bien Unido, in the province of Bohol, Philippines. The island consists of two barangays, which are Hingotanan West, and Hingotanan East. It is situated in the Camotes Sea and Danajon Bank. Its total land area is 32.7 hectares (81 acres). According to the 2024 Census, Hingotanan Island has a population of 3,318 people with the population of Hingotanan West and East combined. Hingotanan East is classified as a rural barangay.

== Etymology ==
Hingotanan Island was named by early pioneers from Cebu. They named it after the utan (or vegetables) there, such as malunggay, which is a species of flowering trees. The pioneers were fond of planting malunggay when they settled there.

== History ==
=== Precolonial era ===
In the precolonial era of the Philippines, Hingotanan Island was inhabited by early Boholanos. The community was organized into multiple barangays, that were led by a Datu. Balangay vessels were used by residents to navigate the channels of Northern Bohol. The residents participated in an exchange network, where local marine resources and artisanal goods were traded with neighboring islands and foreign merchants from places such as the Song and Yuan Dynasty. Animism was practiced, with babaylans performing rituals to please spirits of the sea and land, to ensure successful harvests, and safe voyages.

=== Administrative history ===
Hingotanan Island was split into two barangays in the Late 1970's after its population went over 5,000 people with approximately 500 households. The change was proposed by the late Mr. Apronianao Paden, who used to be the sitting municipal councilor of Bien Unido. used to be under the jurisdiction of the municipality of Talibon, before being included in the territory to create Bien Unido through Batas Pambansa Blg. 93 on December 24, 1980. (Note: In addition, then assembly men Bartolome Cabangbang and Eutiquio Cimafranca pushed Batas Pambansa Blg. 93.) On April 7, 1981, the change was ratified through Proclamation No. 2068. As of 2026, the island is separated into two barangays, which are Hingotanan West and East.

=== Seaweed boom ===
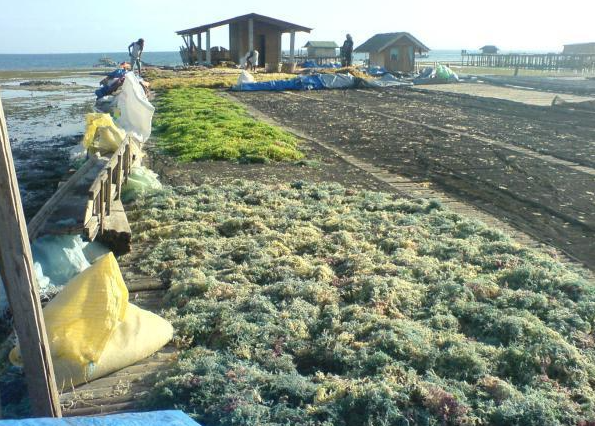
Seaweed farming and drying on the coast of Hingotanan Island

For decades, locals on Hingotanan Island used to rely on subsistence fishing, but by the late 1970s and early 1980s, people shifted to seaweed farming. People started farming seaweed because it was discovered to have several uses, such as stabilizer for toothpaste; shampoo, cosmetic creams, ice cream, milk shakes, shoe polish gel, thickener for fire-fighting foam, etc. This product led to an unprecedented demand from industrial places, such as Japan, the United States, and Europe. Cottonii and spinosum are the types of seaweed mostly cultivated on Hingotanan Island.

In 1991, approximately three thousand residents farmed seaweed, providing them with a higher standard of living than local fishers. In 2010, a team led by the Southern Philippines Agri-Business and Marine and Aquatic School of Technology inspected the Hingotanan Seaweed Farm, which then employed three thousand coastal farmers operating 3,000 hectares (7,400 acres) of seaweed farms, growing mainly Eucheuma spinosum for production of carrageenan.

== Geography ==
=== Location ===
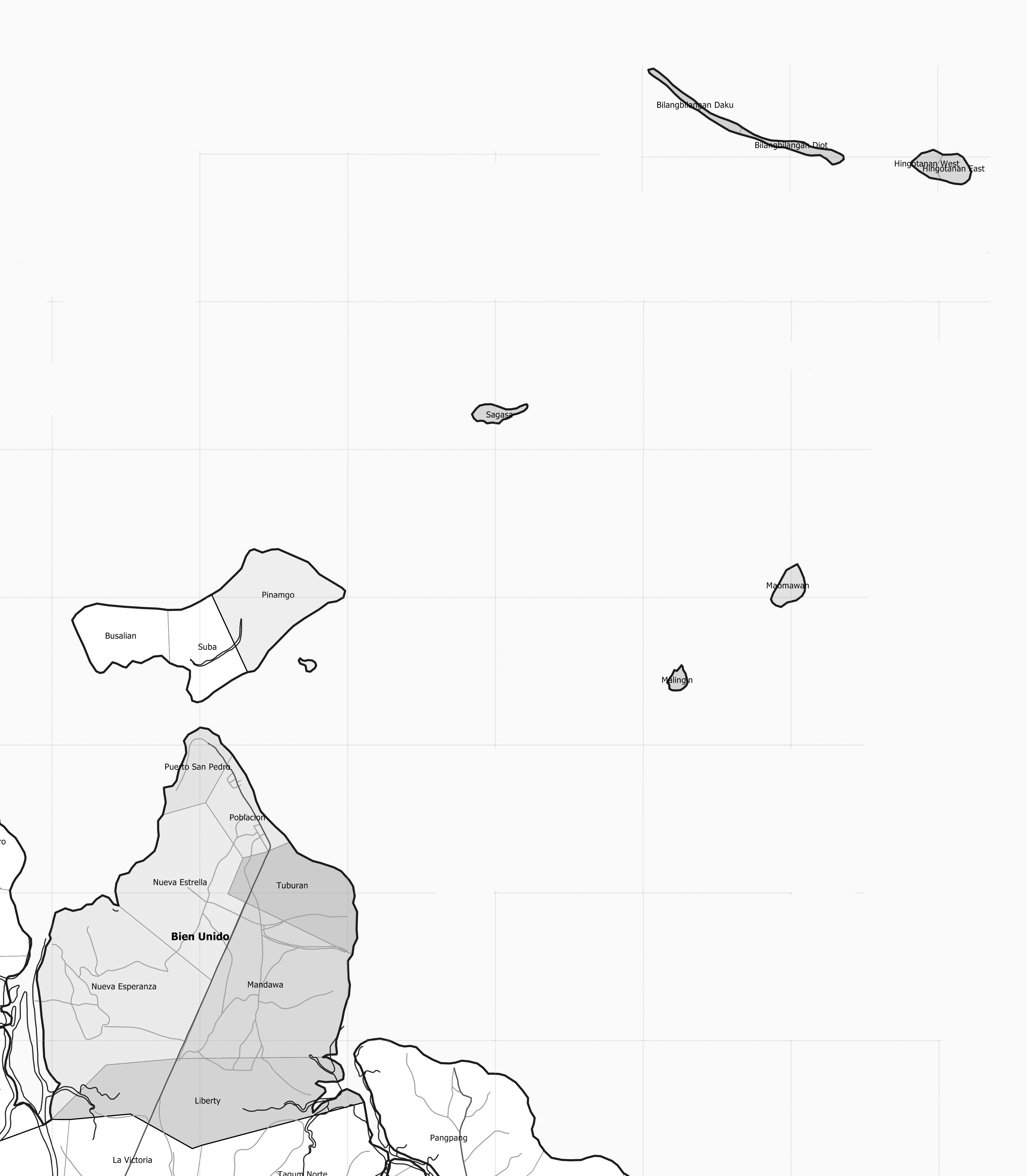
Map of the municipality of Bien Unido, with Hingotanan being the easternmost island, right of Bilang-Bilangan Island (Bien Unido, Bohol).

Hingotanan Island is a low-lying island in the region of Central Visayas in the Philippines. It lies in the Camotes Sea and Danajon Bank, which is within the Camotes Sea. It is approximately 12 kilometers (7.5 mi) away from the mainland of Bohol. Hingotanan Island is part of the municipality of Bien Unido.

=== Physical features ===
The land area of Hingotanan Island is 32.7 hectares (81 acres). The island's terrain primarily consists of coralline limestone, and the maximum elevation reaches 2.0 meters (6.6 ft) above sea level. The coastline is characterized by clear tropical waters, coconut mangroves, coral reefs, and seagrass beds.

=== Barangays ===
Hingotanan Island is divided into two barangays. Each barangay consists of puroks and some have sitios.

As of 2026, only Hingotanan East is classified as a rural barangay.

- Hingotanan West
- Hingotanan East

=== Climate ===
Climate data for Hingotanan Island, Bien Unido, Bohol
Month	Jan	Feb	Mar	Apr	May	Jun	Jul	Aug	Sep	Oct	Nov	Dec	Year
Mean daily maximum °C (°F)	27.2 (81.0)	27.2 (81.0)	27.8 (82.0)	28.3 (82.9)	28.9 (84.0)	28.9 (84.0)	28.3 (82.9)	28.9 (84.0)	28.3 (82.9)	28.3 (82.9)	28.3 (82.9)	27.8 (82.0)	28.2 (82.7)
Mean daily minimum °C (°F)	25.6 (78.1)	25.6 (78.1)	26.1 (79.0)	26.7 (80.1)	27.2 (81.0)	26.7 (80.1)	26.7 (80.1)	26.7 (80.1)	26.7 (80.1)	26.7 (80.1)	26.7 (80.1)	26.1 (79.0)	26.5 (79.7)
Average precipitation mm (inches)	175.26 (6.90)	119.38 (4.70)	88.9 (3.50)	76.2 (3.00)	121.92 (4.80)	180.34 (7.10)	208.28 (8.20)	165.1 (6.50)	190.5 (7.50)	238.76 (9.40)	195.58 (7.70)	187.96 (7.40)	1,948.18 (76.7)
Average rainy days	24.8	19.2	20.4	18.5	24.3	27.2	27.0	25.2	26.6	28.7	26.5	26.8	295.2
Source: Meteoblue

== Demographics ==
Population of Hingotanan Island
Year	Pop.	±% p.a.
2000	3,156	—
2007	3,445	+1.22%
2010	3,948	+5.08%
2015	4,129	+0.86%
2020	3,654	−2.54%
2024	3,318	−2.29%
Philippine Statistics Authority

== Health and social services ==
- Number of Barangay Health Stations: 2

== Education ==
Secondary and High schools:

- Hingotanan National High School

Elementary schools:

- Hingotanan Elementary School

Hingotanan East National High School was granted computers in 2005, which required them to purchase additional diesel-electric generators and schedule classes and administrative tasks around power allocation. In late 2020, in a pilot project for the region, solar power systems were installed.

== See also ==
- Bien Unido
- Bohol
- Central Visayas
- Philippines
