= Pandanon Island =

Philippine island of Bohol

Isla sa Pandanon
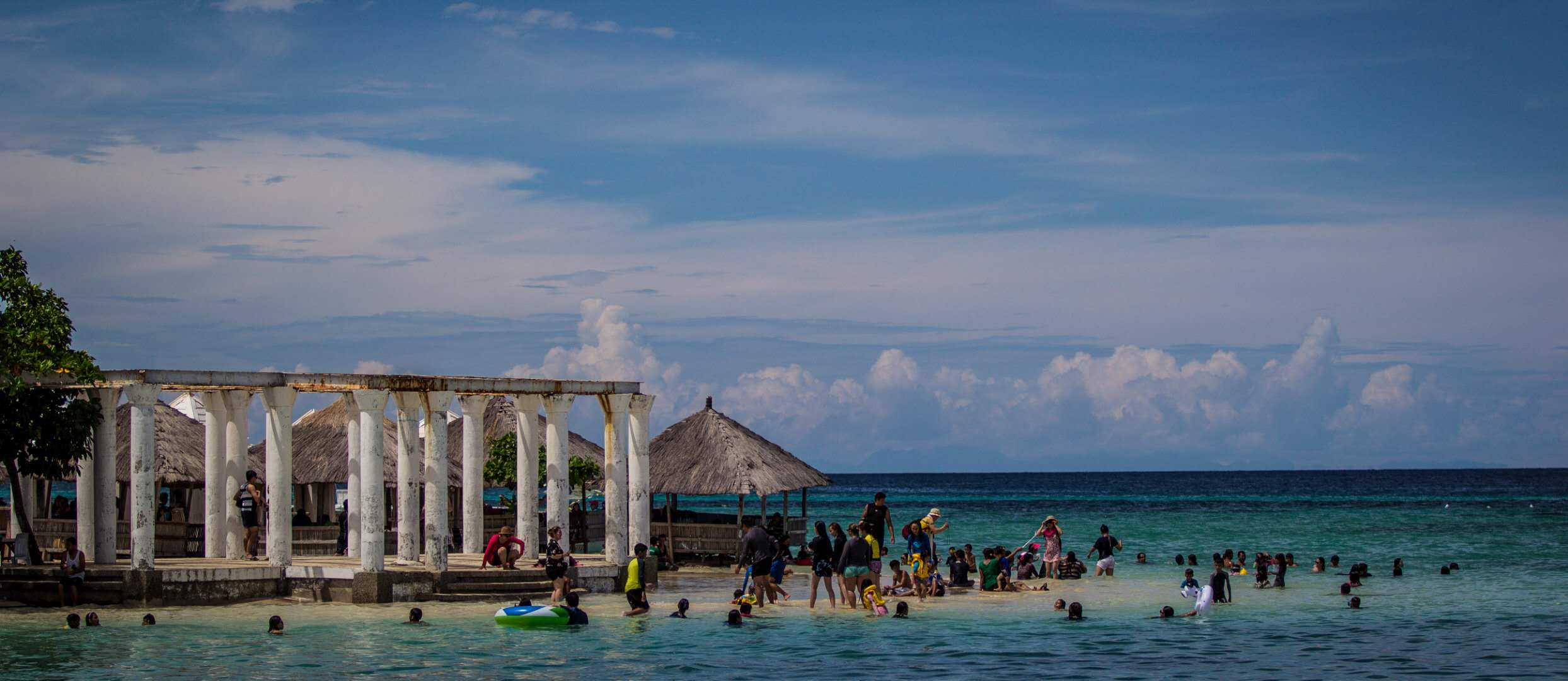
- A view of the beach in Pandanon Island

- Location within Visayas, Philippines Location within Philippines

Geography
- Coordinates: 10°10′48″N 124°5′6″E
- Adjacent to: Camotes Sea
- Area: 0.07 km^{2} (0.027 sq mi)

Administration
- Philippines
- Region: Central Visayas
- Province: Bohol
- Municipality: Getafe

Demographics
- Population: 2,306 (2024)
- Pop. density: 32,942/km^{2} (85319/sq mi)
- Ethnic groups: Cebuano

Pandanon is an island located in the Camotes Sea, in between the islands of Olango and Bohol, in the Visayas Region, Philippines. The island is locally administered by Barangay Pandanon, municipality of Getafe, Bohol. Pandanon is situated in the Danajon Bank, the only double barrier reef in the country and famous for its rich marine wildlife and diversity. It is 9 km (5.6 mi) northwest of the port of Getafe and 13 km (8.1 mi) southeast of Cordova, Cebu. While most of the residents in the island engage in fishing, some are employed in the tourism sector, working in the beach resorts of the island and provide island hopping tours for travelers. In the 2024 Census, the population of Pandanon is 2,306. With a very small area of only 0.07 km^{2} (0.027 sq mi), the island is regarded as having a very high population density.

== Education ==
Pandanon has two public schools.

- Pandanon Elementary School
- Pandanon High School

== Recent disasters ==
The island of Pandanon was badly affected by Typhoon Rai or known in the Philippines as Super Typhoon Odette. Before the storm arrived, residents were evacuated to emergency shelters in the main island. In its aftermath, many families lost their homes and fishing boats were destroyed. In response, the local government, the Philippine Coast Guard and the Philippine Army provided relief goods to affected families in the island.

== Gallery ==
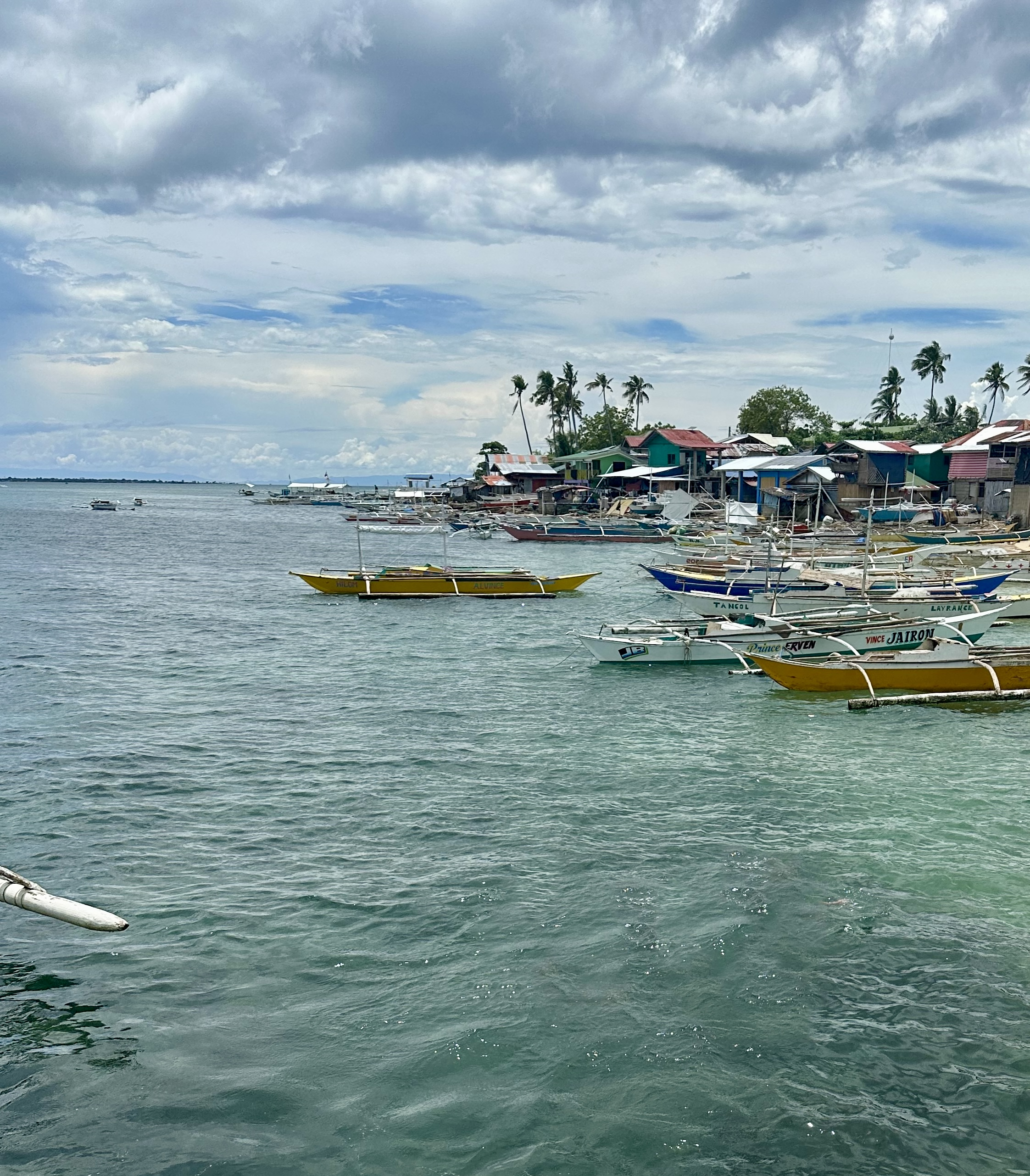

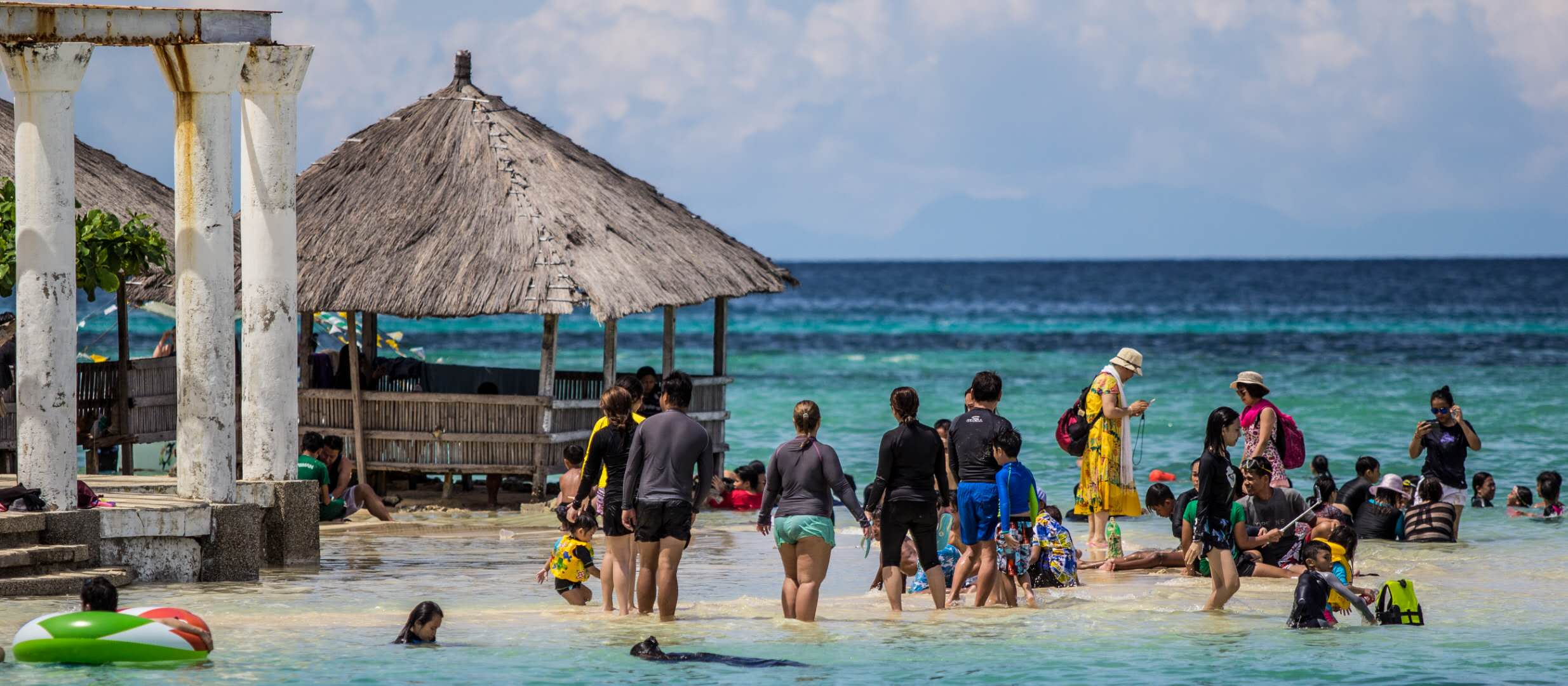

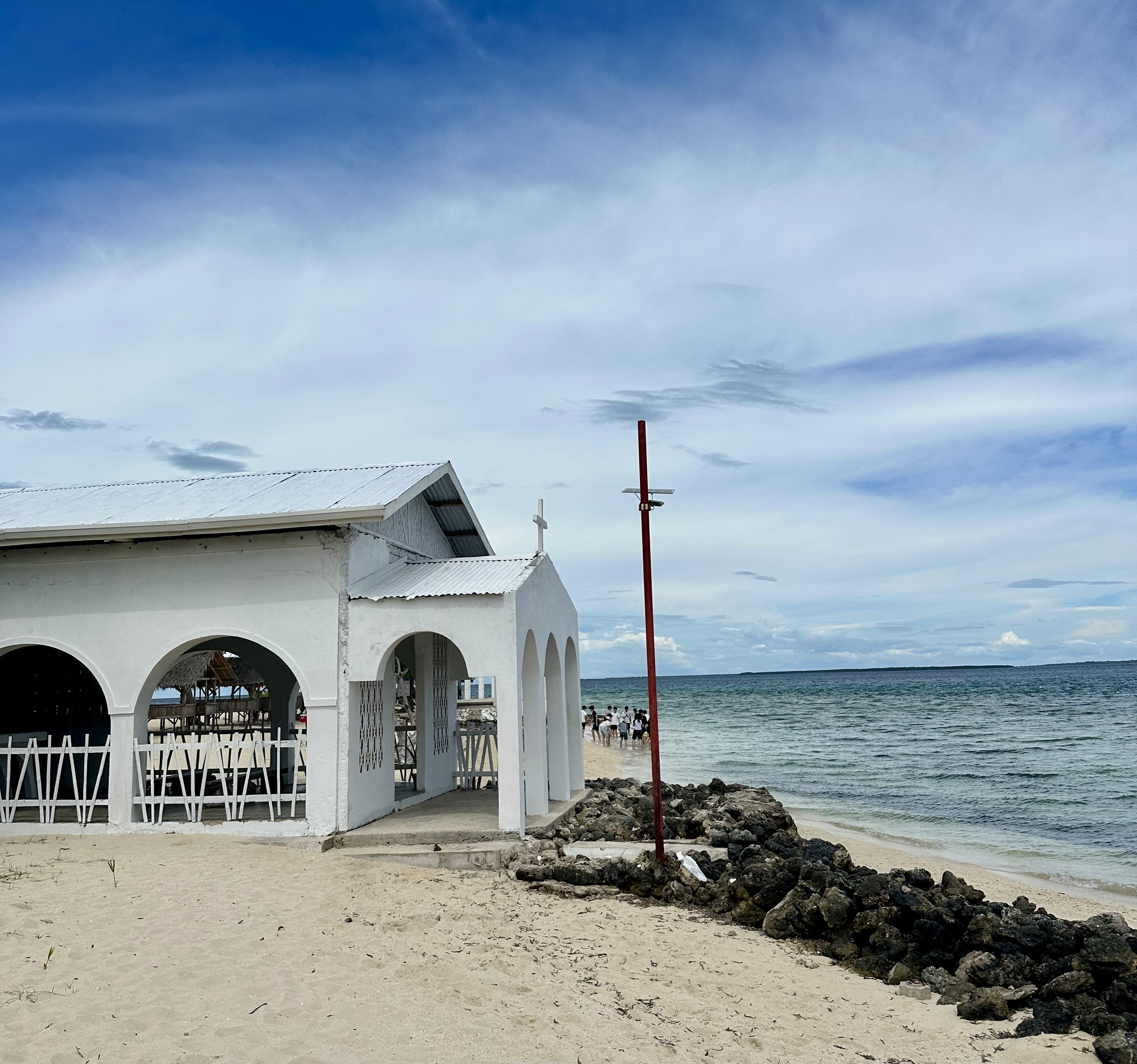

== See also ==
- List of islands by population density
