= Nasingin Island =

Island in the Philippines

Isla sa Nasingin
- Location within Visayas, Philippines Location within Philippines

Geography
- Location: Danajon Bank
- Coordinates: 10.1801°N 124.1354°E
- Adjacent to: Camotes Sea
- Area: 0.04 km^{2} (0.015 sq mi)
- Highest elevation: 3 m (10 ft)

Administration
- Philippines
- Region: Central Visayas
- Province: Bohol
- Municipality: Getafe

Demographics
- Population: 2,105 (2024)
- Pop. density: 52,875/km^{2} (136946/sq mi)
- Ethnic groups: Cebuano

Nasingin Island is an extremely densely populated island in Getafe, Bohol, Philippines. The island takes up 0.04 km^{2}, and has a population of 2,105. This leaves it with a population density of 52,625 people per km^{2}. The small island is sustained by fishing. Strong typhoons hit the island often. The island is 1.16 km long.

The island is approximately 3 km (1.9 mi) from the port in Getafe and around 21 km (13 mi) southeast from Cordova, Cebu. Nasingin lies in the Danajon Bank, the only double barrier reef in the country.

A 250-hectares of mangrove forest is located at the northwest side of the island. Launched in 2013, the planting of mangroves in Nasingin is part of the National Greening Program of the Department of Environment and Natural Resources. The mangrove forest is being managed by the Nasingin Fisherfolks and Mangrove Planters Association.

Nasingin has one public elementary school, Nasingin Elementary School.

== See also ==
- List of islands by population density
