= Caubian Islands =

Group of islands in Visayas, Philippines

Mga isla sa Caubian
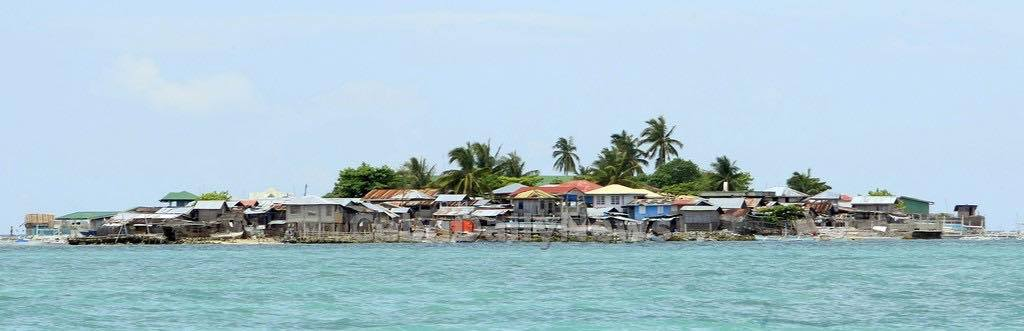
- Caubian Gamay Island

- Location within Visayas, Philippines Location within Philippines

Geography
- Coordinates: 10°16′38″N 124°10′8″E
- Archipelago: Philippine
- Adjacent to: Camotes Sea

Administration
- Philippines
- Region: Central Visayas
- City: Lapu-Lapu
- Barangay: Caubian

Demographics
- Population: 2,273 (2024)
- Ethnic groups: Cebuano

Caubian Islands is a group of islands of Lapu-Lapu City, Philippines. Located in the Camotes Sea, it is approximately 13 kilometers (8.1 mi) north from Getafe, Bohol, and 15 kilometers (9.3 mi) east from Mactan Island. The group consists of two small islands: the bigger uninhabited Caubian Daku, also called Poo, and the smaller but densely populated Caubian Gamay. Both islands are located in the Danajon Bank, the only double barrier reef in the Philippines and known to be one of the richest fishing grounds in the country. It is part of the Olango Island Group. Most of the families depend on fishing and speak the Cebuano language. According to the 2024 census, the islands has a population of 2,273. With an area of around 0.04km^{2}, Caubian Gamay has an estimated population density of 56,825/km^{2}. It is regarded to be one of the densest populated islands in the world.

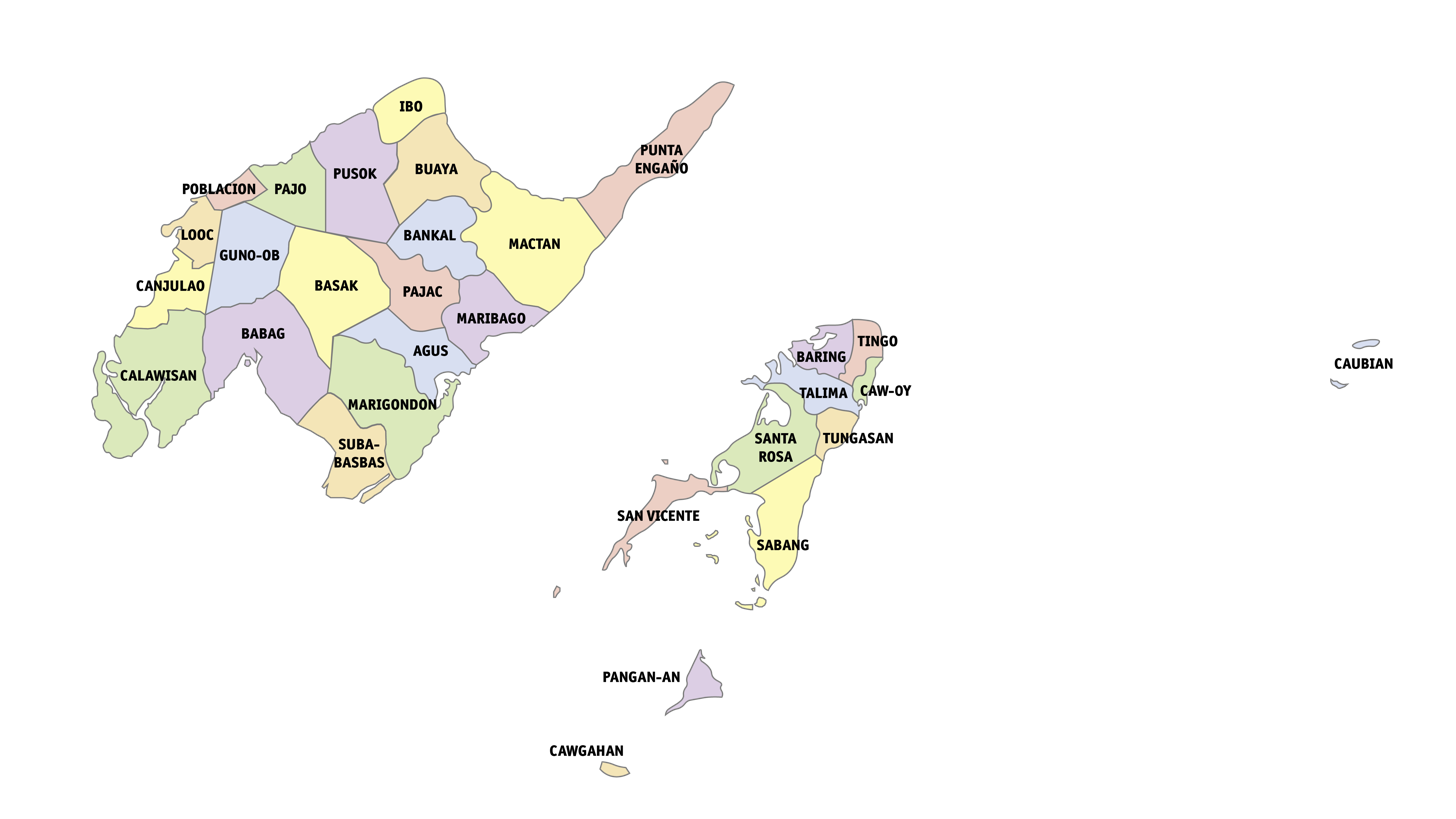
Map of Lapu-Lapu City. Barangay Caubian is located at the rightmost part.

== Facilities ==
Currently, the islands has an elementary and high school as well as a basketball court. Grade 7 to 12 students have to travel to the nearest high school in Olango Island. As of 2021, the barangay has no permanent barangay hall, daycare center and health center. The local officials are temporarily using a facility owned by a foundation where they do meetings and attend to their constituents. The barangay can be reached by motorized bangka through Angasil Port in Mactan or Sta. Rosa Port in Olango.

== Natural Hazards ==
Caubian is exposed to hazards such as strong typhoons and sea level rise, which is believed to be caused by climate change. On December 16, 2021, the residents of Caubian were evacuated to Mactan before the arrival of the Category 5 tropical cyclone, Typhoon Rai, or known in the Philippines as Super Typhoon Odette. In its aftermath, a number of houses and infrastructure were damaged and affected families were given immediate relief aid by the local government and non-government organizations. The residents of the islands get their portable water supply from Mactan and Olango, transporting to the islands by boat. With the El Niño forecasted to intensity starting in October, 2023, the Disaster Risk Reduction and Management Office of the city of Lapu-Lapu City is monitoring that people in Caubian can still have access to fresh water.

== See also ==
- List of islands by population density
