= Calituban Island =

Island in the Philippines

Isla sa Calituban
- Location within Visayas

Geography
- Coordinates: 10°14′36″N 124°17′43″E
- Archipelago: Philippine
- Adjacent to: Camotes Sea
- Area: 0.15 km^{2} (0.058 sq mi)

Administration
- Philippines
- Region: Central Visayas
- Province: Bohol
- Municipality: Talibon
- Barangay: Calituban

Demographics
- Population: 3,569 (2024)
- Pop. density: 23,793/km^{2} (61624/sq mi)
- Ethnic groups: Cebuano

Calituban is an island off the coast of northern Bohol island, Philippines. It is located approximately 11 km (6.8 mi) north-northwast from the port of Talibon. Situated in the Camotes Sea, Calitiban Island is one of the islands in the Danajon Bank, the only double barrier reef in the country, known for its rich marine biodiversity. The whole island is locally governed by Barangay Calituban under the administration of the municipality of Talibon, Bohol. The residents of the island are mostly engaged in fishing, while some provide island-hopping tours for tourists.

== Demographics ==
The island has a population of 3,569.

== Transport ==
There are no regular or scheduled boat trips to Calituban, but chartered motorized bangka are available and docked at Bagacay Port for people to travel to the island.

== See also ==
• List of islands by population density
