= Nocnocan Island =

Island in Central Visayas, Philippines

Isla sa Nocnocan
- Location within Visayas, Philippines Location within Philippines

Geography
- Location: Danajon Bank
- Coordinates: 10°14′45″N 124°24′14″E
- Adjacent to: Camotes Sea
- Area: 0.04 km^{2} (0.015 sq mi)

Administration
- Philippines
- Region: Central Visayas
- Province: Bohol
- Municipality: Talibon

Demographics
- Population: 1,822 (2024)
- Pop. density: 45,550/km^{2} (117970/sq mi)
- Ethnic groups: Cebuano

Nocnocan is an island off the coast of northern Bohol, Philippines. Located in the Camotes Sea, it a part of the chain of islands that are situated in the Danajon Bank, the only double barrier reef of the country. It is governed locally by Barangay Nocnocan, under the jurisdiction of the municipality of Talibon, Bohol. The island is around 13 km. northeast from the port of Talibon. Due to its proximity to the rich fishing grounds of the Danajon Reef, fishing is the main source of livelihood of the residents. They supply sea food, such as fish, crustaceans, mollusks and seaweeds to the markets in Bohol and Metro Cebu.

== Demographics ==
The 2020 census estimates that the population of Nocnocan is 1,822 The island is considered to have a very high population density in the country. With an area of 0.04 km^{2}, the population density is 45,550 per km^{2}.

== Education ==
The island has one public school, Nocnocan Elementary School.

== Healthcare ==
Nocnocan was identified as a Geographically-Island and Disadvantaged Area or GIDA by the Department of Health in December 2022. GIDA refers to areas that has either physical or socio-economic factors that limit the delivery of basic health services and needs strengthening of their local healthcare systems.

== Biodiversity ==
Diverse species of staircase shells or sundials and seahorses are found in Nocnocan.

== Transport ==
There are no regular or scheduled daily boat trips to the island. To be able to go to Nocnocan, people travel to the island by hiring a chartered motorized bangka docked in Talibon Port or in Pasil Fish Port in Cebu City.

== See also ==
- List of islands by population density
