= Canigao Channel =

Philippine strait

- Location within the Philippines Canigao Channel (Philippines)
- Location: Central Visayas; Eastern Visayas
- Coordinates: 10°15′0″N 124°42′0″E
- Type: Strait
- Part of: Bohol Sea; Camotes Sea

Canigao Channel is a strait in the Central Visayan and Eastern Visayan regions in the Philippines. This strait separates the islands of Bohol and Leyte, while the Cebu Strait separates Bohol and Cebu. Thus, the Camotes Sea is connected to the Bohol Sea both by the Canigao Channel (east of Bohol) and Cebu Strait (west of Bohol).

The Adam Reef, the Abel Reef, the Cain Reef, and the Eve Reef are coral reefs that can be found in this channel. The Tood Islets and Canigao Island can also be found in this channel.

== See also ==
- Camotes Sea — one of the inland seas of the Philippines.
- Cebu Strait — separates Bohol and Cebu
- Danajon Bank — the only double barrier reef of the Philippines.
- Geography of the Visayas — the central island group of the Philippines.
