= Danajon Bank =

- Double Reef
- Location within the Philippines
- Coordinates: 10°16′N 124°17′E

Dimensions
  - Length: 97 mi

The Danajon Bank is the only double barrier reef in the Philippines, which is a very rare geological formation, which is located in the Camotes Sea. It comprises two sets of large coral reefs that formed offshore on a submarine ridge due to a combination of favorable tidal currents and coral growth in the area.

== Overview ==
One of only six double barrier reefs in the world, Danajon Bank runs for 156 kilometers [97 miles] in the Central Visayas, between the following islands: Bohol, Cebu, and Leyte. There are only 3 major passages through this double reef — the NorthWest Pass, the Middle Pass, & the NorthEast Pass. The Danajon Bank's overall area is 272 square kilometers [105 square miles], with an aggregate coastline of 699 kilometers [434 miles], which includes 40 islands. The Danajon Bank makes up over 1% of the total coral reef area of the Philippines, which is estimated at 27,000 square kilometers [10,424 square miles].

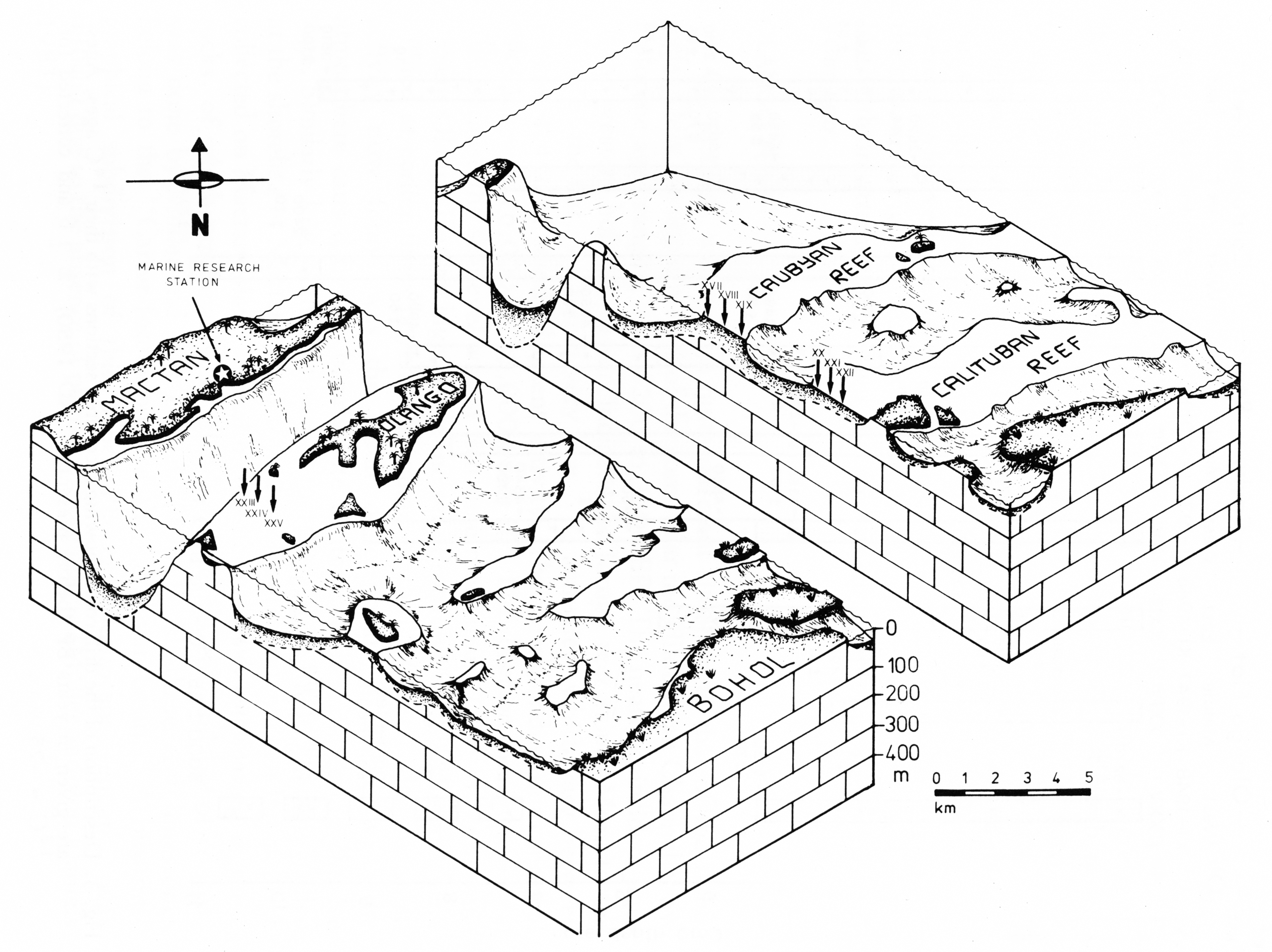
Cross-section of the Danajon Bank & the NorthWest Pass, with Mactan Island & Olango Island.

== Conservation efforts ==
Due to overfishing, the Danajon Bank has a declining population of fish, and many upper-level predators have ceased to hunt along the reef. To counteract this, 34 Marine Protected Areas have been established.

From 2003 to 2010 USAID funded the FISH Project, a conservation project aimed at managing fisheries in the Philippines, including those on the Danajon Bank. Dynamite fishing is the preferred method of fishing there, and the fish catch has considerably dwindled due to the absence of the fish and the destruction of the various coral reef habitats.

== Species ==
Species such as flathead fish, anemonefish, parrotfish, angels, wrasses, blue-edged sole, and messmate pipefish are present in the ecosystem of the Danajon Bank. Large sea fans and sponges live in the areas with deeper water, as does branch coral.

The reef is also home to three endangered coral species such as the mushroom coral, bubble coral, and elegance coral. Seahorses live in the reef, and have become a popular attraction for environmentalists seeking to observe the animal in its natural habitat.

It is home to a vast array of commercially valuable reef fishes, shellfish, crustaceans, and invertebrates such as sea cucumbers and sea urchins. Its extensive seagrass beds are nursery and feeding grounds for various species of rabbitfish (siganids) and sea horses, while its mangroves are spawning habitats for crustaceans, shrimps, and various fishes. Almost all sea grasses that occur in the Republic of the Philippines are well represented in this double barrier reef.

== Islands ==
Small islands are situated in the Danajon Bank. Since the area is rich is marine resources, these islands are mostly populated with fisherfolks. Some of these islands are the most densely populated islands in the world.

Islands of the Danajon Bank
Municipality/City	Name of Island
Bato, Leyte	Dawahon
Bien Unido, Bohol	Bilangbilangan East; Hingotanan; Malingin; Sagasa
Buenavista, Bohol	Cabul-an
Calape, Bohol	Mantatao
Getafe, Bohol	Banacon; Nasingin; Pandanon
Inabanga, Bohol	Cuaming; Hambongan
Lapu-Lapu City	Caubian Islands
Talibon, Bohol	Cataban; Calituban; Guindacpan; Nocnocan
Tubigon, Bohol	Bagongbanwa; Batasan; Bilangbilangan; Mocaboc; Pangapasan; Ubay Island

== Management Council ==
A memorandum of agreement was signed on September 7, 2022, for the creation of the Bohol Danajon Bank Double Barrier Reef Management Council (BDBDBRMC). This agreement was participated by the Department of Environment and Natural Resources, the Bureau of Fisheries and Aquatic Resources, the provincial government of Bohol and the municipal government units of Bien Unido, Buenavista, Clarin, Getafe, Inabanga, Pres. Carlos P. Garcia, Talibon, Trinidad, Tubigon and Ubay.

The formation of the management council aims to implement proper management, protection and conservation of the Danajon Bank barrier reef that has been the breeding ground of various marine creatures, ensure food security and livelihood for communities that depend on its fishing grounds and develop the area for ecotourism.

The local governments of Cebu, Leyte and Southern Leyte that are in the vicinity of the Danajon Bank are invited to join the management council.

== See also ==
- Camotes Sea — the sea in which this double barrier reef is located.
