= Cuaming Island =

Philippine island

Isla sa Cuaming
- Location within Visayas, Philippines Location within Philippines

Geography
- Coordinates: 10°6′45″N 123°59′13″E
- Adjacent to: Cebu Strait
- Area: 0.10 km^{2} (0.039 sq mi)

Administration
- Philippines
- Region: Central Visayas
- Province: Bohol
- Municipality: Inabanga

Demographics
- Population: 3,178 (2024)
- Pop. density: 31,780/km^{2} (82310/sq mi)
- Ethnic groups: Cebuano

Cuaming is an island located at the Cebu Strait, in the Visayas region, Philippines. It is part of the islands situated in the Danajon Bank, the country's only double barrier reef. The island's residents are mostly dependent entirely on fishing. Cuaming is one of the most densely populated islands in the Philippines.

== Government ==
The island is locally governed by Barangay Cuaming, under the jurisdiction of the municipal government of Inabanga, Bohol.

== Geography ==
Cuaming is located 11 km (6.8 mi) northwest from the port of Inabanga and 15 km (9.3 mi) south-southwest from Cordova, Cebu. The island's total area is around 0.10 km^{2} (0.039 sq mi).

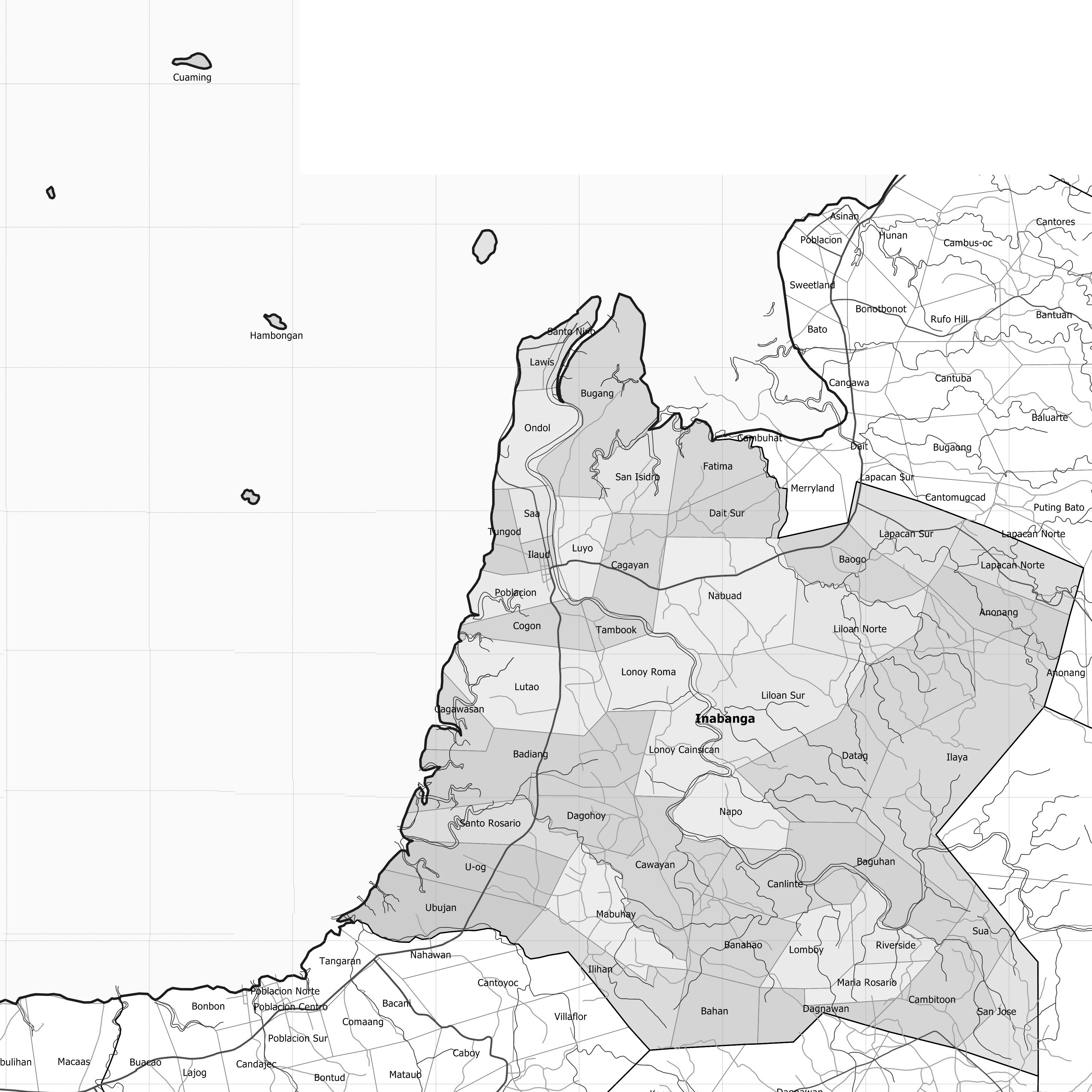
Map of Inabanga showing its barangays. Cuaming Island is situated in the top-left corner

== Demographics ==
According to the latest 2024 census, Cuaming has a population of 3,178, making it the most populated barangay in the town of Inabanga. The population density of the island is 31,780 inhabitants per square kilometre (82,300/sq mi).

== Recent history ==
In April 2021, the National Power Corporation (NAPOCOR) plans to install a renewable energy (RE) - diesel hybrid power plant in Cuaming Island. This is under the NAPOCOR's RE program in off-grid areas.

In December 2021, Cuaming is one of the areas that was badly affected by the onslaught of Typhoon Rai or known as Super Typhoon Odette in the Philippines. Many houses and infrastructure was damaged. The local government provided relief aid, including food and water to the residents of Cuaming days after the tropical cyclone. Also, a non-profit foundation donated fishing boats to affected fisherfolk, who lost them after the disaster.

== Education ==
Cuaming Island has two public schools.

- Cuaming Elementary School
- Cuaming High School

== Utilities ==
Electricity

The National Power Corporation - Small Power Utilities Group has a diesel power plant in Cuaming Island. Bohol I Electronic Cooperative, Inc. is in charge distributing electricity to the houses in the island.

== See also ==
- List of islands by population density
