= Mantatao Island =

Island of Bohol, Philippines

Isla sa Mantatao
- Location within Visayas

Geography
- Coordinates: 9°56′34″N 123°51′17″E
- Archipelago: Philippine
- Adjacent to: Cebu Strait
- Area: 0.06 km^{2} (0.023 sq mi)

Administration
- Philippines
- Region: Central Visayas
- Province: Bohol
- Municipality: Calape
- Barangay: Mantatao

Demographics
- Population: 873 (2024)
- Pop. density: 14,550/km^{2} (37680/sq mi)
- Ethnic groups: Cebuano

Mantatao is an island off the coast of Bohol, Philippines. Situated in the Cebu Strait, the island is approximately 5 km (3.1 mi) north-northwest from the town center of Calape, Bohol. Mantatao is one of multiple chains of islands located in the Danajon Bank, the only double barrier reef in the country. The island is one of the 33 barangays that comprise the municipality of Calape. As of 2024, Mantatao's population is 873.

With a total estimated area of 0.06 km^{2} (0.023 sq mi), the island has a high population density. It is known for having an abundance of fish, squid, shell/clams and seaweeds. Mantatao Island is surrounded by mangrove forest, which is the natural habitat for marine creatures. It has an elementary school and a diesel power plant, which is operated by the National Power Corporation.

Recently, the island has experienced several natural hazards that greatly impacted its inhabitants and their livelihood. Mantatao was affected during the 7.2 2013 Bohol Earthquake. The earthquake created a sinking or lowering of the ground known as subsidence. During high tide, the island becomes submerged as seawaters flood the entire island. In 2021, the residents of the island were affected by Typhoon Rai or Supertyphoon Odette in the Philippines. Families were immediately evacuated to the mainland prior to the typhoon's landfall.

== See also ==
- List of islands by population density
