= Talibon =

Municipality in Bohol, Philippines

- Municipality
- Municipality of Talibon
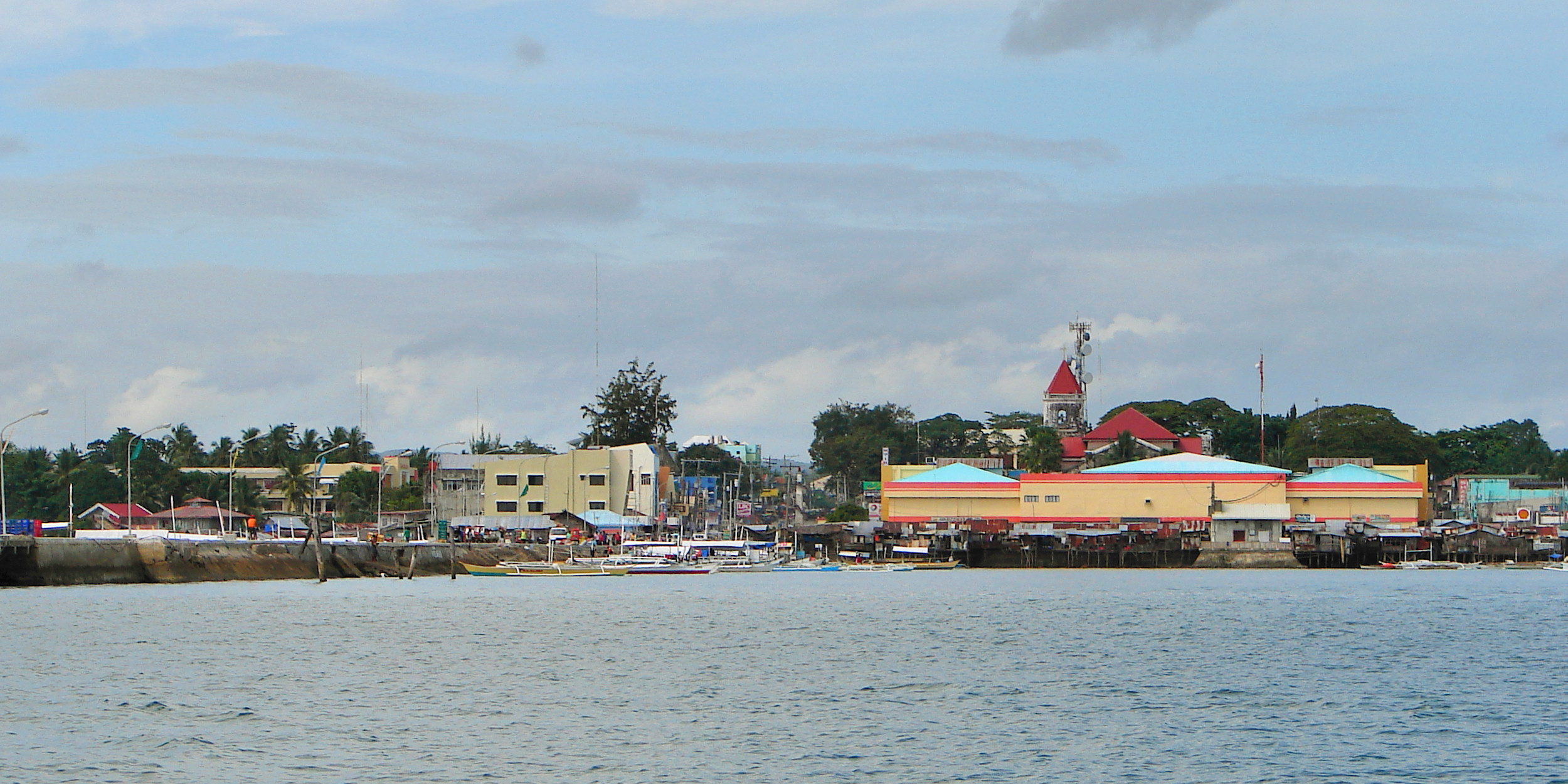
- Talibon skyline

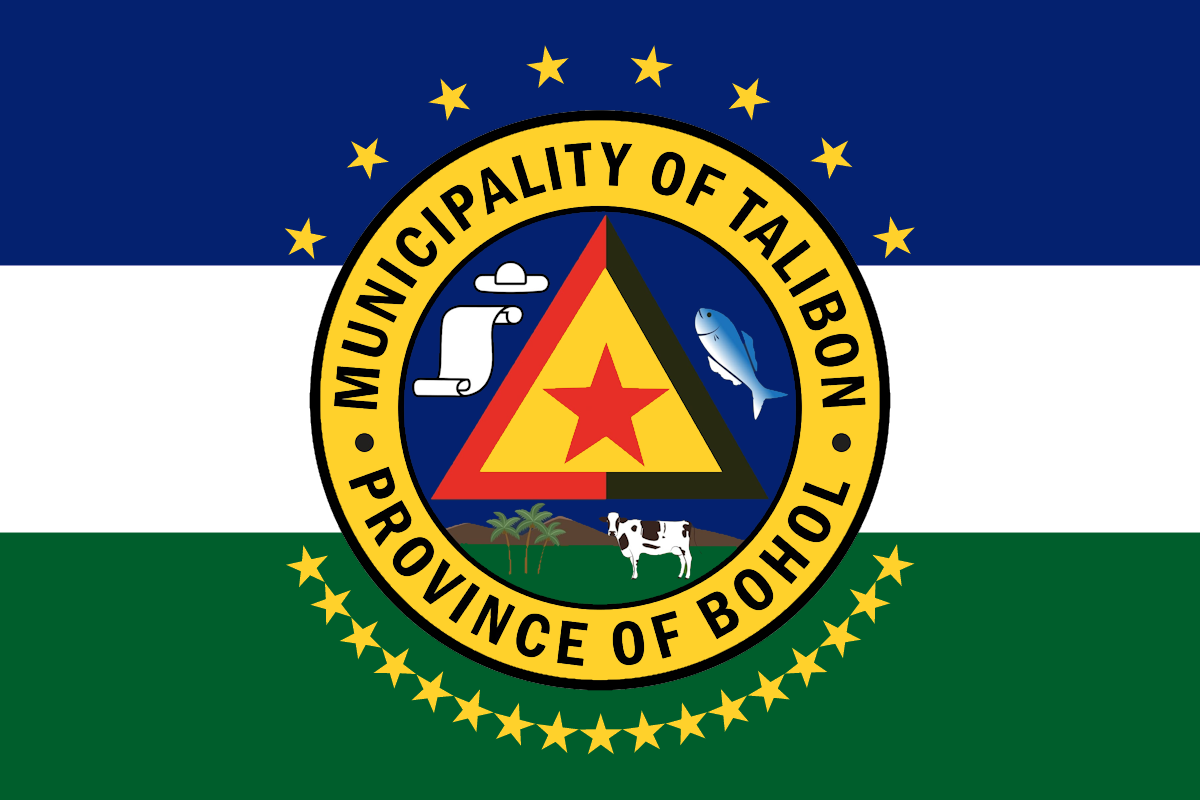
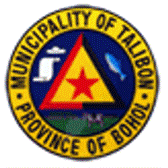
- Flag Seal

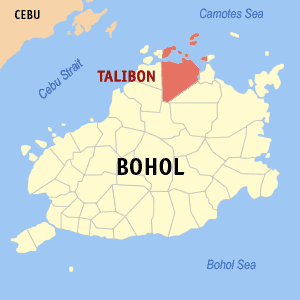
- Map of Bohol with Talibon highlighted
- Interactive map of Talibon
- Location within the Philippines
- Coordinates: 10°09′04″N 124°19′37″E
- Country: Philippines
- Region: Central Visayas
- Province: Bohol
- District: 2nd district
- Founded: 1830
- Barangays: 25 (see Barangays)

Government
  - Type: Sangguniang Bayan
  - Mayor: Janette A. Garcia
  - Vice Mayor: Dave A. Evangelista
  - Representative: Ma. Vanessa Cadorna-Aumentado
  - Municipal Council: Members: Expedito F. Abuan; Jocelyn A. Amba; Jerald P. Taneo; Apolinario A. Artiaga; Nomie T. Valmoria; Placidito O. Doroy; Edwin P. Cresencio; Raul C. Austria
  - Electorate: 45,197 voters (2025)

Area
  - Total: 140.46 km^{2} (54.23 sq mi)
- Elevation: 7.0 m (23.0 ft)
- Highest elevation: 85 m (279 ft)
- Lowest elevation: 0 m (0 ft)

Population (2024 census)
  - Total: 71,450
  - Density: 508.7/km^{2} (1,317/sq mi)
  - Households: 16,515

Economy
  - Income class: 1st municipal income class
  - Poverty incidence: 22.63% (2023)
  - Revenue: ₱ 464 million (2024)
  - Assets: ₱ 804 million (2024)
  - Expenditure: ₱ 446.4 million (2024)
  - Liabilities: ₱ 214.6 million (2024)

Service provider
  - Electricity: Bohol 2 Electric Cooperative (BOHECO 2)
- Time zone: UTC+8 (PST)
- ZIP code: 6325
- PSGC: 0701243000
- IDD : area code: +63 (0)38
- Native languages: Boholano dialect Cebuano; Tagalog
- Website: www.talibon-bohol.gov.ph

Talibon, officially the Municipality of Talibon (Cebuano: Lungsod sa Talibon; Tagalog: Bayan ng Talibon), is a municipality in the province of Bohol, Philippines. According to the 2024 census, it has a population of 71,450 people, making it the second-most populous town in Bohol, behind Ubay.

The town is also known as the birthplace of Carlos P. Garcia, the 8th President of the Philippines.

== Etymology ==
The name Talibon is said to come from the word talibong, a type of Visayan sword. There is no actual record to show how the name came about but as per the records of the travels of Jesuit missionary Fr. Juan de Torres, S.J., he went to the gold mines of Talibong. It already had its name before the first arrival of the first Spanish missionary.

== History ==
According to archival researches of Fr. Jose Maria Luengo, a priest, historian, and founder of the Mater Dei College in Tubigon, Talibon traces its history back to the time of Portuguese conquistador Ferdinand Magellan after his death on 27 April 1521. Escaping from the hands of Lapu-Lapu's men who were bent on taking revenge for the rape of 50 virgins in Cebu, the crew of the ship Trinidad sailed towards the direction of Getafe and Talibon, where some of them disembarked and mingled with the natives of the place.

After settling in the area, members of the crew took native wives and introduced them to the basic teachings of Christianity. They dedicated their settlement to the Most Holy Trinity (*Santísima Trinidad*) in honor of the patrons of their ill-fated ship. Some crew members, including Gonzalo Gómez de Espinosa and Ginés de Mafra, later became the first lay missionaries in Talibon. Fr. Luengo referred to them as the “Trinidad Christians of Talibon.”

In 1830, Talibon was established as an independent municipality from Inabanga. The following year, Talibon had become a dedicated parish to the Most Holy Trinity, with Fr. Ramon de Santa Ana as the first Spanish parish priest.

At first, a ramshackle hut built by the natives served as the church but in 1852, construction of the permanent church was started. With forced labor and the use of blocks of coral rocks, the church was built on an elevated plain overlooking the sea and was finished in 1899.

In June 1942, the locals woke up one morning to see truckloads of heavily armed troops of the Imperial Japanese Army's 175th Infantry Battalion in Poblacion. It was the first entry of the Japanese troops in the comparatively peaceful town. Before properly settling down, the Talibon Central Elementary School became the headquarters of the Japanese soldiers. After a few days, the invaders ransacked the cabinets in the municipal building for important records. They went from house to house, rounded up the civilians, and ordered them to stay at the municipal hall. Through an interpreter, a Japanese intelligence officer named 1st Lt. Mitsuo Kimura inquired for the municipal officials and after learning they had fled, he ordered the people to organize a civil government by electing the necessary officials. The Japanese threatened to burn all the houses and buildings in Poblacion if the people failed to organize the government. To save the town from the possibility of being reduced to ashes, the people organized a civil government and appointed the young lawyer Atty. Maximino C. Boiser as municipal mayor.

During the height of World War II, a guerrilla force against the Japanese 175th Infantry Battalion was secretly organized and then took control and authority over the town of Talibon. Former Senator Carlos P. Garcia acted as high adviser of the group. While Talibon was under Japanese occupation, he narrowly escaped capture by fleeing with his family to Leyte. In reprisal, the Japanese soldiers in Talibon, through the leadership of battalion commander Maj. Ichiro Tokogawa, burned down the Garcia house on 4 July 1942 and tortured volunteer guard Cesario Avergonzado for allegedly misleading them. Later on in 1943, Atty. Maximino C. Boiser, the municipal mayor of Talibon at that time, was executed by the guerillas for conspiring with the Japanese forces according to local witnesses.

In 1947, by virtue of Executive Order No. 80 signed by President Manuel Roxas, fifteen barrios from Talibon, along with three from Ubay, were segregated and organized into a separate municipality of Trinidad. Ipil, one of its former barrios, was designated as the new municipality's seat of government.

In 1957, when Carlos P. Garcia became the eighth president of the Philippines, the church was renovated under his initiative. According to the members of the prominent Boiser family of Talibon, the president would regularly visit Mr. Justo C. Boiser's house in Poblacion just to have lunch with him and his family as both sides were politically related. One of Justo's well-established children, Atty. Ramon L. Boiser, is a witness to how the two families talked about politics, interests, and future plans for Talibon's development. In honor of the Boisers in Talibon, a street was named after the family, which is located still in Poblacion.

In 1986, the Diocese of Talibon was created.

== Geography ==
The town of Talibon is located on the northern side of Bohol. It is bounded on the east by Bien Unido, on the south by Trinidad on the north by Camotes Sea and on the west by Getafe. Talibon has a land area of 140.46 square kilometres (54.23 sq mi) of which about 7.97 square kilometres (3.08 sq mi) or 5.7% is classified as urban, while the remaining 132.49 square kilometres (51.15 sq mi) is rural.

Accessibility to Talibon from the capital, Tagbilaran, is facilitated by the western or eastern exits of the Bohol Circumferential Road, located 115 and 150 kilometres (71 and 93 mi) away, respectively. Alternatively, travelers can reach Talibon through the interior road via Loboc, which is 109 kilometres (68 mi) distant. It can also be accessed by ferry directly from Cebu City or via Getafe or Tubigon, followed by a journey by road.

=== Barangays ===
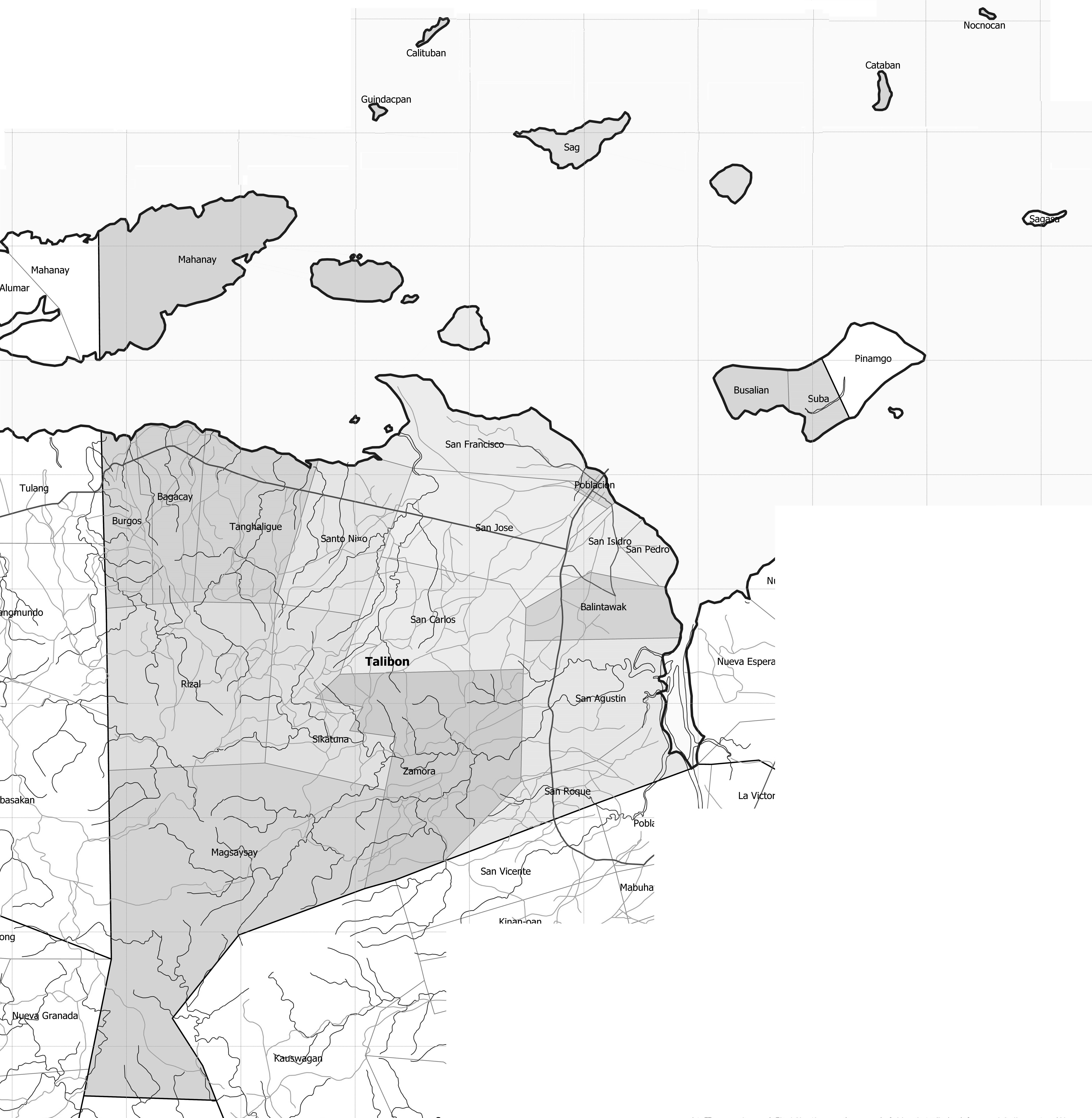
Map of Talibon showing barangays and islands

Talibon is politically subdivided into 25 barangays. Each barangay consists of puroks, and some have sitios.

There are 17 barangays located on the mainland and 8 island barangays, among which Nocnocan, Calituban, and Guindacpan are among the most densely populated islands in the world.

PSGC	Barangay	Population			±% p.a.	
		2024		2010		
071243001	Bagacay	5.0%	3,561	2,911	▴	1.41%
071243002	Balintawak	2.2%	1,586	1,517	▴	0.31%
071243006	Burgos	1.4%	1,022	1,020	▴	0.01%
071243007	Busalian	3.0%	2,135	2,031	▴	0.35%
071243008	Calituban	5.8%	4,145	4,064	▴	0.14%
071243009	Cataban	1.9%	1,348	1,262	▴	0.46%
071243010	Guindacpan	3.1%	2,216	2,202	▴	0.04%
071243013	Magsaysay	2.0%	1,446	1,347	▴	0.49%
071243014	Mahanay	2.5%	1,806	1,659	▴	0.59%
071243017	Nocnocan	2.7%	1,913	1,832	▴	0.30%
071243021	Poblacion	6.1%	4,333	4,112	▴	0.36%
071243023	Rizal	2.0%	1,452	1,472	▾	−0.09%
071243024	Sag	1.3%	908	996	▾	−0.64%
071243026	San Agustin	6.6%	4,747	3,867	▴	1.43%
071243027	San Carlos	2.2%	1,607	1,441	▴	0.76%
071243028	San Francisco	8.5%	6,062	5,510	▴	0.66%
071243029	San Isidro	6.1%	4,371	3,598	▴	1.36%
071243030	San Jose	8.6%	6,151	5,789	▴	0.42%
071243031	San Pedro	2.3%	1,670	1,500	▴	0.75%
071243032	San Roque	4.0%	2,891	2,590	▴	0.76%
071243033	Santo Niño	5.7%	4,060	3,804	▴	0.45%
071243034	Sikatuna	2.4%	1,731	1,703	▴	0.11%
071243035	Suba	2.7%	1,957	1,683	▴	1.05%
071243036	Tanghaligue	3.0%	2,170	2,062	▴	0.35%
071243038	Zamora	2.4%	1,681	1,401	▴	1.27%
	Total		71,450	61,373	▴	1.06%

=== Climate ===
Climate data for Talibon, Bohol
Month	Jan	Feb	Mar	Apr	May	Jun	Jul	Aug	Sep	Oct	Nov	Dec	Year
Mean daily maximum °C (°F)	28 (82)	28 (82)	29 (84)	31 (88)	31 (88)	30 (86)	30 (86)	30 (86)	30 (86)	29 (84)	29 (84)	28 (82)	29 (85)
Mean daily minimum °C (°F)	23 (73)	23 (73)	23 (73)	23 (73)	24 (75)	24 (75)	24 (75)	24 (75)	24 (75)	24 (75)	24 (75)	23 (73)	24 (74)
Average precipitation mm (inches)	98 (3.9)	82 (3.2)	96 (3.8)	71 (2.8)	104 (4.1)	129 (5.1)	101 (4.0)	94 (3.7)	99 (3.9)	135 (5.3)	174 (6.9)	143 (5.6)	1,326 (52.3)
Average rainy days	18.0	14.1	17.1	16.8	23.7	25.7	25.8	23.3	24.2	25.9	24.0	20.6	259.2
Source: Meteoblue

== Demographics ==
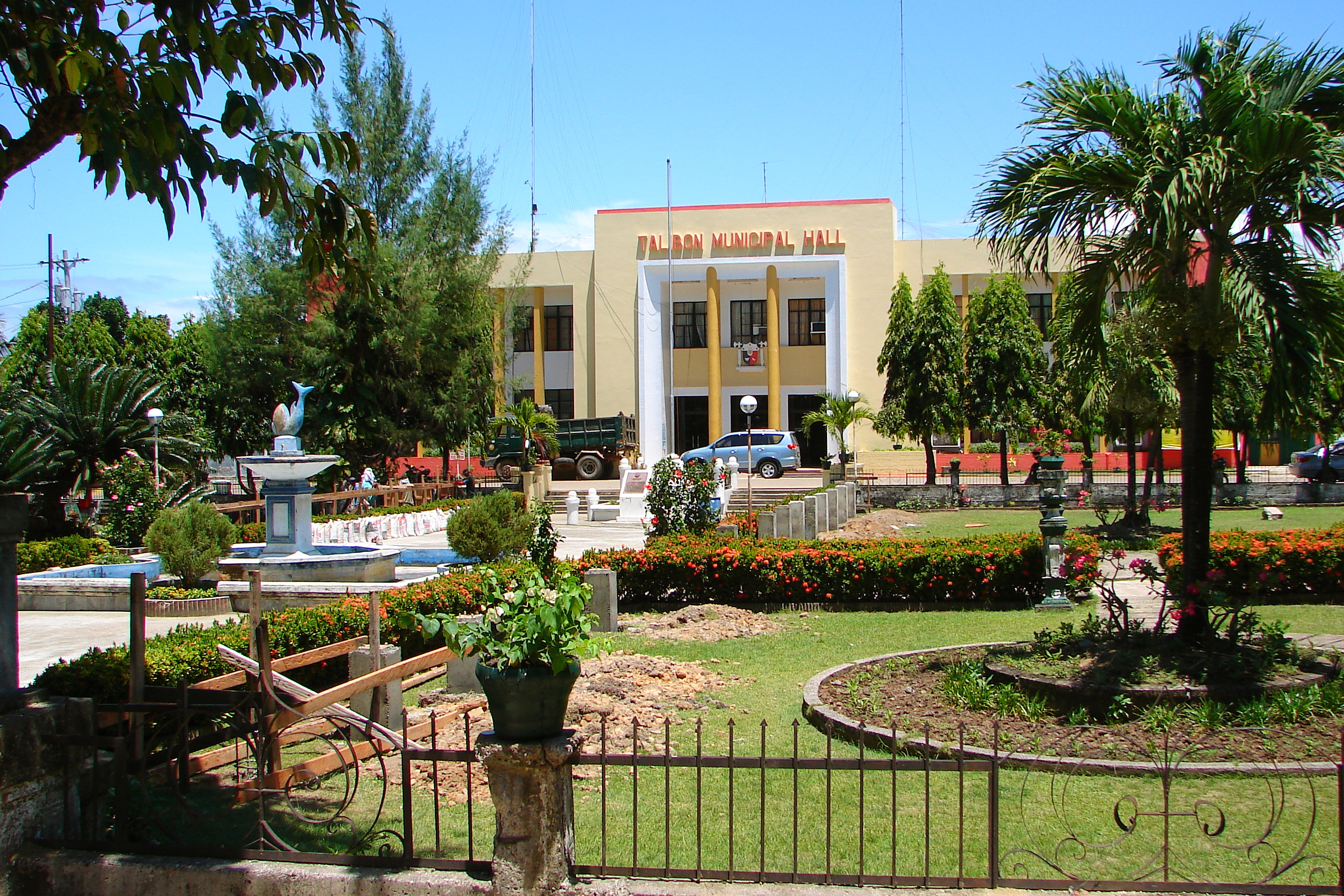
Municipal Hall of Talibon

Population census of Talibon
Year	Pop.	±% p.a.
1903	6,085	—
1918	12,227	+4.76%
1939	26,077	+3.67%
1948	23,455	−1.17%
1960	30,640	+2.25%
1970	35,223	+1.40%
1975	41,270	+3.23%
1980	46,110	+2.24%
1990	41,873	−0.96%
1995	44,854	+1.30%
2000	54,147	+4.12%
2007	59,274	+1.26%
2010	61,373	+1.27%
2015	66,969	+1.68%
2020	71,272	+1.32%
2024	71,450	+0.06%
Source: Philippine Statistics Authority

== Economy ==
Poverty incidence of Talibon (%)

Source: Philippine Statistics Authority

Major industries in Talibon are farming and fishing with major products such as rice, corn, copra, banana, root crops, and seafood. It is quickly becoming a hub for retailers, wholesalers, and traders. The municipality is home to one of the branches of Cebu-based Alturas Group of Companies, which has established a mall and supermarket in the area.

The locals are also into seaweed farming, rice farming, banana farming, cacao farming, and tending of fish ponds. Silica, limestone, diorites, sand, iron ore, and gravel abound and quarrying of these minerals are a large industry at present. These minerals are shipped to Cebu and Iligan aboard bulk carriers and barges as these locations are known for cement production and mineral processing.

== Tourism ==
Some tourists visit the town for its beach and marine locations, such as Bongan Sandbar.

Visitors also explore its historical sites, such as the Talibon Cathedral and the Carlos P. Garcia Monument and Park. The municipality holds significance as the birthplace of Carlos P. Garcia, a prominent figure in the town's history, who played a pivotal role in the guerrilla movement and later served as the 4th President of the Philippines.

In 2026, the Talibon Coastal Road opened. Stretching from the vicinity of the port area in Brgy. Poblacion all the way to Brgy. San Francisco, it is also visited by tourists as a place of recreation, teeming with views of Talibon's skyline and the Camotes Sea.

=== Ecotourism ===
Among Talibon's natural attractions is Danajon Bank, the Philippines' only double barrier reef and one of the few documented double barrier reefs in the world. A very rare geological formation, it comprises two sets of large coral reefs that formed offshore on a submarine ridge due to a combination of favorable tidal currents and coral growth in the area. Talibon shares responsibility over Danajon together with 9 other Bohol towns that have jurisdiction over the reef. It is home to a vast array of commercially valuable reef fishes, shellfish, crustaceans and invertebrates such as sea cucumbers and sea urchins. Its extensive seagrass beds are nursery and feeding grounds for various species of rabbitfish (siganids) and sea horses, while its mangroves are spawning habitats for crustaceans, shrimps and various fishes.

In order to showcase and promote efforts to protect and manage Danajon Bank, the municipal government of Talibon opened the CRM Interpretive Center, otherwise known as the Fisheries and Coastal Resource Management Interpretive Center (FCRMIC). The Center boasts a 3D model of Danajon Bank, the first of its kind in Bohol and even in the whole of the Visayas. It is now becoming a drop-in site for school and foreign tours alike.

Other natural attractions include pristine islands like the Bongan sandbar, known for its expansive white sandy beach and clear waters, making it an ideal spot for swimming, snorkeling, and scuba diving. Additionally, the Ipil River offers opportunities for boating, kayaking, fishing, swimming, and shell gathering due to the abundant mollusks in the area. Inland from the river, visitors can observe wildlife such as wild ducks, herons, and egrets. In San Isidro, a mangrove area has become a habitat for monkeys. Another notable feature is the presence of centuries-old piyapi trees, which are abundant in the area.

== Education ==
Almost every barangay in Talibon's vicinity has its public elementary school, making students, teachers, and parents alike have a sufficient array of choices. The same goes for secondary schools as it has an abundant selection to private and public education.

== Diocese of Talibon ==
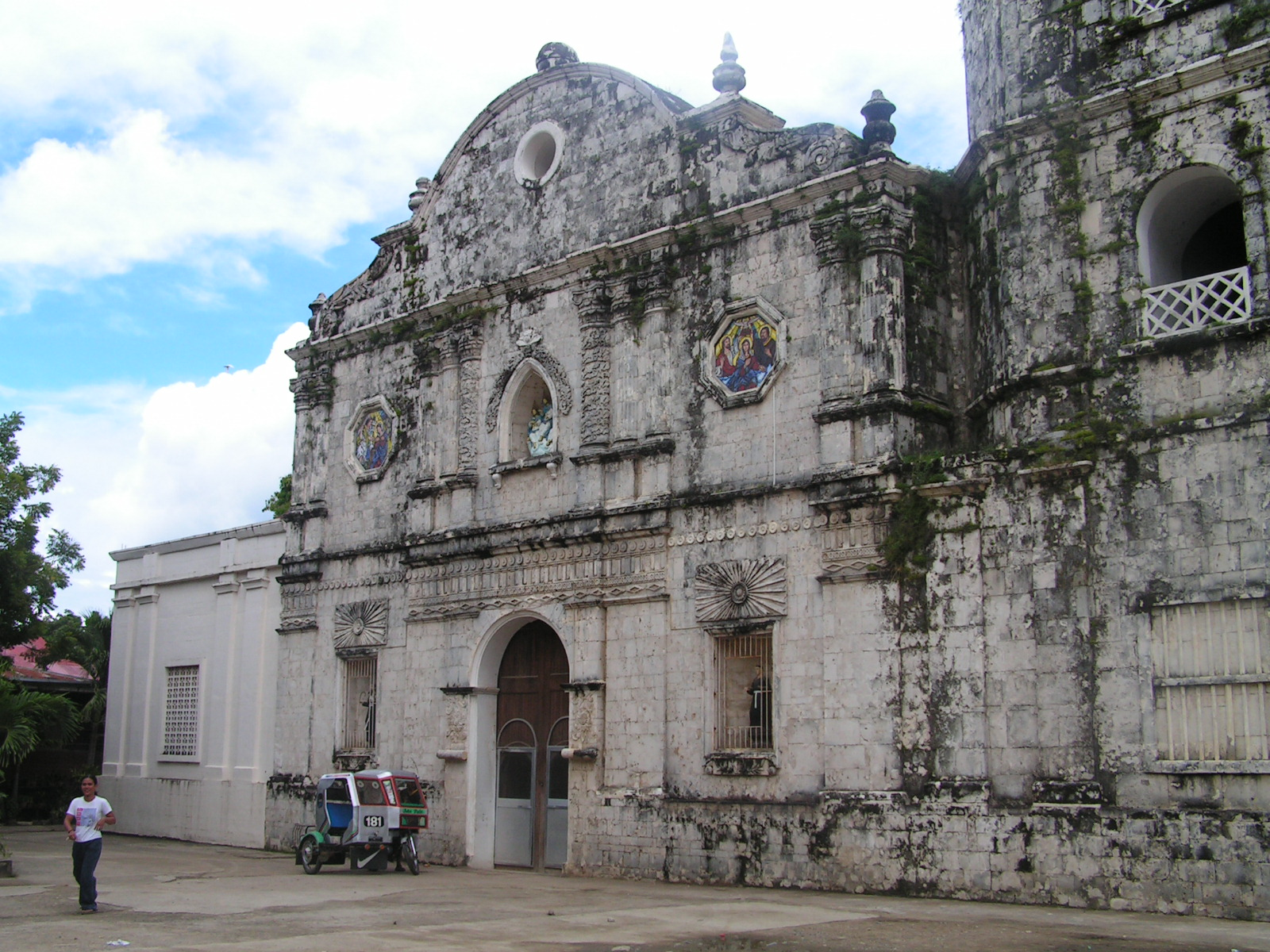
Blessed Trinity Cathedral, Talibon

The town is the episcopal see of the Diocese of Talibon, which covers the eastern half of the civil province of Bohol. It celebrates its feast day on the last Saturday of May in honour of the town patron, the Blessed Trinity.

The territory, covered by the diocese of Talibon, extends from the town of Inabanga on the northwest, through Carmen in the interior, and down to Jagna on the southeast. Its inland boundary bisects the island northwest—southeast, with the other half of the island under the jurisdiction of the diocese of Tagbilaran.

The first batch of missionaries to arrive were the Augustinian Recollects who came in 1565. When the Jesuits arrived in 1596 and reached the area of Talibon, they were surprised to discover that a Christian community already existed in the area, owing to the Spanish–Talibongnon intermarriages dating back to the 1520s.

After the Jesuits came, the faith spread fast revolts in the country against Spain. Tamblot revolted in 1622. Although his success lasted only for six months, his revolt is recorded as the first unbeaten revolt in Philippine history. In 1744, Dagohoy revolted and gained independence for the island of Bohol for eighty years.

On 8 November 1941, the Diocese of Tagbilaran was established and was given jurisdiction over the entire province of Bohol, separating it from Cebu, its mother diocese. On 9 January 1986, the new Diocese of Talibon was created, separating half of Bohol from the Diocese of Tagbilaran. Most Rev. Christian Vicente Fernandez Noel, D.D., was appointed as its first bishop in September 1986 and whose office he held until Pope Francis appointed Most Rev. Patrick Daniel Y. Parcon, D.D. on 6 June 2014 as its second bishop, and was eventually installed on 22 August 2014.

To this day, there are 25 parishes in the diocese, ministered by 50 priests. There are also 35 religious sisters active in the running of 16 secondary Catholic schools.

== Notable people ==
- Bernardito Auza, Archbishop, Apostolic Nuncio of Vatican to Spain
- Nonito Donaire, World Champion Boxer
- Carlos P. Garcia, eighth President of the Philippines
- Lauro Mumar, PBA Player
