= Bato, Leyte =

Municipality in Leyte, Philippines

Bato
- Municipality
- Municipality of Bato
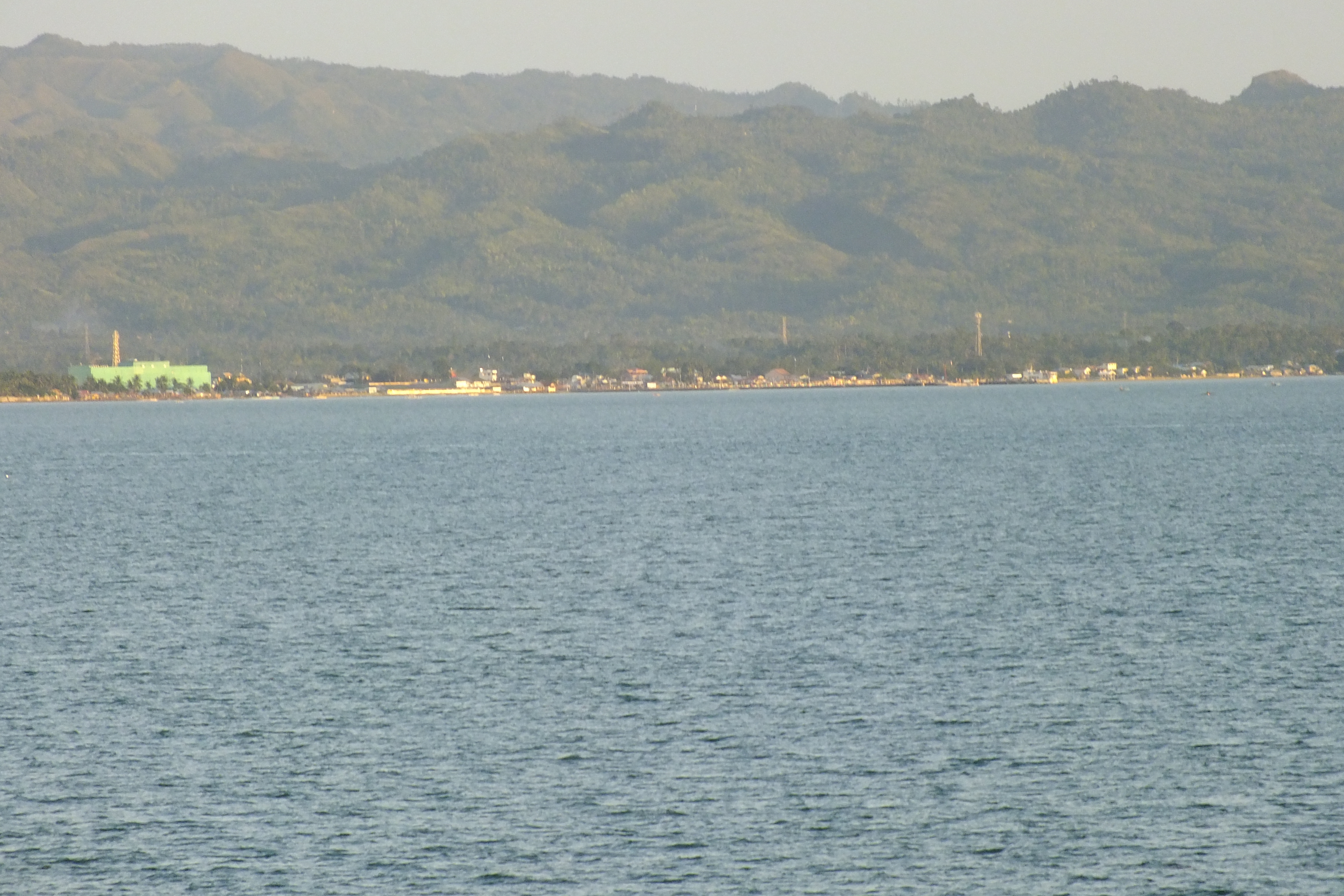

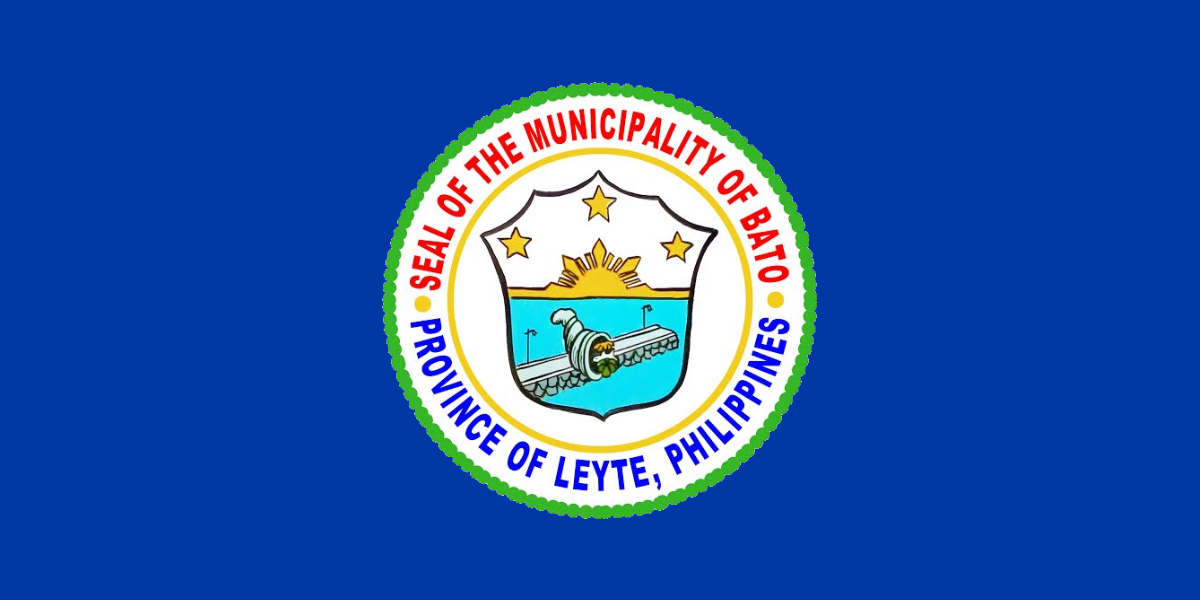
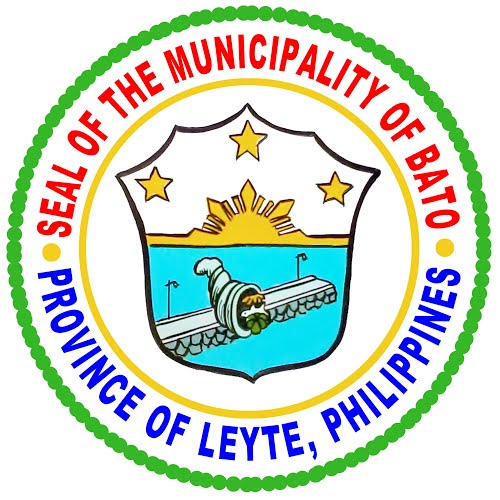
- Flag Seal

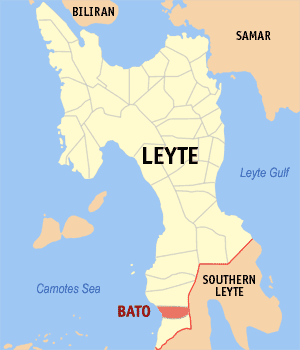
- Map of Leyte with Bato highlighted
- Interactive map of Bato
- Location within the Philippines
- Coordinates: 10°19′41″N 124°47′31″E
- Country: Philippines
- Region: Eastern Visayas
- Province: Leyte
- District: 5th district
- Barangays: 32 (see Barangays)

Government
  - Type: Sangguniang Bayan
  - Mayor: Nathaniel B. Gertos
  - Vice Mayor: Bryan Nile "Tata Nile" A. Gertos
  - Representative: Carl Nicolas C. Cari
  - Councilors: List: • Anthony S. Echevarre; • Gilbert P. Buzon; • Danilo A. Pitogo; • Roderick B. Rances; • Cresenciano R. Avila; • Marissa M. Rojas; • Gerry E. Aureo; • Pepe B. Diao; DILG Masterlist of Officials
  - Electorate: 24,961 voters (2025)

Area
  - Total: 72.45 km^{2} (27.97 sq mi)
- Elevation: 75 m (246 ft)
- Highest elevation: 1,133 m (3,717 ft)
- Lowest elevation: 0 m (0 ft)

Population (2024 census)
  - Total: 39,275
  - Density: 542.1/km^{2} (1,404/sq mi)
  - Households: 9,115

Economy
  - Income class: 2nd municipal income class
  - Poverty incidence: 31.58% (2023)
  - Revenue: ₱ 243.5 million (2024)
  - Assets: ₱ 383.2 million (2024)
  - Expenditure: ₱ 235.9 million (2024)
  - Liabilities: ₱ 52.16 million (2024)

Service provider
  - Electricity: Leyte 4 Electric Cooperative (LEYECO 4)
- Time zone: UTC+8 (PST)
- ZIP code: 6525
- PSGC: 0803707000
- IDD : area code: +63 (0)5
- Native languages: Cebuano; Tagalog
- Website: www.bato-leyte.gov.ph

Bato (IPA: [bɐ'to]), officially the Municipality of Bato (Cebuano: Lungsod sa Bato; Waray: Bungto han Bato; Tagalog: Bayan ng Bato), is a municipality in the province of Leyte, Philippines. According to the 2024 census, it has a population of 39,275 people.

It borders with the municipality of Matalom in the south, Hilongos in the north, and Bontoc to the east. Bato, together with Hilongos, is also a center of commerce, trade and education in southwestern part of Leyte.

== Etymology ==
The place got its name from the expression adto sa bato, which refers to the church made of stone.

== Geography ==
=== Barangays ===
Bato is politically subdivided into 32 barangays. Each barangay consists of puroks and some have sitios.

- Alegria
- Alejos
- Amagos
- Anahawan
- Bago
- Bagong Bayan District (Poblacion)
- Buli
- Cebuana
- Daan Lungsod
- Dawahon
- Himamaa
- Dolho
- Domagocdoc
- Guerrero District (Poblacion)
- Imelda
- Iniguihan District (Poblacion)
- Kalanggaman District (Poblacion)
- Katipunan
- Liberty
- Mabini
- Marcelo
- Naga
- Osmeña
- Plaridel
- Ponong
- Revilla
- San Agustin
- SanNiño and or SanNiña
- Tabunok
- Tagaytay
- Tinago District (Poblacion)
- Tugas

=== Climate ===
Climate data for Bato, Leyte
Month	Jan	Feb	Mar	Apr	May	Jun	Jul	Aug	Sep	Oct	Nov	Dec	Year
Mean daily maximum °C (°F)	28 (82)	29 (84)	29 (84)	30 (86)	30 (86)	30 (86)	29 (84)	29 (84)	29 (84)	29 (84)	29 (84)	29 (84)	29 (84)
Mean daily minimum °C (°F)	22 (72)	22 (72)	22 (72)	23 (73)	25 (77)	25 (77)	25 (77)	25 (77)	25 (77)	24 (75)	24 (75)	23 (73)	24 (75)
Average precipitation mm (inches)	78 (3.1)	57 (2.2)	84 (3.3)	79 (3.1)	118 (4.6)	181 (7.1)	178 (7.0)	169 (6.7)	172 (6.8)	180 (7.1)	174 (6.9)	128 (5.0)	1,598 (62.9)
Average rainy days	16.7	13.8	17.3	18.5	23.2	26.5	27.1	26.0	26.4	27.5	24.6	21.0	268.6
Source: Meteoblue

== Demographics ==
Population census of Bato
Year	Pop.	±% p.a.
1903	5,472	—
1918	7,937	+2.51%
1939	14,706	+2.98%
1948	16,406	+1.22%
1960	18,915	+1.19%
1970	20,533	+0.82%
1975	22,241	+1.62%
1980	24,529	+1.98%
1990	28,197	+1.40%
1995	29,810	+1.05%
2000	32,974	+2.19%
2007	33,930	+0.39%
2010	35,610	+1.77%
2015	38,356	+1.42%
2020	38,505	+0.08%
2024	39,275	+0.48%
Source: Philippine Statistics Authority

In the 2024 census, the population of Bato was 39,275 people, with a density of 540 inhabitants per square kilometre or 1,400 inhabitants per square mile.

== Economy ==
Poverty incidence of Bato

Source: Philippine Statistics Authority

== Transportation ==
=== Shipping companies operating in Bato ===
- Medallion Transport: day & night trips to Cebu City and vice versa
- Medallion Transport: day & night trips to Ubay, Bohol and vice versa
- Southern Pacific Shipping: night trips to Cebu City and vice versa
- & Local MBCAs or Motor Bancas (Cebuano: Pambot) which serves day trips to Ubay, Bohol and vice versa; also, to the Island-Barangay of Dawahon and vice versa.

=== Transit Bus Companies ===
- Super 5
- CUL Transport
- Mega Bus
- DLTB
- Ultrabus
- Philtranco

== Education ==
=== Tertiary education ===
- Bato Institute of Science and Technology, Inc.

=== Secondary education ===
(PUBLIC)

- Bato School of Fisheries
- Bato National High School
- Dawahon National High School
- Anahawan National High School
- Buli National High School

(PRIVATE)

- Bato Institute Of Science and Technology Inc. (High School Department)
- Bato Academy

=== Elementary education ===
(PUBLIC)

EAST DISTRICT

- Anahawan Central School (Barangay Anahawan)
- Alejos Elementary School
- Tagaytay Elementary School
- Naga Elementary School
- Mabini Elementary School
- Bago Elementary School
- Himama-a Elementary School
- Liberty Elementary School
- Katipunan Elementary School
- Revilla Primary School
- Cebuana Primary School
- Plaridel Elementary School
- Osmena Elementary School
- Buli Elementary School
- Talisayan Primary School
- Imelda Elementary School

WEST DISTRICT

- Bato Central School (Brgys. Tinago and Kalanggaman)
- Dolho Elementary School
- Dawahon Elementary School
- Ponong Elementary School
- Tabunok Elementary School
- Tugas Elementary School
- Alegria Elementary School
- Amagos Elementary School
- Marcelo Elementary School
- Domagocdoc Primary School

(PRIVATE)

- Saint Teresa's School of Bato, Inc.
- Bato Institute of Science and Technology, Inc. (Elementary Department)
