= Bien Unido =

Municipality in Bohol, Philippines

- Municipality
- Municipality of Bien Unido
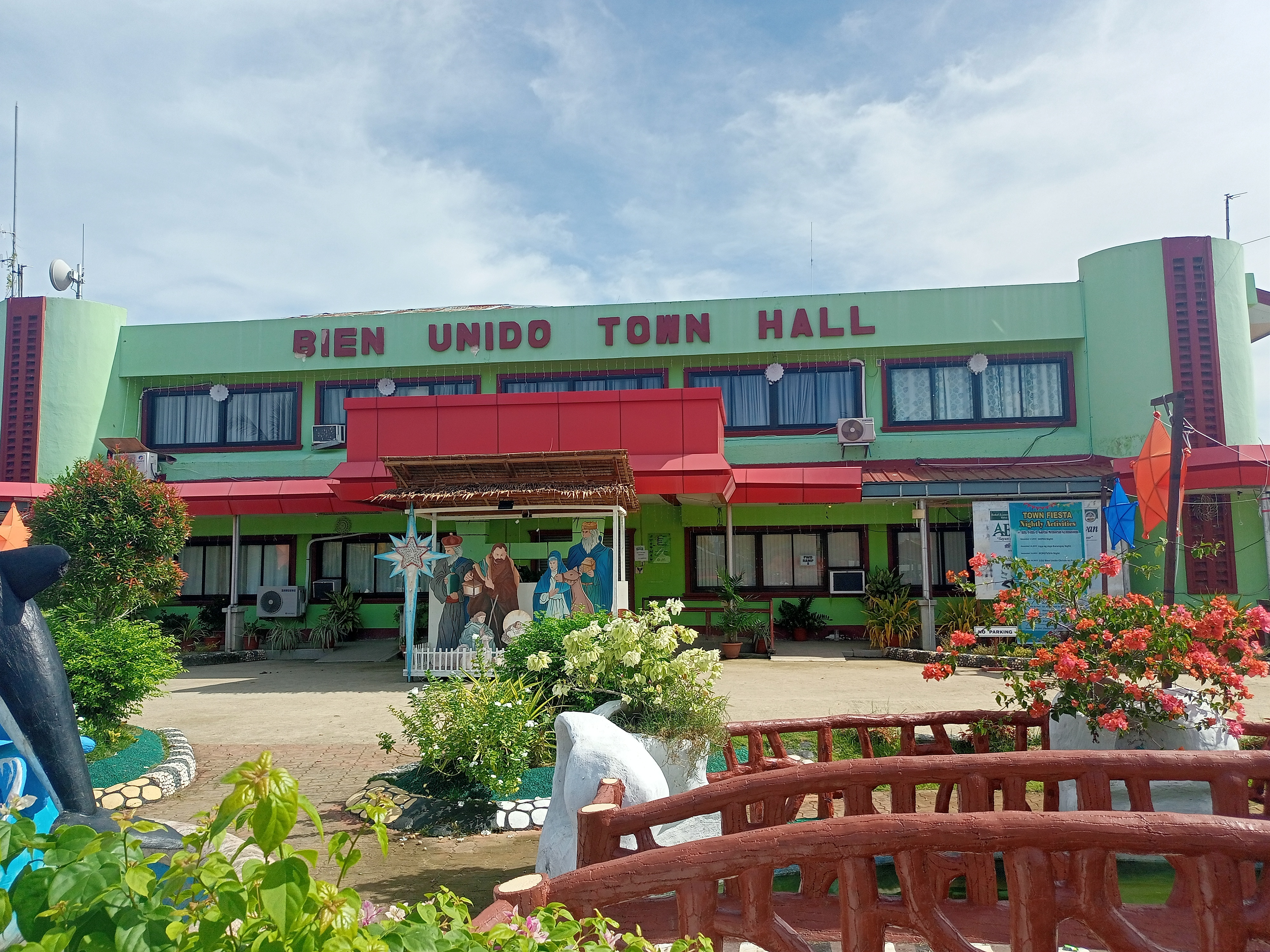
- Bien Unido Town Hall

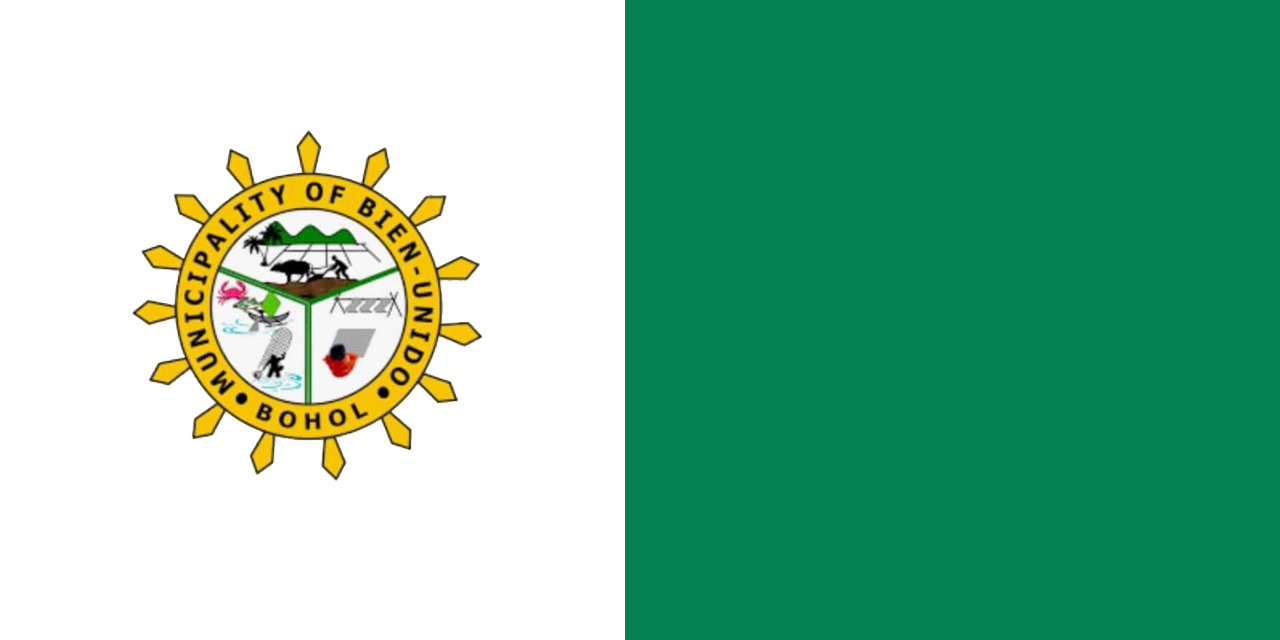
- Flag Seal

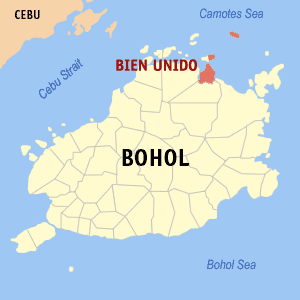
- Map of Bohol with Bien Unido highlighted
- Interactive map of Bien Unido
- Location within the Philippines
- Coordinates: 10°08′10″N 124°22′44″E
- Country: Philippines
- Region: Central Visayas
- Province: Bohol
- District: 2nd district
- Founded: 1981
- Barangays: 15 (see Barangays)

Government
  - Type: Sangguniang Bayan
  - Mayor: John Felix L. Garcia
  - Vice Mayor: Leonardo B. Querubin Jr.
  - Representative: Ma. Vanessa C. Aumentado
  - Municipal Council: Members: John Felix L. Garcia; Leonardo B. Querubin Jr.; Joselyn P. Villarias; Procopio L. Macua Jr.; Leonaria Avenido-Atillo; Veer Angelo A. Autida; Rosemarie A. Boniel; Alex L. Mabalatan
  - Electorate: 19,271 voters (2025)

Area
  - Total: 27.39 km^{2} (10.58 sq mi)
- Elevation: 2.0 m (6.6 ft)
- Highest elevation: 37 m (121 ft)
- Lowest elevation: 0 m (0 ft)

Population (2024 census)
  - Total: 26,278
  - Density: 959.4/km^{2} (2,485/sq mi)
  - Households: 6,100

Economy
  - Income class: 4th municipal income class
  - Poverty incidence: 24.85% (2023)
  - Revenue: ₱ 130.3 million (2024)
  - Assets: ₱ 270.9 million (2024)
  - Expenditure: ₱ 124 million (2024)
  - Liabilities: ₱ 56.01 million (2024)

Service provider
  - Electricity: Bohol 2 Electric Cooperative (BOHECO 2)
- Time zone: UTC+8 (PST)
- ZIP code: 6326
- PSGC: 0701248000
- IDD : area code: +63 (0)38
- Native languages: Boholano dialect Cebuano; Tagalog
- Website: https://bohol.gov.ph/bien-unido/

Bien Unido, officially the Municipality of Bien Unido (Cebuano: Munisipyo/Lungsod sa Bien Unido; Tagalog: Bayan ng Bien Unido), is a municipality in the province of Bohol, Philippines. According to the 2024 census, it has a population of 26,278 people.

Bien Unido is the youngest municipality in Bohol being founded in 1981 after it was carved out and separated from the municipalities of Trinidad and Talibon. Among the principal industries in Bien Unido are rice farming, seaweed farming, livestock raising, algaculture, fishing, and mat weaving. The town gained the nickname as the de facto Seaweeds Capital of the Visayas.

The "Bien Unido Double Barrier Reef Marine Park" is the first underwater pilgrimage in Asia, established in 2012. It is situated along the Danajon Bank.

The town of Bien Unido, Bohol celebrates its feast on December 28, to honor the town patron, the Holy Child.

== History ==
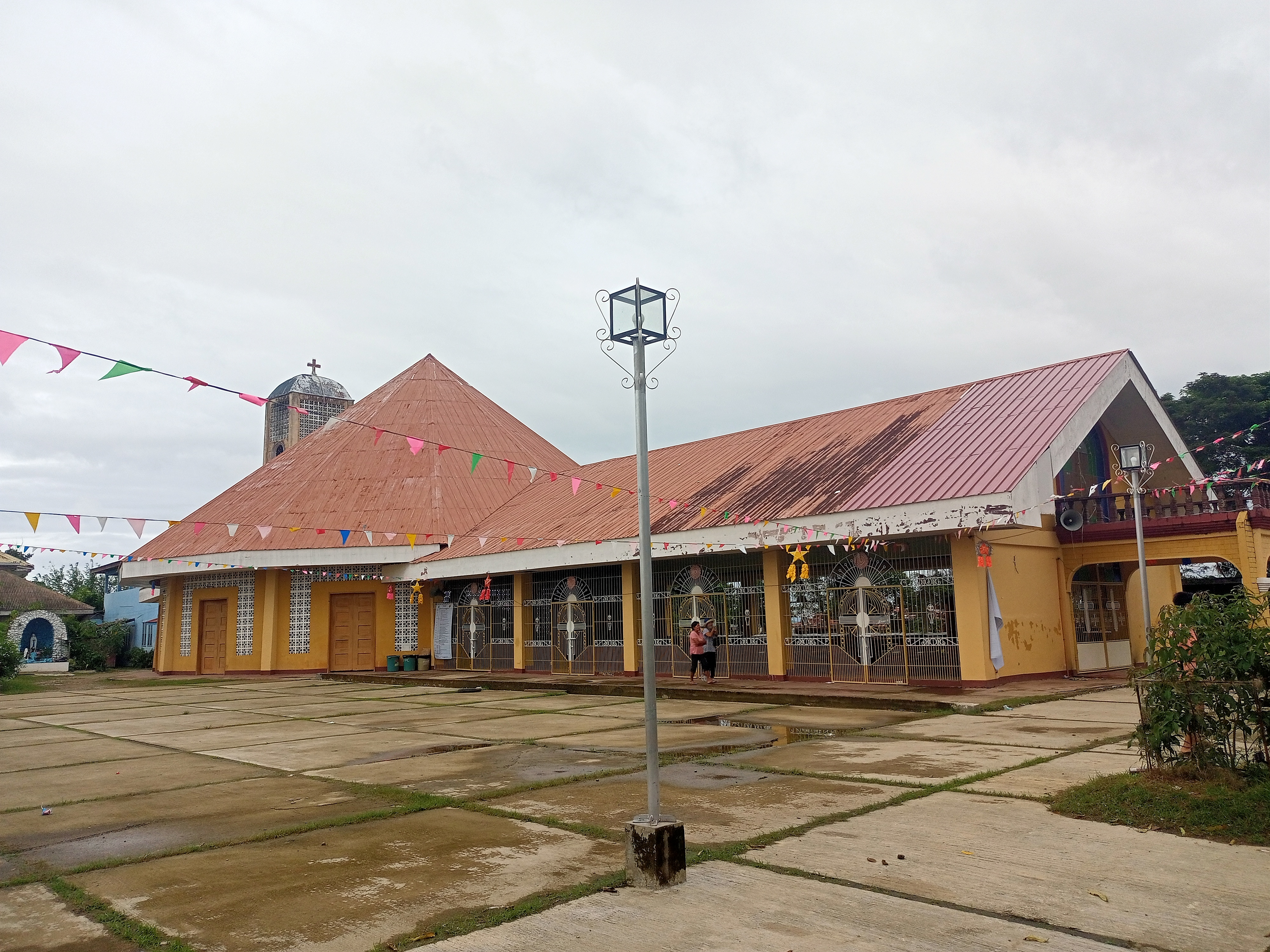
Roman Catholic Sto. Niño Parish Church

"Bien Unido" is a Spanish phrase translating to "well united" in English.

In 1935, two sitios in northern Trinidad were united into one barangay under an executive order and was given the name Bien Unido.

Then-Barangay Bien Unido had aspired to become a separate municipality since 1965. On December 24, 1980, Batas Pambansa Blg. 93 was passed, providing for the creation of the municipality of Bien Unido comprising the barangay of Bien Unido and certain surrounding barangays in the municipalities of Talibon and Trinidad. The creation of the municipality was approved by the majority of voters in a plebiscite on April 7, 1981.

On June 7, 2017, Gisela Bendong-Boniel, mayor of Bien Unido at that time, was kidnapped and killed, allegedly masterminded by her husband, Board Member Niño Rey Boniel, who was the former mayor of the town. Her body was dumped between the waters of Olango Island Group and Mactan. Her body has never been found.

== Geography ==
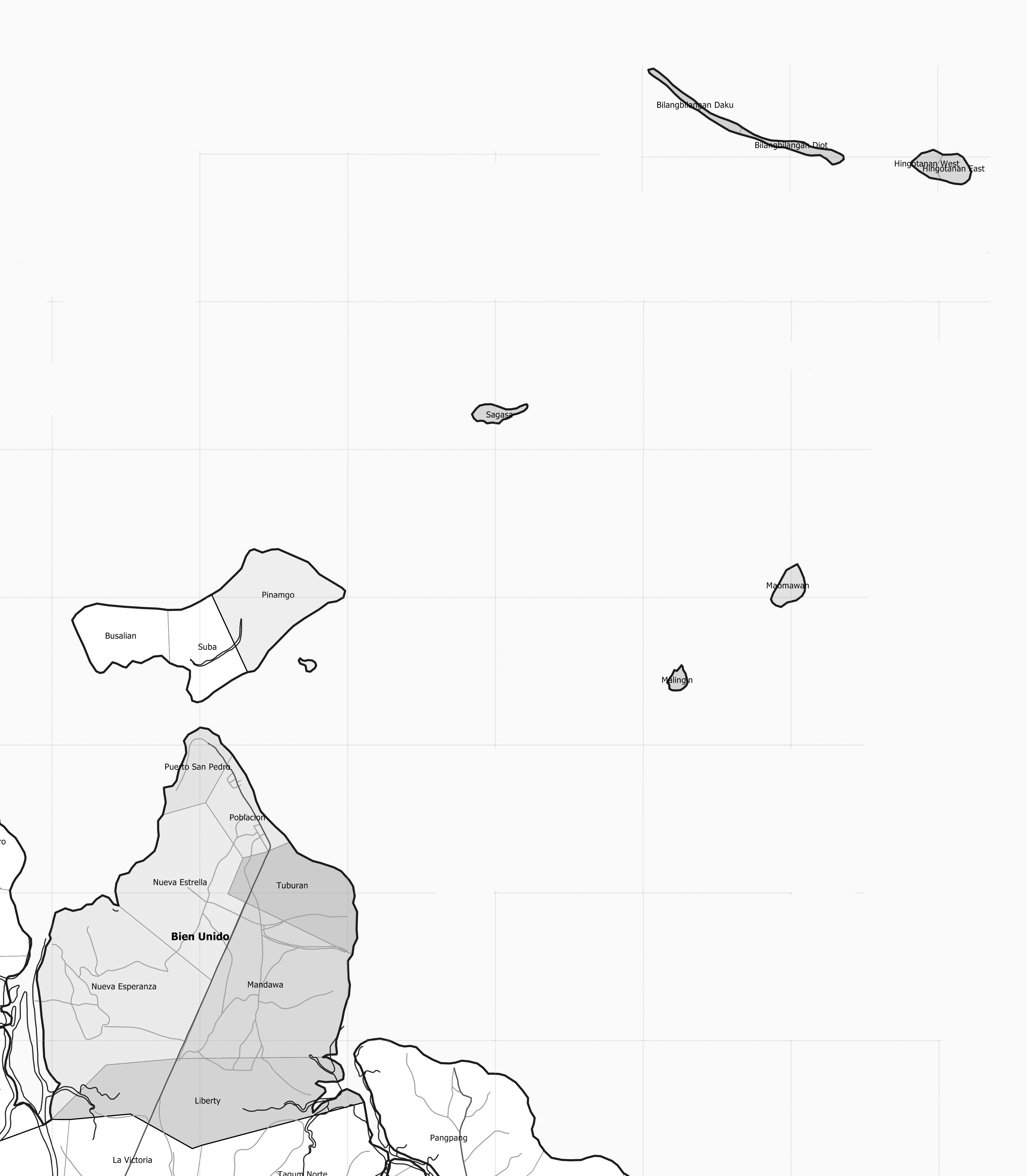
Map of Bien Unido showing barangays and islands

Bien Unido is located in the northern part of the island province of Bohol.

=== Barangays ===
Bien Unido is politically subdivided into 15 barangays. Each barangay consists of puroks and some have sitios.

Currently, only Barangays Bilangbilangan Diot and Hingotanan East are classified as rural and the rest are urban.

PSGC	Barangay	Population			±% p.a.	
		2024		2010		
071248001	Bilangbilangan Dako	7.5%	1,960	1,920	▴	0.14%
071248002	Bilangbilangan Diot	3.1%	818	845	▾	−0.23%
071248003	Hingotanan East	8.2%	2,143	2,283	▾	−0.44%
071248004	Hingotanan West	7.6%	1,986	1,665	▴	1.23%
071248005	Liberty	3.8%	998	843	▴	1.18%
071248006	Malingin	6.4%	1,691	1,997	▾	−1.15%
071248007	Mandawa	9.1%	2,385	2,328	▴	0.17%
071248008	Maomawan	6.4%	1,671	1,475	▴	0.87%
071248009	Nueva Esperanza	8.4%	2,205	2,527	▾	−0.94%
071248010	Nueva Estrella	6.2%	1,638	1,576	▴	0.27%
071248011	Pinamgo	8.9%	2,344	2,177	▴	0.52%
071248012	Poblacion (Bien Unido Proper)	12.5%	3,273	3,082	▴	0.42%
071248013	Puerto San Pedro (Lawis)	4.4%	1,144	1,137	▴	0.04%
071248014	Sagasa	5.6%	1,483	1,308	▴	0.88%
071248015	Tuboran	4.0%	1,054	955	▴	0.69%
	Total		26,278	25,796	▴	0.13%

=== Climate ===
Climate data for Bien Unido, Bohol
Month	Jan	Feb	Mar	Apr	May	Jun	Jul	Aug	Sep	Oct	Nov	Dec	Year
Mean daily maximum °C (°F)	28 (82)	28 (82)	29 (84)	31 (88)	31 (88)	30 (86)	30 (86)	30 (86)	30 (86)	29 (84)	29 (84)	28 (82)	29 (85)
Mean daily minimum °C (°F)	23 (73)	23 (73)	23 (73)	23 (73)	24 (75)	24 (75)	24 (75)	24 (75)	24 (75)	24 (75)	24 (75)	23 (73)	24 (74)
Average precipitation mm (inches)	98 (3.9)	82 (3.2)	96 (3.8)	71 (2.8)	104 (4.1)	129 (5.1)	101 (4.0)	94 (3.7)	99 (3.9)	135 (5.3)	174 (6.9)	143 (5.6)	1,326 (52.3)
Average rainy days	18.0	14.1	17.1	16.8	23.7	25.7	25.8	23.3	24.2	25.9	24.0	20.6	259.2
Source: Meteoblue

== Demographics ==
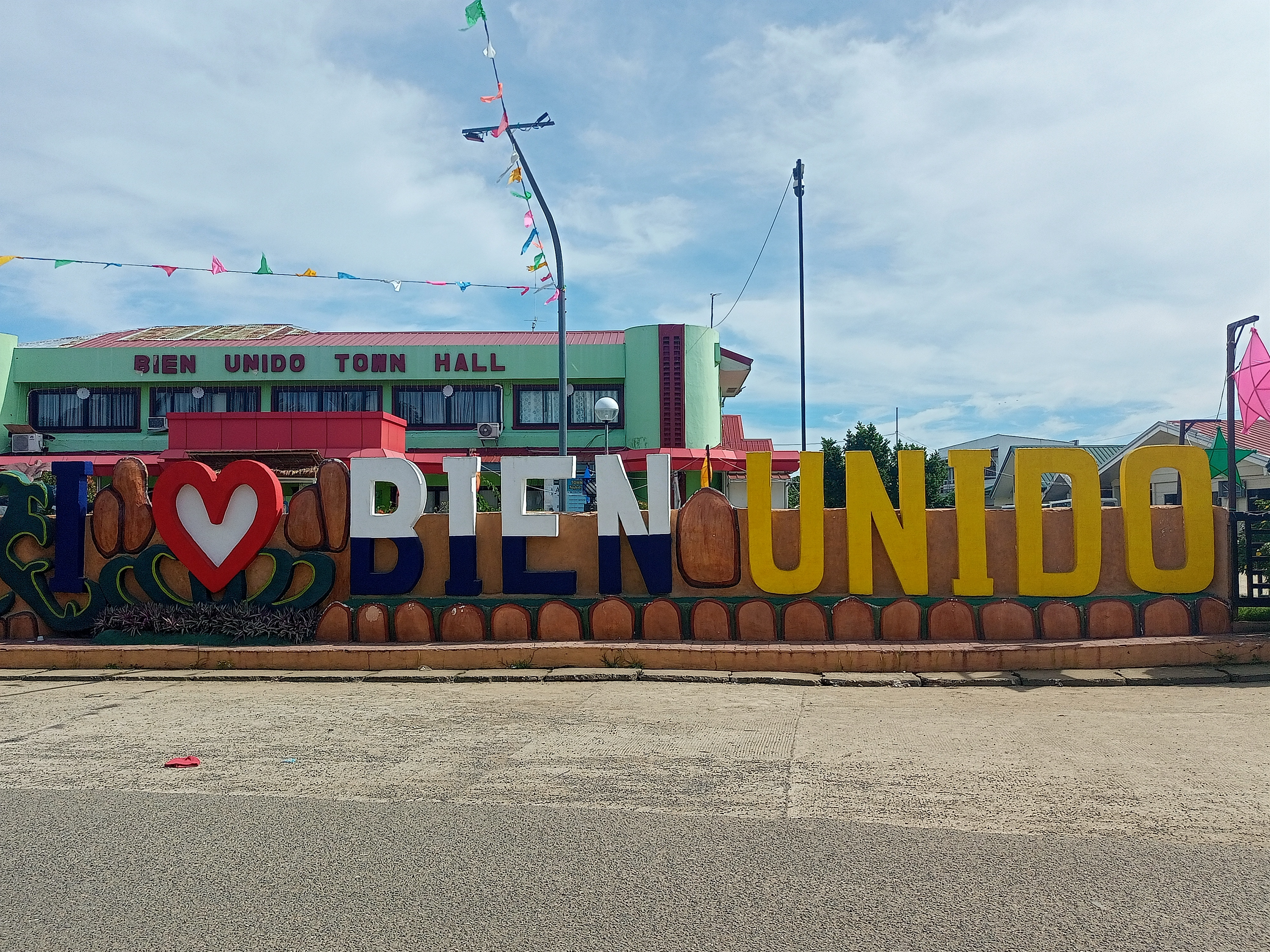
The "I Love Bien Unido" sign in Barangay Poblacion

Population census of Bien Unido
Year	Pop.	±% p.a.
1990	19,047	—
1995	19,185	+0.14%
2000	22,176	+3.15%
2007	23,412	+0.75%
2010	25,796	+3.59%
2015	27,115	+0.95%
2020	26,666	−0.35%
2024	26,278	−0.35%
Source: Philippine Statistics Authority

The people in the municipality speak Cebuano and the Boholano dialect. Filipino and English are generally understood.

== Economy ==
Poverty incidence of Bien Unido (%)

Source: Philippine Statistics Authority

Fishes caught are brought and sold in Cebu while mats have markets in Mindanao, Leyte and Cebu.

Seaweed industry is recently the main livelihood in the municipality. The farmed seaweeds are used as essential ingredient for gel capsules, soap, toothpaste, slippers and other plastic wares.

== Transportation ==
Bien Unido is 108 kilometres (67 mi) (2 hours or more) from Tagbilaran by road.

Cebu City is approximately over 4 hours via the Cebu–Talibon and Cebu–Tubigon RORO routes, while it takes 3 hours via the Cebu–Tubigon ferry (fastcraft) and over 2 hours via the Cebu–Talibon ferry (fastcraft).

Moreover, it takes approximately 2 or 3 hours to reach Bien Unido via the Cebu–Getafe ferry (fastcraft) or motor boat, while it takes 3 hours via the Cebu–Getafe RORO.

Bien Unido can also be reached directly from Cebu City through Pasil-Suba fish port via pump boat in more than 3 hours.

== Health and social services ==
- Number of Municipal Health Center: 1
- Number of Barangay Health Stations: 7
- Number of Day Care Centers: 15

== Education ==
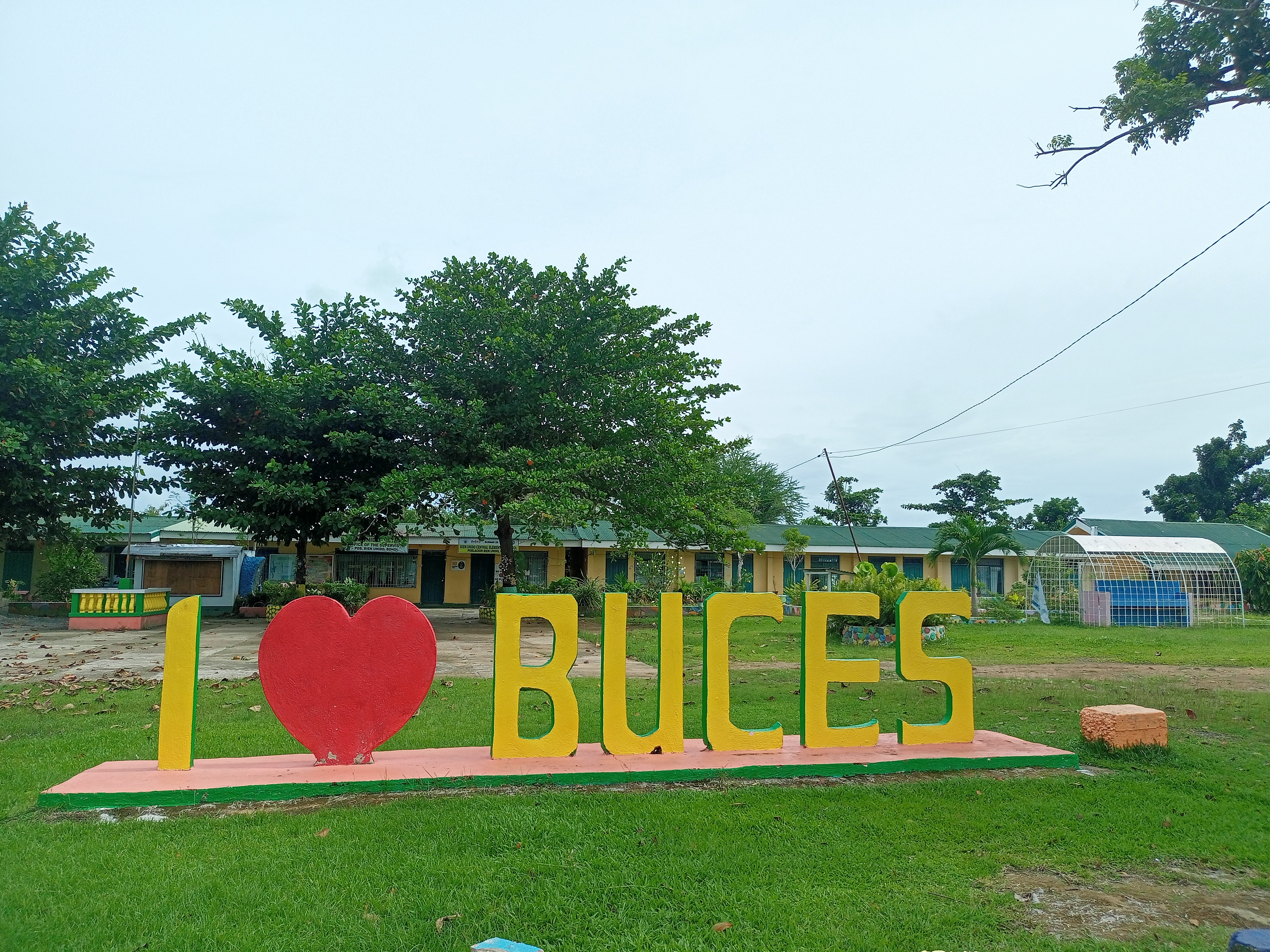
Bien Unido Central Elementary School (BUCES)

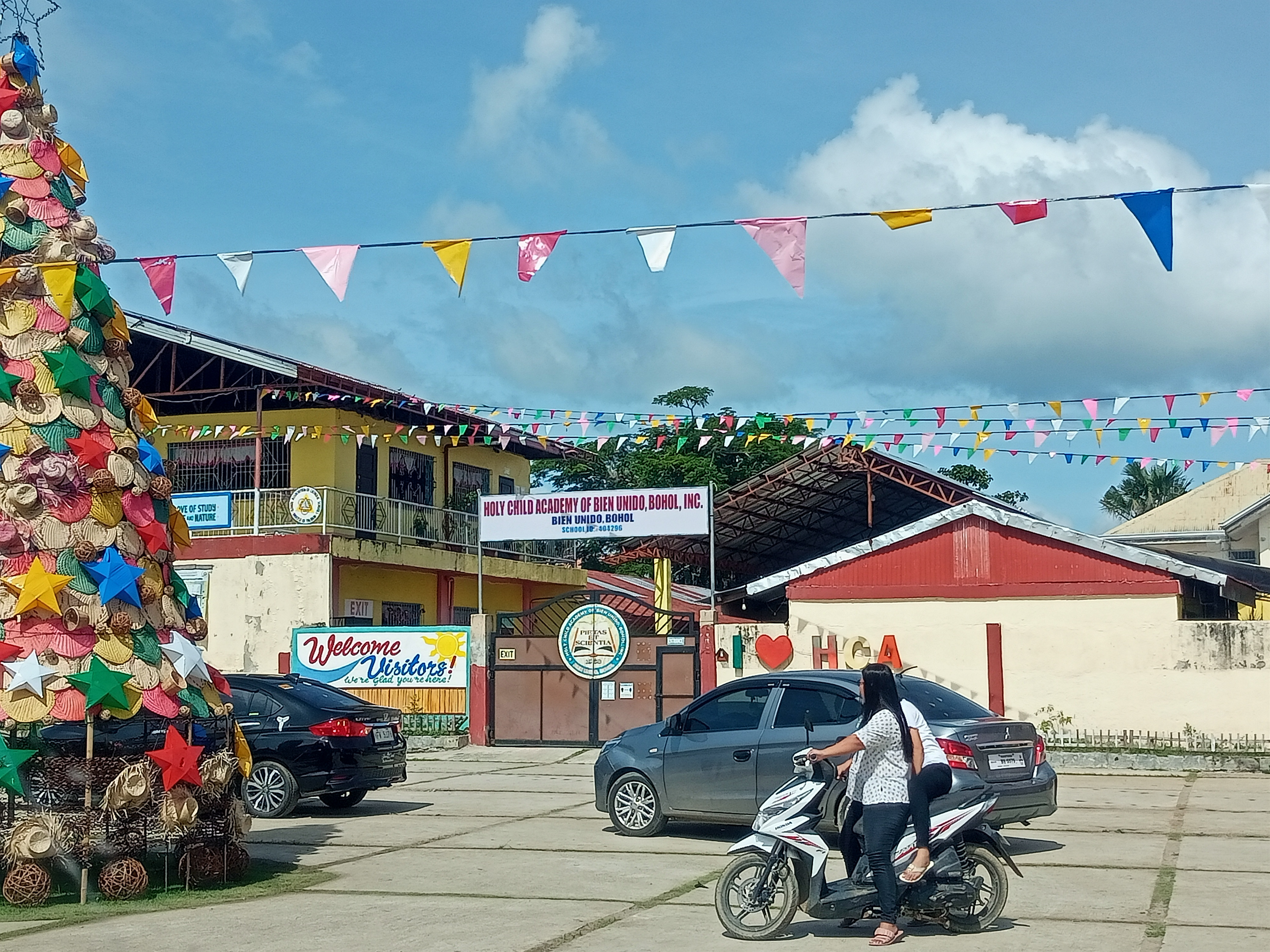
Holy Child Academy of Bien Unido, Bohol Inc. (HCABBI)

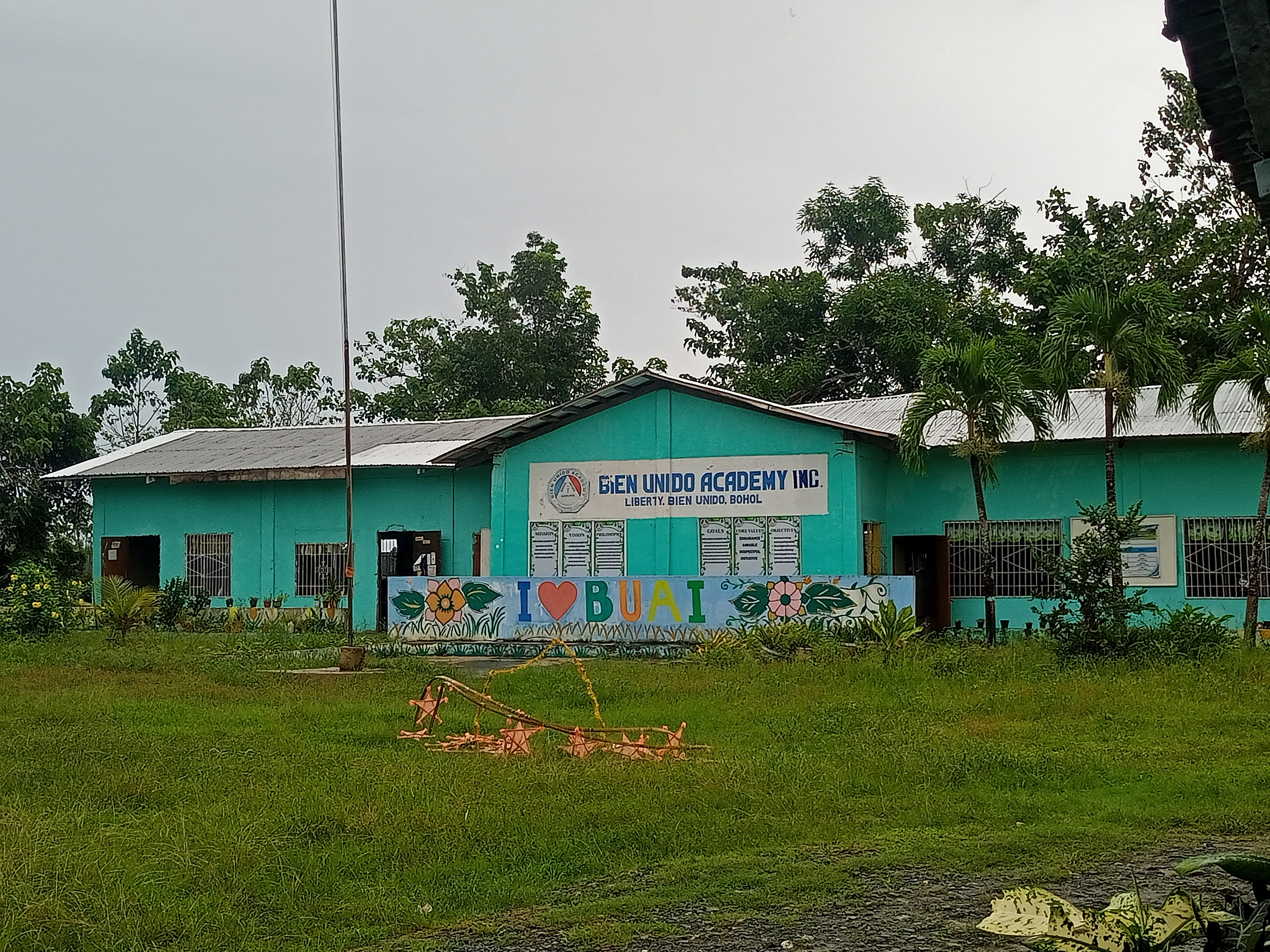
Bien Unido Academy Inc. (BUAI)

Secondary and High schools:

- Bien Unido Academy Inc. (Private)
- Holy Child Academy of Bien Unido, Bohol Inc. (Private)
- Hingotanan National High School
- Pres. Carlos P. Garcia Tech Voc School of Fisheries and Arts
- Ponciano L. Padin National High School
- Nueva Esperanza Integrated School

Elementary schools:

- Bien Unido Central Elementary School
- Bilangbilangan Daku Elementary School
- Hingotanan Elementary School
- Malingin Elementary School
- Mandawa Elementary School
- Maomawan Elementary School
- Montessori Educational Learning Centre of Ubay, Bien Unido Branch (Private)
- Nueva Esperanza Integrated School
- Nueva Estrella Elementary School
- Pinamgo Elementary School
- Sagasa Elementary School
