= Camotes Sea =

Small sea in the Philippine archipelago, bordered by the islands Leyte, Bohol and Cebu

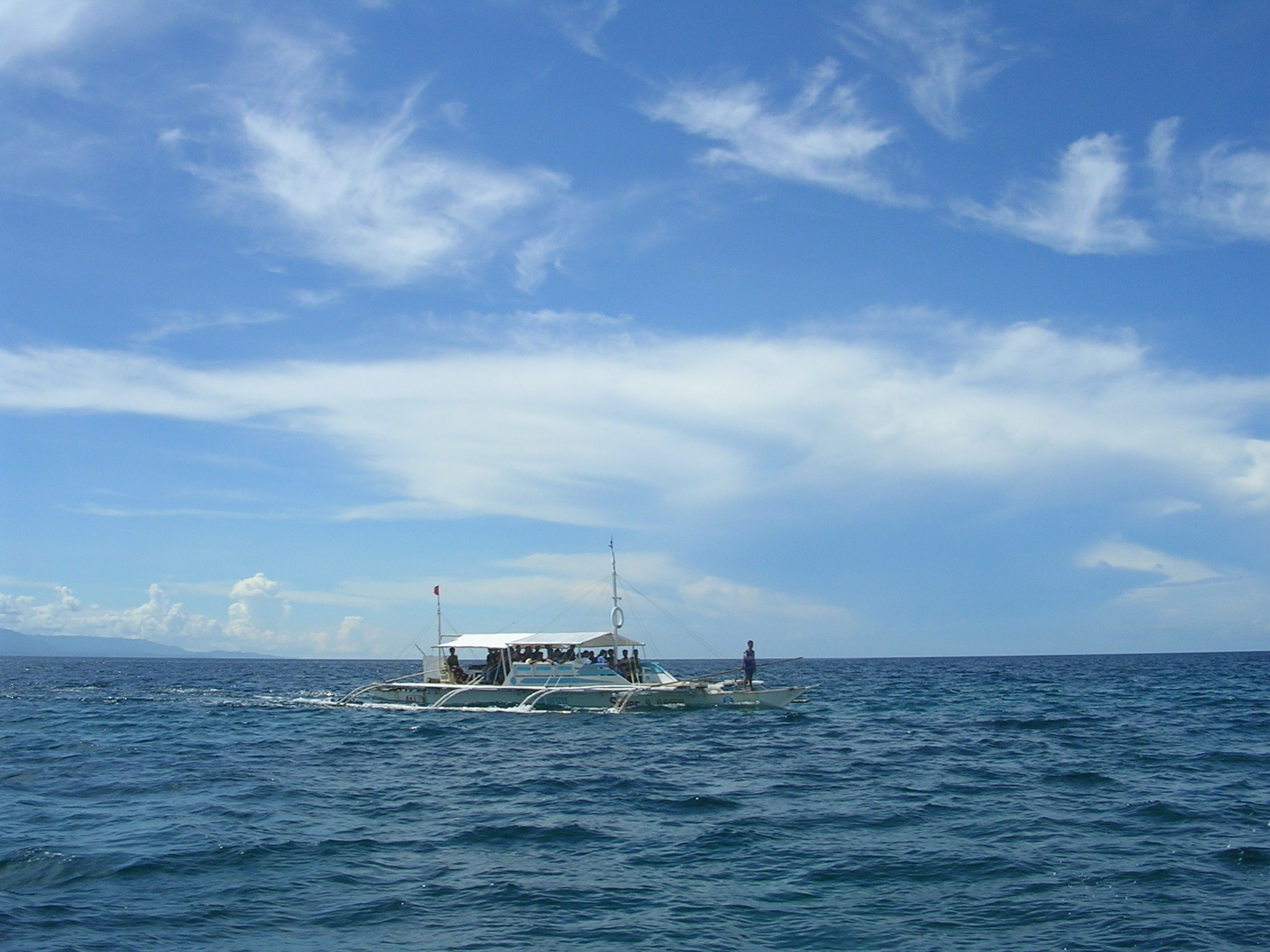
- An outrigger on the sea near Olango Island

- Location within the Philippines Camotes Sea (Philippines)
- Location: Visayas
- Coordinates: 10°30′0″N 124°20′0″E
- Type: sea
- Basin countries: Philippines
- Settlements: Baybay; Cebu City; Danao; Ormoc

The Camotes Sea is a small sea within the Philippine archipelago, situated between the Central Visayan and the Eastern Visayan regions. It separates Cebu from Leyte hence is bordered by Cebu to the west, Leyte to the east and north, and Bohol to the south. At its center are the Camotes Islands, but it also contains Mactan Island, Olango Island, Lapinig Island (in Bohol), and various other small islets.

Northwards, the sea is connected to the Visayan Sea. Southwards, it is connected to the Bohol Sea (also called the Mindanao Sea) in two ways: to the southwest by the Cebu Strait (and its three channels, the Mactan, the Olango, and the Hilutangan), and to the southeast by the Canigao Channel.

The Camotes Sea also contains the Danajon Bank, which is the only double barrier reef in the Philippines and the largest in the world. It comprises two sets of large coral reefs that formed offshore on a submarine ridge due to a combination of favorable tidal currents and coral growth in the area.

Antonio Pigafetta, a Spanish survivor of the Battle of Mactan, stayed on the Camotes Islands on his way to Cebu.

The sea is home to many species of fish, including sulu skate, ocean sunfish, mackerel, and great barracuda. Fish in the coral reefs include the families Acanthuridae and Tetraodontidae. The endangered white tip shark is also endemic to the Camotes Sea.

== See also ==
- Geography of the Visayas — the central island group of the Philippines.
- Cebu Strait — the strait between the islands of Cebu and Bohol, which connects the Camotes Sea to the Bohol Sea (west part).
- Canigao Channel — the strait between the islands of Bohol and Leyte, which connects the Camotes Sea to the Bohol Sea (east part).
- Danajon Bank — the only double barrier reef of the Philippines.
- Silot Bay — bay in Liloan, Cebu connected to the sea.
