= 2016 Bohol local elections =

Philippine election

2016 Bohol gubernatorial election
- May 9, 2016
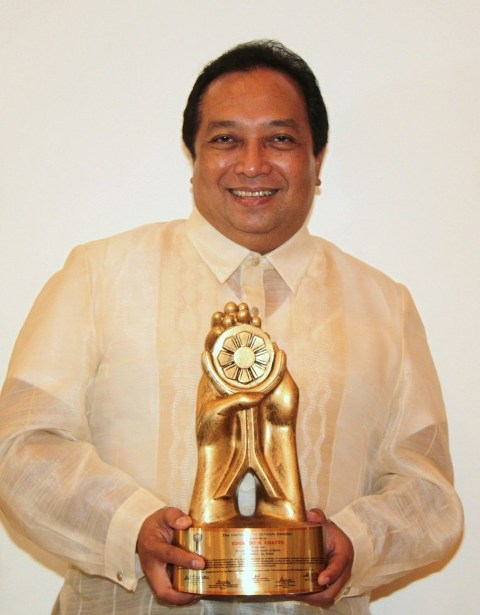
Nominee	Edgar Chatto	Rosemarie Lim-Imboy	Wenceslao Garcia
Party	Liberal	PDP–Laban	LM
Running mate	Concepcion Lim	Dionisio Balite
Popular vote	332,855	223,190	9,939
Percentage	58.42%	39.17%	1.74%
Nominee	Kary Balagosa	Cipriano Gaudicos
Party	Independent	KBL
Popular vote	2,527	1,299
Percentage	0.44%	0.23%
Governor before election
Edgar Chatto
Liberal
Elected Governor
Edgar Chatto
Liberal

Local elections were held in Bohol on May 9, 2016, as part of the 2016 Philippine general election. Registered voters elected leaders for local positions: a city or town mayor, vice mayor and town councilors, as well as three to four members of the Sangguniang Panlalawigan, the vice-governor, governor and three representatives for the three districts of Bohol.

By the end of voters' registration last October 2015, the total number of registered voters in Bohol is 798,768. There is 2.96% or equivalent to 22,983 increase in the number of voters registered from 775,785 voter population last 2013.

37 hopefuls filed their certificates of candidacy (COC) for 15 provincial elective positions in time for the deadline for the filing of certificates of candidacy on October 16, 2012. Based on the official list of provincial Commission on Elections, 5 aspirants run for governor, 2 for vice-governors, 23 for provincial board members, and 7 for congressman in three districts. Also in the whole province, there 104 candidates for mayor, 103 aspirants are vying for vice mayor, and 812 bets for municipal or city councilor.

== Provincial Election Results ==
=== Governor ===
Edgar Chatto is the incumbent. He won by landslide for his third consecutive term as governor.

Bohol gubernatorial election
Party	Candidate	Votes	%
Liberal	Edgar Chatto	332,855	58.42%
PDP–Laban	Rosemarie Lim-Imboy	223,190	39.17%
LM	Wenceslao Garcia	9,939	1.74%
Independent	Kary Balagosa	2,527	0.44%
KBL	Cipriano Gaudicos	1,299	0.23%
Total votes		569,810	100.00%
Liberal hold			

=== Vice-Governor ===
Atty. Dionisio D. Balite, a seasoned public servant whose political career spans fifty years starting out as town councilor and then municipal mayor of his hometown of Valencia, is the newly elected Vice-Governor of Bohol. Balite had served several terms as Senior Board Member of the Sangguniang Panlalawigan (SP). He had one more term left in the SP, when he decided it was time to vie for the vice-governorship. Up until then, the incumbent Vice-Governor did not face any strong contender for the position.

Bohol vice-gubernatorial election
Party	Candidate	Votes	%
PDP–Laban	Dionisio Balite	278,489	51.94%
Liberal	Concepcion Lim	257,710	48.06%
Total votes		536,199	100.00%
PDP–Laban gain from Liberal			

=== Sangguniang Panlalawigan ===
==== 1st District ====
- Voter Population (2016): 268,381

Parties are as stated in their certificates of candidacy. Christopher Bangalao and Manuelito Bama-at both of PDP–Laban withdrew their candidacies.

Bohol 1st District Sangguniang Panlalawigan election
Party	Candidate	Votes	%
Liberal	Venzencio Arcamo	113,164	29.71%
Liberal	Abeleon Damalerio	106,173	27.87%
Liberal	Ricky Masamayor	87,885	23.07%
PDP–Laban	Donald Sevilla^{1}	59,806	15.70%
Independent	Jose Mesina	13,919	3.65%
Total votes		380,947	100.00%

^1 Substituted Dante Salva (PDP–Laban).

==== 2nd District ====
- Voter Population (2016): 257,827

Parties are as stated in their certificates of candidacy.

Bohol 2nd District Sangguniang Panlalawigan election
Party	Candidate	Votes	%
NPC	Tomas Abapo Jr.	85,834	23.44%
Nacionalista	Niño Rey Boniel	66,961	18.29%
Liberal	Agapito Avenido	52,880	14.44%
Liberal	Giehrjem Puracan	52,037	14.21%
Liberal	Jonel Torregosa	51,139	13.97%
NPC	Antonio Ouano Jr.	47,199	12.89%
Independent	Santos Abella	10,091	2.76%
Total votes		366,141	100.00%

==== 3rd District ====
- Voter Population (2016): 272,560

Parties are as stated in their certificates of candidacy.

Bohol 3rd District Sangguniang Panlalawigan election
Party	Candidate	Votes	%
Liberal	Kristine Alexie Tutor	113,210	19.07%
PDP–Laban	Dionisio Victor Balite	100,315	16.90%
Liberal	Jane Jade Bautista	95,684	16.12%
Liberal	Elpidio Jala	81,482	13.73%
PDP–Laban	Nathaniel Binlod^{2}	65,653	11.06%
PDP–Laban	Godofreda Tirol	60,976	10.27%
Liberal	Sancho Bernales	46,501	7.83%
PDP–Laban	Noel Bongolto	22,491	3.79%
LM	Laureano Omac	7,328	1.23%
Total votes		593,640	100.00%

^2 Replaced Porferio Datoy after withdrawing candidacy.

== Congressional Election Results ==
=== 1st District, Congressman ===
- City: Tagbilaran City
- Municipality: Alburquerque, Antequera, Baclayon, Balilihan, Calape, Catigbian, Corella, Cortes, Dauis, Loon, Maribojoc, Panglao, Sikatuna, Tubigon
- Population (2010): 415,420

Rene Relampagos is the incumbent.

Philippine House of Representatives election at Bohol's 1st district
Party	Candidate	Votes	%
Liberal	Rene Relampagos	144,284	79.53%
UNA	Joahna Cabalit-Initay	27,769	15.31%
PDP–Laban	Cresencio Alturas	9,378	5.17%
Total votes		181,431	100.00%
Liberal hold			

=== 2nd District, Congressman ===
- City: none
- Municipality: Bien Unido, Buenavista, Clarin, Dagohoy, Danao, Getafe, Inabanga, Pres. Carlos P. Garcia, Sagbayan, San Isidro, San Miguel, Talibon, Trinidad, Ubay
- Population (2010): 415,878

Erico Aristotle Aumentado is the incumbent.

Philippine House of Representatives election at Bohol's 2nd district
Party	Candidate	Votes	%
NPC	Erico Aristotle Aumentado	134,297	72.91%
NUP	Gerardo Garcia	49,895	27.09%
Total votes		211,011	100.00%
NPC hold			

=== 3rd District, Congressman ===
- City: none
- Municipality: Alicia, Anda, Batuan, Bilar, Candijay, Carmen, Dimiao, Duero, Garcia Hernandez, Guindulman, Jagna, Lila, Loay, Loboc, Mabini, Pilar, Sevilla, Sierra Bullones, Valencia
- Population (2010): 423,830

Arthur Yap is the incumbent. He is vying for his third and last term as congressman. Former Carmen mayor Conchita Toribio-delos Reyes challenged him for the seat. This is also the first time that Yap is running with an opponent.

Philippine House of Representatives election at Bohol's 3rd district
Party	Candidate	Votes	%
NPC	Arthur Yap	121,093	57.39%
PDP–Laban	Conchita Toribio-delos Reyes	89,918	42.61%
Total votes		211,011	100.00%
NPC hold			

== City and Municipal Election Results ==
All municipalities of Bohol and Tagbilaran City elected mayor, vice-mayor and councilors this election. The mayor and vice mayor with the highest number of votes win the seat; they are voted separately, therefore, they may be of different parties when elected. Below is the list of Mayoral and vice-Mayoral candidates of each city and municipalities in three districts.

=== First District ===
Parties are as stated in their certificates of candidacy.

==== Tagbilaran City ====
- Voter Population (2016): 59,949

John Geesnell Yap and Jose Antonio Veloso are the incumbent mayor and vice-mayor, running for reelection.

Tagbilaran City Mayoral Election
Party	Candidate	Votes	%
Liberal	John Geesnell Yap II	39,390	83.20%
PMP	Arlene Karaan	7,481	15.80%
Independent	Edgardo Kapirig	468	0.98%
Total votes		47,339	100.00%

Tagbilaran City Vice Mayoral Election
Party	Candidate	Votes	%
Liberal	Jose Antonio Veloso	37,164	92.13%
Independent	Alfred Hontanosas	3,173	7.86%
Total votes		40,337	100.0%
Liberal hold			

==== Alburquerque ====
- Voter Population (2016): 6,698

Efren Tungol and Cayetano Doria Jr. are the incumbents. Tungol withdrew his candidacy before the deadline last December 10, 2015 and nominated his youngest son Alfren Charles Tungol as a mayoral candidate under LP. On the other hand, incumbent vice-mayor Cayetano Doria Jr. is running unopposed.

Alburquerque Mayoral Election
Party	Candidate	Votes	%
Liberal	Alfren Charles Tungol^{3}	3,152	59.46%
PDP–Laban	Eugenio Salibay	2,149	40.53%
Total votes		5,301	100.00%

^3 Substituted his father, incumbent mayor Efren Tungol (LP).

Alburquerque Vice Mayoral Election
Party	Candidate	Votes	%
Liberal	Cayetano Doria Jr.	4,186	100.00%
Total votes		4,186	100.00%

==== Antequera ====
- Voter Population (2016): 8,691

Antequera Mayoral Election
Party	Candidate	Votes	%
Liberal	Jose Mario Pahang	5,043	69.81%
Independent	Samuel Rebosura	2,180	30.18%
Total votes		7,223	100.00%

Antequera Vice Mayoral Election
Party	Candidate	Votes	%
Liberal	Simon Leo Jadulco	3,715	52.83%
PDP–Laban	Lanibel Moncayo-Labado	3,316	47.16%
Total votes		7,031	100.00%

==== Baclayon ====
- Voter Population (2016): 12,166

Baclayon Mayoral Election
Party	Candidate	Votes	%
Liberal	Benecio Uy	5,272	50.67%
Nacionalista	Jodel Theodore Cabahug	5,132	49.32%
Total votes		10,404	100.00%

Baclayon Vice Mayoral Election
Party	Candidate	Votes	%
Nacionalista	Romulo Balangkig	5,006	50.12%
Liberal	Ma. Judith Buhion-Israel	4,982	49.87%
Total votes		9,988	100.00%

==== Balilihan ====
Incumbent Mayor and Bohol First Lady Pureza Veloso-Chatto is seeking her first full term. Elected as vice mayor in 2013, Veloso-Chatto assumed the mayorship upon the death of then Mayor Dominisio "Domie" Chatto on July 23, 2015. Her running mate is former first councilor and incumbent Vice Mayor Edgar Asilo, who assumed the vice mayorship as provided by law.

- Voter Population (2016): 11,556

Balilihan Mayoral Election
Party	Candidate	Votes	%
Liberal	Maria Pureza Veloso-Chatto	7,237	87.62%
Independent	Mark Leo Monton	1,022	12.37%
Total votes		8,259	100.00%

Balilihan Vice Mayoral Election
Party	Candidate	Votes	%
Independent	Adonis Roy Olalo	5,025	54.03%
Liberal	Edgar Asilo	4,275	45.96%
Total votes		9,300	100.00%

==== Calape ====
- Voter Population (2016): 20,449

Incumbent mayor Sulpicio Yu Jr. is running for vice-mayor unopposed. He switched with his brother, incumbent vice-mayor Nelson Yu who is now vying for mayor of the town.

Calape Mayoral Election
Party	Candidate	Votes	%
Liberal	Nelson Yu	11,986	80.28%
UNA	Delia Resusta-Dumalag	2,092	14.01%
Independent	Vicente Yu	851	5.7%
Total votes		14,929	100.00%

Calape Vice Mayoral Election
Party	Candidate	Votes	%
Liberal	Sulpicio Yu Jr.	12,792	100.00%
Total votes		12,792	100.00%

==== Catigbian ====
- Voter Population (2016): 13,832

Catigbian Mayoral Election
Party	Candidate	Votes	%
Liberal	Virgilio Lurot	5,978	54.30%
Independent	Fortunato Concon	5,030	45.69%
Total votes		11,008	100.00%

Catigbian Vice Mayoral Election
Party	Candidate	Votes	%
Independent	Necita Napiñas-Digaum	6,489	60.61%
Liberal	Reynald Lacea	4,216	39.38%
Total votes		10,705	100.00%

==== Corella ====
Jose Nicanor Tocmo and Maria Asuncion Banal-Daquio are the incumbent mayor and vice mayor, all vying for reelection.

- Voter Population (2016): 5,140

Corella Mayoral Election
Party	Candidate	Votes	%
UNA	Jose Nicanor Tocmo	2,071	46.95%
Liberal	Danilo Bandala	1,750	39.67%
PDP–Laban	Fabio Ontong Jr.	487	11.04%
Independent	Epifanio Bolando	103	2.33%
Total votes		4,411	100.00%

Corella Vice Mayoral Election
Party	Candidate	Votes	%
UNA	Maria Asuncion Banal-Daquio	1,994	47.06%
Independent	Vito Rapal	1,549	36.55%
Liberal	Rex Romani Tocmo^{4}	513	12.10%
PDP–Laban	Vanessa Clarin-Macarayan	112	2.64%
Independent	Nicanor Lumain	69	1.62%
Total votes		4,237	100.00%

^4 Substituted Cecilia Salang-Daquio (LP), who earlier withdrew her candidacy.

==== Cortes ====
- Voter Population (2016): 10,566

Roberto Tabanera is the incumbent. He was challenged by the incumbent vice-mayor Lynn Iven Paña-Lim.

Cortes Mayoral Election
Party	Candidate	Votes	%
Liberal	Lynn Iven Paña-Lim	6,408	74.01%
Independent	Roberto Tabanera	2,250	25.98%
Total votes		8,658	100.00%

Cortes Vice Mayoral Election
Party	Candidate	Votes	%
Independent	Leo Pabutoy	4,580	53.27%
Liberal	Romeo Labor	4,017	46.72%
Total votes		8,597	100.00%

==== Dauis ====
- Voter Population (2016): 26,470

Marietta Tocmo-Sumaylo and Luciano Bongalos are the incumbent mayor and vice-mayor, all running for reelection.

Dauis Mayoral Election
Party	Candidate	Votes	%
Liberal	Marietta Tocmo-Sumaylo	13,703	62.43%
PDP–Laban	Victorio Migriño	8,245	37.56%
Total votes		21,948	100.00%

Dauis Vice Mayoral Election
Party	Candidate	Votes	%
Liberal	Luciano Bongalos	13,630	68.00%
PDP–Laban	Jobert Bomediano^{5}	6,413	31.99%
Total votes		20,043	100.00%

^5 Substituted Renaldo Yana (PDP–Laban), who withdrew his candidacy.

==== Loon ====
- Voter Population (2016): 27,676

Incumbent mayor Lloyd Peter Lopez is now running for vice-mayor in exchange with incumbent vice-mayor Elvi Peter Relampagos, who is vying for mayor of the town.

Loon Mayoral Election
Party	Candidate	Votes	%
Liberal	Elvi Peter Relampagos	15,894	70.36%
UNA	Ana Lisa Orcullo-Go	6,693	29.63%
Total votes		22,587	100.00%

Loon Vice Mayoral Election
Party	Candidate	Votes	%
Liberal	Lloyd Peter Lopez	16,255	73.14%
Independent	Damaso Pasilbas	3,590	16.15%
Independent	Wilfredo Caresosa	2,378	10.70%
Total votes		22,223	100.00%

==== Maribojoc ====
- Voter Population (2016): 12,753

Maribojoc Mayoral Election
Party	Candidate	Votes	%
Liberal	Gumersindo Arocha	5,809	53.92%
Nacionalista	Fructuoso Redulla Jr.	4,937	45.82%
Independent	Henry Cantoneros	27	27
Total votes		10,773	100.00%

Maribojoc Vice Mayoral Election
Party	Candidate	Votes	%
Liberal	Jose Veloso	5,553	54.25%
Nacionalista	Andresa Escabarte-Pohl	4,682	45.74%
Total votes		10,235	100.00%

==== Panglao ====
- Voter Population (2016): 21,394

Panglao Mayoral Election
Party	Candidate	Votes	%
Liberal	Leonila Paredes-Montero	9,409	51.13%
PDP–Laban	Doloreich Dumaluan	8,991	48.86%
Total votes		18,400	100.00%

Panglao Vice Mayoral Election
Party	Candidate	Votes	%
Liberal	Pedro Fuertes	10,148	56.67%
Independent	Benedicto Alcala	7,758	43.32%
Total votes		17,906	100.00%

==== Sikatuna ====
- Voter Population (2016): 4,647

Incumbent mayor Jose Ellorimo Jr. is running unopposed. His vice-mayor, Julian Manigo is also vying for reelection.

Sikatuna Mayoral Election
Party	Candidate	Votes	%
Liberal	Jose Ellorimo Jr.	3,349	100.00%
Total votes		3,349	100.00%
Liberal hold			

Sikatuna Vice Mayoral Election
Party	Candidate	Votes	%
Liberal	Julian Manigo	1,957	53.36%
UNA	Silverio Palgan	1,710	46.63%
Total votes		3,667	100.00%

==== Tubigon ====
- Voter Population (2016): 26,394

Tubigon Mayoral Election
Party	Candidate	Votes	%
Liberal	William Richard Jao	11,390	50.96%
UNA	Marlon Amila	10,959	49.03%
Total votes		22,349	100.00%

Tubigon Vice Mayoral Election
Party	Candidate	Votes	%
Liberal	Virgilio Fortich	12,069	56.16%
UNA	Everardeen Flores	9,420	43.83%
Total votes		21,489	100.00%

=== Second District ===
Parties are as stated in their certificates of candidacy.

==== Bien Unido ====
Incumbent Niño Rey Boniel is on his third term and is ineligible to run. He is running for 2nd District board member His wife, Gisela Bendong-Boniel is running in his place.

- Voter Population (2016): 15,858

Bien Unido Mayoral Election
Party	Candidate	Votes	%
NPC	Gisela Bendong-Boniel	6,729	56.06%
Liberal	Joselyn Pepito-Villarias	4,806	40.03%
Independent	Verlito Paredes	237	1.97%
Independent	Jesus Esma Jr.	231	1.92%
Total votes		12,003	100.00%

Rene Borenaga is the incumbent.

Bien Unido Vice Mayoral Election
Party	Candidate	Votes	%
NPC	Rene Borenaga	7,091	67.02%
Liberal	Petronilo Justiniane	2,477	23.41%
Independent	Bernardino Garcia	1,011	9.55%
Total votes		10,579	100.00%

==== Buenavista ====
- Voter Population (2016): 16,813

Buenavista Mayoral Election
Party	Candidate	Votes	%
UNA	Ronald Lowell Tirol	9,617	76.49%
Liberal	Roseller Bañez	2,955	23.50%
Total votes		12,572	100.00%

Buenavista Vice Mayoral Election
Party	Candidate	Votes	%
UNA	Dave Duallo	8,458	74.71%
Liberal	Agustin Estorgio	2,863	25.28%
Total votes		11,321	100.00%

==== Clarin ====
- Voter Population (2016): 13,743

Incumbent Allen Ray Piezas is running for reelection while his vice mayor, Velden Aparicio is unopposed.

Clarin Mayoral Election
Party	Candidate	Votes	%
Liberal	Allen Ray Piezas	6,129	52.53%
UNA	Eugeniano Ibarra	5,537	47.46%
Total votes		11,666	100.00%

Clarin Vice Mayoral Election
Party	Candidate	Votes	%
Liberal	Velden Aparicio	7,186	100.00%
Total votes		7,186	100.00%

==== Dagohoy ====
- Voter Population (2016): 11,228

Dagohoy Mayoral Election
Party	Candidate	Votes	%
NPC	Sofronio Apat	5,508	60.34%
Liberal	Roel Lagroma	3,620	39.65%
Total votes		9,128	100.00%

Dagohoy Vice Mayoral Election
Party	Candidate	Votes	%
NPC	Ma. Shirley Abulag-Amodia	5,036	56.09%
Liberal	Andres Ampoloquio	3,942	43.90%
Total votes		8,978	100.00%

==== Danao ====
- Voter Population (2016): 12,212

Incumbent mayor Natividad Gonzaga is not running. Her son, incumbent vice-mayor Louis Thomas Gonzaga is running for mayor unopposed. However, the latter Gonzaga died on May 6, 2016, 3 days before election at age 46. Incumbent mayor Natividad Gonzaga is expected to substitute on her son's vacated seat.

Danao Mayoral Election
Party	Candidate	Votes	%
UNA	Louis Thomas Gonzaga	5,425	100.00%
Total votes		5,425	100.00%

Danao Vice Mayoral Election
Party	Candidate	Votes	%
Liberal	Jose Cepedoza	5,392	56.88%
UNA	Lirio Vitor	4,086	43.11%
Total votes		9,478	100.00%

==== Getafe ====
- Voter Population (2016): 18,576

Incumbent mayor Casey Shaun Camacho is running for reelection unopposed. Incumbent vice mayor Eduardo Torremocha is also vying for reelection.

Getafe Mayoral Election
Party	Candidate	Votes	%
UNA	Casey Shaun Camacho	11,360	100.00%
Total votes		11,360	100.00%

Getafe Vice Mayoral Election
Party	Candidate	Votes	%
UNA	Eduardo Torremocha	7,627	58.07%
Liberal	Dennis Torrenueva	5,506	41.92%
Total votes		13,133	100.00%

==== Inabanga ====
- Voter Population (2016): 25,979

Inabanga Mayoral Election
Party	Candidate	Votes	%
Liberal	Josephine Socorro Ching-Jumamoy	13,634	64.55%
UNA	Concepcion Cabatingan-Muneses	7,486	35.44%
Total votes		21,120	100.00%

Inabanga Vice Mayoral Election
Party	Candidate	Votes	%
Liberal	Rodrigo Jumamoy	13,187	68.63%
UNA	David Perejan Jr.	6,027	31.36%
Total votes		19,214	100.00%

==== Pres. Carlos P. Garcia ====
- Voter Population (2016): 14,455

Pres. Carlos P. Garcia Mayoral Election
Party	Candidate	Votes	%
Liberal	Fernando Estavilla	7,424	67.28%
NPC	Nestor Abad	3,609	32.71%
Total votes		11,033	100.00%

Pres. Carlos P. Garcia Vice Mayoral Election
Party	Candidate	Votes	%
Liberal	Renato Sente	5,693	55.06%
NPC	Vicente Cutamora	4,646	44.93%
Total votes		10,339	100.00%

==== Sagbayan ====
- Voter Population (2016): 14,394

Incumbent mayor Ricardo Suarez is seeking reelection unopposed. Incumbent vice-mayor Charito Piezas-Lao is running for reelection.

Sagbayan Mayoral Election
Party	Candidate	Votes	%
Liberal	Ricardo Suarez	8,944	100.00%
Total votes		8,944	100.00%

Sagbayan Vice Mayoral Election
Party	Candidate	Votes	%
Liberal	Charito Piezas-Lao	7,031	67.97%
UNA	Jimmy Torrefranca^{6}	3,312	32.02%
Total votes		10,343	100.00%

^6Substituted Desiree Grace Lapatan-Amores (UNA), who earlier withdrew her candidacy.

==== San Isidro ====
- Voter Population (2016): 6,509

San Isidro Mayoral Election
Party	Candidate	Votes	%
NPC	Jacinto Naraga	3,391	62.39%
Liberal	Doxson Asoy	2,044	37.60%
Total votes		5,435	100.00%

San Isidro Vice Mayoral Election
Party	Candidate	Votes	%
UNA	Filemon Mantabote	3,280	61.29%
Liberal	Jorge Cosmod	2,071	38.70%
Total votes		5,351	100.00%

==== San Miguel ====
- Voter Population (2016): 14,040

Incumbent mayor Claudio C. Bonior is ineligible for reelection due to term-limits. His party nominated incumbent vice-mayor Jonathan Reyes for mayor. On the other hand, incumbent first councilor Faustino Bulaga is vying for vice-mayor unopposed.

San Miguel Mayoral Election
Party	Candidate	Votes	%
Liberal	Nunila Mendez-Pinat	7,399	63.77%
NPC	Jonathan Reyes	4,202	36.22%
Total votes		11,601	100.00%

San Miguel Vice Mayoral Election
Party	Candidate	Votes	%
Independent	Faustino Bulaga	10,071	100.00%
Total votes		10,071	100.00%

==== Talibon ====
- Voter Population (2016): 33,211

Talibon Mayoral Election
Party	Candidate	Votes	%
Liberal	Restituto Auxtero	12,901	48.82%
UNA	Epifanio Quimson	11,895	45.01%
LM	Carlito Evangelista	1,629	6.16%
Total votes		26,425	100.00%

Talibon Vice Mayoral Election
Party	Candidate	Votes	%
NPC	Cleto Garcia	12,452	52.13%
Liberal	Nomie Turtoga-Valmoria	11,431	47.86%
Total votes		23,883	100.00%

==== Trinidad ====
- Voter Population (2016): 19,017

Trinidad Mayoral Election
Party	Candidate	Votes	%
Liberal	Judith del Rosario-Cajes	9,868	64.56%
LM	Filadelfo Garcia	5,417	35.43%
Total votes		15,285	100.00%

Trinidad Vice Mayoral Election
Party	Candidate	Votes	%
Liberal	Manuel Garcia	9,290	64.54%
UNA	Pablo Otara	4,870	33.83%
Independent	Zacarias Ibaoc	232	1.61%
Total votes		14,392	100.00%

==== Ubay ====
- Voter Population (2016): 41,792

Ubay Mayoral Election
Party	Candidate	Votes	%
NPC	Constantino Reyes	17,105	54.55%
Liberal	Galicano Atup	13,675	43.61%
Independent	Danilo Mendez	572	1.82%
Total votes		31,352	100.00%

Ubay Vice Mayoral Election
Party	Candidate	Votes	%
Liberal	Nelson Uy	18,673	66.79%
NPC	Constancio Atuel	9,282	33.20%
Total votes		27,955	100.00%

=== Third District ===
Parties are as stated in their certificates of candidacy.

==== Alicia ====
- Voter Population (2016): 13,423

Alicia Mayoral Election
Party	Candidate	Votes	%
Liberal	Marnilou Salas-Ayuban	9,500	95.82%
Independent	Valerio Ranollo	414	4.17%
Total votes		9,914	100.00%

Alicia Vice Mayoral Election
Party	Candidate	Votes	%
Liberal	Victoriano Torres III	4,838	49.65%
PDP–Laban	Leonardo Namoco	4,307	44.20%
Independent	Jonathan Puracan	481	4.93%
Independent	Renato Butawan	118	1.21%
Total votes		9,744	100.00%

==== Anda ====
- Voter Population (2016): 11,852

Anda Mayoral Election
Party	Candidate	Votes	%
PDP–Laban	Angelina Blanco-Simacio	5,338	53.08%
Liberal	Metodio Amper	4,717	46.91%
Total votes		10,055	100.00%

Anda Vice Mayoral Election
Party	Candidate	Votes	%
PDP–Laban	Nilo Bersabal	5,206	53.18%
Liberal	Vicente Tinio	4,582	46.81%
Total votes		9,788	100.00%

==== Batuan ====
- Voter Population (2016): 8,359

Batuan Mayoral Election
Party	Candidate	Votes	%
Liberal	Antonino Jumawid	4,219	60.98%
PDP–Laban	Francisco Pepito	2,699	39.01%
Total votes		6,918	100.00%

Batuan Vice Mayoral Election
Party	Candidate	Votes	%
PDP–Laban	Precious Joy Dumagan-Baguio	3,539	53.02%
Liberal	Marcelino Sumampong	3,135	46.97%
Total votes		6,674	100.00%

==== Bilar ====
- Voter Population (2016): 11,565

Bilar Mayoral Election
Party	Candidate	Votes	%
Liberal	Norman Palacio	6,713	74.31%
UNA	Elmer Namocat	2,320	25.68%
Total votes		9,033	100.00%

Bilar Vice Mayoral Election
Party	Candidate	Votes	%
Liberal	Arnold Calamba	5,422	61.84%
UNA	Ramoncita Cabusao	3,345	38.15%
Total votes		8,767	100.00%

==== Candijay ====
- Voter Population (2016): 19,708

Candijay Mayoral Election
Party	Candidate	Votes	%
Liberal	Christopher Tutor	11,908	73.50%
UNA	Sergio Amora III	4,292	26.49%
Total votes		16,200	100.00%

Candijay Vice Mayoral Election
Party	Candidate	Votes	%
Liberal	Jesse Sales	10,728	68.84%
Independent	Robert Olaer	4,854	31.15%
Total votes		15,582	100.00%

==== Carmen ====
- Voter Population (2016): 29,767

Carmen Mayoral Election
Party	Candidate	Votes	%
PDP–Laban	Ricardo Francisco Toribio	13,139	55.21%
Liberal	Pedro Budiongan Jr.	10,655	44.78%
Total votes		23,794	100.00%

Carmen Vice Mayoral Election
Party	Candidate	Votes	%
Liberal	Romeo Bigay Jr.	12,382	54.35%
PDP–Laban	Danilo Palgan	10,396	45.64%
Total votes		22,778	100.00%

==== Dimiao ====
- Voter Population (2016): 9,965

Dimiao Mayoral Election
Party	Candidate	Votes	%
PDP–Laban	Danilo Guivencan	4,272	52.74%
Liberal	Gilberto Lagua	3,827	47.25%
Total votes		8,099	100.00%

Dimiao Vice Mayoral Election
Party	Candidate	Votes	%
PDP–Laban	Aniceta Calihat-Ucang	3,586	45.40%
Independent	Dennis Magtajas	2,249	28.47%
Liberal	Russel Yecyec	2,063	26.12%
Total votes		7,898	100.00%

==== Duero ====
- Voter Population (2016): 12,150

Duero Mayoral Election
Party	Candidate	Votes	%
Liberal	Conrada Castino-Amparo	6,037	60.68%
PDP–Laban	Ronald Felisilda	3,805	38.24%
Independent	Trifon Olaer	106	1.06%
Total votes		9,948	100.00%

Duero Vice Mayoral Election
Party	Candidate	Votes	%
Liberal	Emma Fe Peligro-Bajade	6,516	67.48%
PDP–Laban	Polienoto Bernadas	3,140	32.51%
Total votes		9,656	100.00%

==== Garcia Hernandez ====
- Voter Population (2016): 14,484

Garcia Hernandez Mayoral Election
Party	Candidate	Votes	%
PDP–Laban	Tita Baja-Gallentes	6,248	52.81%
Liberal	Miguelito Galendez	5,583	47.18%
Total votes		11,831	100.00%

Garcia Hernandez Mayoral Election
Party	Candidate	Votes	%
Liberal	Lito Dajalos	5,748	50.21%
PDP–Laban	Cesar Madelo	5,699	49.78%
Total votes		11,447	100.00%

==== Guindulman ====
- Voter Population (2016): 20,529

Guindulman Mayoral Election
Party	Candidate	Votes	%
PDP–Laban	Albino Balo	8,437	51.53%
Liberal	Elpidio Bonita	7,933	48.46%
Total votes		16,370	100.00%

Guindulman Vice Mayoral Election
Party	Candidate	Votes	%
PDP–Laban	Maria Fe Añana-Piezas	8,451	52.61%
Liberal	Abigail Lagura-Gutang	7,612	47.38%
Total votes		16,063	100.00%

==== Jagna ====
- Voter Population (2016): 20,459

Jagna Mayoral Election
Party	Candidate	Votes	%
Liberal	Fortunato Abrenilla	8,940	52.84%
Independent	Joseph Rañola	7,978	47.15%
Total votes		16,918	100.00%

Jagna Vice Mayoral Election
Party	Candidate	Votes	%
Liberal	Bonifacio Virtudes Jr.	11,634	70.87%
LDP	Cesario Cagulada	4,781	29.12%
Total votes		16,415	100.00%

==== Lila ====
- Voter Population (2016): 6,835

For the two consecutive elections, incumbent mayor Regina Cahiles-Salazar is running unopposed.

Lila Mayoral Election
Party	Candidate	Votes	%
Liberal	Regina Cahiles-Salazar	4,289	100.00%
Total votes		4,289	100.00%

Lila Vice Mayoral Election
Party	Candidate	Votes	%
Liberal	Arturo Piollo II	3,189	57.32%
NPC	Alfonso Lim	2,374	42.67%
Total votes		5,563	100.00%

==== Loay ====
- Voter Population (2016): 11,777

Loay Mayoral Election
Party	Candidate	Votes	%
PDP–Laban	Richelle Brigitte Imboy	5,175	52.78%
Liberal	Jescelo Adiong	4,616	47.08%
Independent	Lemuel Baliwis	13	0.13%
Total votes		9,804	100.00%

Loay Vice Mayoral Election
Party	Candidate	Votes	%
PDP–Laban	Brigido Imboy	4,884	51.92%
Liberal	Hermes Entero	4,522	48.07%
Total votes		9,406	100.00%

==== Loboc ====
- Voter Population (2016): 11,472

Loboc Mayoral Election
Party	Candidate	Votes	%
PDP–Laban	Helen Calipusan-Alaba	6,462	67.06%
Liberal	Artemio Delfin	3,173	32.93%
Total votes		9,635	100.00%

Loboc Vice Mayoral Election
Party	Candidate	Votes	%
PDP–Laban	Pablito Sumampong	5,114	53.80%
Liberal	Erwin Baquial	4,391	46.19%
Total votes		9,505	100.00%

==== Mabini ====
- Voter Population (2016): 16,609

Mabini Mayoral Election
Party	Candidate	Votes	%
Liberal	Juanito Jayoma	6,787	50.38%
PDP–Laban	Esther Fostanes-Tabigue	6,683	49.61%
Total votes		13,470	100.00%

Mabini Vice Mayoral Election
Party	Candidate	Votes	%
PDP–Laban	Jesha Cuyacot-Toque	7,201	54.75%
Liberal	Crispina Ayag-Vergara	5,951	45.24%
Total votes		13,152	100.00%

==== Pilar ====
- Voter Population (2016): 16,152

Pilar Mayoral Election
Party	Candidate	Votes	%
PDP–Laban	Necitas Tabaranza-Cubrado	6,525	50.28%
Liberal	Wilson Pajo	6,452	49.71%
Total votes		12,977	100.00%

Pilar Vice Mayoral Election
Party	Candidate	Votes	%
PDP–Laban	Eugenio Datahan II	6,657	53.79%
Liberal	Wilfredo Bernante	5,718	46.20%
Total votes		12,375	100.00%

==== Sevilla ====
- Voter Population (2016): 7,156

Sevilla Mayoral Election
Party	Candidate	Votes	%
PDP–Laban	Juliet Bucag-Dano	3,211	51.79%
Liberal	Ernesita Bungabong-Digal	2,989	48.20%
Total votes		6,200	100.00%

Sevilla Vice Mayoral Election
Party	Candidate	Votes	%
PDP–Laban	Richard Bucag	3,275	54.61%
Liberal	Maria Emily Desierto-Daga-ang	2,721	45.38%
Total votes		5,996	100.00%

==== Sierra Bullones ====
- Voter Population (2016): 15,053

Sierra Bullones Mayoral Election
Party	Candidate	Votes	%
Liberal	Simplicio Maestrado	5,868	48.57%
Independent	Alfredo Gamalo	3,845	31.82%
UNA	Rey Yamaro	2,368	19.60%
Total votes		12,081	100.00%

Sierra Bullones Vice Mayoral Election
Party	Candidate	Votes	%
Liberal	Rainfredo Buslon	5,361	46.83%
PDP–Laban	Nador Yabay	4,374	38.21%
UNA	Jane Virtudazo-Arañez	1,712	14.95%
Total votes		11,447	100.00%

==== Valencia ====
- Voter Population (2016): 15,245

Incumbent mayor Maria Katrina Lim is seeking for reelection. Incumbent councilor Calixto Garcia is running for vice-mayor unopposed.

Valencia Mayoral Election
Party	Candidate	Votes	%
Liberal	Maria Katrina Lim	10,078	88.06%
PDP–Laban	Edgardo Namuag	1,366	11.93%
Total votes		11,444	100.00%

Valencia Vice Mayoral Election
Party	Candidate	Votes	%
Liberal	Calixto Garcia	9,302	100.00%
Total votes		9,302	100.00%
