= Bohol's 2nd congressional district =

House of Representatives of the Philippines legislative district

- Constituency for the House of Representatives of the Philippines
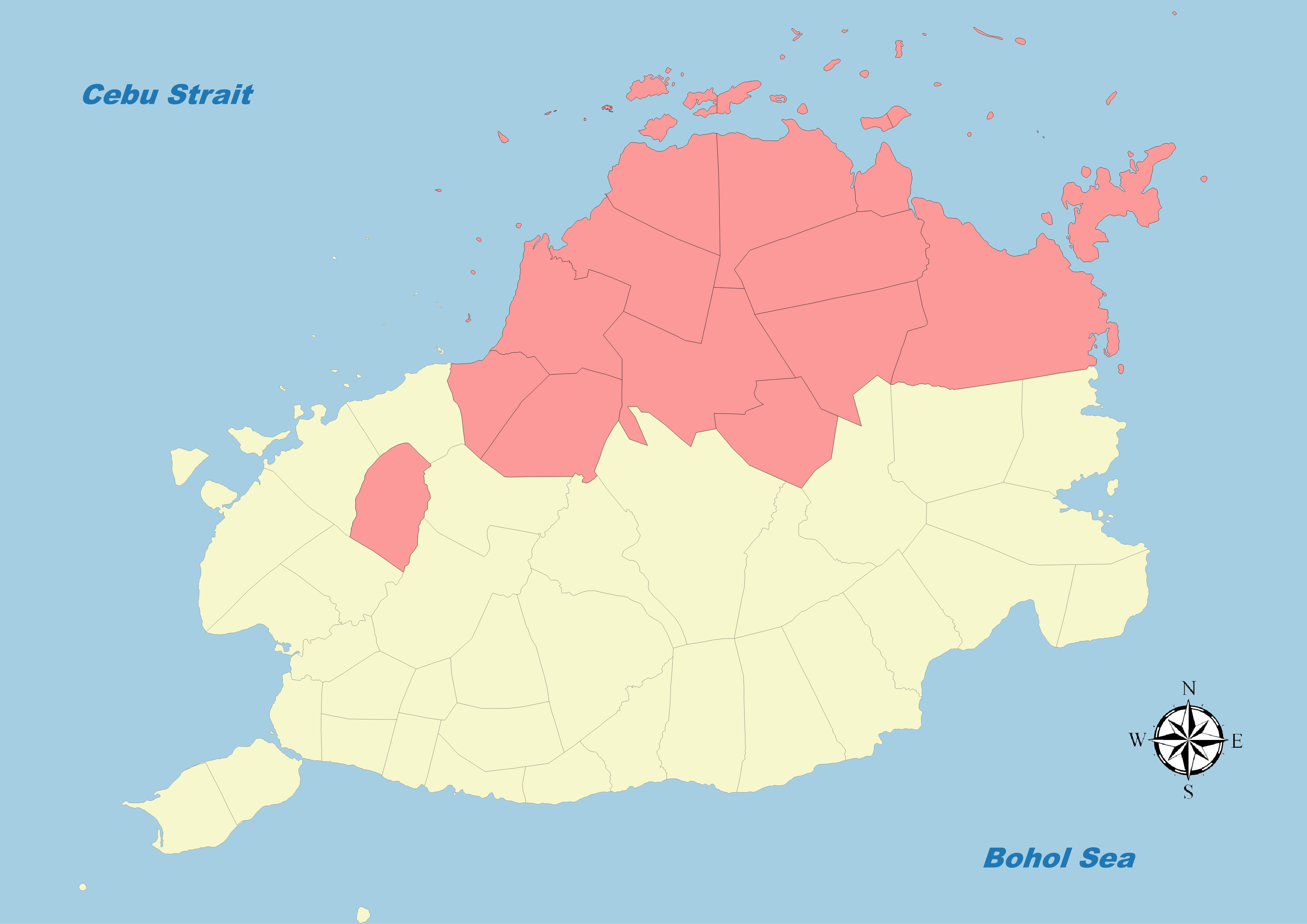
- Boundary of Bohol's 2nd congressional district in Bohol

- Location of Bohol within the Philippines
- Province: Bohol
- Region: Central Visayas
- Population: 439,771 (2015)
- Electorate: 257,827 (2016)
- Major settlements: 14 LGUs: Municipalities; Bien Unido; Buenavista; Clarin; Dagohoy; Danao; Getafe; Inabanga; President Carlos P. Garcia; Sagbayan; San Isidro; San Miguel; Talibon; Trinidad; Ubay
- Area: 1,640.57 km^{2} (633.43 sq mi)

Current constituency
- Created: 1907
- Representative: Vanessa Aumentado
- Political party: NUP
- Congressional bloc: Majority

Bohol's 2nd congressional district is one of the three congressional districts of the Philippines in the province of Bohol. It has been represented in the House of Representatives of the Philippines since 1916 and earlier in the Philippine Assembly from 1907 to 1916. The district consists of the northern municipalities of Bien Unido, Buenavista, Clarin, Dagohoy, Danao, Getafe, Inabanga, President Carlos P. Garcia, Sagbayan, San Isidro, San Miguel, Talibon, Trinidad and Ubay. It is currently represented in the 20th Congress by Vanessa Aumentado of the National Unity Party (NUP).

== Representation history ==
#	Image	Member	Term of office		Legislature	Party	Electoral history	Constituent LGUs
#	Image	Member	Start	End	Legislature	Party	Electoral history	Constituent LGUs
=== Bohol's 2nd district for the Philippine Assembly ===
District created January 9, 1907.
1		José Clarín	October 16, 1907	October 16, 1916	1st	Nacionalista	Elected in 1907.	1907–1916; Alburquerque, Batuan, Bilar, Carmen, Dimiao, Inabanga, Loay, Loboc, Sevilla, Tubigon
1		José Clarín	October 16, 1907	October 16, 1916	2nd	Nacionalista	Re-elected in 1909.	1907–1916; Alburquerque, Batuan, Bilar, Carmen, Dimiao, Inabanga, Loay, Loboc, Sevilla, Tubigon
1		José Clarín	October 16, 1907	October 16, 1916	3rd	Nacionalista	Re-elected in 1912.	1907–1916; Alburquerque, Batuan, Bilar, Carmen, Dimiao, Inabanga, Loay, Loboc, Sevilla, Tubigon
=== Bohol's 2nd district for the House of Representatives of the Philippine Islands ===
2		Macario Lumain	October 16, 1916	June 6, 1922	4th	Nacionalista	Elected in 1916.	1916–1919 Alburquerque, Batuan, Bilar, Carmen, Dimiao, Inabanga, Lila, Loay, Loboc, Sevilla, Tubigon
2		Macario Lumain	October 16, 1916	June 6, 1922	5th	Nacionalista	Re-elected in 1919.	1919–1935 Alburquerque, Batuan, Bilar, Carmen, Clarin, Dimiao, Inabanga, Lila, Loay, Loboc, Sevilla, Sikatuna, Tubigon
3		Cornelio G. Sarigumba	June 6, 1922	June 2, 1925	6th	Independent	Elected in 1922.	1919–1935 Alburquerque, Batuan, Bilar, Carmen, Clarin, Dimiao, Inabanga, Lila, Loay, Loboc, Sevilla, Sikatuna, Tubigon
4		Olegario B. Clarín	June 2, 1925	June 5, 1928	7th	Nacionalista; Consolidado	Elected in 1925.	1919–1935 Alburquerque, Batuan, Bilar, Carmen, Clarin, Dimiao, Inabanga, Lila, Loay, Loboc, Sevilla, Sikatuna, Tubigon
5		Marcelo S. Ramírez	June 5, 1928	June 5, 1934	8th	Independent	Elected in 1928.	1919–1935 Alburquerque, Batuan, Bilar, Carmen, Clarin, Dimiao, Inabanga, Lila, Loay, Loboc, Sevilla, Sikatuna, Tubigon
5		Marcelo S. Ramírez	June 5, 1928	June 5, 1934	9th	Independent	Re-elected in 1931.	1919–1935 Alburquerque, Batuan, Bilar, Carmen, Clarin, Dimiao, Inabanga, Lila, Loay, Loboc, Sevilla, Sikatuna, Tubigon
6		Macario Q. Falcón	June 5, 1934	September 16, 1935	10th	Nacionalista; Democrático	Elected in 1934.	1919–1935 Alburquerque, Batuan, Bilar, Carmen, Clarin, Dimiao, Inabanga, Lila, Loay, Loboc, Sevilla, Sikatuna, Tubigon
#	Image	Member	Term of office		National Assembly	Party	Electoral history	Constituent LGUs
#	Image	Member	Start	End	National Assembly	Party	Electoral history	Constituent LGUs
=== Bohol's 2nd district for the National Assembly (Commonwealth of the Philippines) ===
(4)		Olegario B. Clarín	September 16, 1935	December 30, 1941	1st	Nacionalista; Democrático	Elected in 1935.	1935–1941; Alburquerque, Batuan, Bilar, Carmen, Clarin, Dimiao, Inabanga, Lila, Loay, Loboc, Sevilla, Sikatuna, Tubigon
(4)		Olegario B. Clarín	September 16, 1935	December 30, 1941	2nd	Nacionalista	Re-elected in 1938.	1935–1941; Alburquerque, Batuan, Bilar, Carmen, Clarin, Dimiao, Inabanga, Lila, Loay, Loboc, Sevilla, Sikatuna, Tubigon
District dissolved into the two-seat Bohol's at-large district for the National Assembly (Second Philippine Republic).
#	Image	Member	Term of office		Common wealth Congress	Party	Electoral history	Constituent LGUs
#	Image	Member	Start	End	Common wealth Congress	Party	Electoral history	Constituent LGUs
=== Bohol's 2nd district for the House of Representatives of the Commonwealth of the Philippines ===
District re-created May 24, 1945.
(4)		Olegario B. Clarín	June 11, 1945	May 25, 1946	1st	Nacionalista	Re-elected in 1941.	1945–1946; Alburquerque, Batuan, Bilar, Carmen, Clarin, Dimiao, Inabanga, Lila, Loay, Loboc, Sevilla, Sikatuna, Tubigon
#	Image	Member	Term of office		Congress	Party	Electoral history	Constituent LGUs
#	Image	Member	Start	End	Congress	Party	Electoral history	Constituent LGUs
=== Bohol's 2nd district for the House of Representatives of the Philippines ===
7		Simeon Toribio	May 25, 1946	December 30, 1953	1st	Liberal	Elected in 1946.	1946–1949; Alburquerque, Batuan, Bilar, Carmen, Clarin, Dimiao, Inabanga, Lila, Loay, Loboc, Sevilla, Sikatuna, Tubigon
7		Simeon Toribio	May 25, 1946	December 30, 1953	2nd	Liberal	Re-elected in 1949.	1949–1957; Alburquerque, Batuan, Bilar, Borja, Carmen, Clarin, Dimiao, Inabanga, Lila, Loay, Loboc, San Jacinto, Sevilla, Sikatuna, Tubigon
8		Bartolomé C. Cabangbang	December 30, 1953	December 30, 1965	3rd	Nacionalista	Elected in 1953.	1949–1957; Alburquerque, Batuan, Bilar, Borja, Carmen, Clarin, Dimiao, Inabanga, Lila, Loay, Loboc, San Jacinto, Sevilla, Sikatuna, Tubigon
8		Bartolomé C. Cabangbang	December 30, 1953	December 30, 1965	4th	Nacionalista	Re-elected in 1957.	1957–1972; Alburquerque, Batuan, Bilar, Carmen, Catigbian, Clarin, Dimiao, Inabanga, Lila, Loay, Loboc, Sagbayan, Sevilla, Sikatuna, Tubigon
8		Bartolomé C. Cabangbang	December 30, 1953	December 30, 1965	5th	Nacionalista	Re-elected in 1961.	1957–1972; Alburquerque, Batuan, Bilar, Carmen, Catigbian, Clarin, Dimiao, Inabanga, Lila, Loay, Loboc, Sagbayan, Sevilla, Sikatuna, Tubigon
9		José S. Zafra	December 30, 1965	December 30, 1969	6th	Nacionalista	Elected in 1965.	1957–1972; Alburquerque, Batuan, Bilar, Carmen, Catigbian, Clarin, Dimiao, Inabanga, Lila, Loay, Loboc, Sagbayan, Sevilla, Sikatuna, Tubigon
10		Pablo A. Malasarte	December 30, 1969	September 23, 1972	7th	Nacionalista	Elected in 1969. Removed from office after imposition of martial law.	1957–1972; Alburquerque, Batuan, Bilar, Carmen, Catigbian, Clarin, Dimiao, Inabanga, Lila, Loay, Loboc, Sagbayan, Sevilla, Sikatuna, Tubigon
District dissolved into the thirteen-seat Region VII's at-large district for the Interim Batasang Pambansa, followed by the three-seat Bohol's at-large district for the Regular Batasang Pambansa.
District re-created February 2, 1987.
11		David B. Tirol	June 30, 1987	June 30, 1992	8th	KBL	Elected in 1987.	1987–present Bien Unido, Buenavista, Clarin, Dagohoy, Danao, Getafe, Inabanga, President Carlos P. Garcia, Sagbayan, San Isidro, San Miguel, Talibon, Trinidad, Ubay
12		Erico B. Aumentado	June 30, 1992	June 30, 2001	9th	Lakas	Elected in 1992.	1987–present Bien Unido, Buenavista, Clarin, Dagohoy, Danao, Getafe, Inabanga, President Carlos P. Garcia, Sagbayan, San Isidro, San Miguel, Talibon, Trinidad, Ubay
12		Erico B. Aumentado	June 30, 1992	June 30, 2001	10th	Lakas	Re-elected in 1995.	1987–present Bien Unido, Buenavista, Clarin, Dagohoy, Danao, Getafe, Inabanga, President Carlos P. Garcia, Sagbayan, San Isidro, San Miguel, Talibon, Trinidad, Ubay
12		Erico B. Aumentado	June 30, 1992	June 30, 2001	11th	Lakas	Re-elected in 1998.	1987–present Bien Unido, Buenavista, Clarin, Dagohoy, Danao, Getafe, Inabanga, President Carlos P. Garcia, Sagbayan, San Isidro, San Miguel, Talibon, Trinidad, Ubay
13		Roberto C. Cajes	June 30, 2001	June 30, 2010	12th	Lakas	Elected in 2001.	1987–present Bien Unido, Buenavista, Clarin, Dagohoy, Danao, Getafe, Inabanga, President Carlos P. Garcia, Sagbayan, San Isidro, San Miguel, Talibon, Trinidad, Ubay
13		Roberto C. Cajes	June 30, 2001	June 30, 2010	13th	Lakas	Re-elected in 2004.	1987–present Bien Unido, Buenavista, Clarin, Dagohoy, Danao, Getafe, Inabanga, President Carlos P. Garcia, Sagbayan, San Isidro, San Miguel, Talibon, Trinidad, Ubay
13		Roberto C. Cajes	June 30, 2001	June 30, 2010	14th	Lakas	Re-elected in 2007.	1987–present Bien Unido, Buenavista, Clarin, Dagohoy, Danao, Getafe, Inabanga, President Carlos P. Garcia, Sagbayan, San Isidro, San Miguel, Talibon, Trinidad, Ubay
(12)		Erico B. Aumentado	June 30, 2010	December 25, 2012	15th	NPC	Elected in 2010. Died.	1987–present Bien Unido, Buenavista, Clarin, Dagohoy, Danao, Getafe, Inabanga, President Carlos P. Garcia, Sagbayan, San Isidro, San Miguel, Talibon, Trinidad, Ubay
14		Erico Aristotle C. Aumentado	June 30, 2013	June 30, 2022	16th	NPC	Elected in 2013.	1987–present Bien Unido, Buenavista, Clarin, Dagohoy, Danao, Getafe, Inabanga, President Carlos P. Garcia, Sagbayan, San Isidro, San Miguel, Talibon, Trinidad, Ubay
14		Erico Aristotle C. Aumentado	June 30, 2013	June 30, 2022	17th	NPC	Re-elected in 2016.	1987–present Bien Unido, Buenavista, Clarin, Dagohoy, Danao, Getafe, Inabanga, President Carlos P. Garcia, Sagbayan, San Isidro, San Miguel, Talibon, Trinidad, Ubay
14		Erico Aristotle C. Aumentado	June 30, 2013	June 30, 2022	18th	NPC	Re-elected in 2019.	1987–present Bien Unido, Buenavista, Clarin, Dagohoy, Danao, Getafe, Inabanga, President Carlos P. Garcia, Sagbayan, San Isidro, San Miguel, Talibon, Trinidad, Ubay
15		Ma. Vanessa C. Aumentado	June 30, 2022	Incumbent	19th	Lakas	Elected in 2022.	1987–present Bien Unido, Buenavista, Clarin, Dagohoy, Danao, Getafe, Inabanga, President Carlos P. Garcia, Sagbayan, San Isidro, San Miguel, Talibon, Trinidad, Ubay
15		Ma. Vanessa C. Aumentado	June 30, 2022	Incumbent	20th	NUP	Re-elected in 2025.	1987–present Bien Unido, Buenavista, Clarin, Dagohoy, Danao, Getafe, Inabanga, President Carlos P. Garcia, Sagbayan, San Isidro, San Miguel, Talibon, Trinidad, Ubay

== Election results ==
=== 2025 ===
2025 Philippine House of Representatives elections
Candidate	Party	Votes	%
Vanvan Aumentado (incumbent)	Lakas–CMD	187,719	78.86
Modesto Membreve	Liberal Party	50,308	21.14
Total		238,027	100.00
Valid votes		238,027	83.43
Invalid/blank votes		47,278	16.57
Total votes		285,305	100.00
Registered voters/turnout		326,937	87.27
Lakas–CMD hold			
Source: Commission on Elections

=== 2022 ===
2022 Philippine House of Representatives elections
Party	Candidate	Votes	%
PRP	Ma. Vanessa C. Aumentado	138,266	50.24%
NUP	Jovanna Jumamoy	92,728	33.69%
PMP	Gerardo Garcia	10,642	3.87%
Lakas	Ramil Melencion	828	0.30%
Independent	Marcos Auza	558	0.20%
Valid ballots		243,022	88.30%
Invalid or blank votes		32,197	11.70%
Total votes		275,219	100.00%

=== 2019 ===
2019 Philippine House of Representatives elections
Party	Candidate	Votes	%
NPC	Erico Aristotle Aumentado	148,541	71.08%
NUP	Agapito Avenido	60,424	28.92%
Total votes		208,965	100.00%
NPC hold			

=== 2016 ===
2016 Philippine House of Representatives elections
Party	Candidate	Votes	%
NPC	Erico Aristotle Aumentado	134,537	72.94%
NUP	Gerardo Garcia	49,909	27.05%
Invalid or blank votes		37,071	
Total votes		221,517	100.00%

=== 2013 ===
2013 Philippine House of Representatives elections
Party	Candidate	Votes	%
NPC	Erico Aristotle Aumentado	99,691	50.64
Liberal	Roberto Cajes	70,128	35.62
Margin of victory		29,563	15.02%
Invalid or blank votes		27,060	13.74
Total votes		196,879	100.00
NPC hold			

=== 2010 ===
2010 Philippine House of Representatives elections
Party	Candidate	Votes	%
Independent	Erico B. Aumentado	100,391	57.14
Lakas–Kampi	Judith Cajes	61,383	34.94
Liberal	Danilo Mendez	11,131	6.34
PMP	Rolando Manatad	2,790	1.59
Valid ballots		175,695	90.21
Invalid or blank votes		19,070	9.79
Total votes		194,765	100.00
Independent gain from Lakas–Kampi			

== See also ==
- Legislative districts of Bohol
