= Sikatuna =

Sikatuna may refer to:

- Datu Sikatuna, chieftain of Bohol in the Philippines
- Sikatuna, Bohol, a municipality of the Philippines
