= Bohol Island State University =

Public university in Bohol, Philippines

- Pamantasang Pampamahalaan ng Bohol ᜉᜋᜈ᜔ᜆᜐᜅ᜔ ᜉᜋ᜔ᜉᜋᜑᜎᜀᜈ᜔ ᜅ᜔ ᜊᜓᜑᜓᜎ᜔ (Filipino)
- Other name: BISU
- Former names: Central Visayas State College of Agriculture, Forestry and Technology (1998-2009)
- Type: State university
- Established: 2009; 17 years ago (as BISU)
- President: Dr. Anthony M. Penaso
- Vice-president: Dr. Renario J. Hinampas, Jr. (VP for Academics & Quality Assurance); Dr. Ivy Corazon A. Mangaya-ay (VP for Research, Innovation & Extension); Dr. Zina D. Sayson (VP for Student Affairs & Services); Dr. Arceli M. Hernando (VP for Administration & Finance)
- Location: Tagbilaran, Bohol, Philippines; 9°38′49.3512″N 123°51′20.181″E
- Campus: Main: Tagbilaran City Satellite: Bingag, Dauis Campus; Balilihan Campus; Bilar Campus; Candijay Campus; Clarin Campus; Calape Campus
- Website: www.bisu.edu.ph
- Location in the Visayas Location in the Philippines

School Anthem
Audio sample
- BISU Hymn: file; help

Bohol Island State University (Filipino: Pamantasang Pampamahalaan ng Isla ng Bohol; BISU) is a public institution of higher learning in Bohol, Philippines. It was formerly called the Central Visayas State College of Agriculture, Forestry and Technology (CVSCAFT). The institution operates campuses spread throughout the province, with the main campus in Tagbilaran, Bohol.

== Overview ==
The institution became the first state university and the third university established in the province of Bohol through the Republic Act No. 9722. The bill was authored by congressmen Edgardo Chatto, Roberto Cajes, Adam Jala, Cynthia Villar and Junie Cua on February 16, 2009. It was then approved by the Congressional Bicameral Conference Committee of the Philippines on August 18, 2009. President Gloria Macapagal Arroyo signed the bill into law on October 14, 2009, and took effect on November 9, 2009.

== History ==
The old CVSCAFT logo

- 1907: Started with a bamboo and nipa shack that housed the class composed of a handful of Grade Five boys taking industrial arts in woodworking. The class was an extension of the Tagbilaran Elementary School. The teacher was an American named George W. Jackson. Years later the class was attached as industrial arts of Bohol Provincial High School.
- 1914: Bohol Trade School was established as a separate school from the Bohol Provincial High School with an initial enrolment of 110 pupils. Bohol Trade school began offering the Secondary Trade Curriculum along with the Intermediate course..
- 1932: The intermediate trade curriculum was dropped. From then on, the school offered the Secondary Trade Curriculum. The first course offered was woodworking, followed by Building Construction and Automechanics. The enrolment reached a little less than 500 until the outbreak of World War II.
- 1948: The four-year Trade course was restored, at the same time keeping the two-year course which was popularly known as the Evening Trade Opportunity Trade Classes (EOTC).
- 1949: The school became co-educational. Female students had a choice of dressmaking, food trades or handicrafts.
- 1950: The FOA-PHILCUSA aid program came to rehabilitate the school. New equipment and hand tools were received to improve the school facilities.
- 1959: Under the Omnibus Act, Bohol Trade School was converted into Bohol School of Arts and Trades. The school offered two-year technical education curriculum, four-year secondary school and EOTC.
- 1968: The school was selected as a Pilot Training Center of the Manpower Training Program under the National Manpower and Youth Council.
- 1975: Authorized to offer the four-year Bachelor of Science in Industrial Technology.
- 1979: Tragedy struck the school on March 24 when fire razed it to ashes. Picking up from the debris of the burned buildings, the school began reconstruction work. In five years, the school rose again with three new buildings.
- 1988: Authorized to offer Technology Courses.
- 1991: Authorized to offer Bachelor in Secondary Education major in THE. Specialization of the school in Civil, Electrical, Refrigeration & Airconditioning and Welding and Fabrication under the Australia Grant in Aid. The school was given equipment and buildings and 11 teachers were sent to Australia for technical training.
- 1993: Authorized to offer Diploma of Technology.
- 1995: Authorized to offer MATVE in the areas of Civil, Drafting & Food Technology.
- 1996: Authorized to offer BS Civil Engineering.
- 1998: Established as Central Visayas State College of Agriculture, Forestry, and Technology (CVSCAFT) via Republic Act No.8659 on June 22, 1998, through the integration of Bohol Agriculture College (BAC) in Bilar, Bohol School of Arts and Trade(BSAT) in Tagbilaran City, Bohol School of Fisheries (BSF) in Cogtong, Candijay, Clarin School of Fisheries (CSF) in Clarin and Calape National School of Fisheries (CNFS) in Calape, with CVSCAFT-Bilar served as the main campus.
- 1999:
  - Calape Polytechnic College was integrated and named as one of the campuses of CVSCAFT.
  - Authorized to open BS Mechanical Engineering.
- 2000: Authorized to offer BS Computer and Electrical Engineering.
- 2006: Established extension classes in Balilihan, Bohol, offering BS in Computer Science & BSIT major in Garment Technology. BISU offers new courses such as: BS in Elementary Education, BS Tourism, BS in Office System Management and BS in entrepreneurship.
- 2009: BISU was established through Republic Act No. 9722, became the first state university in the province.

== Campuses ==
- BISU - Main Campus - formerly The Bohol School of Arts and Trade (BSAT) was established in 1906. It started as Bohol Trade School and was converted into a school of arts and trades in 1959. It is located along CPG Avenue, Tagbilaran City.
- BISU Main Campus - Bingag Extension - located in Bingag, Dauis, 15 kilometers away from Tagbilaran City. It was established in 2009.
- BISU - Balilihan Campus - initially established as BISU Main Campus extension class in 2006 and eventually became a full-fledged campus in 2009.
- BISU - Bilar Campus - served as the main campus from 1998 to 2009. Formerly known as Bohol Agriculture College but originally named as Bilar Farm School established in 1968 pursuant to R.A. 5253 under the administration of Dr. Mateo M. Limbago. It is about 42 kilometers away from Tagbilaran City
- BISU - Candijay Campus - formerly known as Bohol School of Fisheries (BSF) is in Cogtong, Candijay, 96 kilometers from Tagbilaran City. It was established in 1958.
- BISU - Clarin Campus - formerly as Clarin School of Fisheries (CSF) is in Poblacion Norte, Clarin, 61 kilometers from Tagbilaran City. It started as Clarin High School in 1948 and in July 1960, converted to School of Fisheries.
- BISU - Calape Campus this is an integration of the following institutions:
  - Calape Community-Based Agro Industrial College (CCBAIC) (June 1989) - founded by the late Mayor Anunciacion Rodriguez-Tuazon.
  - Calape Polytechnic College (CPC) (1992)
  - Central Visayas College of Agriculture, Forestry and Technology (October 30, 1998) - This integration was formalized by virtue of Board of Trustees Resolution No. 2, Series of 1998, and it became known as CVSCAFT Calape Campus.

== Additional references ==
- Senate of the Philippines Republic Act No. 9722, An Act Converting the Central Visayas State College of Agriculture, Forestry and Technology, its Units and Satellite Campuses in the City of Tagbilaran and in the Municipalities of Bilar, Candijay, Clarin, Calape and Balilihan, All Located in the Province of Bohol to Be Known as the Bohol Island State University (BISU)
- Tirol, Jes B. Establishment of the Bohol Trade School
- Tirol, Jes B. An overview of the Central Visayas State College of Agriculture, Forestry and Technology (CVSCAFT)
