= Clarin, Bohol =

Municipality in Bohol, Philippines

Clarin
- Municipality
- Municipality of Clarin
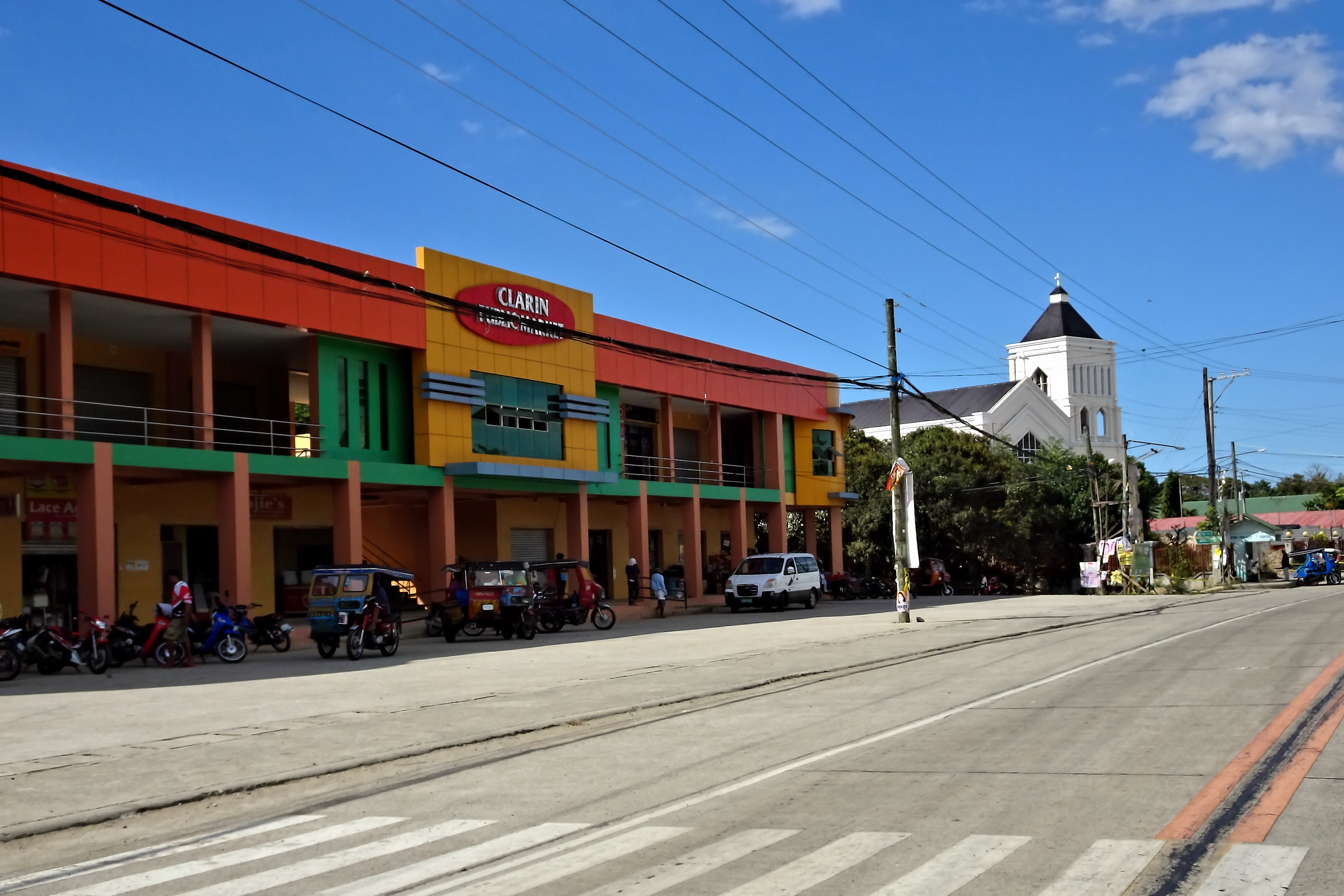
- Clarin – market and church (new 2016)

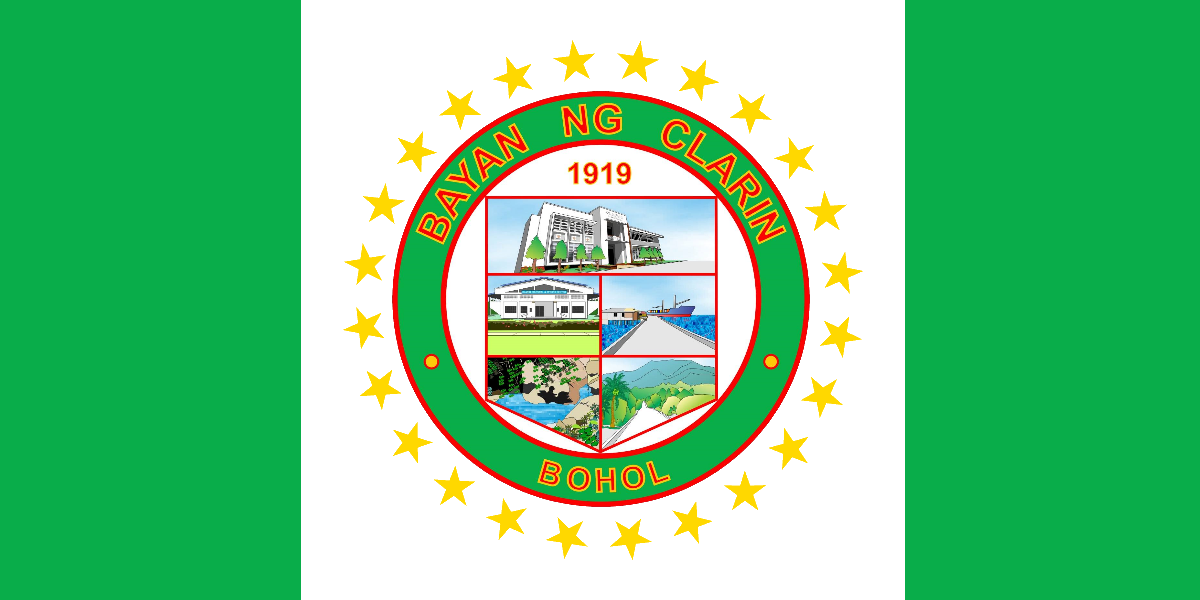
- Flag Seal

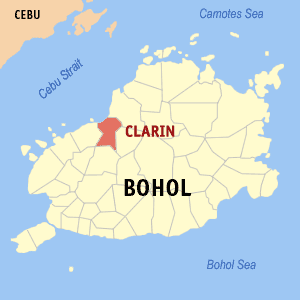
- Map of Bohol with Clarin highlighted
- Interactive map of Clarin
- Location within the Philippines
- Coordinates: 9°58′N 124°01′E
- Country: Philippines
- Region: Central Visayas
- Province: Bohol
- District: 2nd district
- Founded: 31 January 1919
- Barangays: 24 (see Barangays)

Government
  - Type: Sangguniang Bayan
  - Mayor: Engr. Eugeniano E. Ibarra (suspended); Fernando C. Camacho Jr. (acting)
  - Vice Mayor: Nora P. Salera (acting)
  - Representative: Ma. Vanessa C. Aumentado
  - Municipal Council: Members: Nora P. Salera; Engr. Ranielo S. Lanoy; Atty. Cheryl C. Poquita; Corsine C. Salera; Nelson P. Bonajos; Ligaya P. Carcallas; Joan R. Caliao; Christine J. Butal
  - Electorate: 16,673 voters (2025)

Area
  - Total: 52.12 km^{2} (20.12 sq mi)
- Elevation: 61 m (200 ft)
- Highest elevation: 294 m (965 ft)
- Lowest elevation: −1 m (−3.3 ft)

Population (2024 census)
  - Total: 21,318
  - Density: 409.0/km^{2} (1,059/sq mi)
  - Households: 5,114

Economy
  - Income class: 4th municipal income class
  - Poverty incidence: 18.25% (2023)
  - Revenue: ₱ 124.5 million (2024)
  - Assets: ₱ 398.2 million (2024)
  - Expenditure: ₱ 114.1 million (2024)
  - Liabilities: ₱ 38.65 million (2024)

Service provider
  - Electricity: Bohol 1 Electric Cooperative (BOHECO 1)
- Time zone: UTC+8 (PST)
- ZIP code: 6330
- PSGC: 071214000
- IDD : area code: +63 (0)38
- Native languages: Boholano dialect Cebuano; Tagalog

Clarin, officially the Municipality of Clarin (Cebuano: Munisipyo sa Clarin; Tagalog: Bayan ng Clarin), is a municipality in the province of Bohol, Philippines. According to the 2024 census, it has a population of 21,318 people.

== History ==
St. Michael the Archangel Parish due to the 2013 Bohol earthquake

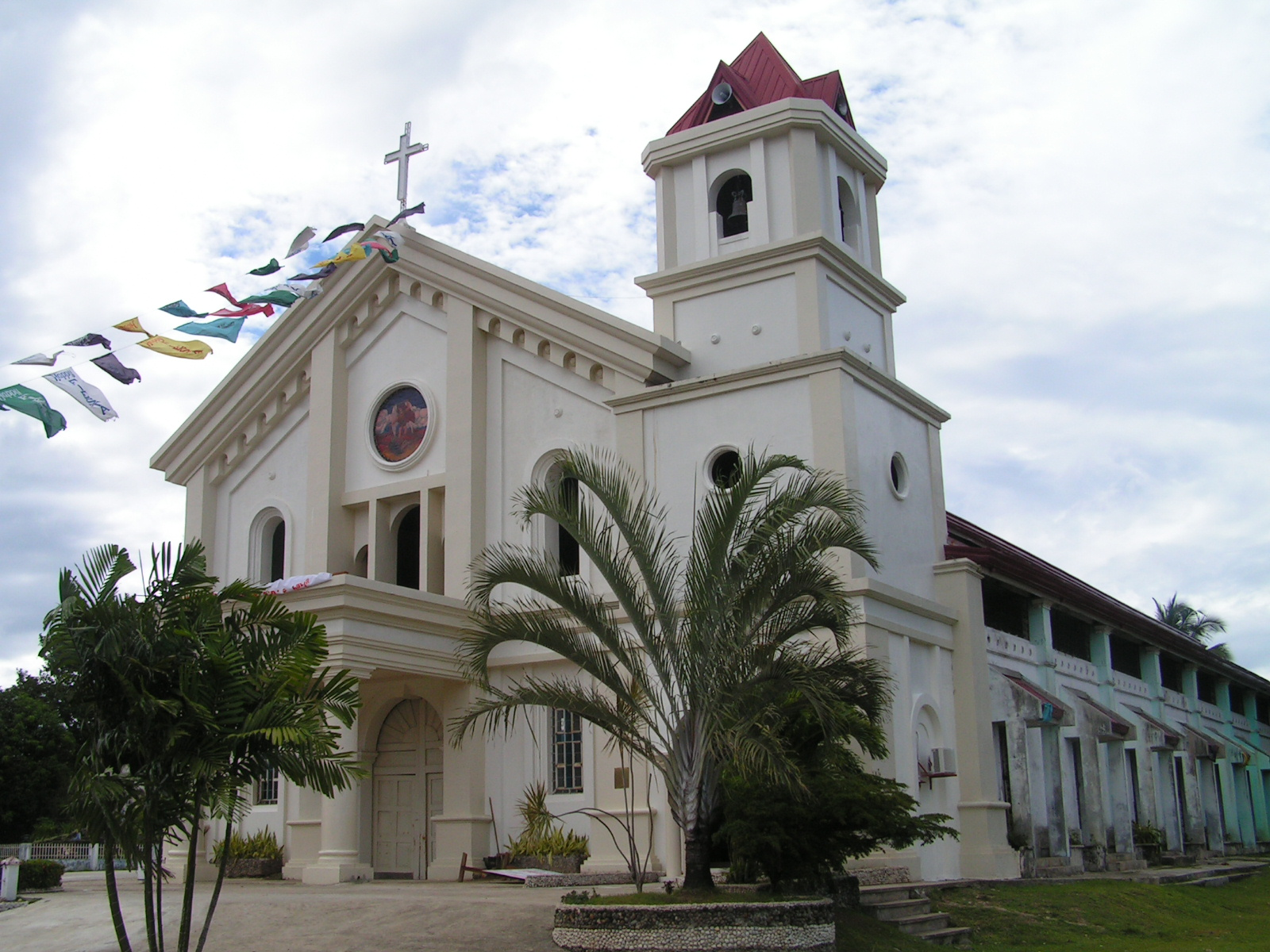
Before

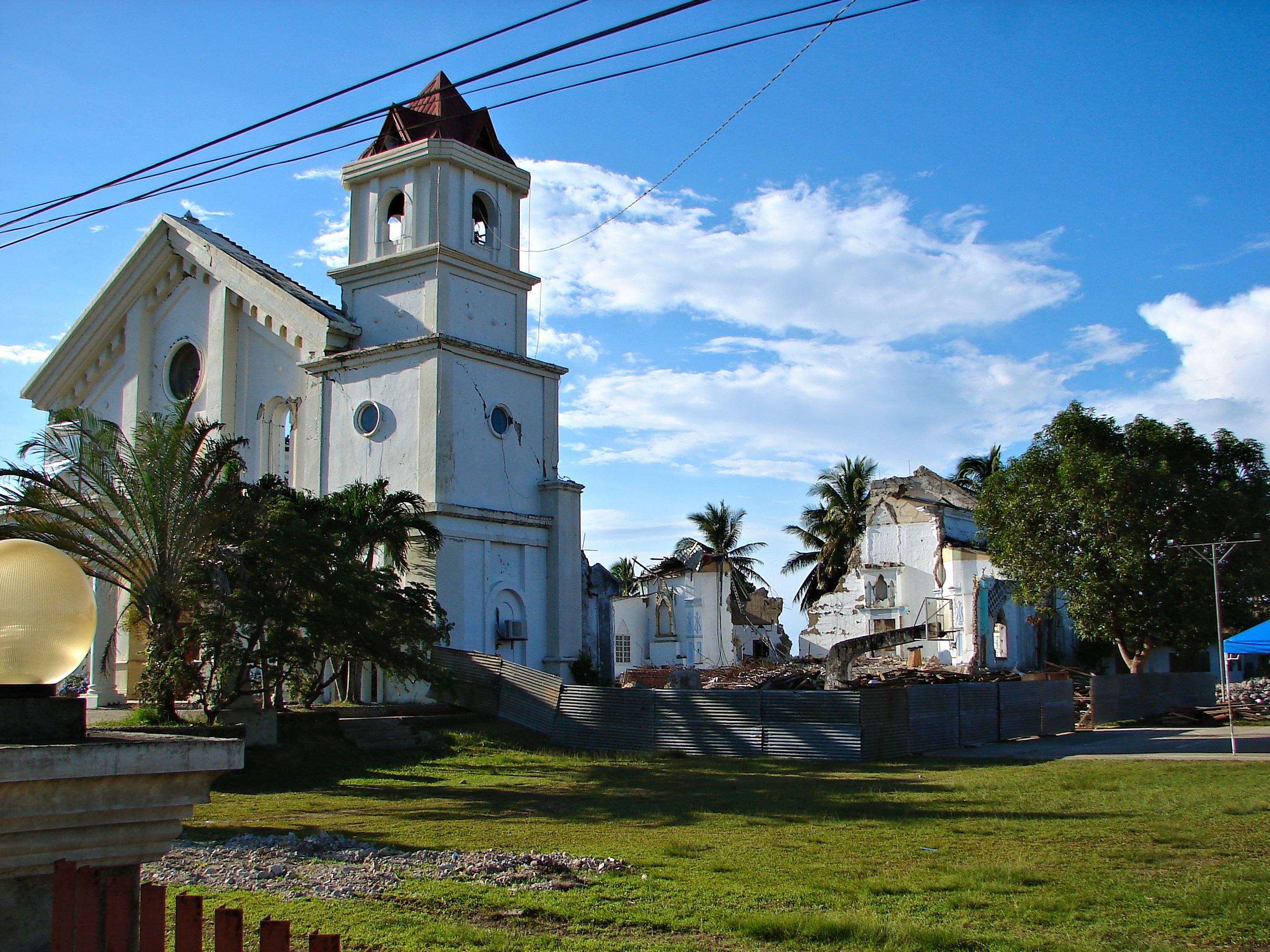
After

On January 1 of 1919, Executive Order No. 3 from the Office of the Governor-General of the Philippine Islands, took effect marking the birth of the Municipality of Clarin in the province of Bohol. It was signed by Acting Governor-General of the Philippine Islands, Charles E. Yeater.

Under Executive Order No. 3, s. 1919, Clarin was initially composed of the barrios/barangays of Canogon, Cumaang, Bonbon, Buangan, Tontunan, and Lajog from the Municipality of Tubigon, and the barrios/barangays of Nahawan, Obohan, and Canmaya from the Municipality of Inabanga. Barrio Canogon became its barrio Poblacion and the seat of the newly created town.

In the same year, Executive Order No. 3 was amended on February 27, 1919, by Executive Order No. 22, which returned barrio/barangay Obohan to its former municipality in exchange for barrio/barangay Cantoyoc, while the rest remained unchanged. Additionally, a boundary line between the Municipalities of Clarin and Inabanga was established along the Nahawan River.

The Municipality of Clarin was named after Don Aniceto Clarín y Vélez, the first Civil Governor of Bohol.

Clarin was severely affected by the 2013 Bohol earthquake which damaged 1,358 homes, of which 221 were totally destroyed, as well as the St. Michael the Archangel Parish Church.

== Geography ==
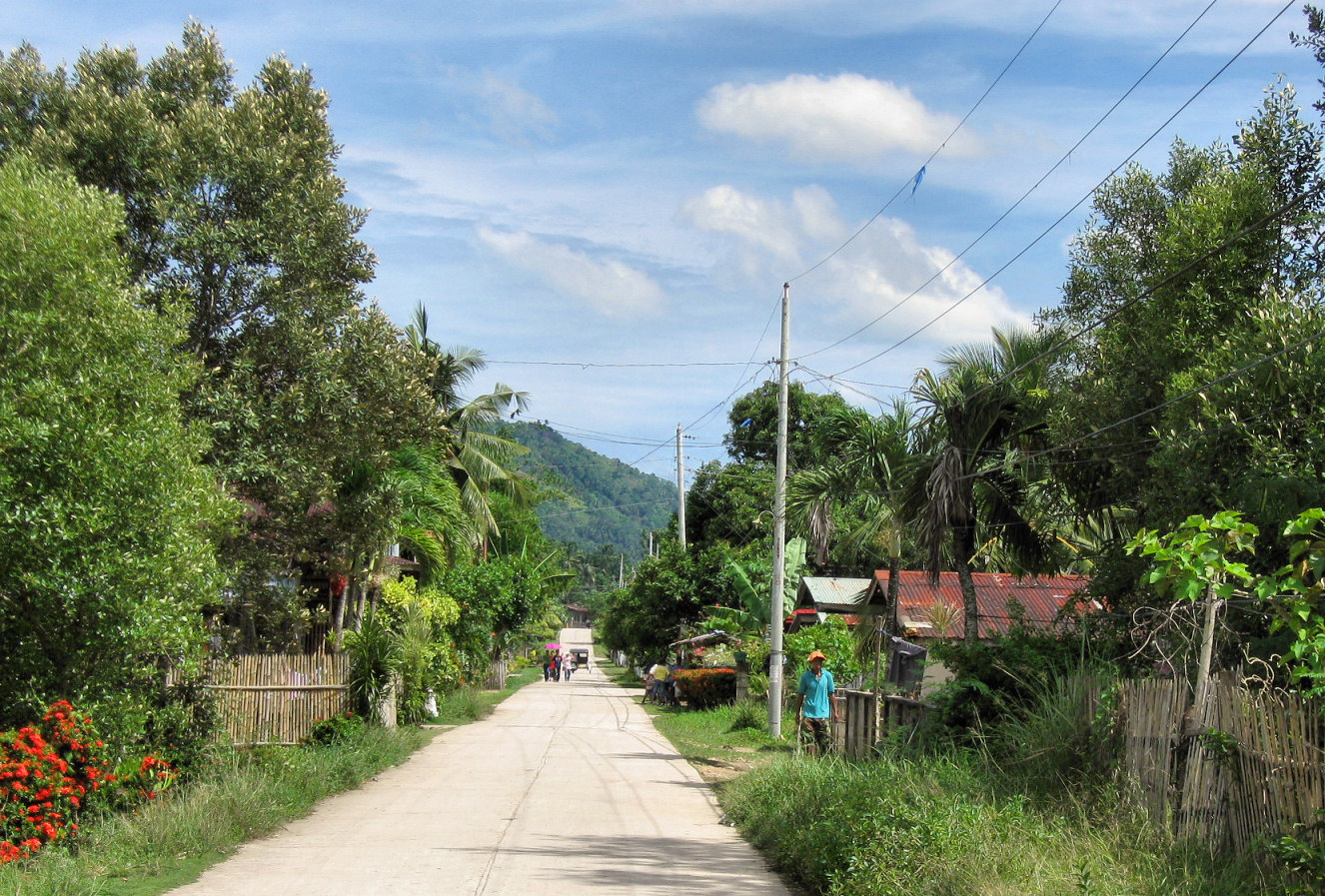
Side street in Clarin

Clarin is bounded by Tubigon in the west, Inabanga in the northeast, Sagbayan in the east, and Catigbian in the south. It is 61 kilometres (38 mi) from Tagbilaran.

=== Barangays ===
Clarin is politically subdivided into 24 barangays. Each barangay consists of puroks and some have sitios.

PSGC	Barangay	Population			±% p.a.	
		2024		2010		
071214001	Bacani	5.6%	1,185	1,208	▾	−0.13%
071214002	Bogtongbod	6.7%	1,428	1,377	▴	0.25%
071214003	Bonbon	6.7%	1,427	1,487	▾	−0.29%
071214004	Bontud	2.3%	497	456	▴	0.60%
071214005	Buacao	3.0%	644	797	▾	−1.47%
071214006	Buangan	3.9%	824	796	▴	0.24%
071214007	Cabog	3.9%	829	764	▴	0.57%
071214008	Caboy	2.7%	569	571	▾	−0.02%
071214009	Caluwasan	1.2%	255	222	▴	0.97%
071214010	Candajec	5.0%	1,061	932	▴	0.91%
071214011	Cantoyoc	1.6%	346	343	▴	0.06%
071214012	Comaang	2.3%	498	471	▴	0.39%
071214013	Danahao	3.3%	693	856	▾	−1.46%
071214014	Katipunan	1.4%	301	340	▾	−0.84%
071214015	Lajog	5.9%	1,262	1,381	▾	−0.62%
071214016	Mataub	3.0%	632	700	▾	−0.71%
071214017	Nahawan	10.3%	2,202	2,208	▾	−0.02%
071214018	Poblacion Centro	6.0%	1,285	1,234	▴	0.28%
071214019	Poblacion Norte	3.9%	831	838	▾	−0.06%
071214020	Poblacion Sur	5.8%	1,246	1,159	▴	0.50%
071214021	Tangaran	3.6%	776	850	▾	−0.63%
071214022	Tontunan	2.8%	593	559	▴	0.41%
071214023	Tubod	2.3%	484	402	▴	1.30%
071214024	Villaflor	2.0%	423	345	▴	1.43%
	Total		21,318	20,296	▴	0.34%

=== Climate ===
Climate data for Clarin, Bohol
Month	Jan	Feb	Mar	Apr	May	Jun	Jul	Aug	Sep	Oct	Nov	Dec	Year
Mean daily maximum °C (°F)	28 (82)	28 (82)	29 (84)	31 (88)	31 (88)	30 (86)	30 (86)	30 (86)	30 (86)	29 (84)	29 (84)	28 (82)	29 (85)
Mean daily minimum °C (°F)	23 (73)	23 (73)	23 (73)	23 (73)	24 (75)	24 (75)	24 (75)	24 (75)	24 (75)	24 (75)	24 (75)	23 (73)	24 (74)
Average precipitation mm (inches)	98 (3.9)	82 (3.2)	96 (3.8)	71 (2.8)	104 (4.1)	129 (5.1)	101 (4.0)	94 (3.7)	99 (3.9)	135 (5.3)	174 (6.9)	143 (5.6)	1,326 (52.3)
Average rainy days	18.0	14.1	17.1	16.8	23.7	25.7	25.8	23.3	24.2	25.9	24.0	20.6	259.2
Source: Meteoblue (modeled/calculated data, not measured locally)

== Demographics ==
Population census of Clarin
Year	Pop.	±% p.a.
1939	15,809	—
1948	15,005	−0.58%
1960	10,248	−3.13%
1970	11,723	+1.35%
1975	13,105	+2.26%
1980	13,721	+0.92%
1990	16,021	+1.56%
1995	15,961	−0.07%
2000	18,040	+2.66%
2007	18,871	+0.62%
2010	20,296	+2.68%
2015	20,301	+0.00%
2020	21,158	+0.87%
2024	21,318	+0.18%
Source: Philippine Statistics Authority

== Economy ==
Poverty incidence of Clarin (%)

Source: Philippine Statistics Authority

== Education ==
Elementary and primary schools

- Bacani Elementary School
- Bogtongbod Elementary School
- Bonbon Elementary School
- Buacao Primary School
- Buangan Elementary School
- Bontud Primary School
- Caboy Elementary School
- Clarin Central Elementary School
- Danahaw Elementary School
- Lajog Elementary School
- Nahawan Elementary School
- Tontunan Elementary School

Secondary schools

- Clarin National School of Fisheries
- Nahawan National High School
- Tontunan National High School
- Danahaw Integrated School
- Presentation Mary School of Clarin (PMSC)

Tertiary schools

- Bohol Island State University [BISU]
