= San Isidro, Bohol =

Municipality in Bohol, Philippines

San Isidro
- Municipality
- Municipality of San Isidro
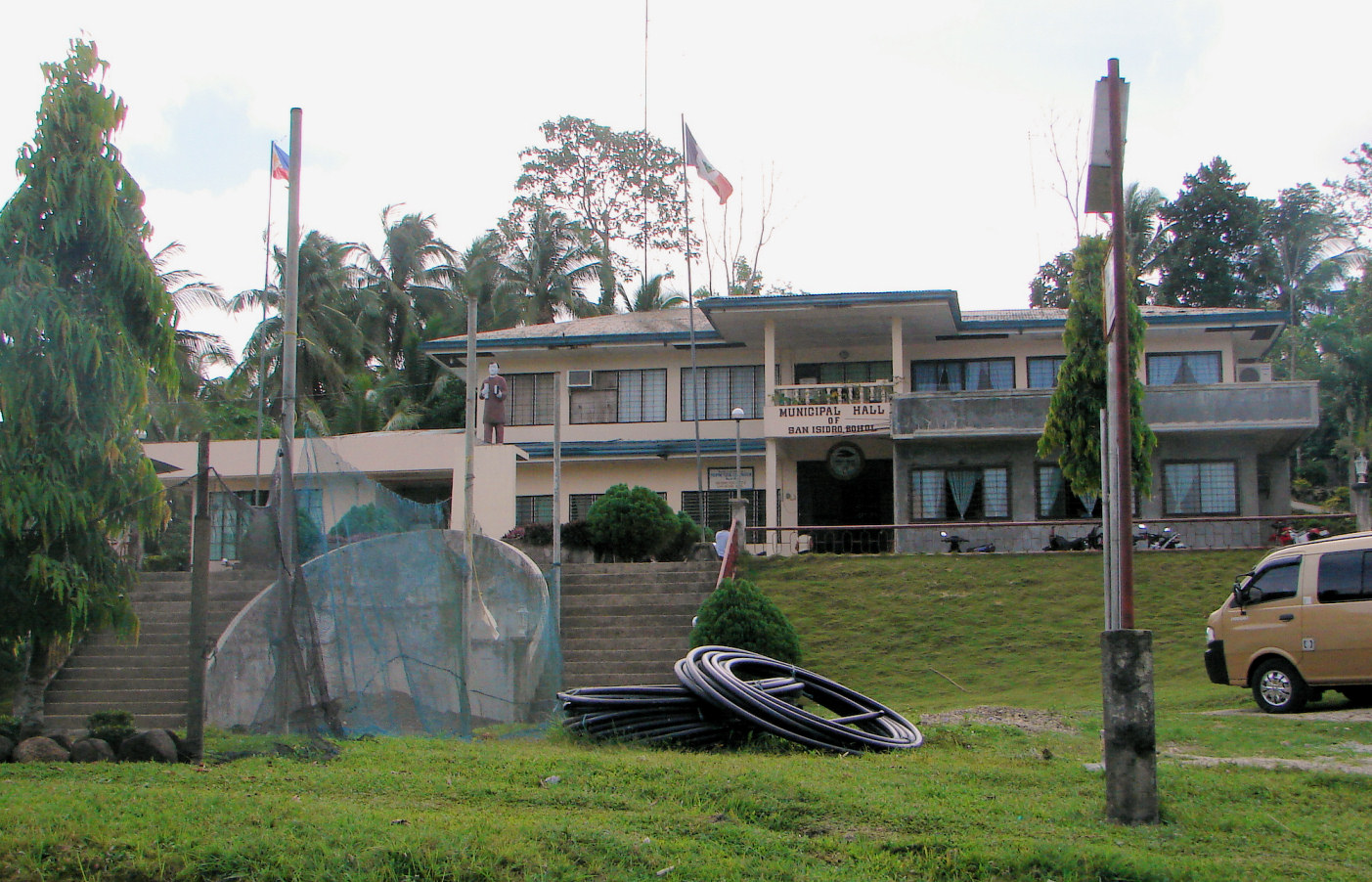
- Municipal Hall of San Isidro

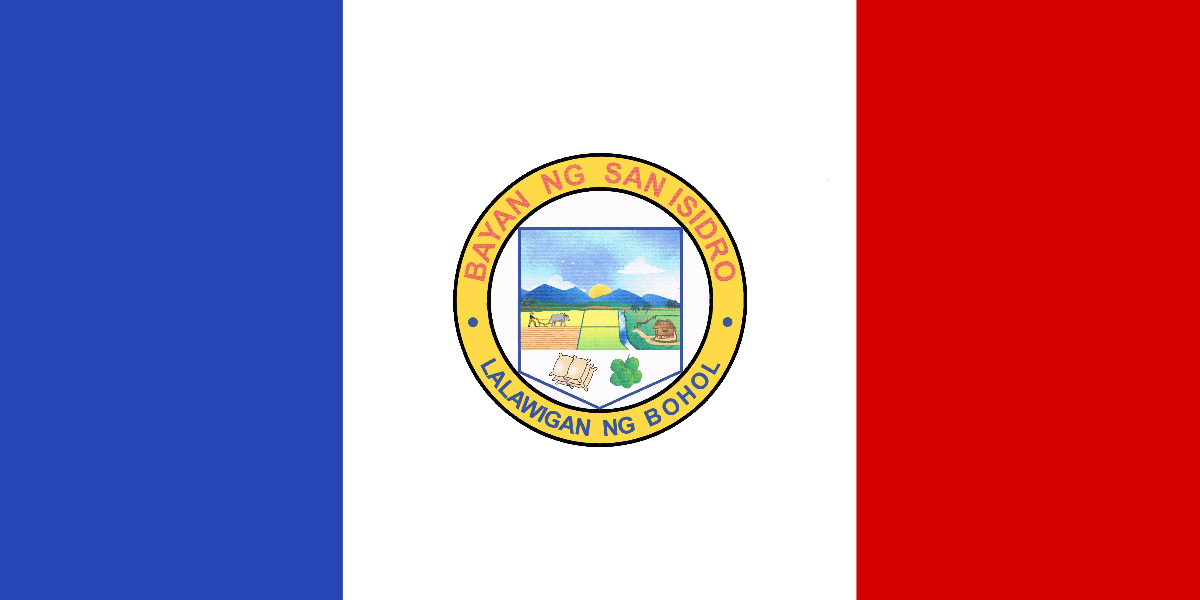
- Flag

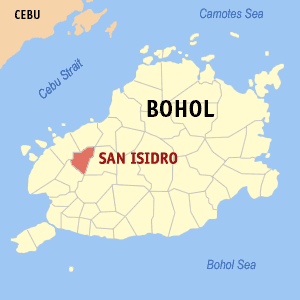
- Map of Bohol with San Isidro highlighted
- Interactive map of San Isidro
- Location within the Philippines
- Coordinates: 9°48′N 124°18′E
- Country: Philippines
- Region: Central Visayas
- Province: Bohol
- District: 2nd district
- Founded: 21 June 1969
- Named for: St. Isidore the Laborer
- Barangays: 12 (see Barangays)

Government
  - Type: Sangguniang Bayan
  - Mayor: Diosdado N. Gementiza Jr.
  - Vice Mayor: Filemon R. Mantabote
  - Representative: Erico Aristotle C. Aumentado
  - Municipal Council: Members: Henston M. Sandigan; Zinas V. Arambala; Danilo B. Saligumba; Ruby M. Lurot; Clemen M. Jala; Jorge L. Cosmod; Jacinto B. Naraga; Lourdes R. Samuya
  - Electorate: 7,407 voters (2025)

Area
  - Total: 60.04 km^{2} (23.18 sq mi)
- Elevation: 220 m (720 ft)
- Highest elevation: 466 m (1,529 ft)
- Lowest elevation: 15 m (49 ft)

Population (2024 census)
  - Total: 10,228
  - Density: 170.4/km^{2} (441.2/sq mi)
  - Households: 2,380

Economy
  - Income class: 5th municipal income class
  - Poverty incidence: 20.65% (2023)
  - Revenue: ₱ 115.7 million (2024)
  - Assets: ₱ 203 million (2024)
  - Expenditure: ₱ 118.3 million (2024)
  - Liabilities: ₱ 20.16 million (2024)

Service provider
  - Electricity: Bohol 1 Electric Cooperative (BOHECO 1)
- Time zone: UTC+8 (PST)
- ZIP code: 6345
- PSGC: 071237000
- IDD : area code: +63 (0)38
- Native languages: Boholano dialect Cebuano; Tagalog

San Isidro, officially the Municipality of San Isidro (Cebuano: Munisipalidad sa San Isidro; Tagalog: Bayan ng San Isidro), is a municipality in the province of Bohol, Philippines. According to the 2024 census, it has a population of 10,228 people.

This town is quite unique because it is the only town covered by the 2nd District surrounded by towns of the 1st District. San Isidro is 31 kilometres (19 mi) from Tagbilaran.

The town of San Isidro, Bohol celebrates its feast on May 15, to honor the town patron Saint Isidore the Laborer.

== History ==
It was originally called Agbunan (derived after a bugang plant). Its territory was once under the jurisdiction of Catigbian, Antequera,Calape, and Tubigon.

During the Spanish colonial times, there was a man named Gaam (Gaom in some version), who was once a town official of Tubigon. He settled in Agbunan after he was summoned by the Alcalde-Mayor of Cebu about an incident of a prisoner whom he executed in the island of Ubay without a due process. Rather than going to Cebu and answer the summon, he staged a revolt against the Spanish government who was to arrest him, and he fled to the mountains of Agbunan, along with his followers, there he called himself a king and Laconia, a native of Baclayon, as his right hand.

Agbunan fell when the Spanish expeditionary forces launched an attack, descending from the mountains of Tan-awan, scattering almost 12 thousands of its residents deeper into the island's interior. By the time it was fully subdued, there were only 2 thousand inhabitants remained, which they were eventually absorbed under Calape, and later to Catigbian.

On June 21, 1969, the Municipality of San Isidro was officially established under Republic Act No. 5662 signed by-then President Ferdinand E. Marcos Sr.

== Geography ==
=== Barangays ===
San Isidro is politically subdivided into 12 barangays. Each barangay consists of puroks and some have sitios.

Currently, Barangay Poblacion is classified as urban and the rest are rural.

PSGC	Barangay	Population			±% p.a.	
		2024		2010		
071237002	Abehilan	6.1%	620	621	▾	−0.01%
071237014	Baryong Daan	2.9%	292	288	▴	0.10%
071237003	Baunos	4.2%	432	479	▾	−0.71%
071237005	Cabanugan	9.3%	949	892	▴	0.43%
071237006	Caimbang	6.2%	638	668	▾	−0.32%
071237007	Cambansag	7.0%	718	683	▴	0.35%
071237008	Candungao	9.0%	922	1,130	▾	−1.40%
071237009	Cansague Norte	3.9%	404	414	▾	−0.17%
071237010	Cansague Sur	5.7%	581	565	▴	0.19%
071237011	Causwagan Sur	5.7%	580	613	▾	−0.38%
071237012	Masonoy	4.6%	473	547	▾	−1.00%
071237013	Poblacion	20.9%	2,135	2,225	▾	−0.29%
	Total		10,228	9,125	▴	0.79%

=== Climate ===
Climate data for San Isidro, Bohol
Month	Jan	Feb	Mar	Apr	May	Jun	Jul	Aug	Sep	Oct	Nov	Dec	Year
Mean daily maximum °C (°F)	26 (79)	27 (81)	28 (82)	30 (86)	30 (86)	29 (84)	28 (82)	29 (84)	29 (84)	28 (82)	27 (81)	27 (81)	28 (83)
Mean daily minimum °C (°F)	22 (72)	21 (70)	21 (70)	22 (72)	23 (73)	23 (73)	22 (72)	22 (72)	22 (72)	22 (72)	22 (72)	22 (72)	22 (72)
Average precipitation mm (inches)	98 (3.9)	82 (3.2)	96 (3.8)	71 (2.8)	104 (4.1)	129 (5.1)	101 (4.0)	94 (3.7)	99 (3.9)	135 (5.3)	174 (6.9)	143 (5.6)	1,326 (52.3)
Average rainy days	18.0	14.1	17.1	16.8	23.7	25.7	25.8	23.3	24.2	25.9	24.0	20.6	259.2
Source: Meteoblue

== Demographics ==
Population census of San Isidro
Year	Pop.	±% p.a.
1970	6,923	—
1975	7,281	+1.02%
1980	7,369	+0.24%
1990	7,840	+0.62%
1995	7,548	−0.71%
2000	9,106	+4.10%
2007	9,176	+0.11%
2010	9,125	−0.20%
2015	8,744	−0.81%
2020	9,909	+2.67%
2024	10,228	+0.76%
Source: Philippine Statistics Authority

== Economy ==
Poverty incidence of San Isidro (%)

Source: Philippine Statistics Authority

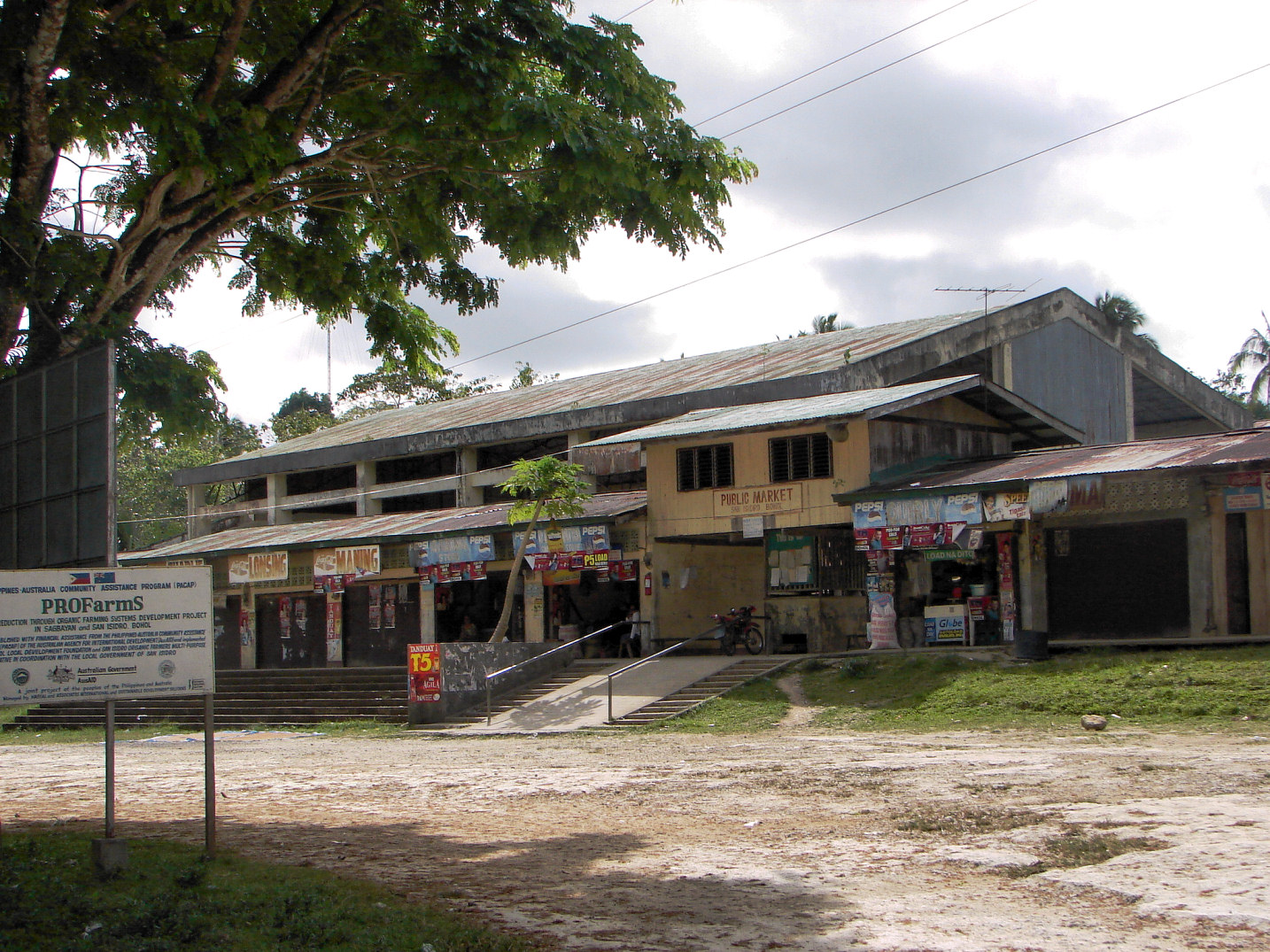
Public market
