= Lila, Bohol =

Municipality in Bohol, Philippines

Lila
- Municipality
- Municipality of Lila
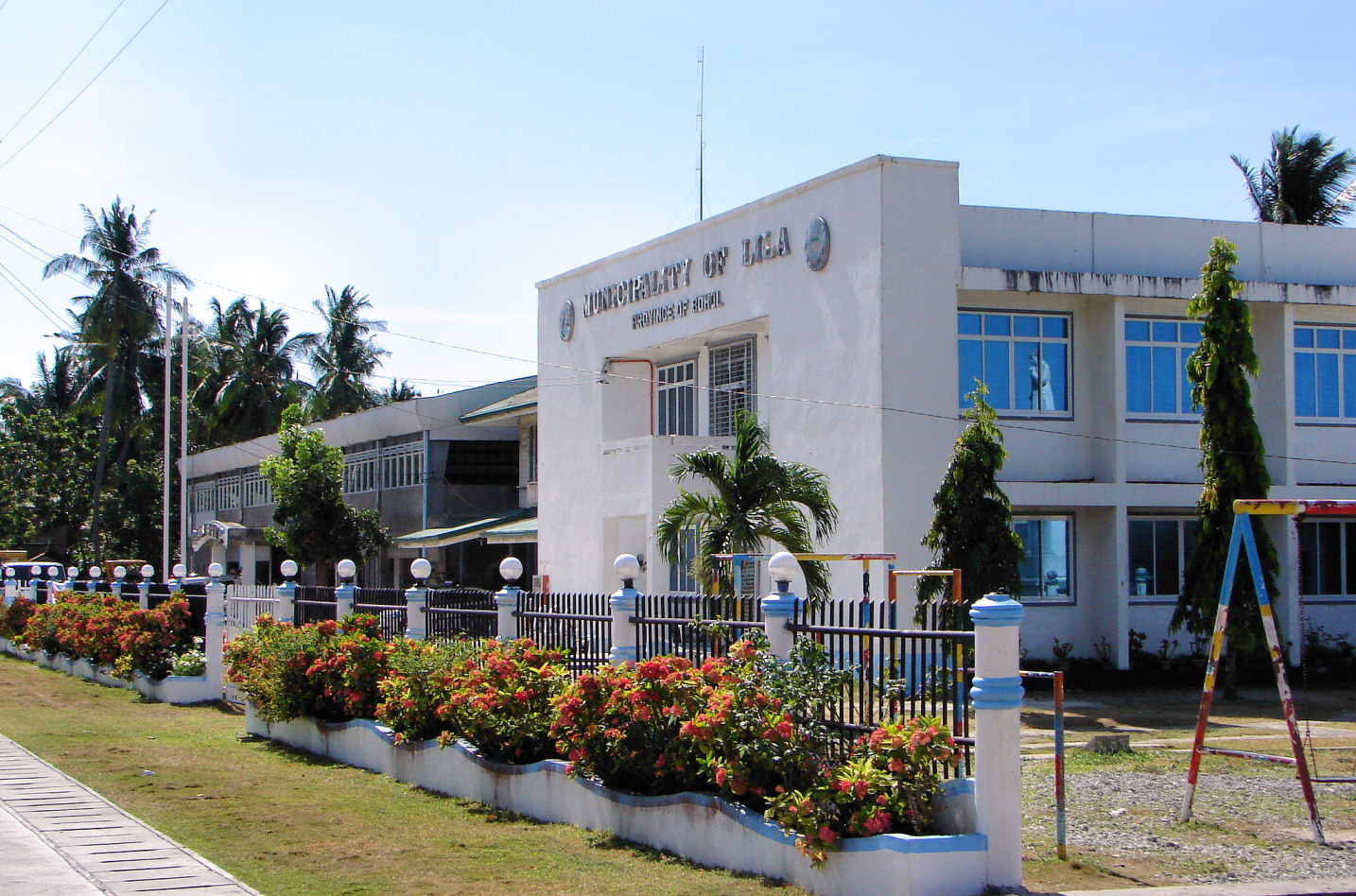
- Municipal building of Lila

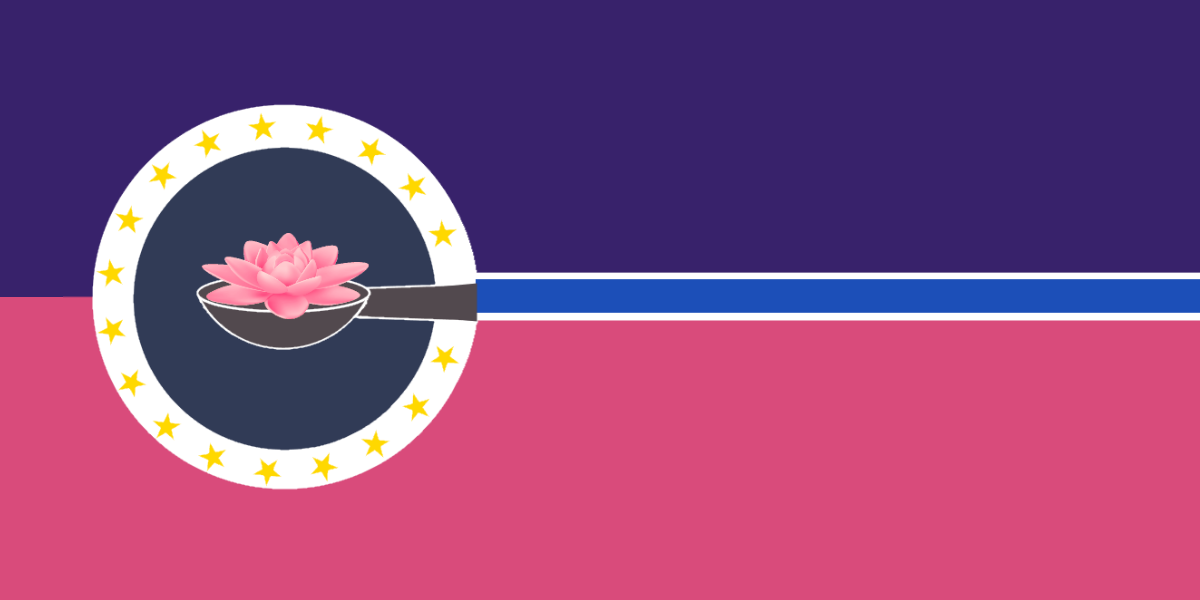
- Flag

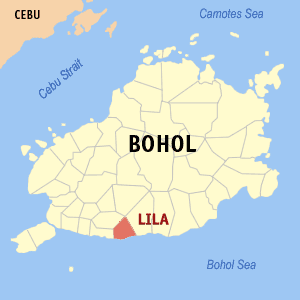
- Map of Bohol with Lila highlighted
- Interactive map of Lila
- Location within the Philippines
- Coordinates: 9°36′N 124°06′E
- Country: Philippines
- Region: Central Visayas
- Province: Bohol
- District: 3rd district
- Founded: 1 January 1915
- Barangays: 18 (see Barangays)

Government
  - Type: Sangguniang Bayan
  - Mayor: Arturo A. Piollo II
  - Vice Mayor: Regina C. Salazar
  - Representative: Kristine Alexie B. Tutor
  - Municipal Council: Members: Roger Mark M. Oculam; Meghan S. Japson; Frederick H. Raut; Gifredo L. Hampac; Melagros L. Lagria; Eugene C. Cahiles; Fabian L. Oculam; Edilberto T. Laganson; NB COMELEC
  - Electorate: 7,910 voters (2025)

Area
  - Total: 40.50 km^{2} (15.64 sq mi)
- Elevation: 99 m (325 ft)
- Highest elevation: 501 m (1,644 ft)
- Lowest elevation: 0 m (0 ft)

Population (2024 census)
  - Total: 11,450
  - Density: 282.7/km^{2} (732.2/sq mi)
  - Households: 2,295

Economy
  - Income class: 4th municipal income class
  - Poverty incidence: 24.94% (2023)
  - Revenue: ₱ 135.9 million (2024)
  - Assets: ₱ 305.2 million (2024)
  - Expenditure: ₱ 60.52 million (2024)
  - Liabilities: ₱ 42.56 million (2024)

Service provider
  - Electricity: Bohol 1 Electric Cooperative (BOHECO 1)
- Time zone: UTC+8 (PST)
- ZIP code: 6304
- PSGC: 071227000
- IDD : area code: +63 (0)38
- Native languages: Boholano dialect Cebuano; Tagalog
- Website: www.lila-bohol.gov.ph

Lila, officially the Municipality of Lila (Cebuano: Munisipalidad sa Lila; Tagalog: Bayan ng Lila), is a municipality in the province of Bohol, Philippines. According to the 2024 census, it has a population of 11,450 people.

The town of Lila, Bohol celebrates its fiesta on October 7, to honor the town patron the Holy Rosary.

== History ==
The coastal town of Lila once belonged to the Municipality of Dimiao. It was composed of the barrios of the municipalities of Loay and Dimiao. In 1899, during the Spanish–American War, the municipal building, the church and neighboring houses were razed to the ground and burned. Thus, no records can be shown stating when Lila was annexed to the town of Dimiao. However, the Augustinian mission in Bohol has written that Lila was a separate municipality in 1879, with a population of 4,023.

Later, a town was founded and part of the municipality was annexed back to Loay and part to Dimiao. From that time up to 1914, the municipal government of Lila ceased to function.

However, in 1915 the municipality of Lila was re-established, with Celestino Oculam as Mayor. That part of Lila annexed to Dimiao and those annexed to Loay were returned and formed the new municipality of Lila.

For the church, it was initially administered alternately by a priest stationed in Loay and Dimiao due to the scarcity of priests. It was only in 1921 that the priest of Lila had a residential parish. The church and the convent built then were only made of light materials.

In 1915, during the administration of Fr. Narciso Maglasang, the present church was built. The convent was constructed under the administration of Fr. Miguel Ortega some time in the year 1941.

After World War II, the town prospered.

== Geography ==
Lila is 29 kilometres (18 mi) from Tagbilaran. It is bound to the east by Dimiao, to the west by Loay, and to the north by Loboc.

=== Barangays ===
Lila is politically subdivided into 18 barangays. Each barangay consists of puroks and some have sitios.

Of these barangays, there are 10 which considered coastal and 8 inland.

PSGC	Barangay	Population			±% p.a.	
		2024		2010		
071227001	Banban	8.4%	967	918	▴	0.36%
071227002	Bonkokan Ilaya	5.8%	660	691	▾	−0.32%
071227003	Bonkokan Ubos	6.9%	788	775	▴	0.12%
071227004	Calvario	8.4%	959	919	▴	0.30%
071227005	Candulang	3.4%	384	378	▴	0.11%
071227006	Catugasan	3.6%	408	431	▾	−0.38%
071227007	Cayupo	1.9%	223	214	▴	0.29%
071227008	Cogon	4.2%	480	460	▴	0.30%
071227009	Jambawan	5.3%	605	575	▴	0.35%
071227010	La Fortuna	6.1%	700	677	▴	0.23%
071227011	Lomanoy	5.2%	591	616	▾	−0.29%
071227012	Macalingan	5.0%	568	558	▴	0.12%
071227013	Malinao East	7.4%	842	800	▴	0.36%
071227014	Malinao West	2.0%	230	243	▾	−0.38%
071227015	Nagsulay	9.3%	1,070	1,031	▴	0.26%
071227016	Poblacion	10.4%	1,195	1,163	▴	0.19%
071227017	Taug	5.6%	642	635	▴	0.08%
071227018	Tiguis	8.3%	945	901	▴	0.33%
	Total		11,450	11,985	▾	−0.32%

=== Climate ===
Climate data for Lila, Bohol
Month	Jan	Feb	Mar	Apr	May	Jun	Jul	Aug	Sep	Oct	Nov	Dec	Year
Mean daily maximum °C (°F)	28 (82)	29 (84)	30 (86)	31 (88)	31 (88)	30 (86)	30 (86)	30 (86)	30 (86)	29 (84)	29 (84)	29 (84)	30 (85)
Mean daily minimum °C (°F)	23 (73)	22 (72)	23 (73)	23 (73)	24 (75)	25 (77)	24 (75)	24 (75)	24 (75)	24 (75)	23 (73)	23 (73)	24 (74)
Average precipitation mm (inches)	102 (4.0)	85 (3.3)	91 (3.6)	75 (3.0)	110 (4.3)	141 (5.6)	121 (4.8)	107 (4.2)	111 (4.4)	144 (5.7)	169 (6.7)	139 (5.5)	1,395 (55.1)
Average rainy days	18.6	14.8	16.5	16.7	23.9	26.4	25.6	24.1	24.4	26.3	23.7	20.5	261.5
Source: Meteoblue

== Demographics ==
Population census of Lila
Year	Pop.	±% p.a.
1903	5,243	—
1918	6,514	+1.46%
1939	7,981	+0.97%
1948	8,701	+0.96%
1960	7,693	−1.02%
1970	8,645	+1.17%
1975	8,728	+0.19%
1980	8,278	−1.05%
1990	8,556	+0.33%
1995	9,014	+0.98%
2000	10,322	+2.95%
2007	10,801	+0.63%
2010	11,985	+3.86%
2015	12,257	+0.43%
2020	12,240	−0.03%
2024	11,450	−1.59%
Source: Philippine Statistics Authority

== Economy ==
Poverty incidence of Lila (%)

Source: Philippine Statistics Authority

== Gallery ==
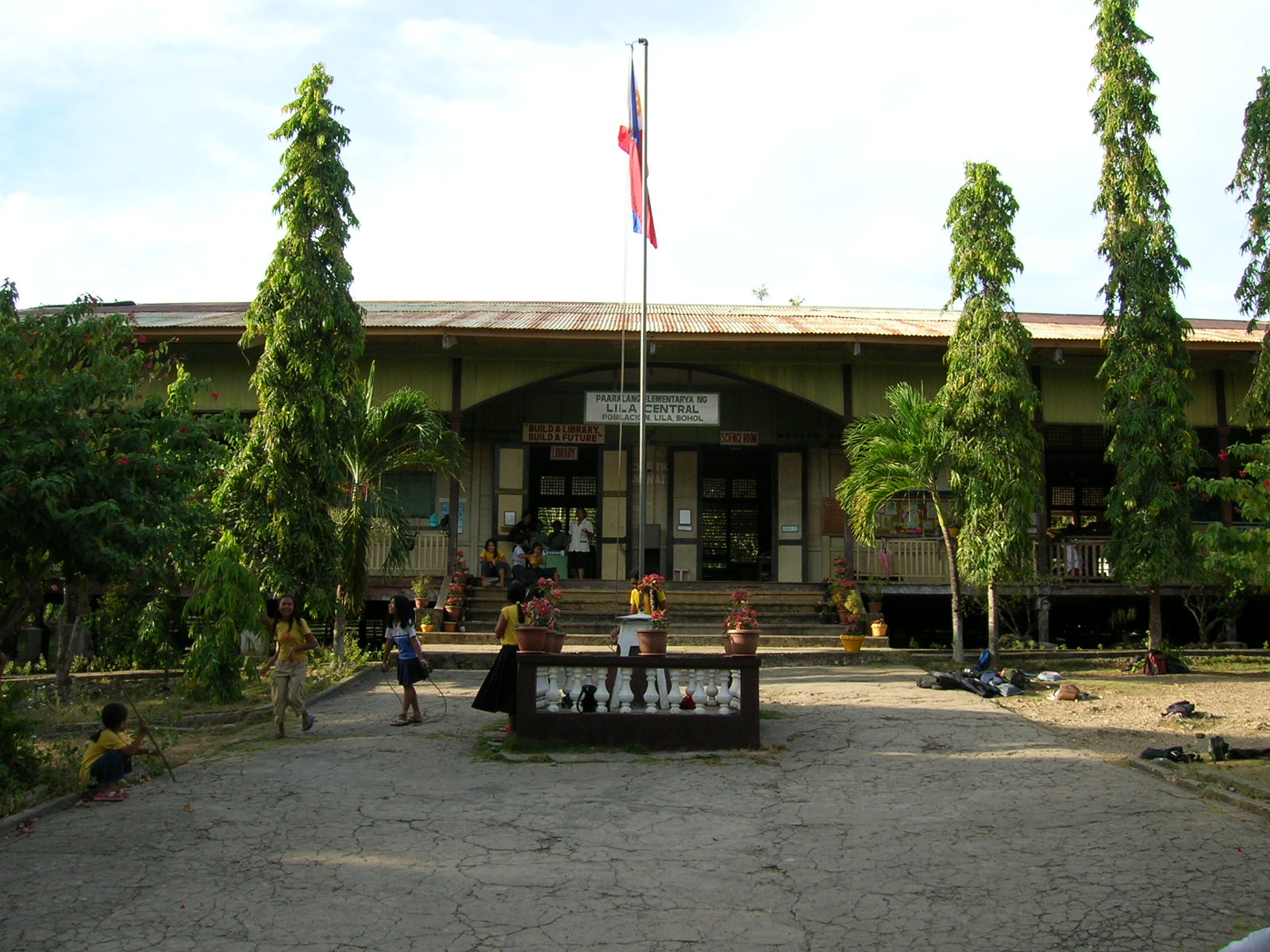
Elementary school in Poblacion, Lila

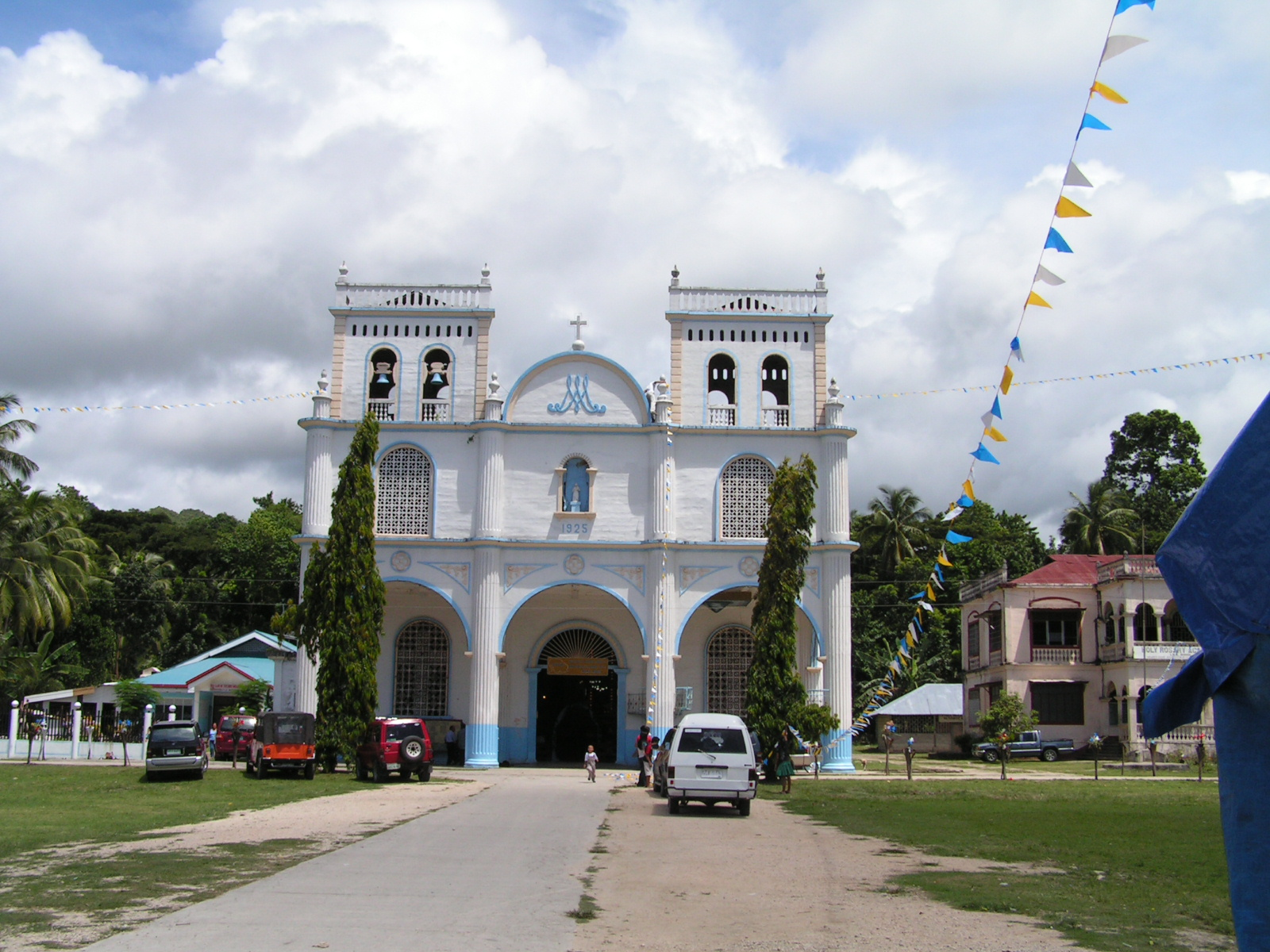
Catholic Church

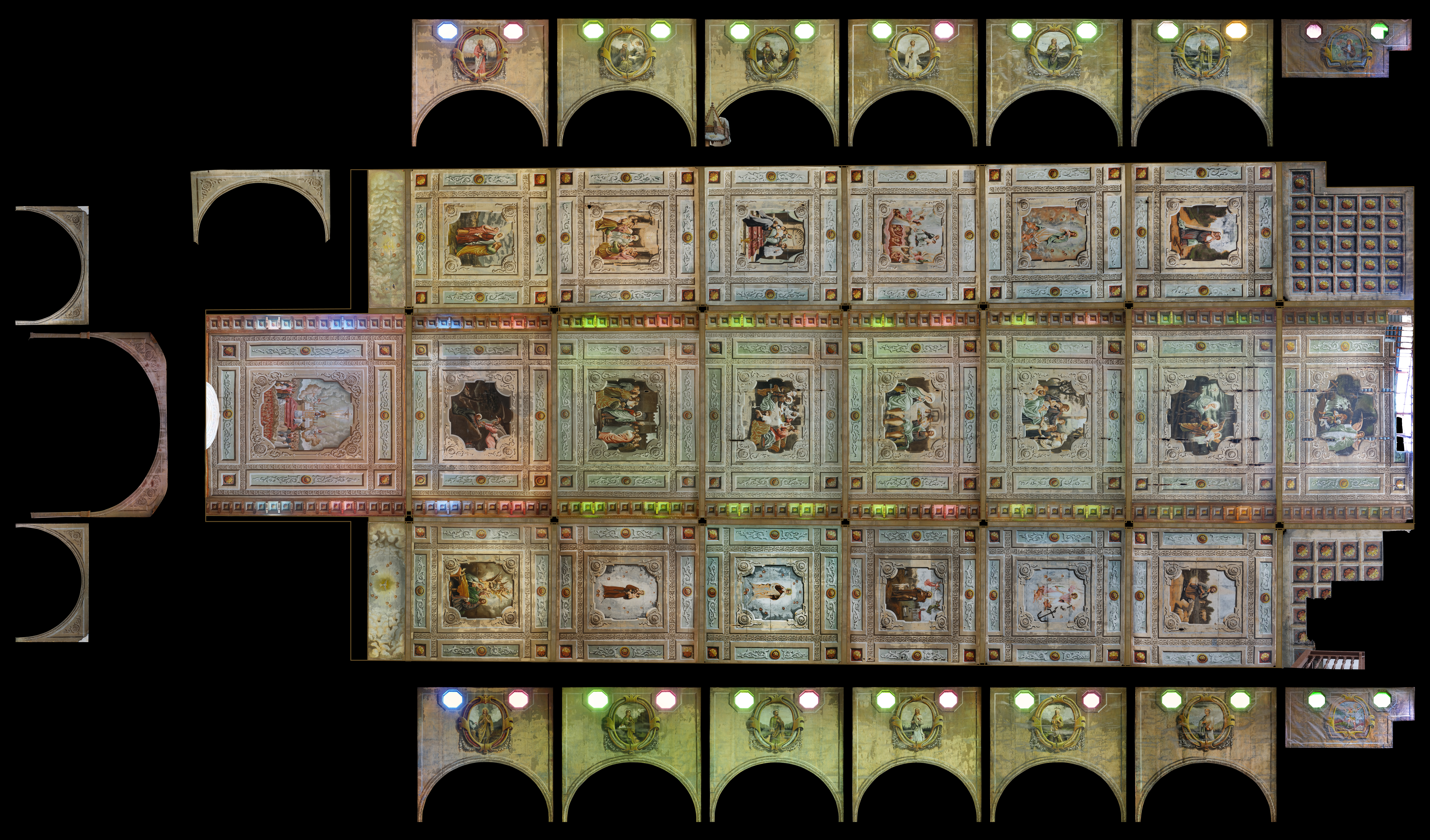
Lila Church ceiling
