= Sikatuna, Bohol =

Municipality in Bohol, Philippines

Sikatuna
- Municipality
- Municipality of Sikatuna
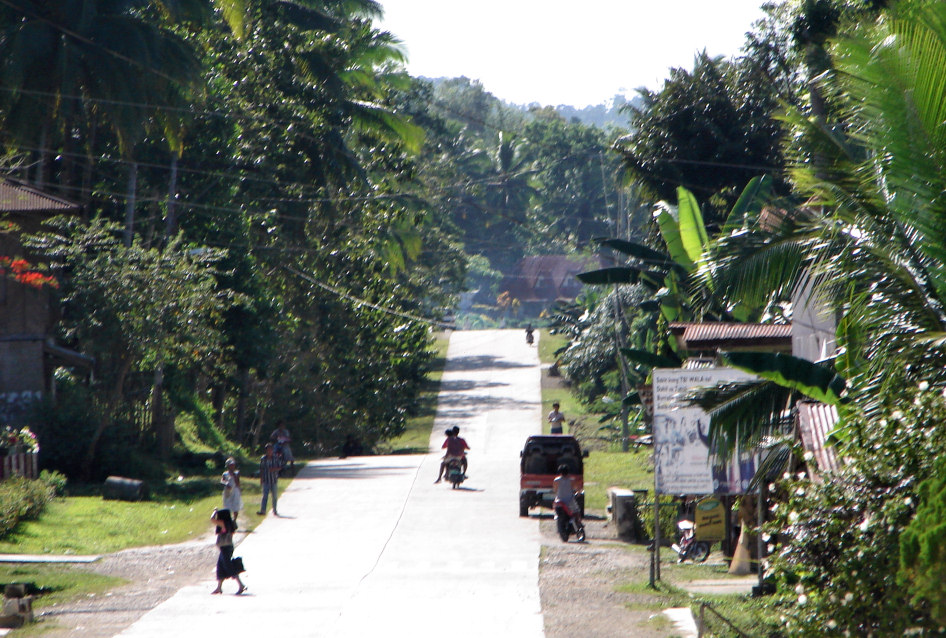
- Sikatuna, Bohol

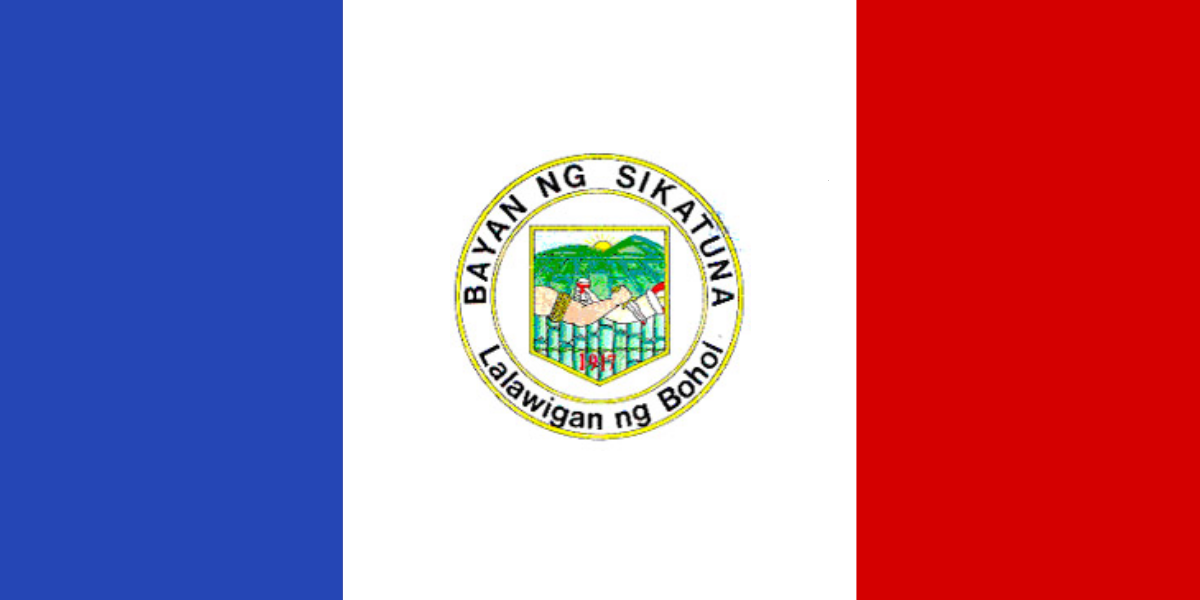
- Flag Seal

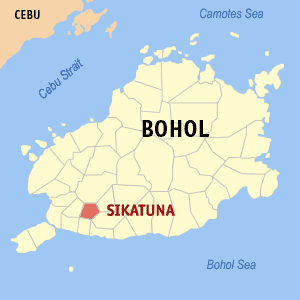
- Map of Bohol with Sikatuna highlighted
- Interactive map of Sikatuna
- Location within the Philippines
- Coordinates: 9°41′N 123°58′E
- Country: Philippines
- Region: Central Visayas
- Province: Bohol
- District: 1st district
- Founded: 5 December 1917
- Named for: Datu Sikatuna
- Barangays: 10 (see Barangays)

Government
  - Type: Sangguniang Bayan
  - Mayor: Justiniana L. Ellorimo
  - Vice Mayor: Olimpio B. Calimpusan
  - Representative: John Geesnell Yap
  - Municipal Council: Members: Melecio Q. Baugbog; Mylene A. Jala; Danilo D. Palgan; Constancio Q. Rule; Roger B. Ocho; Constancio Q. Handumon; Alex T. Pangan; Basilio J. Tudtod
  - Electorate: 5,316 voters (2025)

Area
  - Total: 38.22 km^{2} (14.76 sq mi)
- Elevation: 125 m (410 ft)
- Highest elevation: 380 m (1,250 ft)
- Lowest elevation: 49 m (161 ft)

Population (2024 census)
  - Total: 7,031
  - Density: 184.0/km^{2} (476.5/sq mi)
  - Households: 1,712

Economy
  - Income class: 5th municipal income class
  - Poverty incidence: 12.12% (2023)
  - Revenue: ₱ 108.5 million (2024)
  - Assets: ₱ 287.4 million (2024)
  - Expenditure: ₱ 107.8 million (2024)
  - Liabilities: ₱ 34.49 million (2024)

Service provider
  - Electricity: Bohol 1 Electric Cooperative (BOHECO 1)
- Time zone: UTC+8 (PST)
- ZIP code: 6338
- PSGC: 071241000
- IDD : area code: +63 (0)38
- Native languages: Boholano dialect Cebuano; Tagalog

Sikatuna, officially the Municipality of Sikatuna (Cebuano: Munisipalidad sa Sikatuna; Tagalog: Bayan ng Sikatuna), is a municipality in the province of Bohol, Philippines. According to the 2024 census, it has a population of 7,031 people.

The town of Sikatuna, Bohol celebrates its feast on June 12–13, to honor the town patron Saint Anthony De Padua.

== Etymology ==
The town is named after Datu Sikatuna, the ancient chieftain of Bohol, although there is no evidence he lived in the area.

== History ==
Sikatuna was formerly a part of the towns of Baclayon and Alburquerque. While part of Baclayon, Sikatuna was known as barrio Cambojod. Once Alburquerque became a town, Sikatuna was made a part of its new territory and given the name Cornago. Sikatuna became its own town in 1917. The ten barangays that now comprise Sikatuna were taken from three neighboring old municipalities: Alburquerque, Loboc, and Balilihan. In the original municipal ordinance converting barrio Cornago into a municipality, the municipal boundary was defined as barrio Cornago plus four northern barrios of Alburquerque: Libjo, Abucay Sur, Abucay Norte, and Can-agong. However, Senator Jose A. Clarin helped increase the territorial boundary by taking two barrios from Loboc: Cambuac Sur and Cambuac Norte; and two barrios from Balilihan: Badiang and Bahay-bahay. Cornago was divided into Poblacion I and Poblacion II.

=== World War II ===
During the Japanese occupation of the Philippines, Japanese forces established a garrison at the municipal building and installed a puppet mayor. During this time, Sikatuna became a haven for evacuees, both from neighboring towns and from nearby Cebu. The most famous evacuee was Don Mariano Jesus Cuenco who, after the war, became Senator and later, Secretary of Public Works. In 1945, Sikatuna was entered by Philippine Commonwealth Army soldiers and Boholano guerrillas fought against the Japanese Imperial forces during the Second Battle of Bohol.

== Geography ==
Located 17 kilometres (11 mi) from Tagbilaran, it has a total area of 3,822 hectares (9,440 acres), making it the smallest municipality in Bohol.

=== Barangays ===
Sikatuna politically subdivided into 10 barangays. Each barangay consists of puroks and some have sitios.

Currently, Barangay Poblacion I is classified as urban and the rest are rural.

PSGC	Barangay	Population			±% p.a.		Area		PD 2024	
		2024		2010			ha	acre	/km^{2}	/sq mi
071241001	Abucay Norte	7.3%	516	460	▴	0.80%	149	368	350	900
071241002	Abucay Sur	9.5%	666	582	▴	0.94%	194	479	340	890
071241003	Badiang	8.5%	599	605	▾	−0.07%	409	1,011	150	380
071241004	Bahaybahay	6.1%	430	396	▴	0.57%	290	717	150	380
071241005	Cambuac Norte	9.8%	688	632	▴	0.59%	421	1,040	160	420
071241006	Cambuac Sur	16.7%	1,174	1,173	▴	0.01%	297	734	400	1,000
071241007	Canagong	9.0%	635	689	▾	−0.56%	299	739	210	550
071241008	Libjo	6.8%	480	466	▴	0.21%	310	766	150	400
071241009	Poblacion I	16.2%	1,141	1,009	▴	0.86%	202	499	560	1,500
071241010	Poblacion II	5.6%	397	368	▴	0.53%	251	620	160	410
	Total		7,031	6,380	▴	0.68%	3,822	9,444	180	14

== Climate ==
Climate data for Sikatuna, Bohol
Month	Jan	Feb	Mar	Apr	May	Jun	Jul	Aug	Sep	Oct	Nov	Dec	Year
Mean daily maximum °C (°F)	28 (82)	28 (82)	29 (84)	31 (88)	31 (88)	30 (86)	29 (84)	29 (84)	29 (84)	29 (84)	28 (82)	28 (82)	29 (84)
Mean daily minimum °C (°F)	22 (72)	22 (72)	22 (72)	23 (73)	24 (75)	24 (75)	24 (75)	24 (75)	24 (75)	23 (73)	23 (73)	22 (72)	23 (74)
Average precipitation mm (inches)	102 (4.0)	85 (3.3)	91 (3.6)	75 (3.0)	110 (4.3)	141 (5.6)	121 (4.8)	107 (4.2)	111 (4.4)	144 (5.7)	169 (6.7)	139 (5.5)	1,395 (55.1)
Average rainy days	18.6	14.8	16.5	16.7	23.9	26.4	25.6	24.1	24.4	26.3	23.7	20.5	261.5
Source: Meteoblue

== Demographics ==
Population census of Sikatuna
Year	Pop.	±% p.a.
1918	4,452	—
1939	4,600	+0.16%
1948	4,713	+0.27%
1960	4,781	+0.12%
1970	4,658	−0.26%
1975	5,169	+2.11%
1980	5,244	+0.29%
1990	5,525	+0.52%
1995	6,030	+1.65%
2000	6,602	+1.96%
2007	6,335	−0.57%
2010	6,380	+0.26%
2015	6,726	+1.01%
2020	6,906	+0.56%
2024	7,031	+0.43%
Source: Philippine Statistics Authority

== Economy ==
Poverty incidence of Sikatuna (%)

Source: Philippine Statistics Authority

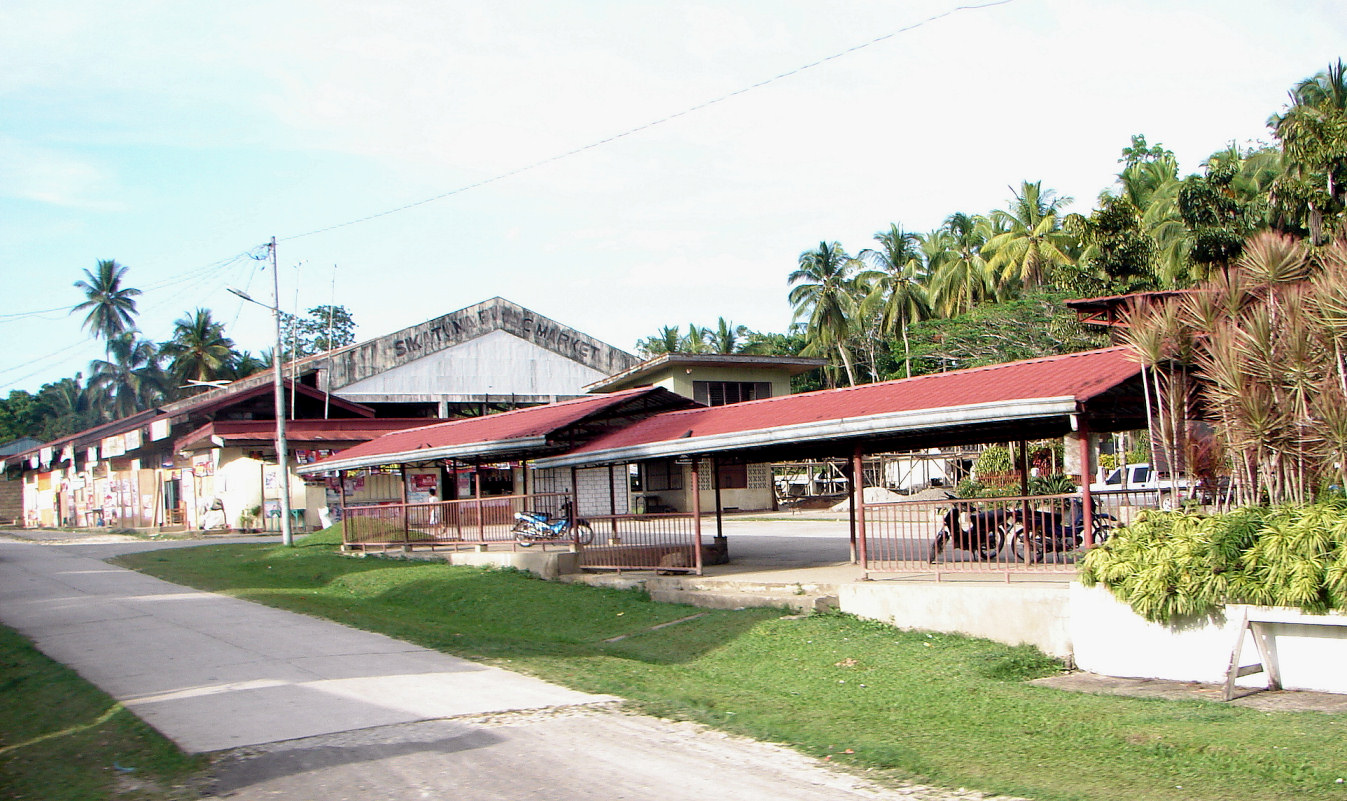
Public market of Sikatuna
