= Bilangbilangan Island =

Island in Cebu Strait, Philippines

Isla sa Bilangbilangan
- Location within Visayas, Philippines Location within Philippines

Geography
- Coordinates: 9.9875°N 123.8822°E
- Adjacent to: Cebu Strait
- Area: 0.01 km^{2} (0.0039 sq mi)

Administration
- Philippines
- Region: Central Visayas
- Province: Bohol
- Municipality: Tubigon

Demographics
- Population: 401 (2024)
- Pop. density: 40,100/km^{2} (103900/sq mi)
- Ethnic groups: Cebuano

Bilangbilangan is a small island in the Philippines, located in Cebu Strait, a body of water between the islands of Bohol and Cebu. The island is locally administered by Barangay Bilangbilangan, which is under the jurisdiction of the municipality of Tubigon, Bohol. It is around 9 km (5.6 mi) northwest of the port of Tubigon. Bilangbilangan is one of the string of islands located in the Danajon Bank, the only double barrier reef in the Philippines, which is known to be rich in marine resources. Residents in the island are fisherfolks that supply seafoods to the markets in nearby Metro Cebu. With an area of around only one hectare (2.5 acres) and a population of 401, Bilangbilangan has a very high population density, one of the densest populated islands in the country.

There is another island off the coast in the town of Bien Unido in the eastern side of Bohol, which is similarly named Bilangbilangan. People refer this island as Bilangbilangan East to distinguish it from the island in Tubigon.

== Education ==
The island has one public school, Bilangbilangan Elementary School.

== Utilities ==
Electricity

A diesel power plant provides electricity in Bilangbilangan. The facility is operated by the National Power Corporation - Small Power Utilities Group.

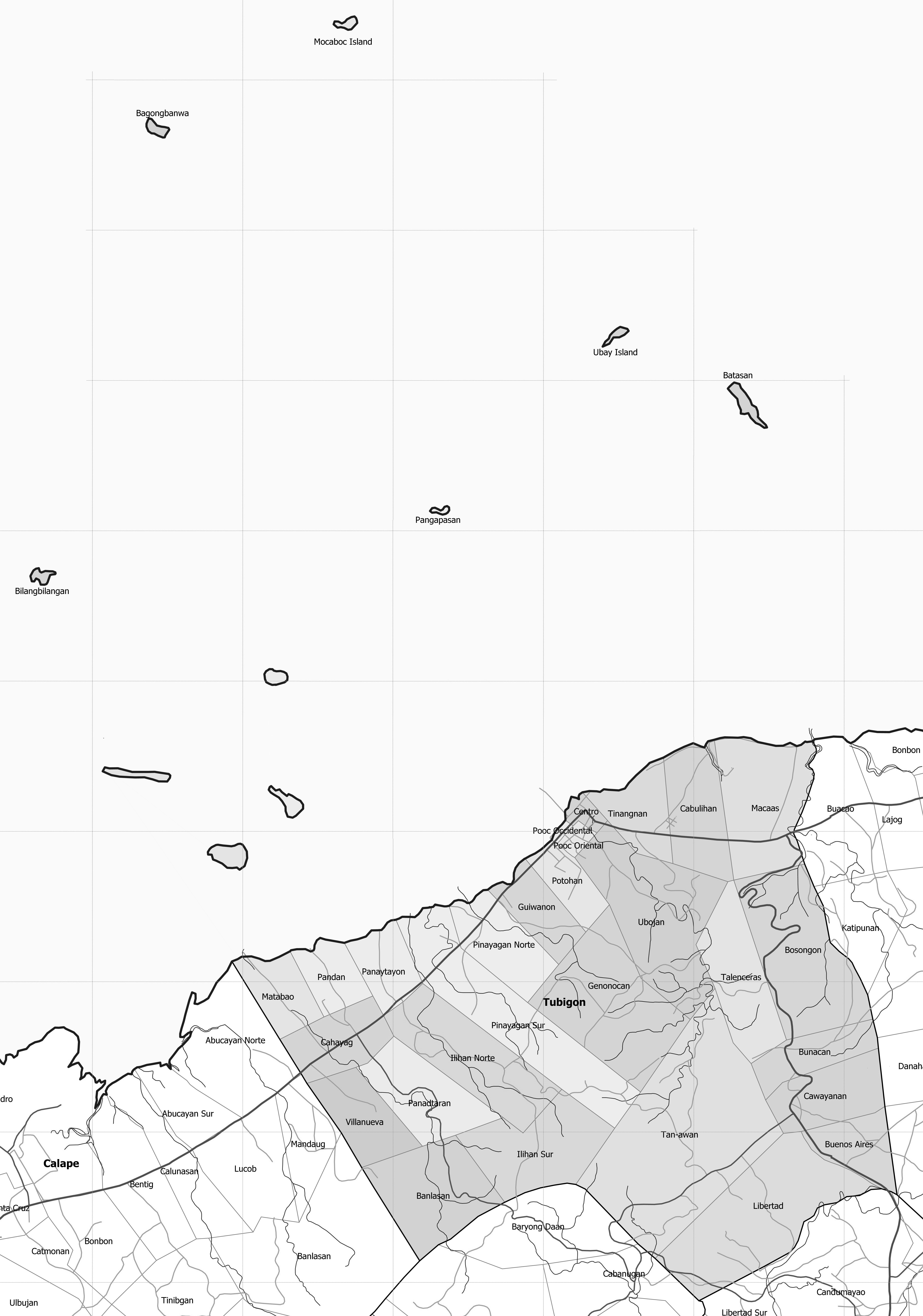
Map of Tubigon and Bilangbilangan Island is located at the leftmost part

== Current threats ==
Aside from strong typhoons that threatEN the island and the rest of the Philippines, the island seems to have submerged after the 7.2 magnitude 2013 Bohol Earthquake in October, 2013. The earthquake caused the lowering of the ground surface, known as ground subsidence or settling. Because of this, plus the effects of climate change, during high tide, seawater floods the whole island of Bilangbilangan. This extreme sea level rise has greatly impacted the people of the island. The nearby islands, such as Ubay Island, Pangapasan and Batasan have also experienced the same tribulation. The US Geological Survey has confirmed that since the earthquake, the islands in the Cebu Strait have flooded to a depth of up to 43 cm (17 in) at high tide. Although the government has offered a relocation program, many locals don't want to leave, instead choosing to stay on the island since their way of life depends on fishing.

== Transport ==
There are no regular or scheduled trips to Bilangbilangan, however there are available chartered motorized bangkas that travel between the port of Tubigon and Bilangbilangan. The island can also be directly reached by bangka docked in Pasil Fish Port in Cebu City.

== See also ==
- List of islands by population density
