= Pangapasan Island =

Island in Cebu Strait, Philippines

Isla sa Pangapasan
- Location within Visayas, Philippines Location within Philippines

Geography
- Coordinates: 9°59′52″N 123°56′26″E
- Adjacent to: Cebu Strait
- Area: 2 ha (4.9 acres)
- Highest elevation: 2.24 m (7.35 ft)

Administration
- Philippines
- Region: Central Visayas
- Province: Bohol
- Municipality: Tubigon
- Barangay: Pangapasan

Demographics
- Population: 479 (2024)
- Pop. density: 23,950/km^{2} (62030/sq mi)
- Ethnic groups: Cebuano

Pangapasan is an island situated in the Cebu Strait, a narrow channel between the islands of Cebu and Bohol. Located around 5 km (3.1 mi) northwest from the coast of Bohol, Pangapasan is one of the chain of islands found in the only double barrier reef in the Philippines, the Danajon Bank. This natural ecosystem is rich in marine biodiversity. Most of the resident's livelihood depends on fishing and they sell seafood to nearby markets in Bohol and Metro Cebu.

== Government ==
The island is locally administered by Barangay Pangapasan and under the jurisdiction of the municipality of Tubigon, Bohol

== Demographics ==
Based on the recent 2024 census, the estimated total population of island is 479. The population density is 23,950 persons per square kilometers.

== Education ==
Pangapasan Island has one public elementary school, Pangapasan Elementary School.

== Utilities ==
Electricity

Electricity in Pangapasan Island is being generated by a diesel power station located in the island. The facility is operated by the NAPOCOR - Small Power Utilities Group. The Bohol I Electric Cooperative, Inc. is the distribution utility.

== Current Threats ==
The island has faced the worst tropical cyclone recently, which is Typhoon Rai, or known as Typhoon Odette in the Philippines. With climate change, more frequent and stronger typhoons are expected to make impact on the island.

The islands of the town of Tubigon, which includes Pangapasan, Batasan, Bilangbilangan and Ubay are experiencing constant flooding and the rising of the sea level especially during high tide. This is caused of the lowering of the surface of the ground or what is called subsidence. This happened after the 7.2 magnitude 2013 Bohol Earthquake.

The island of Pangapasan is the nearest to the main port of Tubigon, among the town's outlying island barangays. Thus, the island is close to the local nautical highway, where ships, including passenger high-speed crafts pass along the route. They create an enormous problem for the residents of Pangapasan, as these ferries create big waves that can be very damaging to houses and structures along the island's shoreline.

== See also ==
- List of islands by population density
