= Bagongbanwa Island =

Island in Cebu Strait, Philippines

Isla sa Bagongbanwa
- Location within Visayas, Philippines Location within Philippines

Geography
- Coordinates: 10°3′18″N 123°53′57″E
- Adjacent to: Cebu Strait
- Area: 0.05 km^{2} (0.019 sq mi)

Administration
- Philippines
- Region: Central Visayas
- Province: Bohol
- Municipality: Tubigon

Demographics
- Population: 1,109 (2024)
- Pop. density: 22,180/km^{2} (57450/sq mi)
- Ethnic groups: Cebuano

Bagongbanwa is an island located in the Cebu Strait in the Philippines. It is 13 km (8.1 mi) northwest from the island of Bohol. The island is under the administration of Barangay Bagongbanwa, municipality of Tubigon, Bohol. Bagongbanwa is one of the islands that form the Danajon Bank, the only double barrier reef in the country. Most of the residents are engaged in fishing. Based on the latest census, the population of the island is 1,109.

The island has an elementary and high school. Bagongbanwa has its own diesel power plant operated by NAPOCOR.

== See also ==
- List of islands by population density
