= Calape Church =

Roman Catholic church in Bohol, Philippines

- Saint Vincent Ferrer Parish Church; San Vicente Ferrer Parish Church
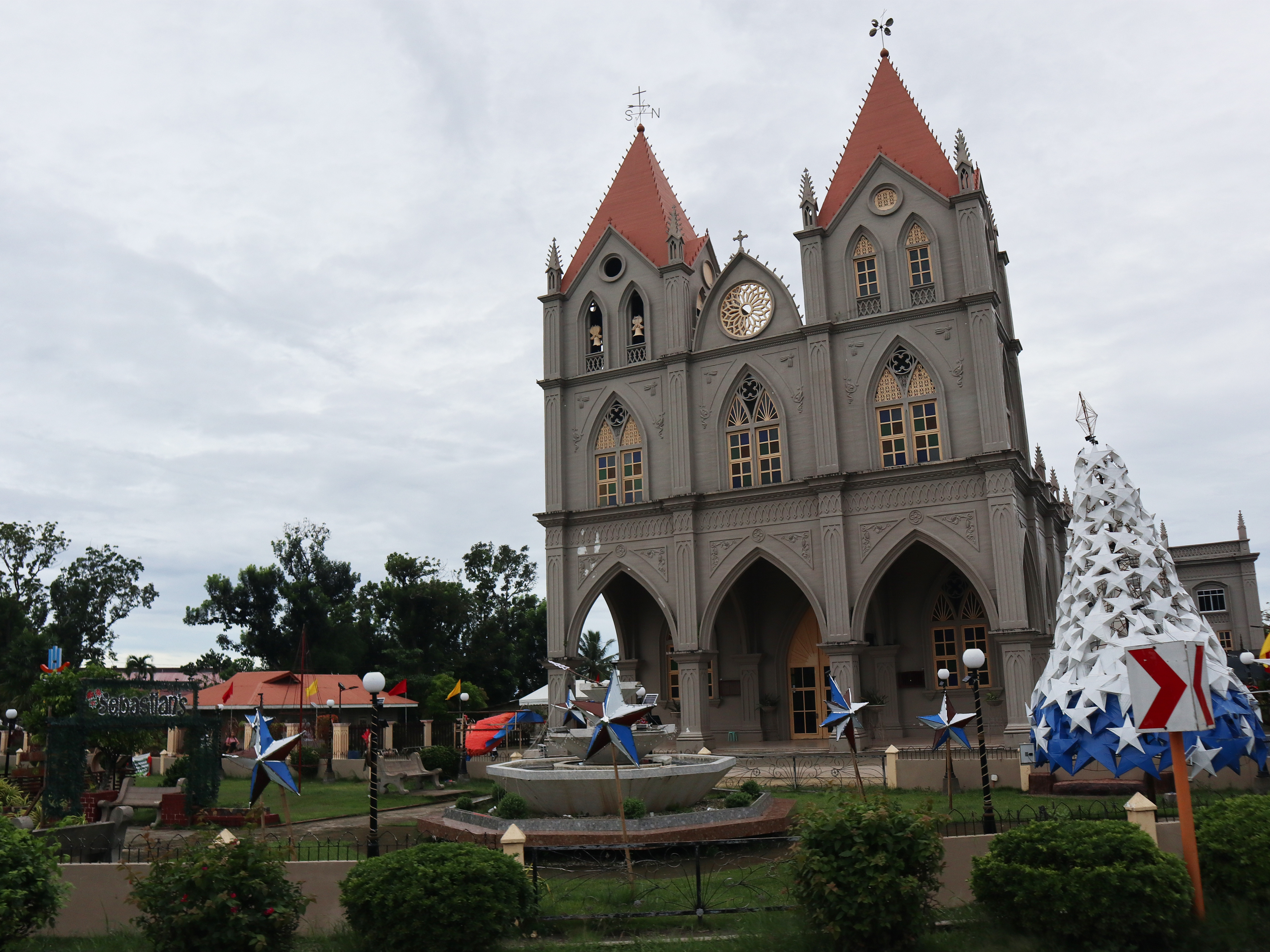
- Church facade in 2023

- Location in the Visayas Location in the Philippines
- 9°53′29″N 123°52′21″E
- Location: Poblacion, Calape, Bohol
- Country: Philippines
- Denomination: Roman Catholic

History
- Founded: 1802
- Dedication: Vincent Ferrer

Architecture
- Functional status: Active
- Heritage designation: National Cultural Treasure
- Designated: May 9, 2023
- Architectural type: Church building
- Style: Gothic
- Years built: 1933–1954

Administration
- Province: Cebu
- Diocese: Tagbilaran
- Deanery: St. Vincent Ferrer
- Parish: St. Vincent Ferrer

Clergy
- Vicar: Rev. Fr. Nilo Pana
- Priest: Rev. Fr. Johnson Inte

Saint Vincent Ferrer Parish Church, commonly known as Calape Church, is a Roman Catholic church in the municipality of Calape, Bohol, Philippines. It is under the jurisdiction of the Diocese of Tagbilaran. The church was established in 1802, the year the town of Calape was founded. Vincent Ferrer is the patron saint of the church and town. The church was first managed by Augustinian Recollect missionaries, and later turned over in 1898 to secular priests.

The church was damaged by the 7.2-magnitude 2013 Bohol earthquake and restored in 2019. It was designated in 2023 as a National Cultural Treasure by the National Museum of the Philippines.

== History ==
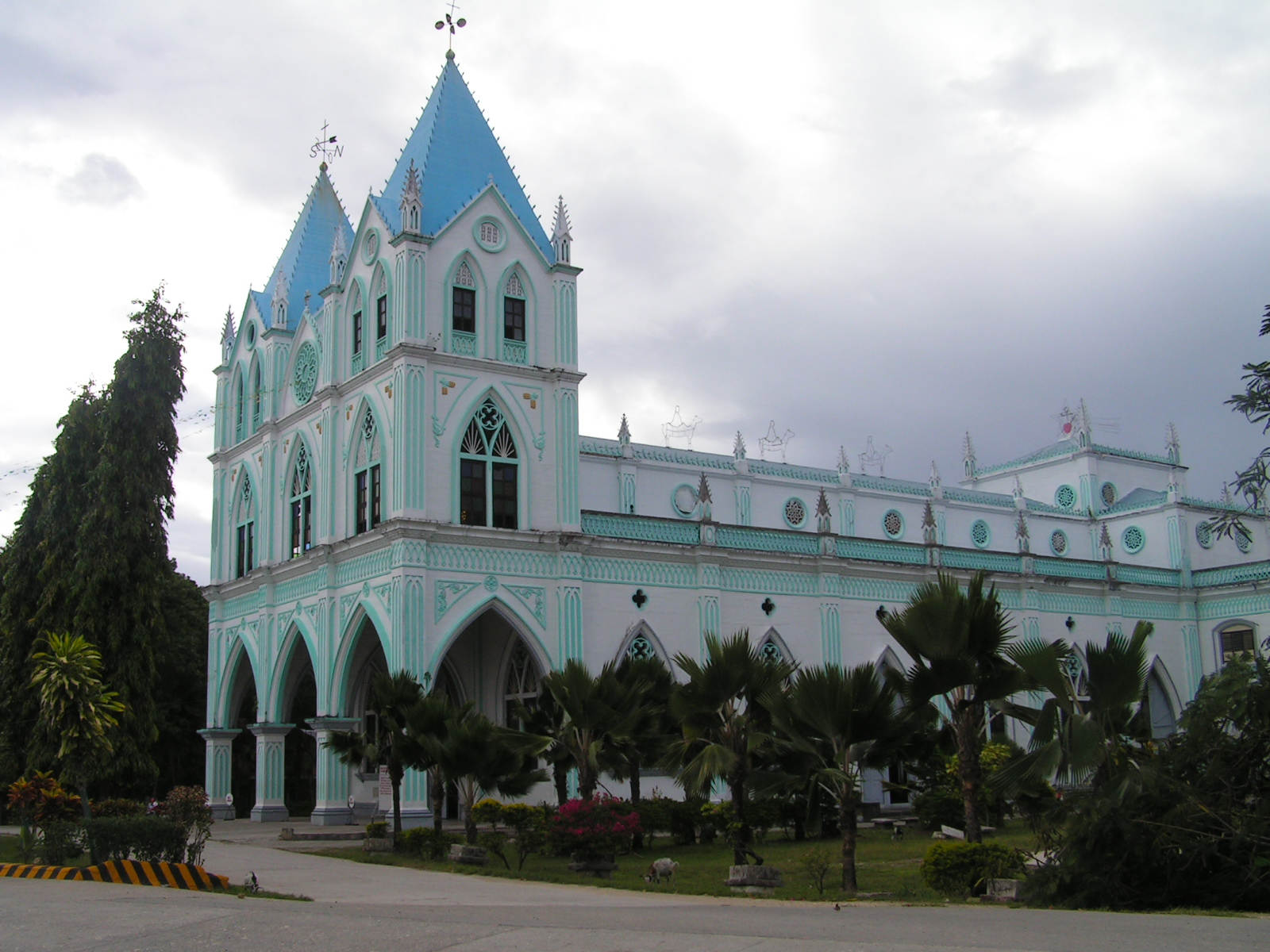
The church in November 2006

Calape Church originally had a stone foundation, with nipa palm roofing and walls made from tabique pampango, a thin partition wall made of interwoven pieces of bamboo or hardwood slats plastered over with a coating of lime mixed with sand.

From being a church made of light materials, the construction of the neo-Gothic style Calape Church started in 1933 and was completed in 1954. Eliseo Josol and Rosalio Real led the construction of the church based on the design of Santo Domingo Church in Intramuros. A bell cast in 1690 was also installed in the belfry.

== Architecture ==
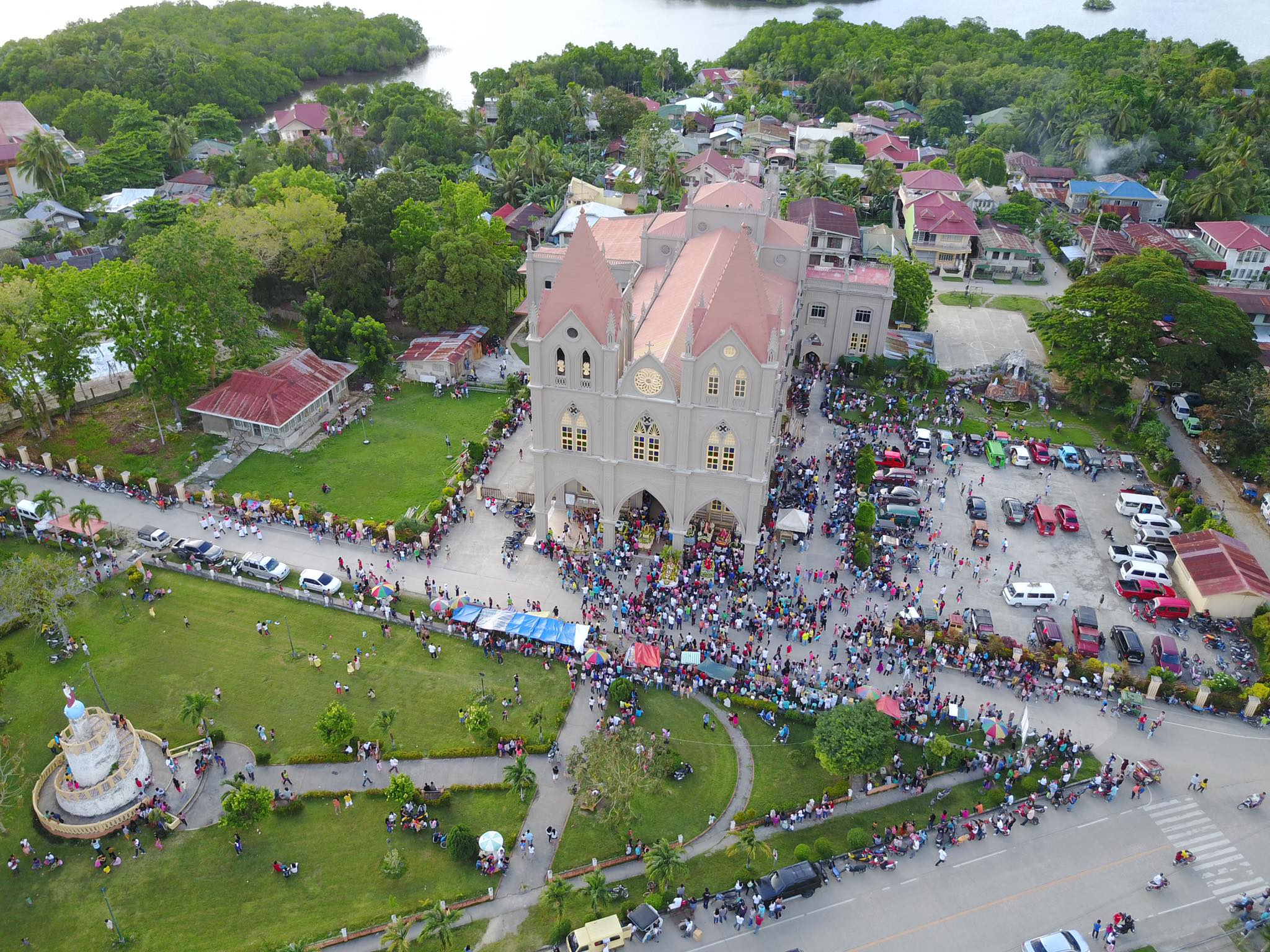
Aerial view of the church

Calape Church is adorned with Gothic pointed arches. Its portico is made of a colonnade with white reliefs of interlacing arches, a base, and a defined capital. The arcade is embellished from the architrave, cornice molding, scrollwork reliefs, four-lobed motif circumscribed by a circle at each apex, and contiguous horizontal ornamental relief. The piers are extended to the pediment through pilasters of similar decoration that divide the facade into three vertical panels. The upper register bears intricate adornments, three pointed arches enclosing two rectangular glass windows, lintels, two pointed arches and a circumscribed quatrefoil rotated by 45 degrees. Above the decor are relief decors.

The uppermost register contains a pointed arch pediment with crockets and a rose opening with ornate openwork. It is flanked by belfries bounded by pilasters culminating in crocketed pinnacles. Each belfry has a valley roof upon which contains a rose window and below are a pair of arch openings with balustrade, and it terminates in a pyramidal roof. At the ground level the entrance reflects the ornamentation of the front-facing portico through pilasters and three blind arches, the middle one containing the entrance doorway above which is the statue of the patron and the other two flanking it with windows similar to the one found in the upper register.

== Cultural declaration ==
On May 9, 2023, Calape Church was designated as a National Cultural Treasure by the National Museum of the Philippines.
