= Tubigon =

Municipality in Bohol, Philippines

- Municipality
- Municipality of Tubigon
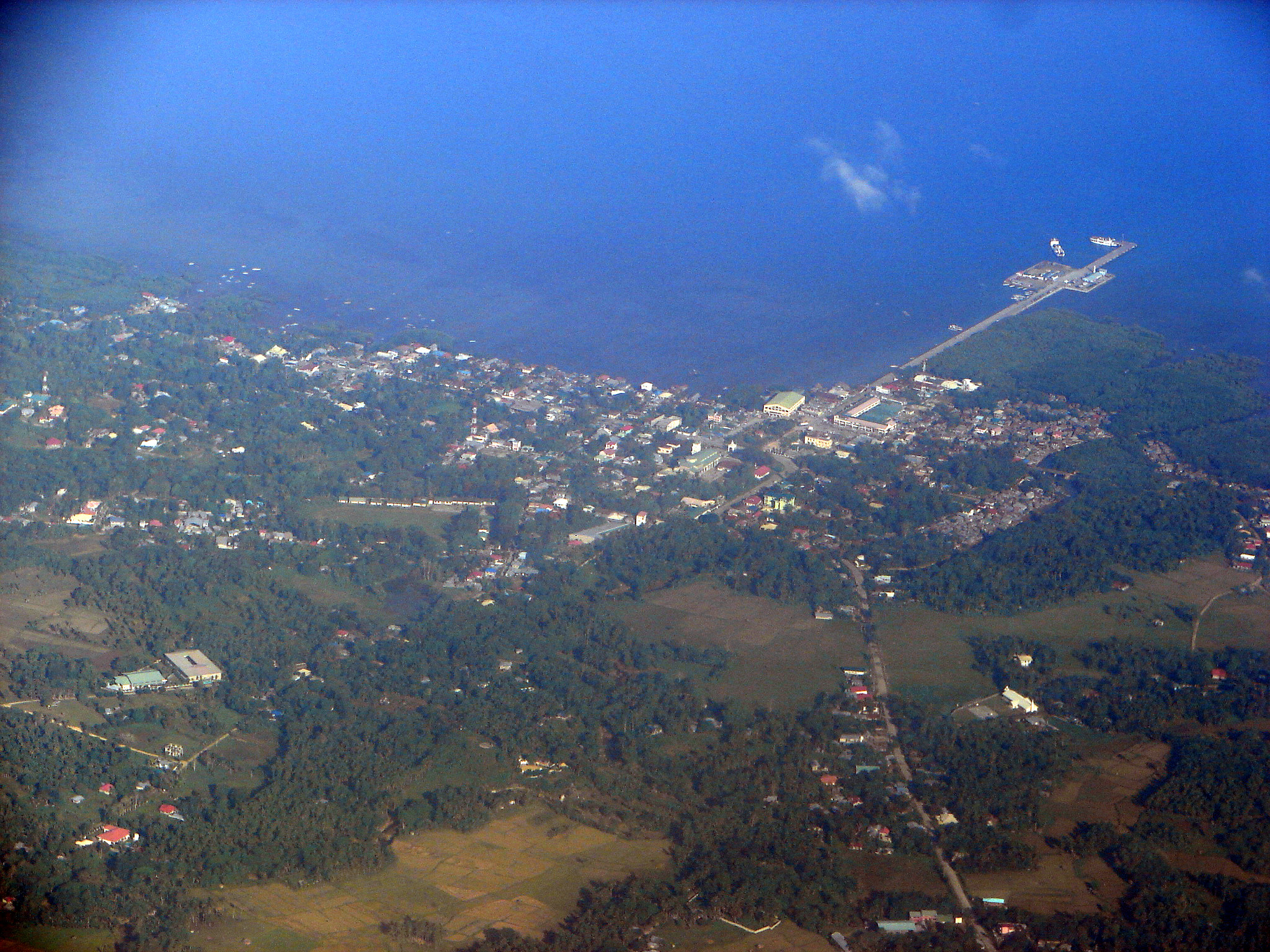
- Aerial view of Tubigon, Bohol

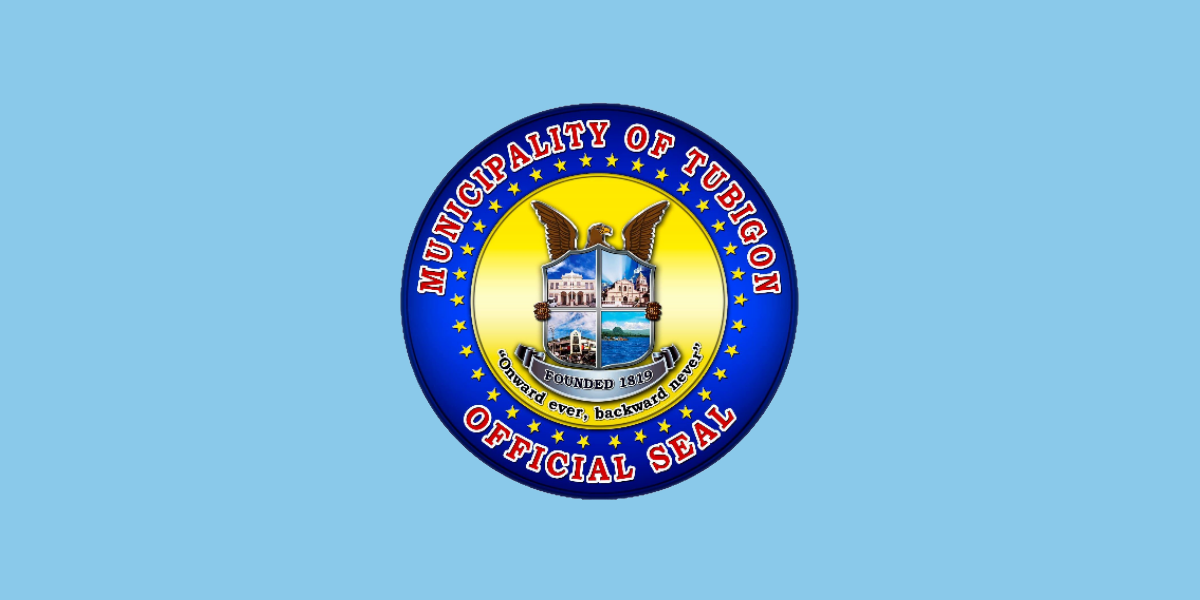
- Flag

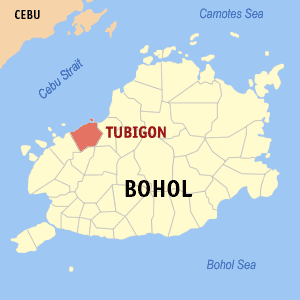
- Map of Bohol with Tubigon highlighted
- Interactive map of Tubigon
- Location within the Philippines
- Coordinates: 9°57′N 123°58′E
- Country: Philippines
- Region: Central Visayas
- Province: Bohol
- District: 1st district
- Founded: 1819
- Barangays: 34 (see Barangays)

Government
  - Type: Sangguniang Bayan
  - Mayor: Marlon R. Amila
  - Vice Mayor: Delia F. Lasco
  - Representative: John Geesnell Yap
  - Municipal Council: Members: Susan Espera C. Lopez; Gay M. Lopez; Virgelle Gail B. Jao; Aniceto U. Alipoyo; Danila A. Cañada; Flaviano R. Adtoon; Ernnest Paolo L. Mascariñas; Paciente D. Fuentes
  - Electorate: 33,429 voters (2025)

Area
  - Total: 81.87 km^{2} (31.61 sq mi)
- Elevation: 39 m (128 ft)
- Highest elevation: 360 m (1,180 ft)
- Lowest elevation: 0 m (0 ft)

Population (2024 census)
  - Total: 49,275
  - Density: 601.9/km^{2} (1,559/sq mi)
  - Households: 11,389

Economy
  - Income class: 1st municipal income class
  - Poverty incidence: 23.35% (2021)
  - Revenue: ₱ 397.5 million (2024)
  - Assets: ₱ 809.9 million (2024)
  - Expenditure: ₱ 391.1 million (2024)
  - Liabilities: ₱ 133.8 million (2024)

Service provider
  - Electricity: Bohol 1 Electric Cooperative (BOHECO 1)
- Time zone: UTC+8 (PST)
- ZIP code: 6329
- PSGC: 071245000
- IDD : area code: +63 (0)38
- Native languages: Boholano dialect Cebuano; Tagalog
- Website: www.tubigon.gov.ph

Tubigon, officially the Municipality of Tubigon (Cebuano: Lungsod sa Tubigon; Tagalog: Bayan ng Tubigon), is a municipality in the province of Bohol, Philippines. According to the 2024 census, it has a population of 49,275 people.

Tubigon is well known for its "lambay" crabs.

The municipality of Tubigon, Bohol celebrates its feast on May 15, to honor the town patron San Isidro Labrador.

== History ==
=== Origins and Early Settlement ===
The first settlers in Tubigon settled along the shores of the river that flows through the community. Their exact origins are unknown but they are thought to be early Malays from southeast Asian countries, migrating to the Philippines in small bangkas. Seasonal overflowing of the river flooded the community and led the place to be called "Tubigan" (meaning "place having water" or "watery"), which later morphed into "Tubigon" (meaning "place abounding in water"). The first record of the town of Tubigon dates from the early part of the 17th century.

=== Civil Organization as a Visita (1816-1819) ===
In 1816, the community organized itself under a recognized headman, Yguiz Hutora, who was succeeded by teniente Mijares and by teniente Matong in 1818. A chapel was built on an elevated site of the settlement but had no officiating priest. A coadjutor of the Spanish friars from the Calape parish would perform the religious ceremonies, as Tubigon operated as a visita—a dependent administrative and spiritual sub-territory—governed entirely by its older mother town (matriz) of Calape.

In 1819, by authority of the Spanish Governor of Cebu, Tubigon was formally organized into an independent town by separating from the town of Calape, with Capitan Teniente Matong becoming the first gobernadorcillo. .

=== Territorial Conception (1852) ===
On February 9, 1852, the Governor-General Juan Antonio de Uzbiztondo decreed the spiritual separation of Tubigon from its mother parish of Calape, forming the Parish of Tubigon under the patronage of San Isidro Labrador. This decision was built upon the petitions from the Principalia (local elite) of Tubigon, and backed by the Parish Priest of Calape, the Governor of Cebu, and the Bishop of Cebu. Tubigon was qualified because it had a sufficient number of tributos (taxpayers) for the proper sustenance of its Parish Priest and possessed the required public buildings mandated by the imperial law. To bolster the new parish, the visita (tributary village) of Canogon, which historically under the jurisdiction of Inabanga, was annexed to Tubigon due to geographical proximity

The Parish Priest of Calape named Fray Pedro Polo del Carmen, an Augustinian Recollect, requested the Governor-General that he wished to be transferred to the new Parish of Tubigon, and Manila approved, which makes him its first parish priest.

On March 1, 1852, the provincial authorities–as Manila ordered–had to define the physical boundaries between Tubigon and its neighboring towns of Calape and Inabanga. The border between Calape and Tubigon was proposedly established at the mouth of the Mandaug River, crossing its riverbed at the desembarcadero (landing site), and continuing in a straight line through the Magboc hillock until reaching the interior mountains. The boundary between Tubigon and Inabanga was also established from the seashore directly fronting the ravine (quebrada) on Mount Alimono, extending inland in a straight line through the ravine to the island's interior jurisdiction.

The Gobernadorcillos (town mayors) and the Principales (local elites) of both affected towns, as ordered by the Alcalde Mayor (Governor) of Cebu to ensure these borders are legally binding, they had to physically meet at the borders together to witness the placement of the stone markers. They were also required to draft three identical acts (agreements): one copy for the main provincial court, and one copy for each towns involved. The governor ends with an appeal for order and harmony and commanding them to return the signed order once the stones were firmly in place.

On 8 March 1852, sitio Bacane was made as the northern boundary between Tubigon and Inabanga.

=== Tubigon - Calape Border Dispute (1852) ===
==== The Grievance of Calape ====
The boundary line that was proposed by provincial government of Cebu immediately ignited a fierce diplomatic protest from the principales (local elite) of Calape. On March 15, 1852, the Común de principales (council of prominent citizens) of Calape submitted an emotional petition to the Alcalde Mayor. They argued that the Mandaug River mouth was an unfair midpoint. According to their measurements, the distance from Calape's church to the Mandaug mouth was only 2,500 brazas (approx.4.1 kilometers), while the distance from the church of Tubigon to the same point spanned around 4,500 brazas (approx. 7.1 kilometers). The leaders of Calape also expresses deep offense and heartbreak over losing land to a former visita (dependent village), finding it inherently unjust and painful that the "daughter" town is being granted a massive, sweeping territory while the "mother" town is being choked out.

Calape claimed that if this border stands, they will be reduced to nothing more than "a sad piece of land", that could force their local residents to beg Tubigon for farmable land just to feed their families or fully pay their tributes to the Spanish Crown. They also state they cannot stay silent while hearing the murmur of their starving citizens. They also boldly asserted that the Alcalde Mayor had been severely deceived and misinformed, and to settle this gridlock they asked for an official surveyor (agrimensores), arguing that a scientific survey can neutrally map the land and hit upon the true middle ground between the two municipalities.

==== The Counter-Argument of Tubigon ====
On March 22, 1852, Tubigon's Gobernadorcillo (Municipal Governor), Benedicto Huerbana, and his council countered Calape's allegations with a detailed defense of their territory. Tubigon admitted that the Mandaug River was technically closer to Calape's church (a 1.5-hour walk) than Tubigon's (a 2-hour walk), but they argued that Calape possessed significant geographical advantages.

Tubigon mentioned Panggangan Island as a highly fertile and productive island part of Calape. They claimed that the island is accessible by foot during low tide and was home to more than 100 tributos (taxpayers) families. Tubigon also insisted that its interior growth was strictly limited to a two-hour distance before running directly into the boundaries of Catigbian. Calape, conversely, faced no interior towns to its west and could freely expand to six to eight hours into the interior mountains.

Tubigon described their own territory as highly unyielding covered in thick forests and choked with rocks. Tubigon also states that Calape's claim of impending starvation are outright false, and accused the leaders of Calape acting out of pure malice, stating that their true agenda was to "destroy and annihilate" the newly independent town of Tubigon out of jealousy and spite.

They also argued that the lands of Mandaug were the only reason that 200 of their residents could survive, noting that Tubigon farmers had spent 20 years clearing, draining, and cultivating the area through "sweat and resources". They also claimed that Calape only started to encroaching on this territory for the past five years prior. In contrast, they claimed Calape possessed the finest, stone-free, easily irrigated agricultural plains, due to its abundant natural springs and estuaries, in all of Bohol.

===== The Controversial Mapmaker =====
The officials of Tubigon also exposed the mastermind behind Calape's protest map: Enrique de Piña, a Spanish schoolmaster residing in Calape. According to Huerbana, de Piña had drawn a highly distorted and ridiculous map out of personal interest. De Piña, as Tubigon claimed, had acquired a large tract of farmland in the disputed area of Mandaug while he was a registered resident of Tubigon. After four years, he relocated to Calape and engineered the boundary protest so that his private estate would be legally annexed into the jurisdiction of Calape instead of Tubigon.

==== Administrative Sabotage ====
The local clergy was also entangled in the feud. On March 22, 1852, that same day Tubigon countered the arguments of Calape, Fray Pedro Polo del Carmen, who previously served in Calape and was transferred to Tubigon as its first parish priest, formally sided with Tubigon. He informed the Alcalde Mayor of Cebu that Calape's leaders were acting deceptively, stating that Calape possessed enough land, larger than the town of Baclayon and Tagbilaran combined which sustains a massive population of approximately 4000 tributos (taxpayers), and he believed that Calape can comfortably support 6,000 tributes–though it only had about 800 tributes at the time. He asked the governor of Cebu to completely discard and ignore everything Calape has submitted, calling their argument "false". Instead, he urges to accept Tubigon's counter-petition as the absolute truth.

On March 26, 1852, the Governor of Cebu received both the town councils and the parish priest petition. He accepts the physical reality presented by Tubigon and Fray Pedro Polo del Carmen. The Governor notes that even with the new borders enforced, Calape will still walk away with a massive amount of land, and reiterates that Calape's land is undeniably "of the best quality on the entire island". In grounding his decision, the Governor cites Ley 7, Titulo 12, Libro 4 of the Leyes de Indias, he stated that Calape already possesses far more land than the absolute maximum required by the Spanish Crown. Therefore, they have no legal leg to stand on regarding "land deprivation".The Governor explain as well that the map drawn by Enrique de Piña, which Calape used, was legally worthless, stating that the schoolteacher lacks any professional training or knowledge as a surveyor.

The Alcalde Mayor clarified that a fundamental rule of colonial administration that boundary lines delineate civil and spiritual jurisdictions; they do not alter private land ownership. Even if a citizen's land fell into Tubigon's territory, they remained the rightful owner of their property and would suffer no financial loss. He also gave both towns 15-day deadline to establish the boundary markers at the mouth of Mandaug River under a threat of a 10-peso fine for the leaders and they will also be forced to pay all the court costs, travel expenses, and daily wages of a government-appointed Commissioner, who will be sent from Cebu to physically force the placement of the boundary markers. The Governor also warned them sternly to maintain good harmony and act as honorable neighbors, hinting that the state will criminally prosecute them if they will stir riots, moving boundary stones, or harassing Tubigon's farmer as a serious crime against the Spanish Crown.

Calape attempted to raise an appeal on April 8, 1852, stating that losing the river can be burdensome and harmful to their side, both in civil as well as in the spiritual, and in the well-being of their residents. They beg the Governor to grant a formal suspension of the boundary-marking order until a deep review can be made, but it was dismissed by the Governor of Cebu. While the Governor closes the door on Calape at his court in Cebu, he leaves them one final legal avenue for their appeal, which is the Governor-General and the Royal Audiencia (Supreme Court) in Manila

Determined to enforce the law, Gobernadorcillo Benedicto Huerbana of Tubigon sent four consecutive letters to the government of Calape, politely asking for specific time and date for the Principales to meet him at the river landing to plane the stones together. Calape effectively stalled the process through administrative delays, ignoring the first three letters, returning only delivery receipts but no actual reply. On April 10, 1852, when pressed on the fourth attempt, the Town Mayor of Calape finally replied with a convenient excuse that the Principales had not yet gathered together, and to compound the delay, they offered an additional excuse that a prominent resident had just died that very day, throwing the town leadership into mourning, and there is nothing they can do to meet them at the river. Huerbana, realizing that Tubigon might get swept up in the Governor's anger, he sent a letter to completely absolve his town of guilt, and to prove his case, he packaged up Calape's empty receipts and the final excuse-filled letter and ships them to Cebu as physical evidence of Calape's non-compliance.The 15-day window expired with no boundary marker built, throwing the region into four year territorial stalemate.

==== The Final Petition (1855) ====
On September 1, 1855, Calape launched another petition to the new Provincial Governor of Cebu, after realizing that the previous governor had left the office, stating that the former governor was biased and incompetent, accusing him of treating Calape with "the utmost indifference" when he should have acted as their "political father" who looked equally upon his subject.

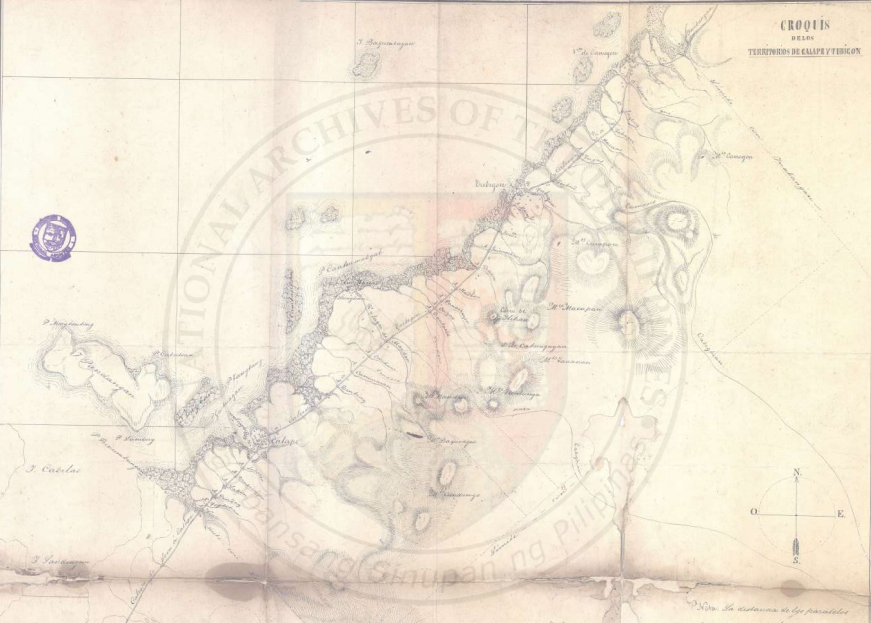
A Spanish colonial-era map (croquis) of the territories of Calape and Tubigon in Bohol, Philippines. Sourced from the National Archives of the Philippines.

They also used the former governor's legal weapon against him by appealing to the Leyes de Indias (Laws of the Indies), which dictates that every towns are entitled to a minimum of one league of communal land (equivalent to 5,000 brazas). They points out in their appeal that if the border is set at the Mandaug River then it is only 2,500 brazas from the Church of Calape, thus the former governor violated the imperial law by having Calape with only half of the legal league that was guaranteed by the Spanish Crown. They also points out that the former governor based his entire ruling on the testimonies of the town of Tubigon and its first parish priest who destroyed their case in 1852. Calape officially drops its demand for independent surveyor and instead proposes a concrete, historical alternative which is to place the boundary stones at the Cogao River, which they claimed was the ancient historical boundary between the towns.

=== The Final Resolution (1856) ===
By 1856, the boundary dispute had caused severe economic damage to the region. Because neither town could agree on the border, a massive, fertile buffer zone between Tubigon and Calape was left entirely uncultivated for four-straight years, as residents from both sides feared planting crops on a contested soil. Furthermore, Bohol's administrative structure had shifted, placing the towns under the jurisdiction of a new Politico-Military Governor, Guillermo Kirkpatrick. He commissioned an independent imperial surveyor, Domingo de Escondrillas, the District Inspector of Public and Private Works, to conduct a scientific survey and map out the entire contested zone, including the surrounding boundaries of Loon, Catigbian, and Inabanga.

On July 10, 1856, Domingo de Escondrillas submitted his official report and terrain sketch. Based on this survery, Governor Kirkpatrick designed a compromise boundary line (Line A-B on the historical map.) The line began at the mouth of the Mandaug River, cut through the ravine formed by Mount Mandaug and Mount Tuntunga, and terminated where it met the borders of Catigbian. This line divided the disputed agricultural land into equal portions, ensuring neither town was unfairly disadvantaged. Kirkpatrick forwarded the proposal to the central government in Manila for definitive approval.

On September 18, 1856, the Governor and Captain-General of the Philippines officially ratified Kirkpatrick's compromise line. To prevent future conflicts, Manila mandated that the boundaries be marked with permanent, uniform stone monuments built to specific architectural standards. It was constructed out of solid-stone over a foundation that is one vara (approx. 2.8 feet) deep. It features a two-foot-tall pedestal base complete with a die and cornices, which supports a six-foot-tall, square column shaft that tapers to a pointed top. Carved labels detailing the exact distance to adjacent towns and the monument's official purpose will serve as inscriptions, and, if technically feasible, the entire structure will be topped with a functional sundial. This effectively ended the bitter four-year rivalry and permanently secured Tubigon's southern agricultural frontier.

On 19 June 1865, the boundary between Tubigon and Catigbian was set at the Sampilangon River and on 14 September 1913, the boundary with Antequera (currently San Isidro) was fixed at sitio Tubod.

On 31 January 1919, Tubigon lost five barrios when Clarin was formed by virtue of proclamation by Governor Yeater.

Tubigon was badly affected by the 2013 Bohol earthquake, suffering 11 fatalities and damage to some 7,300 homes, as well as total destruction of its town hall and church.

== Geography ==
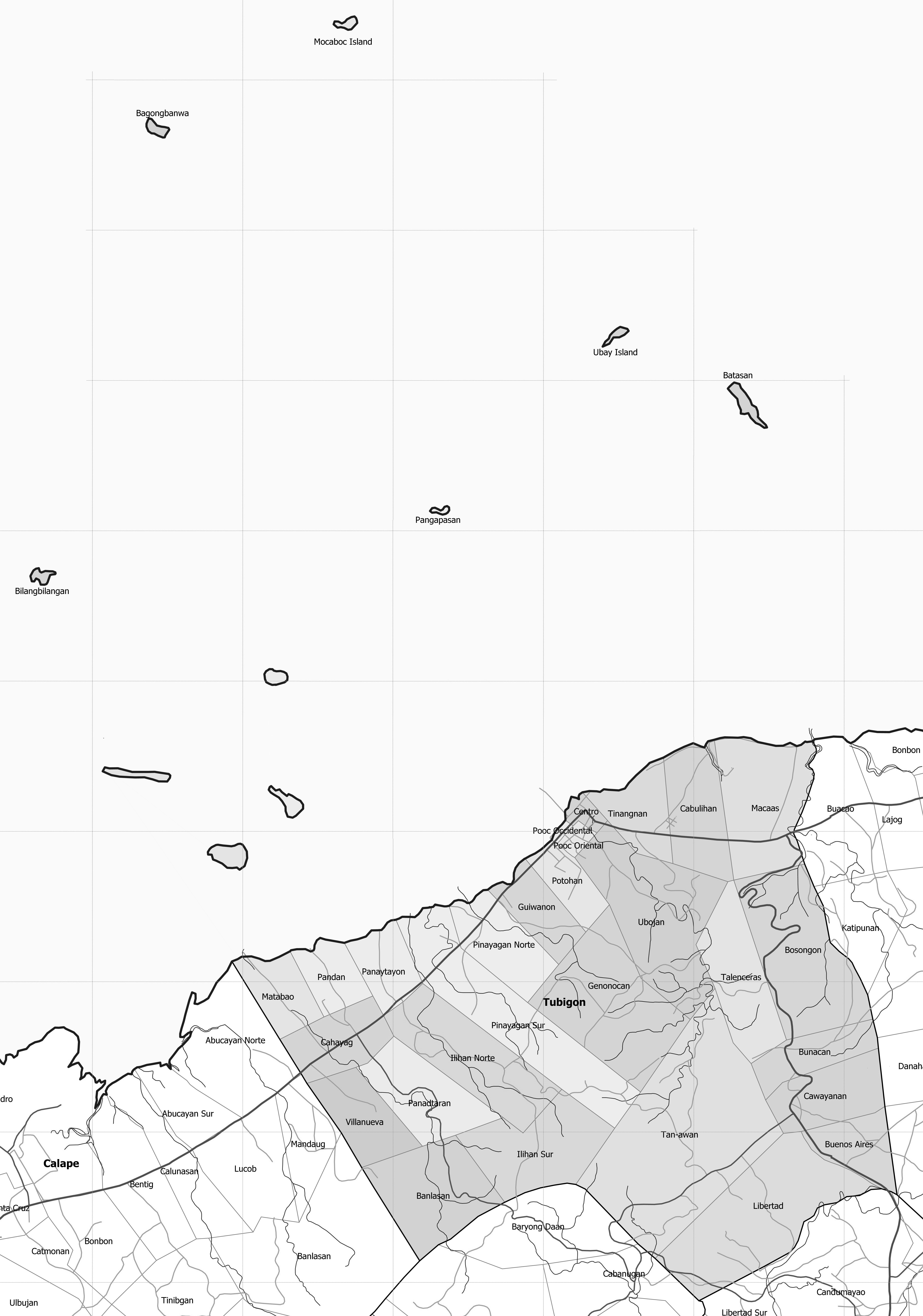
Map of Tubigon showing barangays and islands

Tubigon is bounded by Calape in the west, Clarin in the east, by the Cebu Strait in the north, and San Isidro in the south. Located 54 kilometres (34 mi) from Tagbilaran, it is the nearest seaport in Bohol to Cebu City, providing many daily ferry round-trips to Cebu City. It has recently expanded its seaport to accommodate additional sea traffic.

=== Barangays ===
Tubigon is politically subdivided into 34 barangays. Each barangay consists of puroks and some have sitios.

PSGC	Barangay	Population			±% p.a.	
		2024		2010		
071245001	Bagongbanwa	2.1%	1,043	876	▴	1.23%
071245003	Banlasan	1.8%	891	893	▾	−0.02%
071245004	Batasan (Batasan Island)	1.7%	852	1,107	▾	−1.82%
071245005	Bilangbilangan	0.9%	444	567	▾	−1.70%
071245006	Bosongon	2.6%	1,295	1,070	▴	1.35%
071245007	Buenos Aires	2.2%	1,101	945	▴	1.08%
071245002	Bunacan	1.9%	959	980	▾	−0.15%
071245008	Cabulihan	5.0%	2,477	2,327	▴	0.44%
071245009	Cahayag	2.5%	1,243	1,213	▴	0.17%
071245010	Cawayanan	3.1%	1,507	1,455	▴	0.25%
071245011	Centro (Poblacion)	5.0%	2,471	2,821	▾	−0.92%
071245012	Genonocan	1.4%	688	506	▴	2.18%
071245013	Guiwanon	2.6%	1,261	1,210	▴	0.29%
071245014	Ilihan Norte	2.8%	1,384	1,498	▾	−0.55%
071245015	Ilihan Sur	1.3%	657	634	▴	0.25%
071245016	Libertad	2.4%	1,178	1,095	▴	0.51%
071245017	Macaas	4.9%	2,391	2,266	▴	0.38%
071245019	Matabao	2.2%	1,090	1,245	▾	−0.93%
071245018	Mocaboc Island	1.3%	624	606	▴	0.21%
071245020	Panadtaran	1.8%	864	927	▾	−0.49%
071245021	Panaytayon	4.5%	2,230	2,069	▴	0.53%
071245022	Pandan	2.5%	1,214	1,324	▾	−0.61%
071245023	Pangapasan (Pangapasan Island)	1.0%	514	596	▾	−1.03%
071245024	Pinayagan Norte	4.5%	2,212	2,082	▴	0.43%
071245025	Pinayagan Sur	4.4%	2,180	1,956	▴	0.76%
071245026	Pooc Occidental (Poblacion)	1.7%	851	1,131	▾	−1.97%
071245027	Pooc Oriental (Poblacion)	5.1%	2,533	2,644	▾	−0.30%
071245028	Potohan	4.3%	2,137	1,868	▴	0.95%
071245029	Talenceras	1.7%	821	798	▴	0.20%
071245030	Tan‑awan	1.3%	655	883	▾	−2.07%
071245031	Tinangnan	5.9%	2,909	2,714	▴	0.49%
071245032	Ubay Island	0.4%	196	241	▾	−1.44%
071245033	Ubojan	5.0%	2,441	1,869	▴	1.89%
071245034	Villanueva	1.2%	580	486	▴	1.25%
	Total		49,275	44,902	▴	0.65%

=== Islands ===
There about 17 minor islands in the municipal, some of whom are inhabited:

- Bagongbanwa
- Batasan
- Bilangbilangan
- Budlaan
- Cabgan
- Cancostino
- Danajon Reef (part)
- Hayaan
- Inanuran
- Maagpit
- Mocaboc
- Pangapasan
- Sib
- Silo
- Taboan Islet
- Tanga‑on
- Ubay Island and Reef

=== Climate ===
Climate data for Tubigon, Bohol
Month	Jan	Feb	Mar	Apr	May	Jun	Jul	Aug	Sep	Oct	Nov	Dec	Year
Mean daily maximum °C (°F)	28 (82)	28 (82)	29 (84)	31 (88)	31 (88)	30 (86)	30 (86)	30 (86)	30 (86)	29 (84)	29 (84)	28 (82)	29 (85)
Mean daily minimum °C (°F)	23 (73)	23 (73)	23 (73)	23 (73)	24 (75)	24 (75)	24 (75)	24 (75)	24 (75)	24 (75)	24 (75)	23 (73)	24 (74)
Average precipitation mm (inches)	98 (3.9)	82 (3.2)	96 (3.8)	71 (2.8)	104 (4.1)	129 (5.1)	101 (4.0)	94 (3.7)	99 (3.9)	135 (5.3)	174 (6.9)	143 (5.6)	1,326 (52.3)
Average rainy days	18.0	14.1	17.1	16.8	23.7	25.7	25.8	23.3	24.2	25.9	24.0	20.6	259.2
Source: Meteoblue (Use with caution: this is modeled/calculated data, not measured locally.)

== Demographics ==
Population census of Tubigon
Year	Pop.	±% p.a.
1903	15,168	—
1918	21,261	+2.28%
1939	21,766	+0.11%
1948	23,344	+0.78%
1960	24,040	+0.25%
1970	25,768	+0.70%
1975	28,275	+1.88%
1980	29,993	+1.19%
1990	34,302	+1.35%
1995	34,578	+0.15%
2000	40,385	+3.38%
2007	44,434	+1.33%
2010	44,902	+0.38%
2015	45,893	+0.42%
2020	47,886	+0.90%
2024	49,275	+0.69%
Source: Philippine Statistics Authority

== Economy ==
Poverty incidence of Tubigon

Source: Philippine Statistics Authority

Agriculture and fishing are the primary industries. 60% of the total land area of the municipality is used by agriculture and other related industries. The main agricultural produce includes rice, corn, coconut, bananas and different variety of vegetables.

Electric power is supplied by the Bohol Electric Cooperative I (BOHECO I). Its new administrative building is located in Tubigon along the National Road.

== Tourism ==
=== Enchanted Ilijan Hill Volcanic Nature Park ===
On April 15, 2024, first placer, Tubigon was awarded P25 million by the Department of Tourism's Tourism Champions Challenge, for the five-year development of Poblacion's Enchanted Ilijan Hill Volcanic Nature Park. Ilijan Hill was certified by PHIVOLCS as a volcanic plug, the Philippines’ first. As a prime tourist attraction with biodiversity and nature conservation, it showcases along the Plug Heritage Zone, a visitor center, a view deck, the Ilijan Heritage Center, Tubigon Arts and Culture Village and garden trail.

== Government ==
Since the year 1818, Tubigon was governed by a municipal mayor acting as its chief executive of the town.

LIST OF LOCAL EXECUTIVE OF TUBIGON
Name	Year
GOBERNADORCILLO
Mejares	1818
Matong	1819
Jabillo Baura	1820
Dayong	1821
Cosep	1822
Dohenio	1823
Lalong Hutora	1824
Jabillo Baura	1825
Titoy	1826
Tokoy	1827
Jabillo Baura	1828
Dayong	1829
Abing	1830
Bagis	1831
Matong	1832
Jabillo Baura	1833-1834
Franscisco (kokoy)	1835
Titoy Batausa	1836
Franscisco Hutora	1837
Jabillo Baura	1838
Francisco Bautista	1839
Abing	1840
Lalong	1841
Benedicto Huerbana	1842
Francisco (Kokoy)	1843
Benedicto Huerbana	1844
Faustino Bagolor	1845
Pedro Reserva	1846
Miguel Bolonos	1847
Benedicto Huerbana	1848
Lucas Corbatin	1849
Ignacio Cruz	1850
Benedicto Huerbana	1851-1852
Ignacio Cruz	1853
Hilario Reserva	1854
Isidro Biol	1855
Ignacio Cruz	1856
Juan Aplacador	1857
Amadio Salutan	1858
Santiago Somosot	1859
Victorio Salutan	1860-1861
Amadio Salutan	1862-1865
Juan Aplacador	1866
Domingo Cosare	1867-1868
Pedro Mascariñas	1869-1870
Amadio Salutan	1871-1872
Julian Aboloc	1873
Domingo Cosare	1874
Antonio Falcon	1875-1876
Tranquilino Dongdong	1877
Esteban Rosco	1878-1880
Domingo Cosare	1881-1883
Antonio Falcon	1884
Crisanto Lofranco	1885-1886
Esteban Rosco	1887-1888
Mateo Ayta	1889-1890
Custodio Rosave	1891-1892
Crisanto Lofranco	1893-1894
Antonio Falcon	1895
Ciriaco Paraguya	1896
Juan Mascarinas	1897
FIRST PHILIPPINE REPUBLIC (JEFE LOCAL)
Esteban Rosco	1898
Roman Lumain	1899
Macario Lumain	1900
AMERICAN COMMONWEALTH PERIOD (MUNICIPAL PRESIDENT)
Macario Lumain	1901
Ciriaco Paraguya	1902-1903
Hermogenes Lumain	1904-1906
Santos Baura	1907-1908
Jesus Vano	1908-1912
Macario Lumain	1912-1916
Ciriaco Lumen	1916-1919
Sulpicio Falcon	1919-1925
Timoteo Vedra	1925-1931
Avelino Chagas	1931-1940
JAPANESE OCCUPATION PERIOD
Jose Dual	1940-1943
Felix Muga	1943-1946
POST-INDEPENDENCE (MUNICIPAL MAYOR)
Lucrecio Paraguya	1946-1951
Salustiano Baura	1951-1959
Maximo Lasco	1959-1967
Salustiano Baura	1967-1971
Maximo Lasco	1971-1978
Eufrasio Mascarinas	1978-1998
Paulo Lasco	1998-2007
Luna Piezas	2007-2010
William Jao	2010-2013
Marlon Amila	2013-2016
William Jao	2016-2025
Marlon Amila	2025–present

== Transportation ==
Road

The main National Road is paved and provides easy access to neighboring coastal communities, with travel time to Tagbilaran about one hour. There are inland roads to Catigbian and San Isidro.

Public utility buses are available daily on routes to any point within the province of Bohol. Trips to Tagbilaran are on a 30-minute interval. Cars and vans are available for rent or charter any time.

Boat and ferry

Tubigon's municipal port is the second largest and busiest port in the province of Bohol. It is served by 6 conventional vessels and 2 modern fastcraft with a total of 20 trips daily to Cebu City. A roll-on/roll-off ferry operated by Lite Shipping Corporation is also operational making two trips daily.

There is no scheduled ferry service to smaller outlying islands, but outrigger canoes may be chartered any time.

== Gallery ==
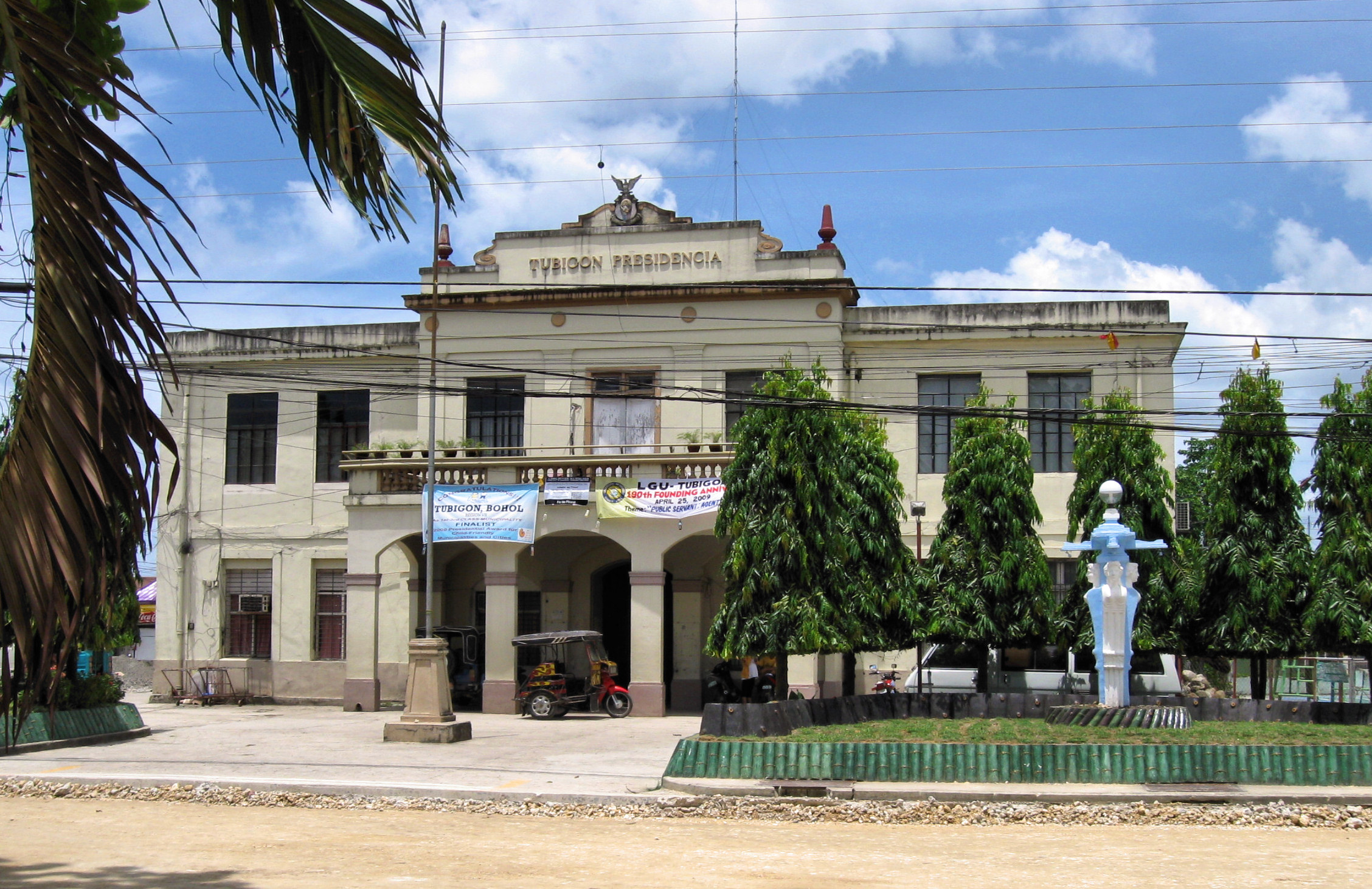
Municipal hall (pre-earthquake)...

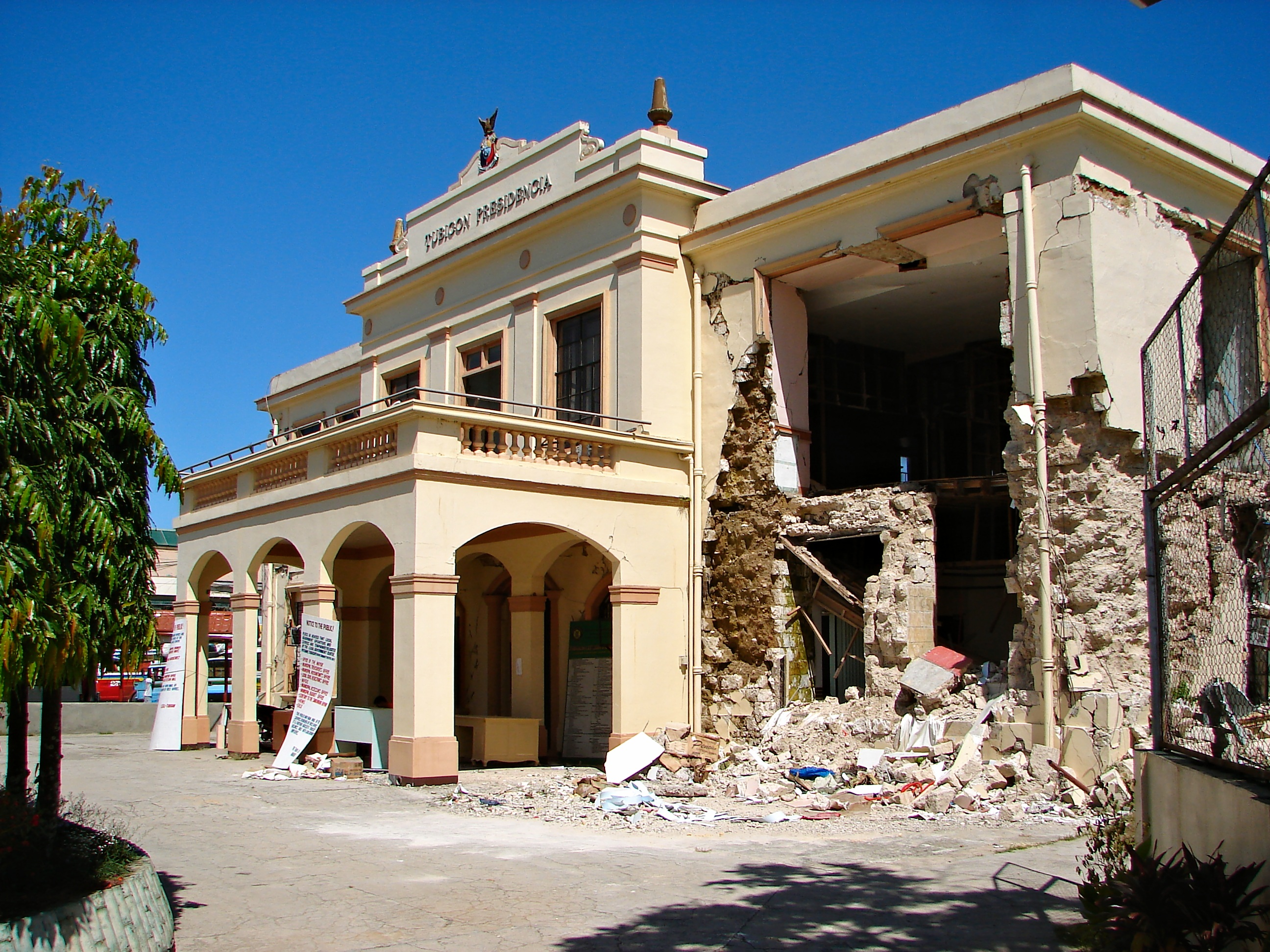
...and after

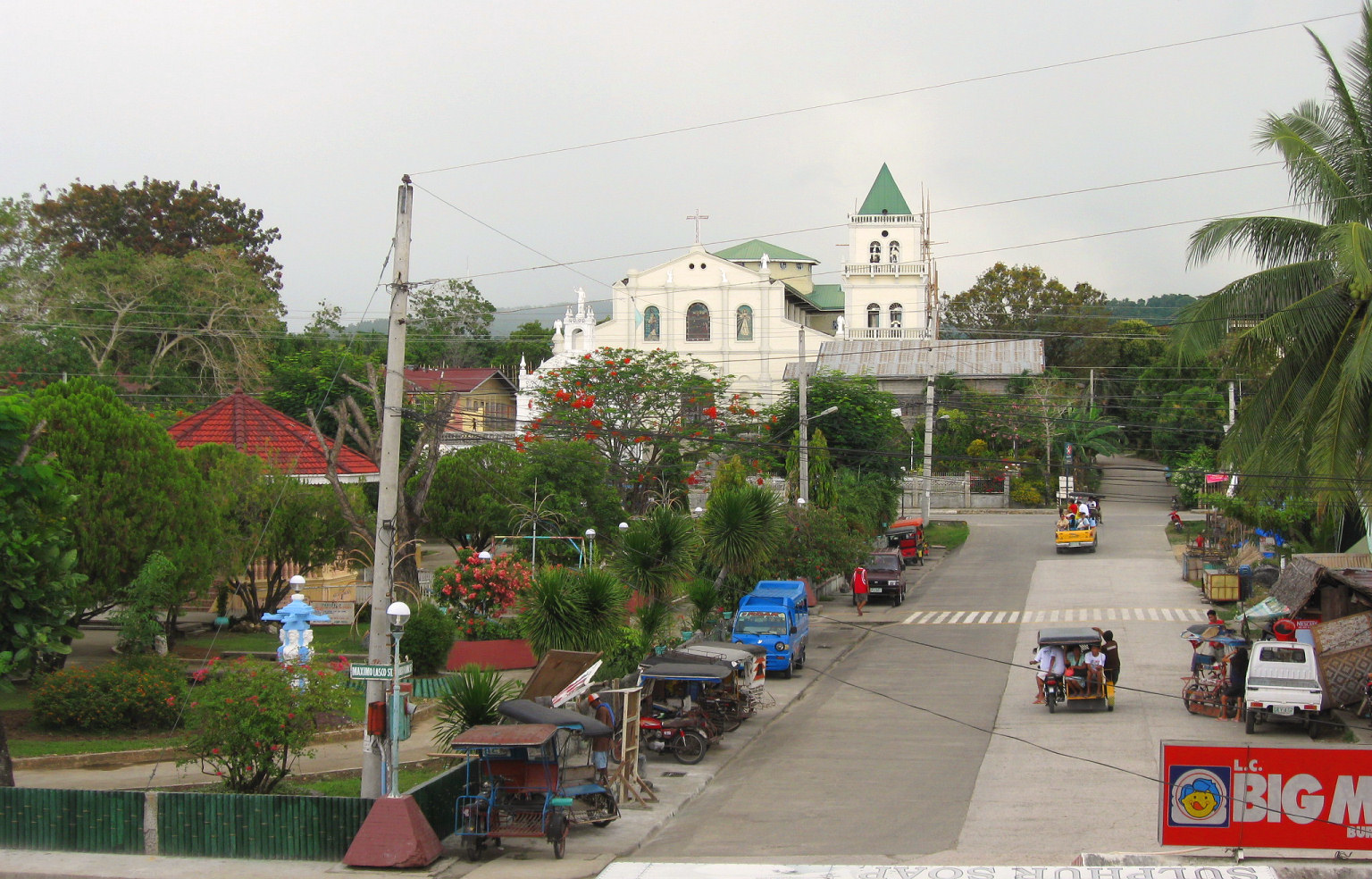
Poblacion

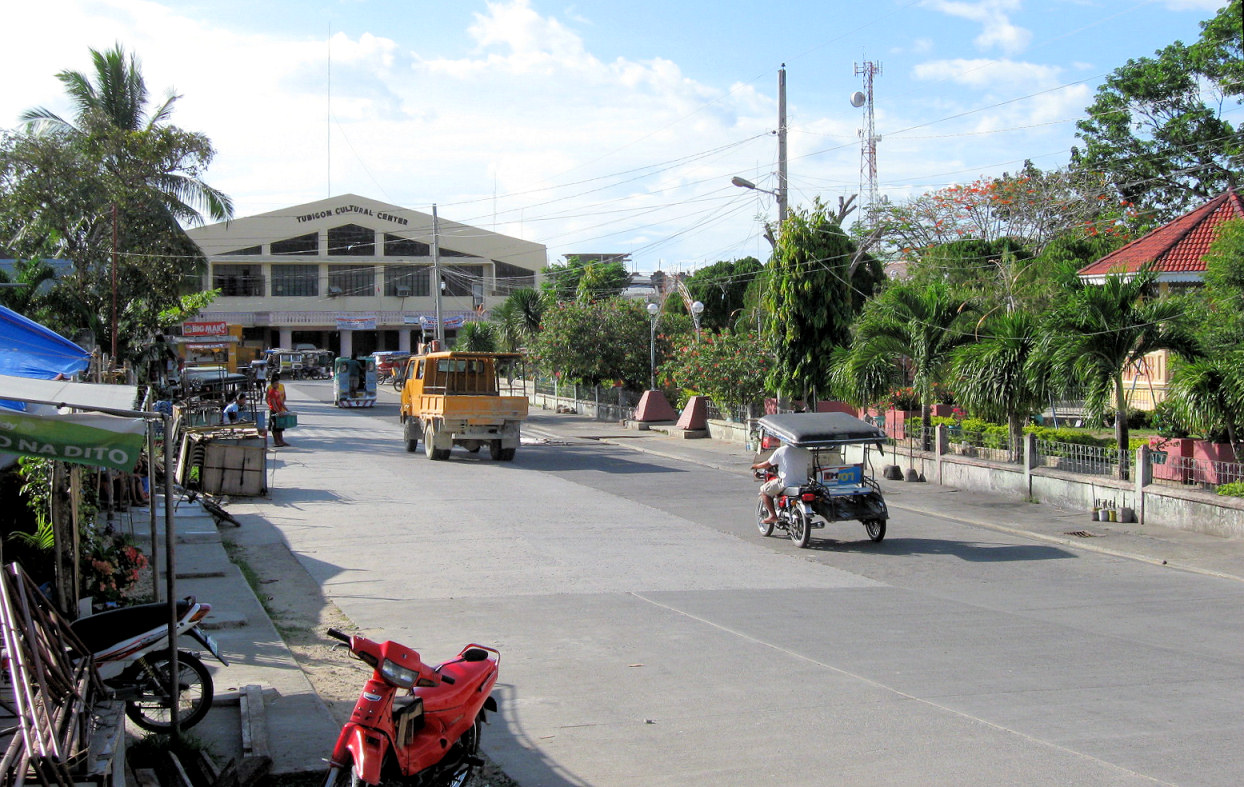
Cultural Center

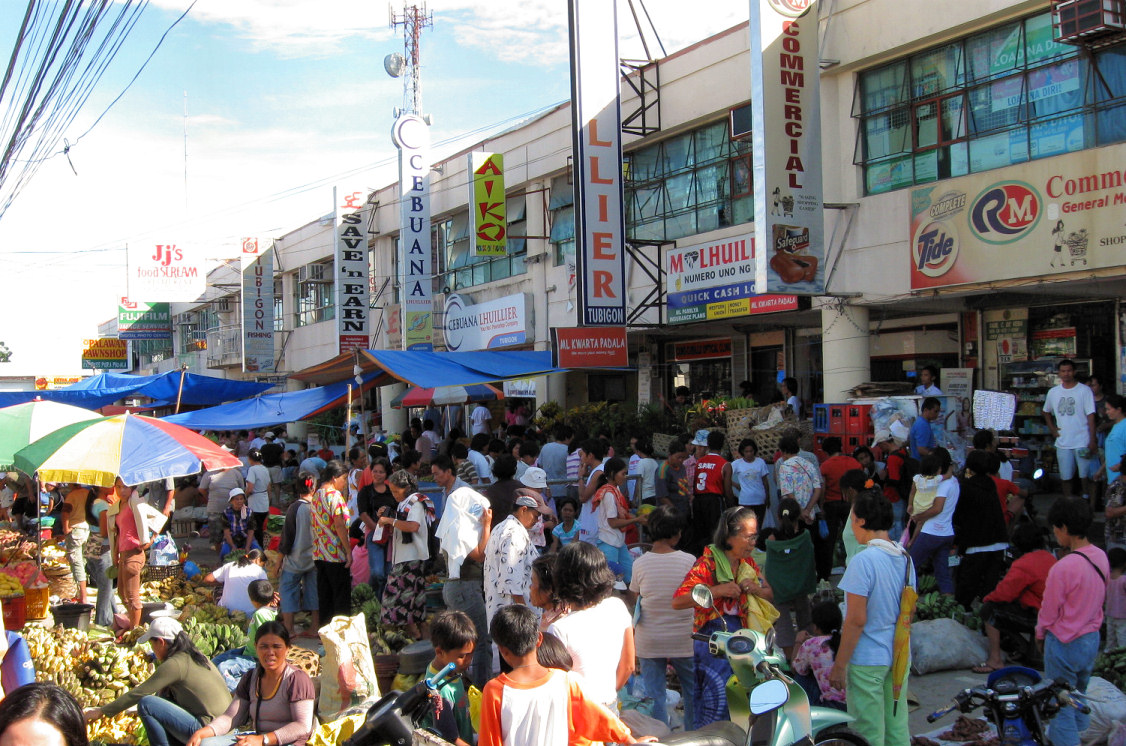
Market and Commercial Center

== Notable personalities ==
- Amay Bisaya, actor and comedian
- Pauline Amelinckx, Miss Supranational 2023 first runner-up
