= Calape =

Municipality in Bohol, Philippines

- Municipality
- Municipality of Calape
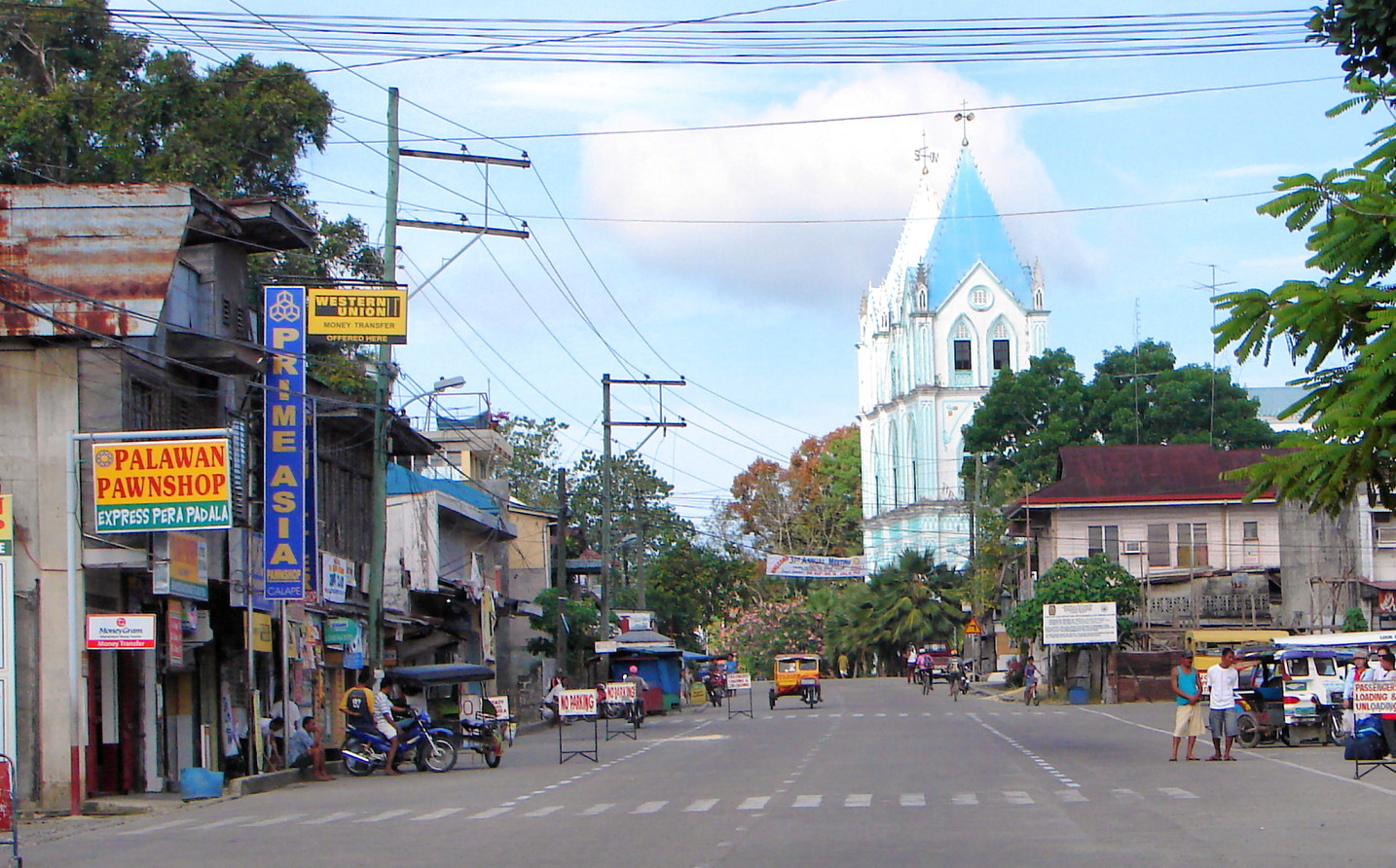
- From the top: Calape Municipal Hall in 2022, center of Calape in 2009

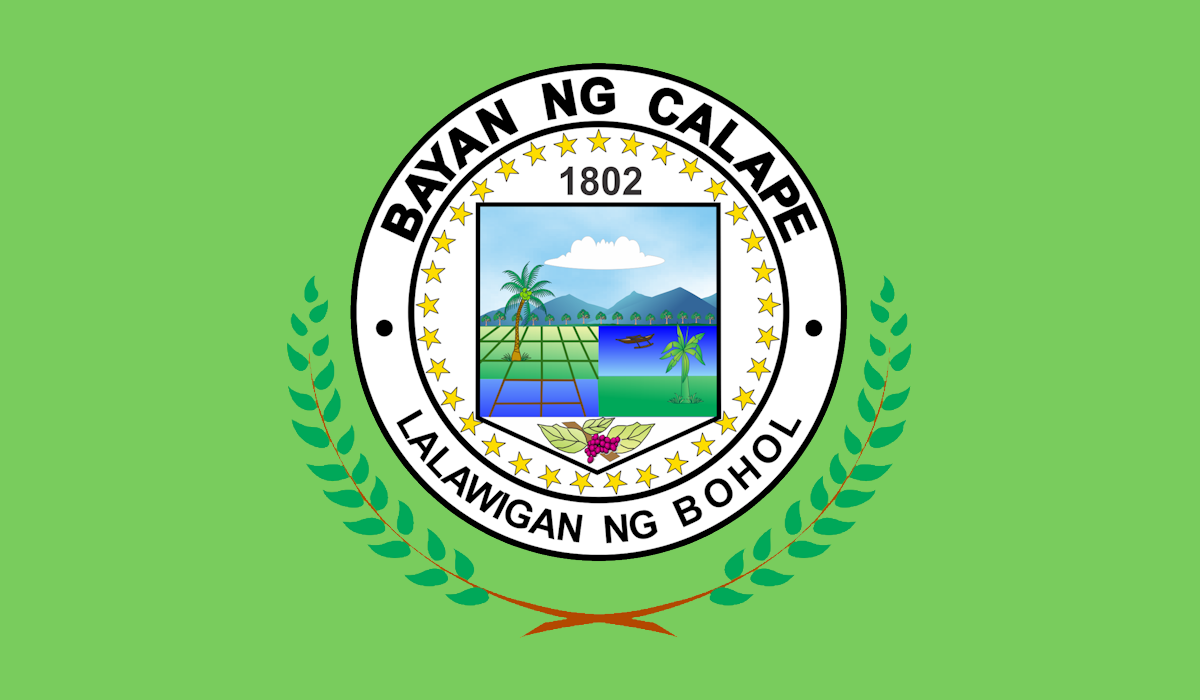
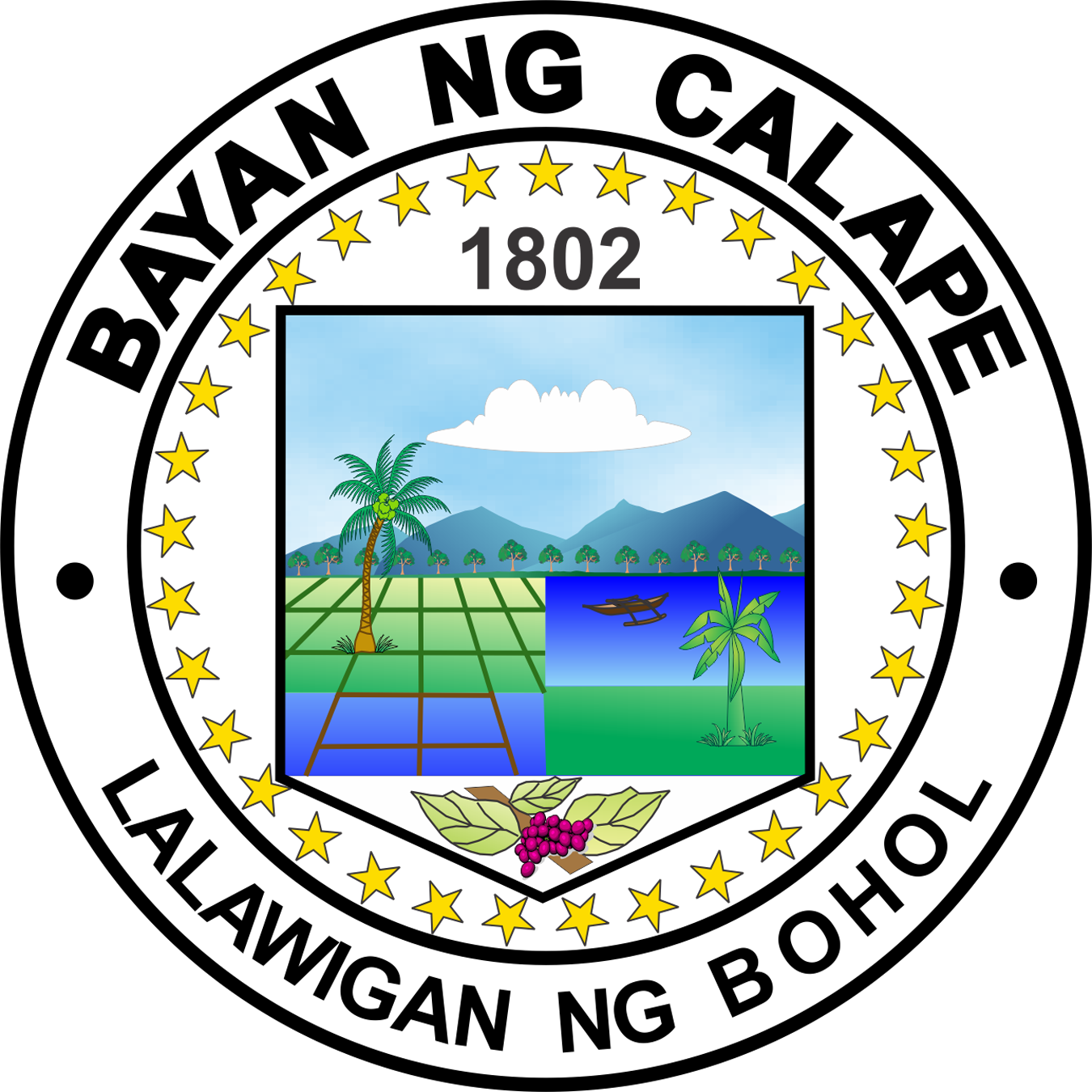
- Flag Seal
- Anthem: Calape Hymn
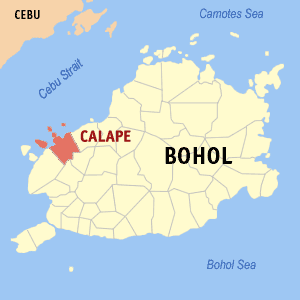
- Map of Bohol with Calape highlighted
- Interactive map of Calape
- Location within the Philippines
- Coordinates: 9°53′N 123°53′E
- Country: Philippines
- Region: Central Visayas
- Province: Bohol
- District: 1st district
- Founded: 1802
- Barangays: 33 (see Barangays)

Government
  - Type: Sangguniang Bayan
  - Mayor: Sulpicio N. Yu Jr
  - Vice Mayor: Roldan Origenes Damalerio
  - Representative: John Geesnell "Baba" Yap
  - Municipal Council: Members: Bill Mark Rances Yu; Jeanie Lato Veraño; Maria Aileen Dumadag Veloso; Ma. Leonora Gujil Rulona; Gerardo Forones Regalado; Marcus Julius Leyson Herrera; Jose Abarquez Jumangit Jr.; Kevin Reys Mag-uyon Damalerio
  - Electorate: 23,428 voters

Area
  - Total: 75.36 km^{2} (29.10 sq mi)
- Elevation: 59 m (194 ft)
- Highest elevation: 439 m (1,440 ft)
- Lowest elevation: −1 m (−3.3 ft)

Population (2024 census)
  - Total: 33,022
  - Density: 438.2/km^{2} (1,135/sq mi)
  - Households: 7,938

Economy
  - Income class: 2nd municipal income class
  - Poverty incidence: 17.97% (2023)
  - Revenue: ₱ 240.6 million (2024)
  - Assets: ₱ 577.5 million (2024)
  - Expenditure: ₱ 201.5 million (2024)
  - Liabilities: ₱ 89.02 million (2024)

Service provider
  - Electricity: Bohol 1 Electric Cooperative (BOHECO 1)
- Time zone: UTC+8 (PST)
- ZIP code: 6328
- PSGC: 071210000
- IDD : area code: +63 (0)38
- Native languages: Boholano dialect Cebuano; Tagalog
- Patron saint: Saint Vincent Ferrer
- Website: calapebohol.gov.ph

Calape, officially the Municipality of Calape (Cebuano: Lungsod sa Calape; Tagalog: Bayan ng Calape), is a municipality in the province of Bohol, Philippines. According to the 2024 census, it has a population of 33,022 people.

== Etymology ==
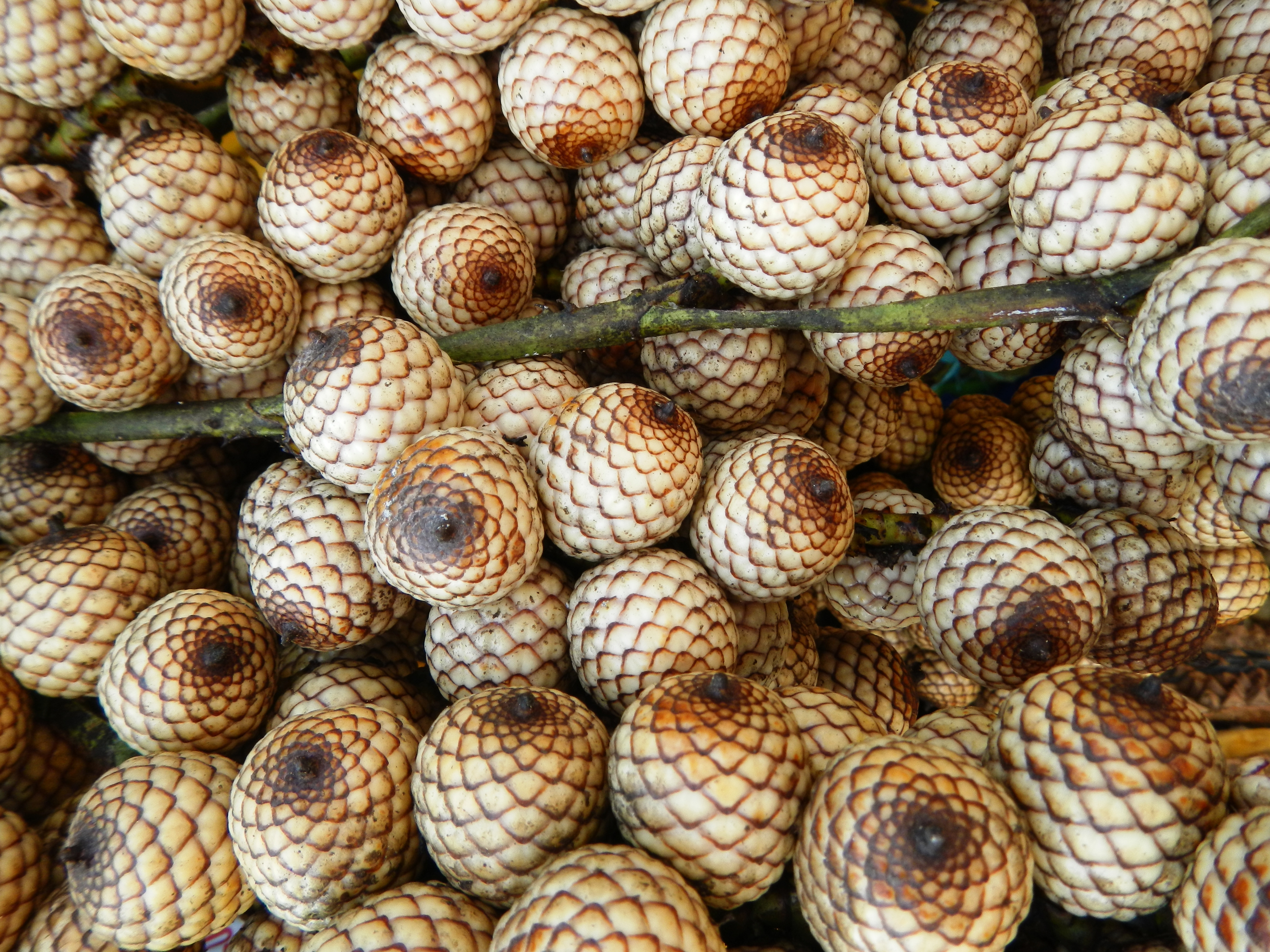
Rattan fruit, kalapi

Its name is historically linked to kalapi, a type of rattan once abundant in the area, or is believed to signify a traditional gathering place for traders and fishermen.

== History ==
By the time Spaniards arrived, there was already a native settlement in Calape. In 1802, the Spanish governor of Cebu established it as an independent municipality.

In 1957, the barangay of Abucayan Norte was created from the sitios of Cabulihan and Cabinong, and the barangay of Abucayan Sur from the sitios of Rama and Bino. The sitios of Binogawan, Masonoy, Bentig, Cahayag, and Lawis were also constituted into barrios.

== Geography ==
Calape is bounded by Loon in the west and Tubigon in the east. To the north, the town center faces the Cebu Strait on the western side of Bohol Island, 42 kilometres (26 mi) from Tagbilaran. The jurisdiction of Calape includes the islands of Pangangan (eight barangays) and Mantatao, as well as two uninhabited islets, Poom Island and Basihan Island.

There are four rivers that flow through the territory: Tultugan and Liboron Rivers that drain into Calape Bay, and Calunasan and Abucayan Norte Rivers that drain into Tipcan Bay.

Most of the coastal area is a fairly level plain that gradually rises into rolling hills of coralline limestone. The highest point in Calape is Mount Candungao in the eastern portion of the town, with an elevation of 150 metres (500 ft) above sea level.

=== Barangays ===
Calape is politically subdivided into 33 barangays. Each barangay consists of puroks and some have sitios.

There are 18 barangays which form part of coastal area.

PSGC	Barangay	Population			±% p.a.	
		2024		2010		
071210001	Abucayan Norte	4.2%	1,402	1,326	▴	0.39%
071210002	Abucayan Sur	2.8%	912	786	▴	1.04%
071210003	Banlasan	2.2%	736	755	▾	−0.18%
071210004	Bentig	5.9%	1,949	1,797	▴	0.56%
071210005	Binogawan	1.3%	428	466	▾	−0.59%
071210006	Bonbon	3.9%	1,296	1,222	▴	0.41%
071210007	Cabayugan	2.8%	920	880	▴	0.31%
071210008	Cabudburan	1.5%	507	548	▾	−0.54%
071210009	Calunasan	2.2%	718	798	▾	−0.73%
071210010	Camias	1.4%	468	505	▾	−0.53%
071210011	Canguha	0.9%	300	283	▴	0.41%
071210012	Catmonan	4.1%	1,354	1,221	▴	0.72%
071210013	Desamparados (Poblacion)	2.4%	786	880	▾	−0.78%
071210014	Kahayag	1.6%	530	512	▴	0.24%
071210015	Kinabag‑an	1.9%	639	511	▴	1.56%
071210016	Labuon	1.6%	542	562	▾	−0.25%
071210017	Lawis	1.9%	635	617	▴	0.20%
071210018	Liboron	4.4%	1,453	1,434	▴	0.09%
071210019	Lo‑oc	1.4%	458	506	▾	−0.69%
071210020	Lomboy	1.5%	488	490	▾	−0.03%
071210021	Lucob	4.3%	1,431	1,330	▴	0.51%
071210022	Madangog	2.2%	724	622	▴	1.06%
071210023	Magtongtong	1.9%	639	404	▴	3.23%
071210024	Mandaug	4.1%	1,358	1,451	▾	−0.46%
071210025	Mantatao	2.6%	849	967	▾	−0.90%
071210027	Sampoangon	1.2%	407	373	▴	0.61%
071210028	San Isidro	6.6%	2,195	2,412	▾	−0.65%
071210029	Santa Cruz (Poblacion)	7.8%	2,590	2,401	▴	0.53%
071210030	Sojoton	1.5%	491	664	▾	−2.07%
071210031	Talisay	1.4%	470	415	▴	0.87%
071210032	Tinibgan	2.1%	685	733	▾	−0.47%
071210033	Tultugan	2.7%	900	830	▴	0.56%
071210034	Ulbujan	4.9%	1,603	1,445	▴	0.72%
	Total		33,022	30,146	▴	0.63%

=== Climate ===
Climate data for Calape, Bohol
Month	Jan	Feb	Mar	Apr	May	Jun	Jul	Aug	Sep	Oct	Nov	Dec	Year
Mean daily maximum °C (°F)	28 (82)	28 (82)	29 (84)	31 (88)	31 (88)	30 (86)	30 (86)	30 (86)	30 (86)	29 (84)	29 (84)	28 (82)	29 (85)
Mean daily minimum °C (°F)	23 (73)	23 (73)	23 (73)	23 (73)	24 (75)	24 (75)	24 (75)	24 (75)	24 (75)	24 (75)	24 (75)	23 (73)	24 (74)
Average precipitation mm (inches)	98 (3.9)	82 (3.2)	96 (3.8)	71 (2.8)	104 (4.1)	129 (5.1)	101 (4.0)	94 (3.7)	99 (3.9)	135 (5.3)	174 (6.9)	143 (5.6)	1,326 (52.3)
Average rainy days	18.0	14.1	17.1	16.8	23.7	25.7	25.8	23.3	24.2	25.9	24.0	20.6	259.2
Source: Meteoblue (modeled/calculated data, not measured locally)

== Demographics ==
Population census of Calape

Year	Pop.	±% p.a.
1903	13,354	—
1918	18,392	+2.16%
1939	21,319	+0.71%
1948	21,383	+0.03%
1960	22,820	+0.54%
1970	20,888	−0.88%

Year	Pop.	±% p.a.
1975	21,499	+0.58%
1980	22,488	+0.90%
1990	24,608	+0.91%
1995	26,051	+1.07%
2000	27,921	+1.50%
2007	29,786	+0.90%

Year	Pop.	±% p.a.
2010	30,146	+0.44%
2015	30,863	+0.45%
2020	33,079	+1.47%
2024	33,022	−0.04%

Source: Philippine Statistics Authority

=== Religion ===
92% of Calape's population is Roman Catholic. The remaining 8% is divided among other religious groups.

== Economy ==
Poverty incidence of Calape (%)

Source: Philippine Statistics Authority

== Education ==
Calape boasts a high literacy rate, with 93.09% of its population being literate as of a 2007 survey.

=== Public Schools ===
==== Elementary Education ====
- Banlasan Elementary School
- Bentig-Calunasan Elementary School
- Bonbon-Catmonan Elementary School
- Cabayugan Elementary School
- Cabudburan Elementary School
- Calape Central Elementary School
- Camias Elementary School
- Canguha Elementary School
- Kinabag-an Elementary School
- Labuon Elementary School
- Mandaug Elementary School
- Mandaug-Gamay Elementary School
- Mantatao Elementary School
- Pangangan Elementary School
- Sampoangon Elementary School
- San Isidro Elementary School
- Tinibgan Elementary School
- Tultugan Elementary School
- Ulbujan Elementary School

==== Secondary Education ====
- Calape National High School
- Fermin Tayabas National High School
- Mayor Anunciacion R. Tuazon National School of Fisheries
- Pangangan National High School

==== Higher Education ====
- Bohol Island State University
  - Program offerings
    - College of Teacher Education
      - Bachelor of Elementary Education
      - Bachelor of Secondary Education major in English
      - Bachelor of Secondary Education major in Mathematics
    - College of Technology
      - Bachelor of Science in Computer Science
      - Bachelor of Science in Industrial Technology major in Food Preparation and Services Technology
      - Bachelor of Science in Industrial Technology major in Electrical Technology
    - College of Midwifery
      - Bachelor of Science in Midwifery
    - College of Fisheries
      - Bachelor of Science in Fisheries

=== Private Schools ===
- Calape Baptist Mission School, Inc.
- St. Teresa's School of Valladolid, Inc.

== Government ==
During the Spanish colonial period in the Philippines, the chief executive of a town was known as the Capitan Municipal. This title later evolved into Presidente Municipal (English: Municipal President) during the early American regime. Eventually, the title Municipal Mayor became standard, especially during the Commonwealth period and onward. During wartime or transitional governments, such as under Japanese occupation or post-liberation, the term Mayor was commonly used for town chief executives, sometimes appointed by military or provisional authorities.

In earlier times, the selection of town leaders sometimes involved a drawing of lots (sortition) among prominent individuals from the principalia class—those with significant landholdings, formal education, and Spanish literacy. However, the exact sequence of tenure for these early town executives is often undocumented or difficult to reconstruct due to limited archival records.

Regular elections for this position were introduced under the American colonial administration through the Municipal Code (Act No. 82 of 1901), with elections initially held every three years. This three-year term remains in effect for municipal mayors under the Local Government Code of 1991 (Republic Act No. 7160).

Following the EDSA People Power Revolution in 1986, elected local officials were removed from office and replaced by Officers-in-Charge (OICs) appointed by the new government. This transitional arrangement remained in place until regular local elections resumed in 1988.

=== List of chief executives ===
- Mauricio T. Cuario (1923–1927)
- Benigno Palacio (1933–1937)
- Felomeno Ruiz (1938–1941)
- Gaudencio Sepe (1942–1945)
- Pedro Dumadag (1946–1951)
- Ramon E. Nazareno (1952–1955)
- Alberto Carlon (1956–1963)
- Arsenio G. Damalerio (1964–1967)
- Isidro R. Redulla (1968–1979)
- Anunciacion R. Tuazon (1979–1986)
- Gabriel P. de la Peña (1986–1987)
- Gerardo T. Yu (1992–1995)
- Julius Caesar Herrera (1995–2001)
- Ernesto Cuico Herrera II (2001–2007)
- Nelson Nesia Yu (2016–2022)
- Julius Caesar Herrera (2022–2025)
- Sulpicio Nesia Yu (2007–2016 and 2025 to Present)

== Gallery ==
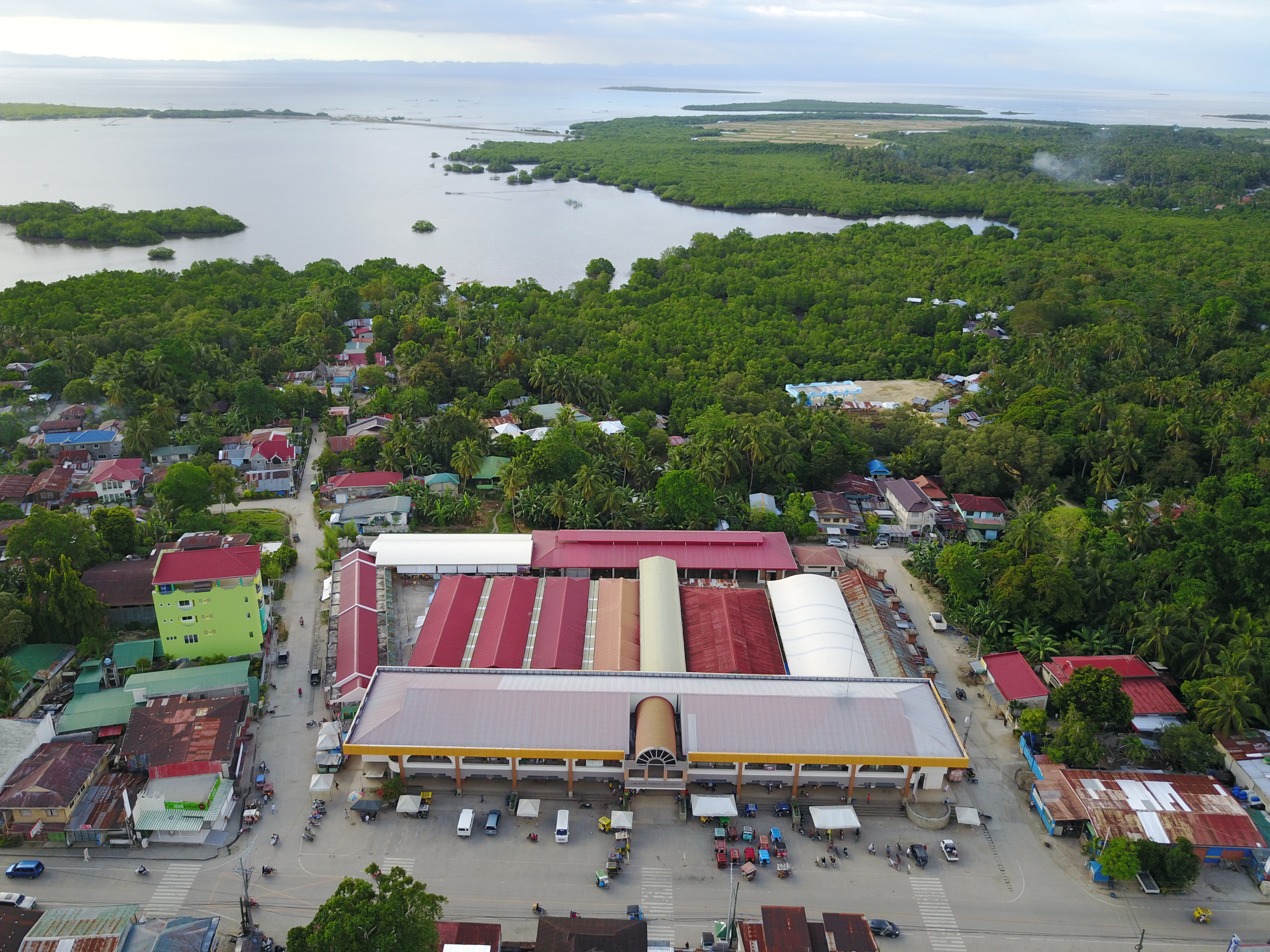
Calape Public Market

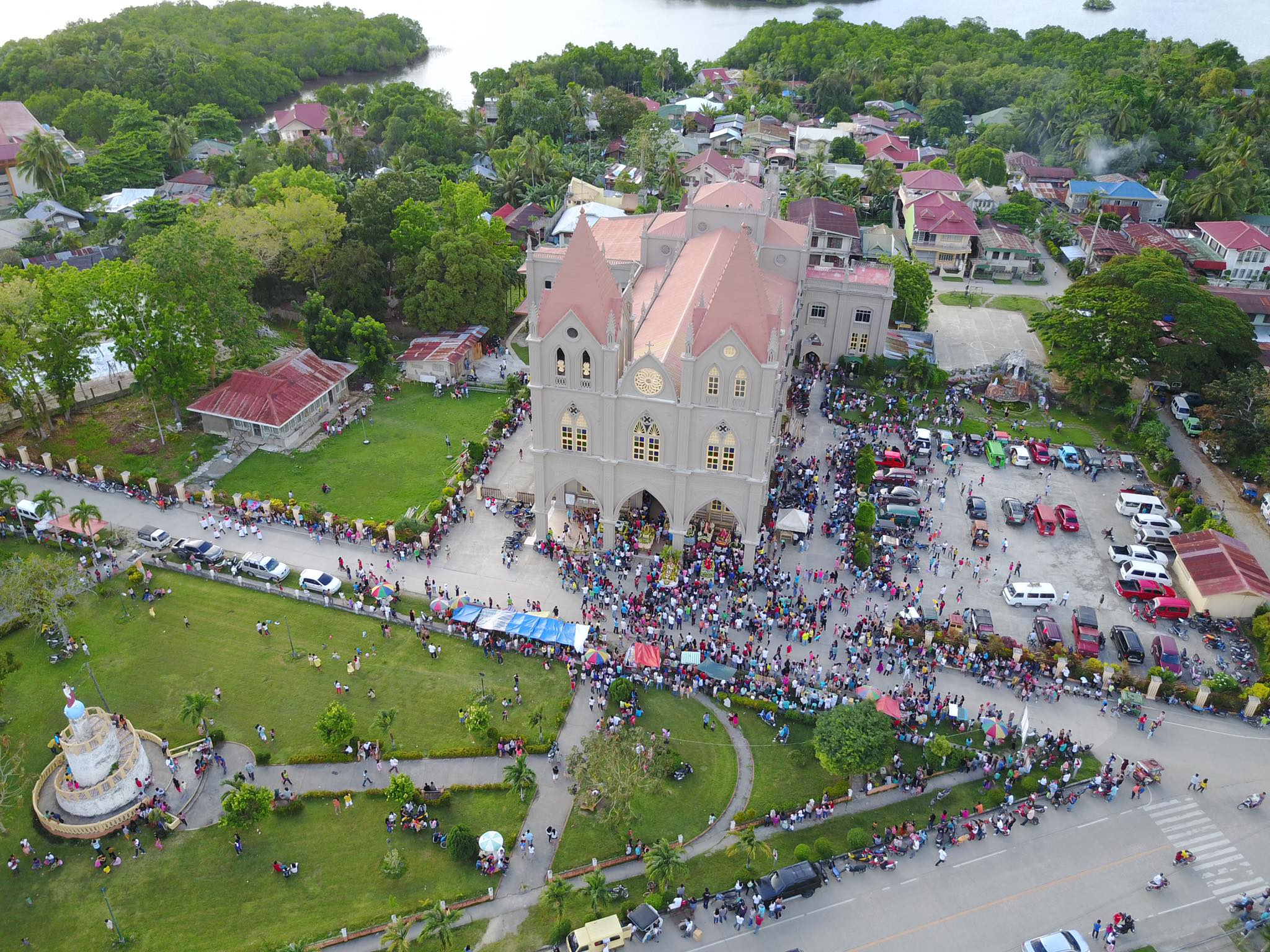
St. Vincent Ferrer Parish Church

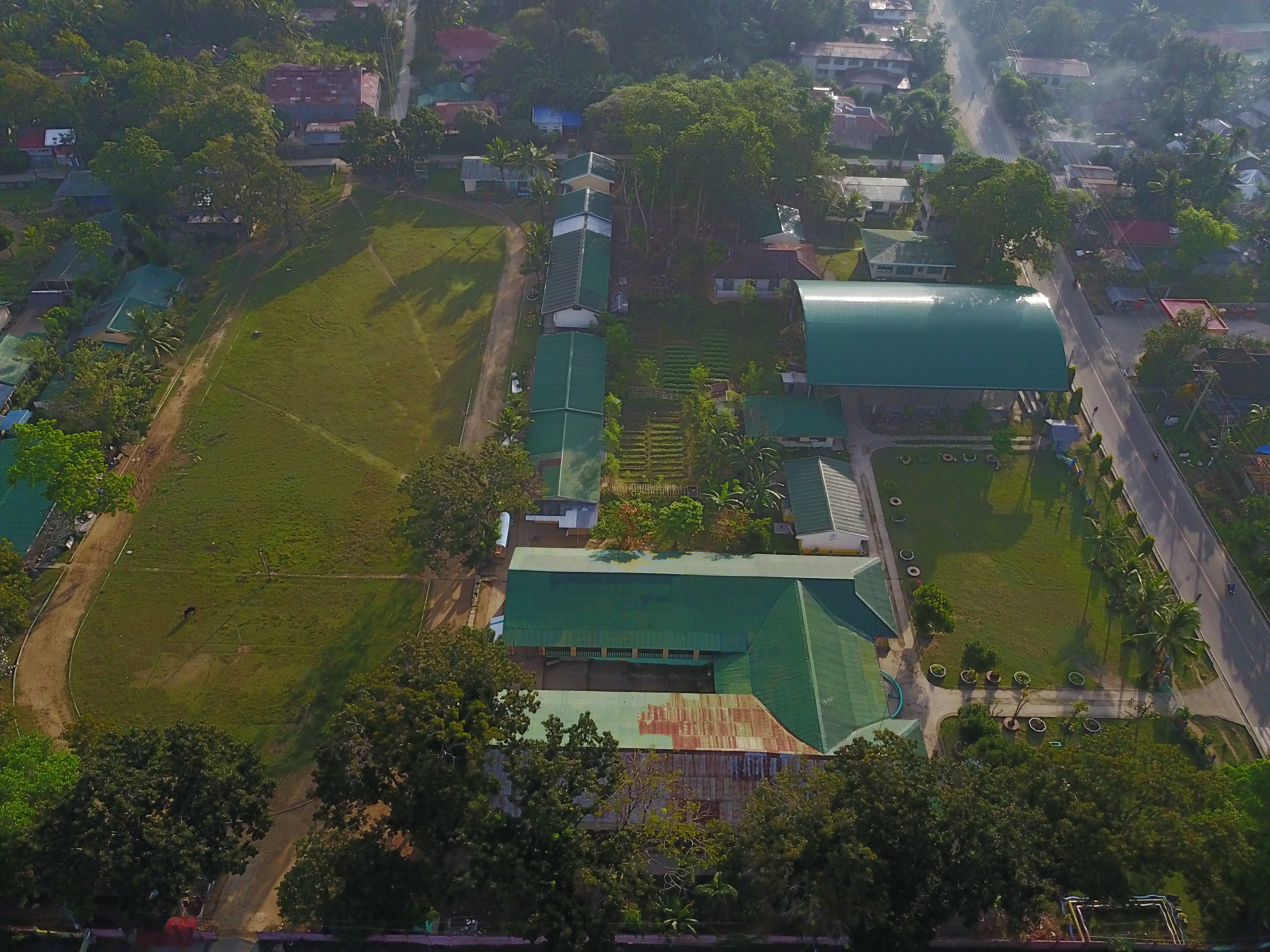
Calape Central Elementary School

== Notable personalities ==
- Yoyoy Villame, a novelty singer
- Ernesto Falar Herrera, Senator of the Philippines (1987–1998) and former congressman of Bohol's 1st district (1998–2001); a legislator in the 8th, 9th, 10th and 11th Congresses.
