= Mocaboc Island =

Philippine island

Isla sa Mocaboc
- Location within Visayas, Philippines Location within Philippines

Geography
- Coordinates: 10°4′16″N 123°55′40″E
- Adjacent to: Cebu Strait
- Area: 0.02 km^{2} (0.0077 sq mi)

Administration
- Philippines
- Region: Central Visayas
- Province: Bohol
- Municipality: Tubigon
- Barangay: Mocaboc Island

Demographics
- Population: 582 (2024)
- Pop. density: 29,100/km^{2} (75400/sq mi)
- Ethnic groups: Cebuano

Mocaboc is an island in the Philippines, situated approximately 14 km (8.7 mi) off the northwest of the island of Bohol. Located in the Cebu Strait, the island is part of the chain of islands situated in the Danajon Bank, the only double barrier reef in the country famous for its rich marine resources. Mocaboc Island is part of the jurisdiction of the municipality of Tubigon, Bohol. Most families of Mocaboc rely on fishing and is known for supplying Ginamos or fermented fish. According to the latest 2024 Census, the total population of Mocaboc is 582. With an estimated area of only 0.02 km^{2} (0.0077 sq mi), the island has a high population density.

The white beach sandbar in Mocaboc has attracted many tourists and it has become one of the go-to destinations in island-hopping tours.

The island has one public school, Mocaboc Elementary School. and a diesel power plant operated by the National Power Corporation - Small Power Utilities Group. The distribution of the generated power is handled by Bohol I Electric Cooperative Inc.

== Recent History ==
A motorized bangka on route to Mocaboc Island collided with a passenger ship, MV Lite Ferry 20 on November 1, 2017. The accident caused the death of 1 person and injured several people. They were travelling to the island to observe All Saints' Day.

Assisted by the Philippine Coast Guard, the residents of the island conducted a preemptive evacuation in preparation for the onslaught of Typhoon Rai or known as Super Typhoon Odette in the Philippines. In its aftermath, many houses were damaged, including government facilities and fishing boats.

== See also ==
- List of islands by population density
