= Pasil Fish Market =

Fish wholesale market in Cebu City, Philippines

- Location: Brgy. Suba, Cebu City, Philippines; 10.289643°N 123.891417°E
- Opening date: 1921
- Management: Office of the City Markets
- Owner: Cebu City Government
- Goods sold: Seafood
- Interactive map of Pasil Fish Market

The Pasil Fish Market is a major fish market located in Barangay Suba, Cebu City, Philippines. Established in 1921, the market is a major market for fresh fish sourced throughout the seas of Visayas, such as Visayan Sea, Samar Sea, Camotes Sea, and Bohol Strait, among others.

The Pasil Fish Port started as a market, which was constructed with light materials and had wooden stalls. It was originally part of Barangay Pasil, thus its name. After a city ordinance dividing Pasil into two separate barangays (to be named Pasil and Suba) was approved, it was determined that the market was situated within the boundaries of the new barangay of Suba. It was later renovated in the 80s under the term of then-Cebu City mayor Tomas Osmeña when an agreement was negotiated with the government of Belgium for the construction of a nearby fish port. Through City Ordinance No. 1419, the city government in March 1992 renamed Bugallon Street, where the market is located, to Belgium Street to recognize the Belgian government's role in the area's economic development.

Several incidents of protected species and products derived from them being sold in the market have also been reported such as manta ray, sting ray, green sea turtle, and shark meat.

On May 3, 2020, Cebu City Mayor Edgardo Labella ordered the temporary closure of the market, including the Suba Fish Port, due to the COVID-19 pandemic. It was scheduled to reopen on August 15, 2020 but was moved to August 28, 2020.
