= Ubay Island =

Island in Cebu Strait, Philippines

Isla sa Ubay
- Location within Visayas, Philippines Location within Philippines

Geography
- Coordinates: 10°1′29″N 123°58′0″E
- Adjacent to: Cebu Strait
- Area: 0.01 km^{2} (0.0039 sq mi)
- Highest elevation: 2.32 m (7.61 ft)

Administration
- Philippines
- Region: Central Visayas
- Province: Bohol
- Municipality: Tubigon
- Barangay: Ubay

Demographics
- Population: 172 (2024)
- Pop. density: 17,200/km^{2} (44500/sq mi)
- Ethnic groups: Cebuano

Ubay Island is an island situated in Cebu Strait, a narrow strait between the islands of Bohol and Cebu, Philippines. The island is around 7 km (4.3 mi) northwest from Bohol and is one of the islands located in the Danajon Bank, the only double barrier reef in the country. Ubay Island is under the jurisdiction of the municipality of Tubigon, Bohol. The total population of Ubay Island is 172.

== See also ==
- List of islands by population density
