= Bohol Bantay Balita =

Cebuano language weekly newspaper

Bohol Bantay Balita (BBN) is a weekly newspaper published each Sunday in Tagbilaran, Bohol, in the Central Visayas region of the Philippines. It is the only newspaper in the province of Bohol in Cebuano language. Bantay Balita started its operations in April 2005, and has an average circulation of 2,000 copies. It later became an online newspaper.
