= Antequera, Bohol =

Municipality in Bohol, Philippines

Antequera Antekera
- Municipality
- Municipality of Antequera
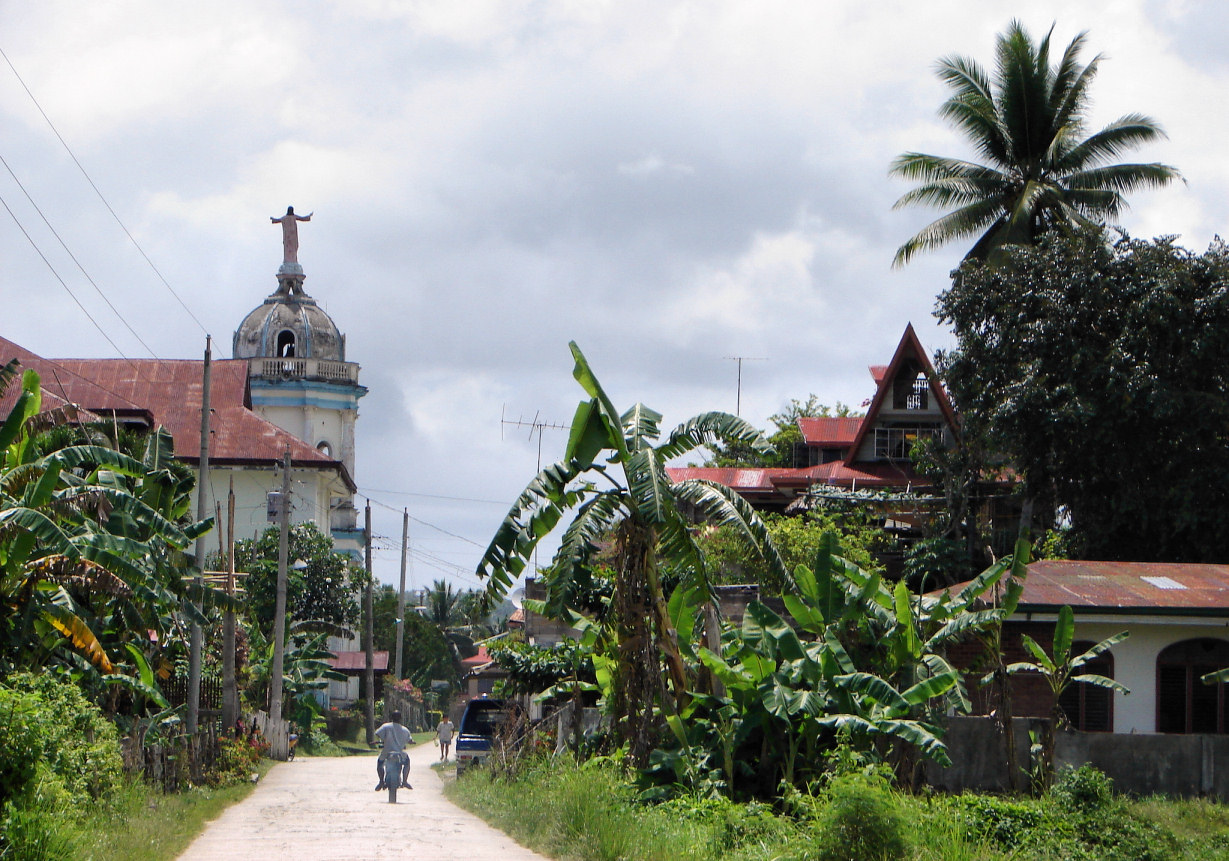

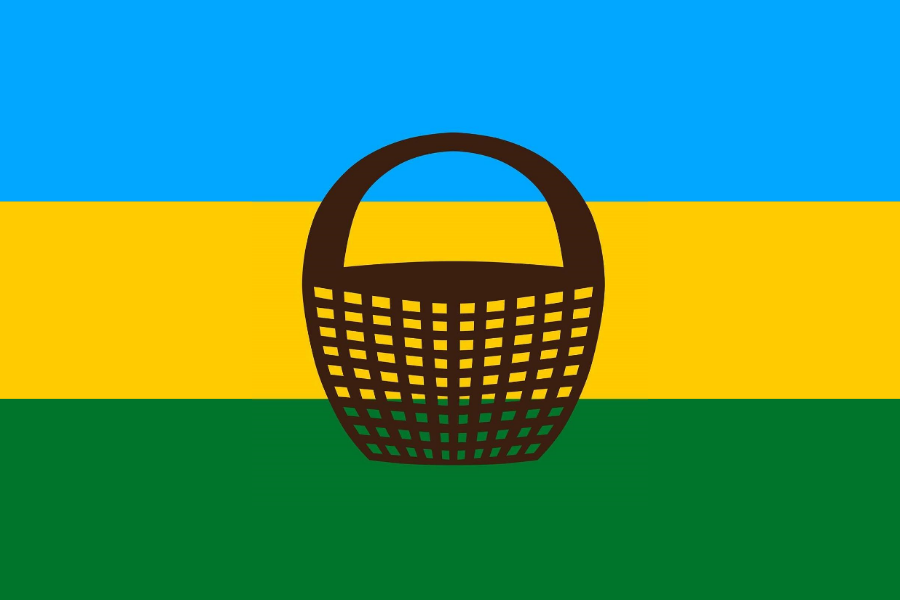
- Flag

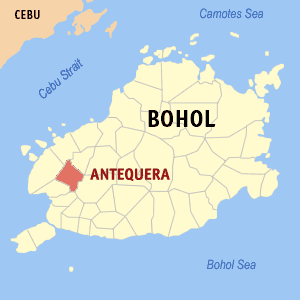
- Map of Bohol with Antequera highlighted
- Interactive map of Antequera
- Location within the Philippines
- Coordinates: 9°46′52″N 123°53′51″E
- Country: Philippines
- Region: Central Visayas
- Province: Bohol
- District: 1st district
- Founded: 17 March 1876
- Named for: Antequera, Spain
- Barangays: 21 (see Barangays)

Government
  - Type: Sangguniang Bayan
  - Mayor: Jose Mario J. Pahang
  - Vice Mayor: Cecilia B. Rebosura-Salomon
  - Representative: John Geesnell Yap
  - Municipal Council: Members: Jan Mark J. Merencillo; Al P. Coquilla; Evelyn Rebosura-Napitan; Fernando B. Vallecer; Tarcisia R. Baluca; Lanieel M. Labado; Nestor C. Villas; Edwin P. Cuenca
  - Electorate: 10,559 voters (2025)

Area
  - Total: 118.60 km^{2} (45.79 sq mi)
- Elevation: 120 m (390 ft)
- Highest elevation: 322 m (1,056 ft)
- Lowest elevation: 3 m (9.8 ft)

Population (2024 census)
  - Total: 14,881
  - Density: 125.47/km^{2} (324.97/sq mi)
  - Households: 3,796

Economy
  - Income class: 4th municipal income class
  - Poverty incidence: 14.25% (2023)
  - Revenue: ₱ 130.5 million (2024)
  - Assets: ₱ 388 million (2024)
  - Expenditure: ₱ 56.42 million (2024)
  - Liabilities: ₱ 44.47 million (2024)

Service provider
  - Electricity: Bohol 1 Electric Cooperative (BOHECO 1)
- Time zone: UTC+8 (PST)
- ZIP code: 6335
- PSGC: 071204000
- IDD : area code: +63 (0)38
- Native languages: Boholano dialect Cebuano; Tagalog
- Feast date: Every Last Saturday of October
- Patron saint: Our Lady of the Holy Rosary
- Website: www.antequera-bohol.lgu.ph

Antequera, officially the Municipality of Antequera (Cebuano: Munisipalidad sa Antequera; Tagalog: Bayan ng Antequera), is a municipality in the province of Bohol, Philippines. According to the 2024 census, it has a population of 14,881 people.

Popular places of interest in Antequera are the weekly basket market and the town's topography. The Mag-Aso Falls (found in Brgy. Can-omay, not to be confused with Brgy. Mag-aso) is the most well known tourist spot in the whole town. Its falls whose cascading waters run into natural pools, were greatly altered by the 2013 Bohol earthquake and even more so by flash floods caused by Tropical Storm Seniang in December 2014.Tubig Dako and Inambacan Falls are also great spots for picnics and water activities. Mt. Cancai is a popular spot for hiking and is known for its cross as the 14th station during the station of the cross. It is usually visited during advent, holy week, and other religious events.

The town of Antequera, Bohol celebrates its feast on every last Saturday of October, to honor the town patron Our Lady of the Rosary. The town also celebrates the feast of Sr. San Antonio de Padua every 13 June.

== History ==
The early inhabitants of the area were the Eskaya people, who lived in western Bohol, including the lowlands of Antequera at the present barangay of Viga, from the 7th century until the early 17th century.

Originally the town was a barangay of Maribojoc known as Agad. Migration from surrounding coastal areas increased the population and created many new sitios. On 17 March 1876, the Governor-General of the Philippines signed a decree that made Agad and all its sitios a new municipality. That same year, the governor of the district of Bohol, Joaquin Bengoechia, enacted the law that finalized the boundaries and appointed its first mayor, Simeon Villas. The new municipality was named after the home town in Spain of Bengoechia.

Antequera's name was said to be from Roman origin, Anticaria, Antikaria, Antiquaria, that could mean "ancient city", "antique city" or "city of antiquities". Antikaria was also said to be from Iberian origin and approximately interprets to "in front of the great limestone mass," the limestone formation near the city in Spain. The etymology of the name is debated and is still unknown.

In 1899, the town of Catigbian was abolished, and the barangays of Caimbang, San Isidro, and Causwagan were added to Antequera. But it lost these barangays, along with half of Cansague, when Catigbian was reestablished on 17 June 1949. On 10 January 1970, the municipality of San Isidro was formed, taking the barangays of Cambansag, Abehilan, and Baunos from Antequera.

== Geography ==
Antequera is an inland town 19 kilometres (12 mi) north of Tagbilaran. This municipality is bounded by Calape in the north, San Isidro in the northeast, Balilihan in the southeast, Cortes in the south, Maribojoc in the southwest, and Loon in the northwest.

=== Barangays ===
Antequera is politically subdivided into 21 barangays. Each barangay consists of puroks and some have sitios.

PSGC	Barangay	Population			±% p.a.	
		2024		2010		
071204001	Angilan	6.4%	947	1,012	▾	−0.46%
071204002	Bantolinao	8.6%	1,274	1,226	▴	0.26%
071204003	Bicahan	5.1%	766	783	▾	−0.15%
071204004	Bitaugan	4.2%	622	591	▴	0.35%
071204005	Bungahan	5.6%	832	744	▴	0.77%
071204007	Canlaas	4.4%	650	736	▾	−0.85%
071204008	Cansibuan	3.8%	569	512	▴	0.73%
071204009	Can‑omay	3.6%	543	721	▾	−1.93%
071204010	Celing	4.6%	684	671	▴	0.13%
071204011	Danao	3.2%	473	453	▴	0.30%
071204012	Danicop	4.4%	659	576	▴	0.93%
071204013	Mag‑aso	2.7%	407	434	▾	−0.44%
071204014	Poblacion	9.4%	1,404	1,332	▴	0.36%
071204015	Quinapon‑an	1.9%	283	278	▴	0.12%
071204016	Santo Rosario	3.5%	528	475	▴	0.73%
071204017	Tabuan	3.9%	579	584	▾	−0.06%
071204018	Tagubaas	3.1%	456	386	▴	1.15%
071204019	Tupas	5.7%	850	935	▾	−0.65%
071204020	Ubojan (Obujan)	3.0%	450	529	▾	−1.10%
071204021	Viga	3.9%	586	614	▾	−0.32%
071204022	Villa Aurora (Canoc‑oc)	5.8%	863	889	▾	−0.20%
	Total		14,881	14,481	▴	0.19%

=== Climate ===
Climate data for Antequera, Bohol
Month	Jan	Feb	Mar	Apr	May	Jun	Jul	Aug	Sep	Oct	Nov	Dec	Year
Mean daily maximum °C (°F)	28 (82)	28 (82)	29 (84)	31 (88)	31 (88)	30 (86)	29 (84)	29 (84)	29 (84)	29 (84)	28 (82)	28 (82)	29 (84)
Mean daily minimum °C (°F)	22 (72)	22 (72)	22 (72)	23 (73)	24 (75)	24 (75)	24 (75)	24 (75)	24 (75)	23 (73)	23 (73)	22 (72)	23 (74)
Average precipitation mm (inches)	102 (4.0)	85 (3.3)	91 (3.6)	75 (3.0)	110 (4.3)	141 (5.6)	121 (4.8)	107 (4.2)	111 (4.4)	144 (5.7)	169 (6.7)	139 (5.5)	1,395 (55.1)
Average rainy days	18.6	14.8	16.5	16.7	23.9	26.4	25.6	24.1	24.4	26.3	23.7	20.5	261.5
Source: Meteoblue (modeled/calculated data, not measured locally)

== Demographics ==
Population census of Antequera

Year	Pop.	±% p.a.
1903	7,578	—
1918	11,129	+2.60%
1939	15,974	+1.74%
1948	16,070	+0.07%
1960	12,254	−2.23%
1970	10,397	−1.63%

Year	Pop.	±% p.a.
1975	11,130	+1.38%
1980	11,641	+0.90%
1990	12,348	+0.59%
1995	12,072	−0.42%
2000	13,758	+2.84%
2007	14,357	+0.59%

Year	Pop.	±% p.a.
2010	14,481	+0.31%
2015	14,425	−0.07%
2020	14,990	+0.81%
2024	14,881	−0.18%

Source: Philippine Statistics Authority

== Economy ==
Poverty incidence of Antequera (%)

Source: Philippine Statistics Authority

The primary economic activities are farming, handicraft or cottage industries (especially basket weaving), and carpentry (including bamboo and wood furniture making). Its main agricultural produce comprises coconut, rice, corn, rootcrops, and vegetables.

Total annual income in 2010 was ₱35,960,730

== Government ==
=== List of former chief executives ===
List of former mayors of Antequera:

- Vicente Tambis - 1896–1897
- Julian Calipes - 1909–1911
- Pedro Omila - 1912–1915
- Eufemio Morgia - 1919–1922
- Eustaquio Tambis - 1922–1925
- Eufemio Morgia - 1926–1934
- Luis Gementiza - 1934–1937
- Luis Gementiza - 1938–1940
- Demetrio Jadulco - 1940–1941
- Leoncio Paña - 1943–1945
- Eufemio Morgia - 1944
- Demetrio Jadulco - 1945–1946
- Luis Gementiza - 1946–1951
- Sabino Rebosura - 1952–1963
- Conrad Vallestero - 1963
- Isabelito Tongco - 1964–1992
- Vicente Nunag - 1987–1988
- Arnulfo Labendia - 1992
- Felipe Gementiza - 1992–1998
- Samuel Rebosura - 1998–2007
- Cecelia Rebosura - 2007–2010
- Jose Mario Pahang - 2010–2019
- Lil Nunag - 2019–2022
- Jose Mario Pahang - 2022–present

== Gallery ==
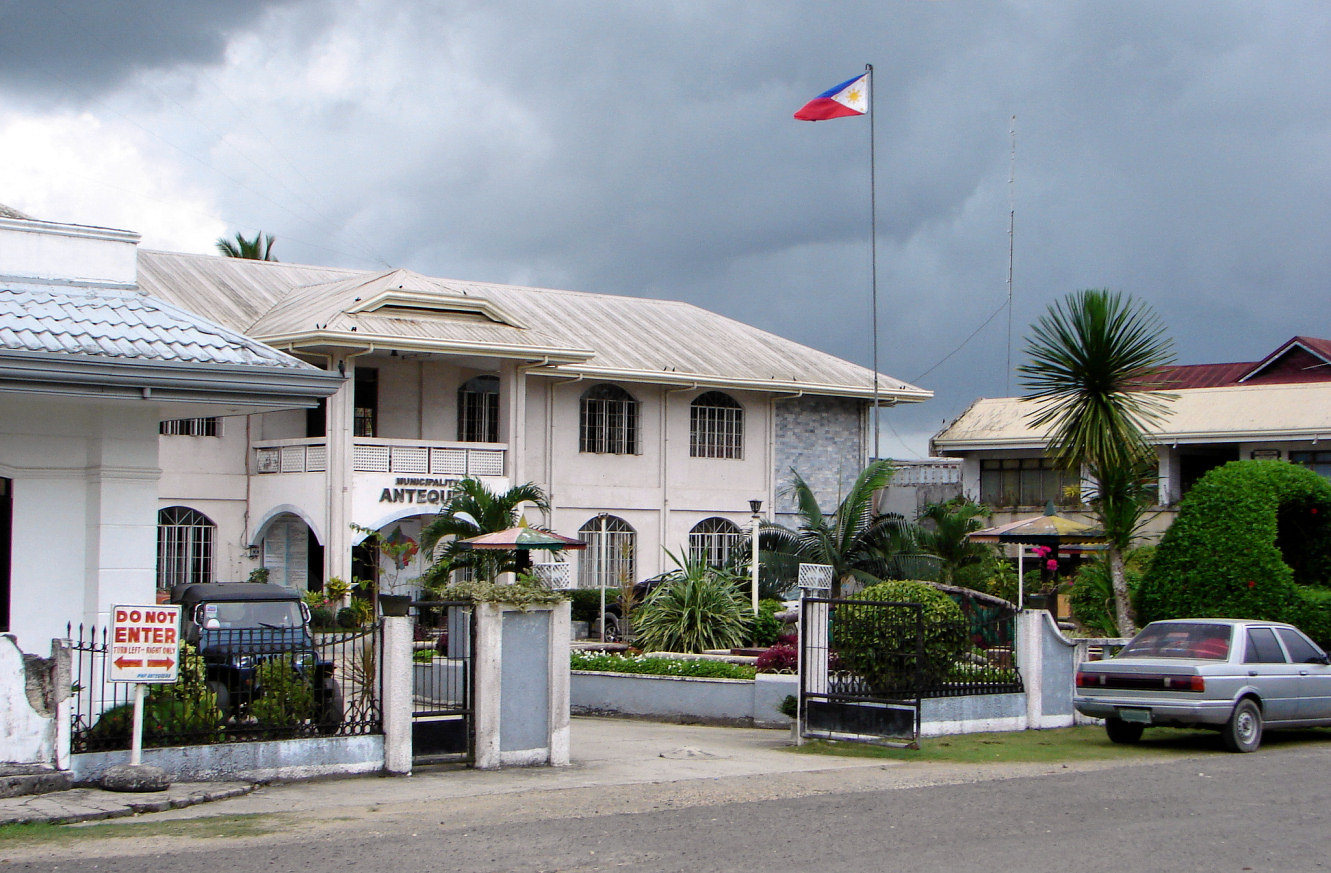
Town hall

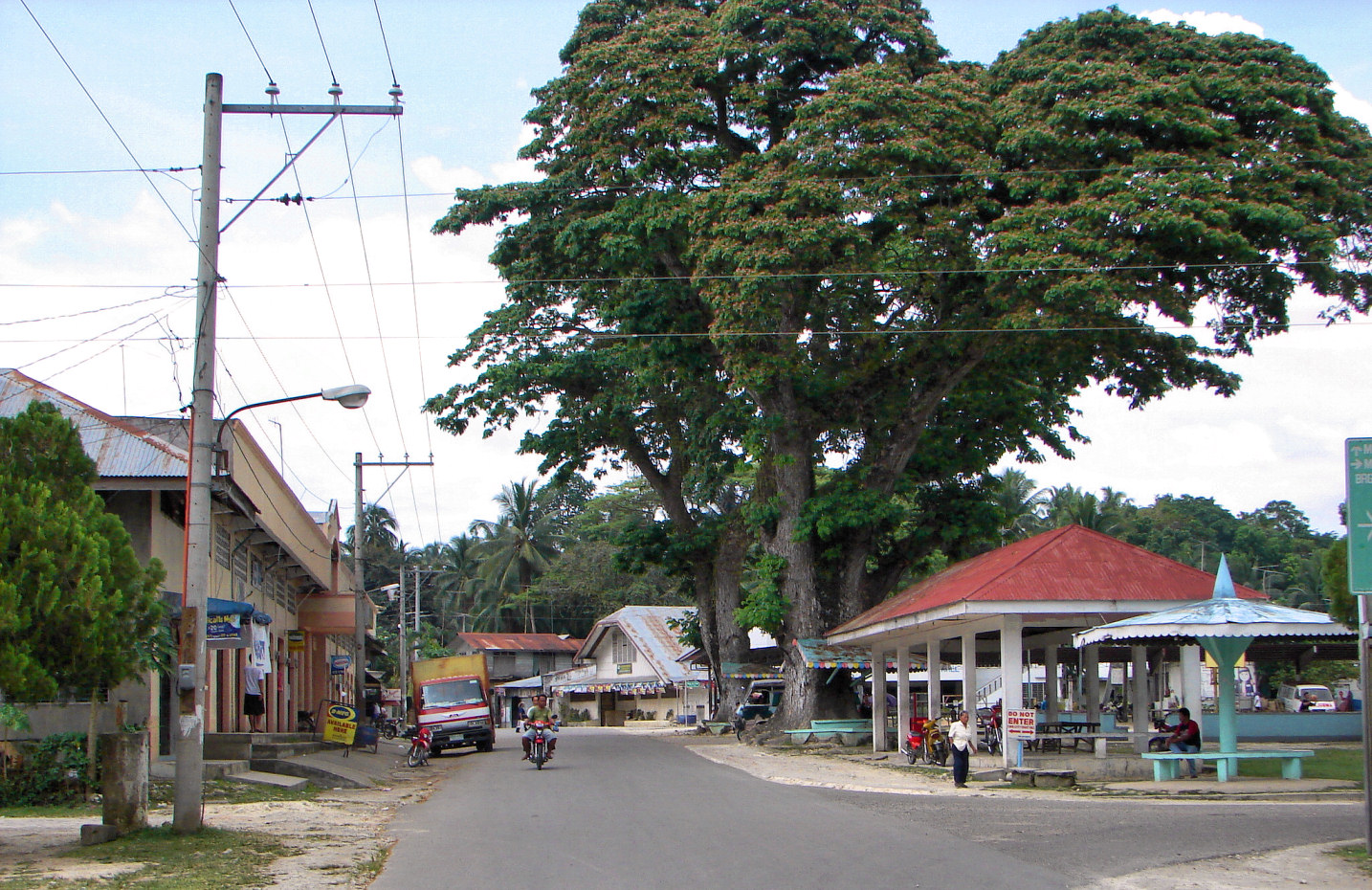
Poblacion

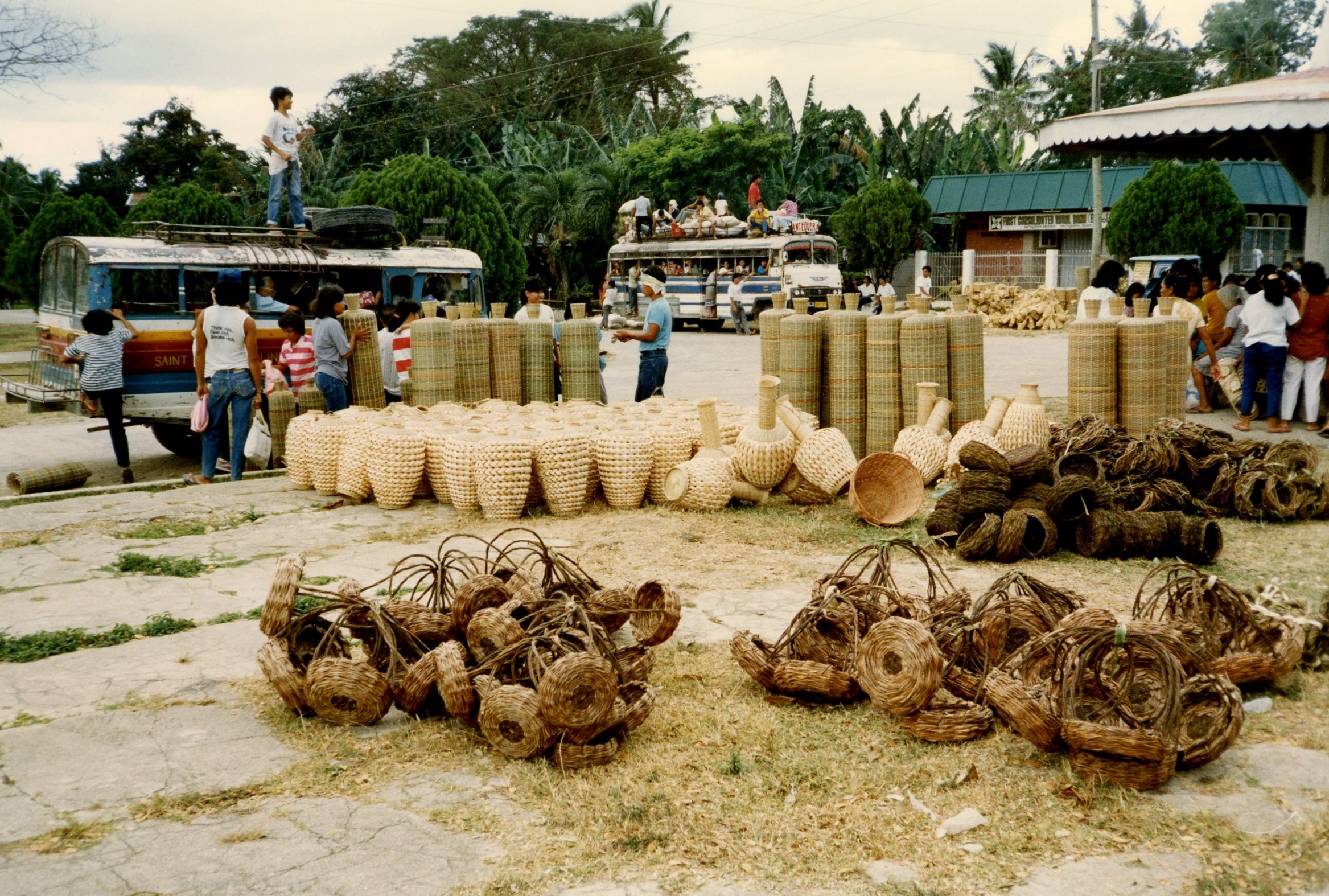
Basket market

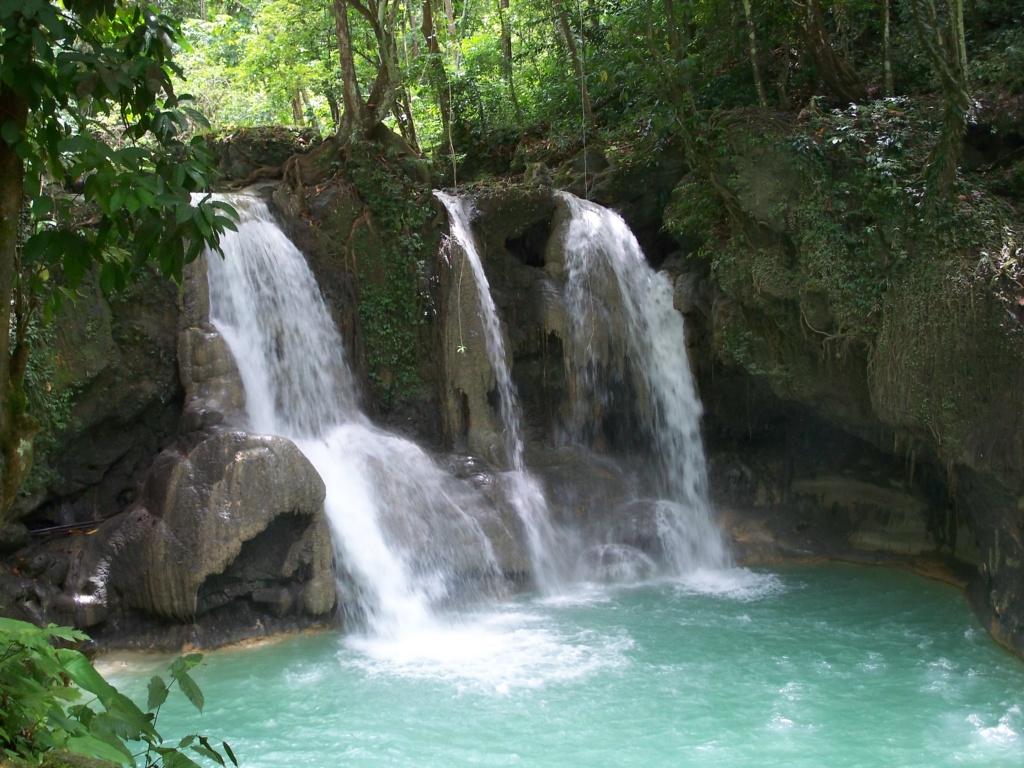
Mag-Aso Falls

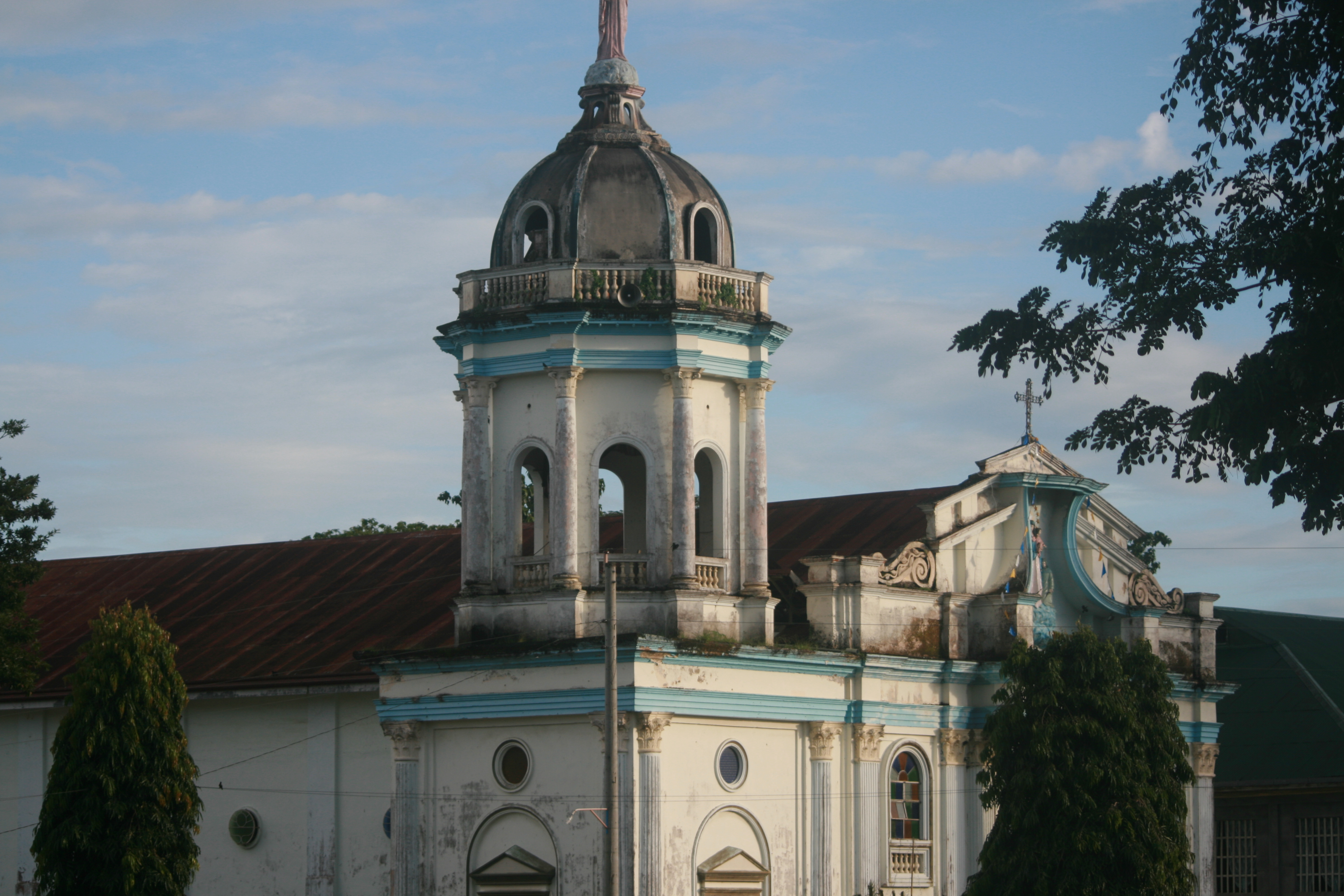
View of church

== Sources ==
- Municipality of Antequera. "Brief municipal profile". Archived from the original on 25 October 2012.
- Municipality of Antequera, Russell Glenn L. Lomotos. "History of Antequera". Archived from the original on 25 October 2012.
- Municipality of Antequera. "Antequera Mayors". Archived from the original on 25 October 2012.
- "Waterfalls you must see in Bohol". boholchronicle.com.ph. The Bohol Chronicle. 26 April 2015. Archived from the original on 10 August 2015.
