= Batuan, Bohol =

Municipality in Bohol, Philippines

Batuan
- Municipality
- Municipality of Batuan
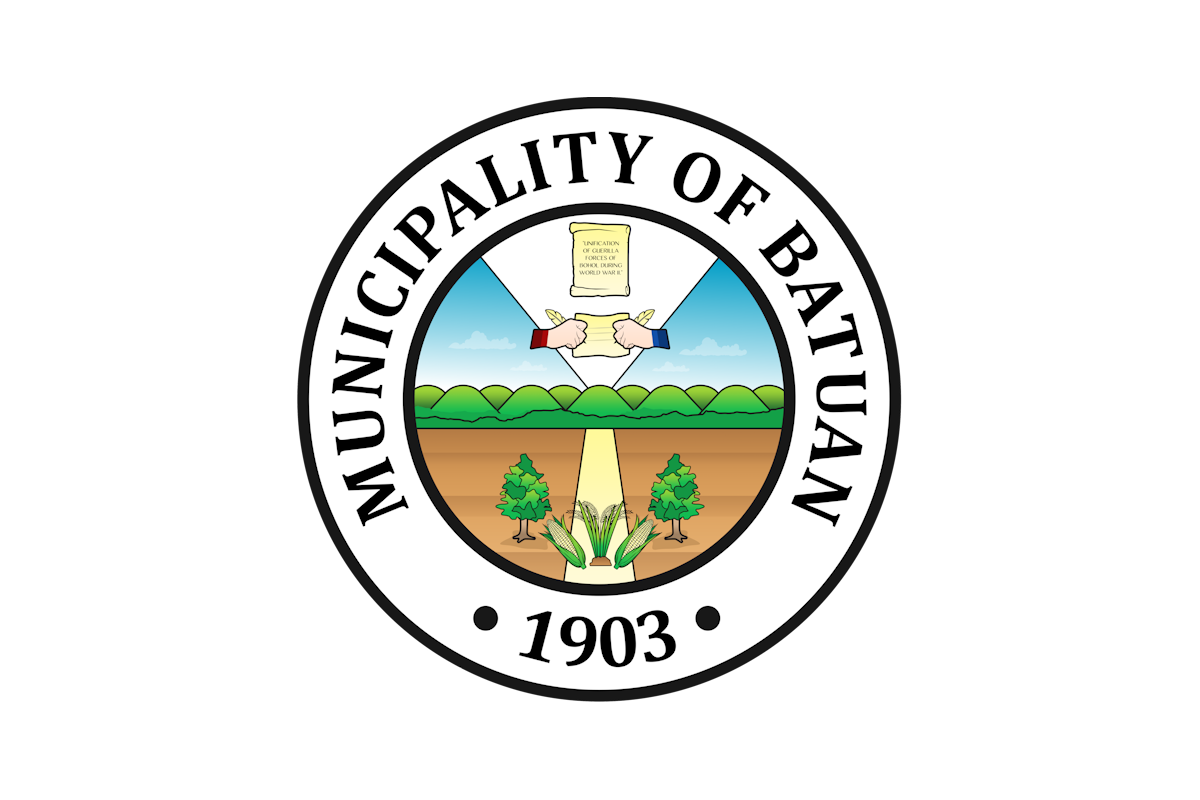
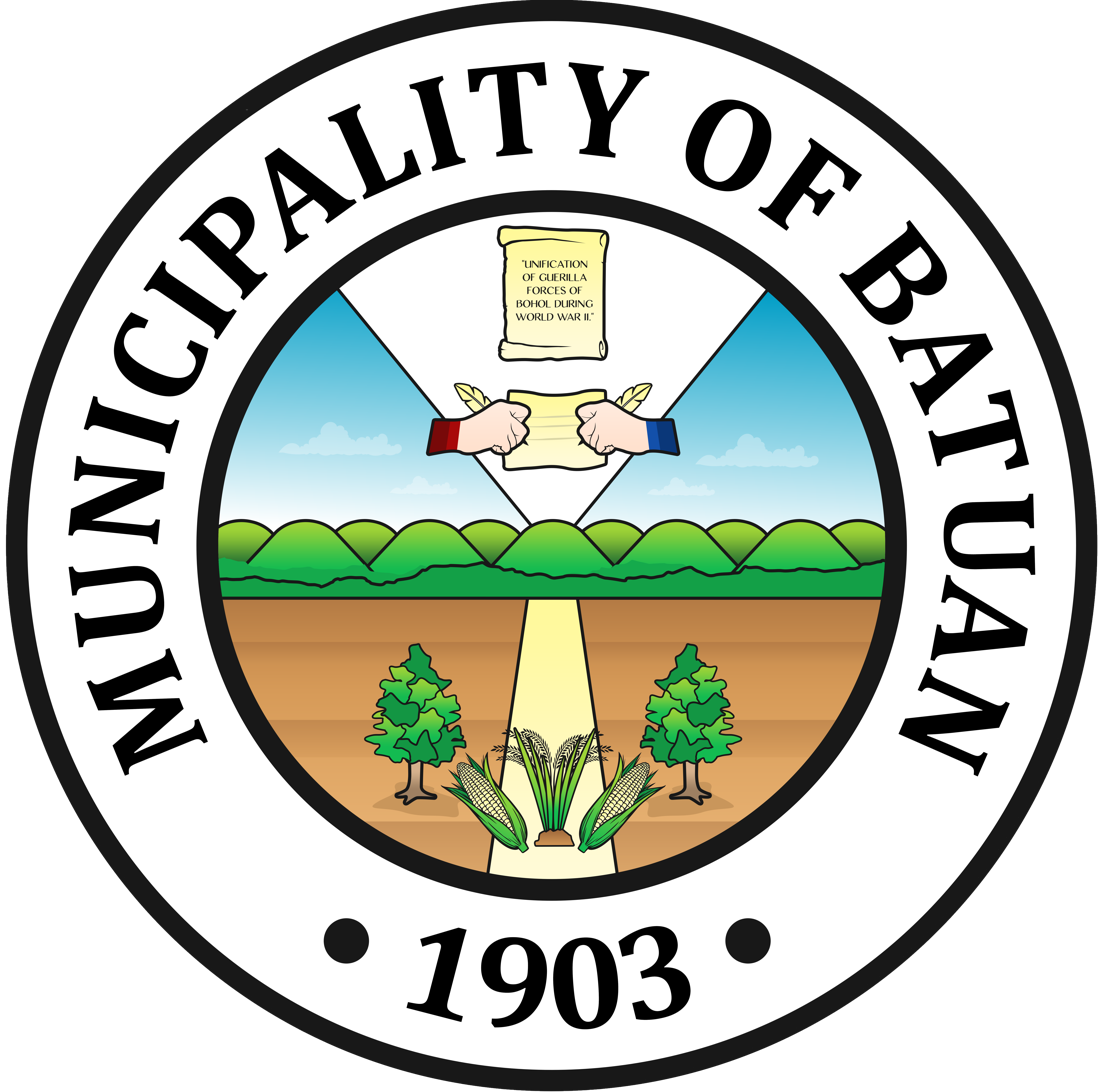
- Flag Seal

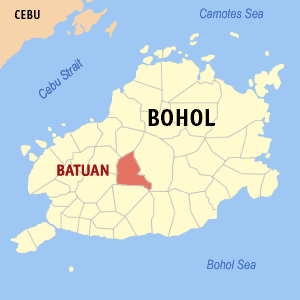
- Map of Bohol with Batuan highlighted
- Interactive map of Batuan
- Location within the Philippines
- Coordinates: 9°48′N 124°08′E
- Country: Philippines
- Region: Central Visayas
- Province: Bohol
- District: 3rd district
- Founded: 31 October 1903
- Barangays: 15 (see Barangays)

Government
  - Type: Sangguniang Bayan
  - Mayor: Emmanuel Tumanda
  - Vice Mayor: Antonino M Jumawid
  - Representative: Kristine Alexie B. Tutor
  - Municipal Council: Members: Joel Daquis; Yes Dumagan-Baguio; Sixto T. Dano; Marvin Pancho; Ronald T. Dampog; Jesus Palingcod; Dodong Salces; Segundo Bautista
  - Electorate: 10,601 voters (2025)

Area
  - Total: 79.08 km^{2} (30.53 sq mi)
- Elevation: 317 m (1,040 ft)
- Highest elevation: 516 m (1,693 ft)
- Lowest elevation: 195 m (640 ft)

Population (2024 census)
  - Total: 14,423
  - Density: 182.4/km^{2} (472.4/sq mi)
  - Households: 3,197

Economy
  - Income class: 4th municipal income class
  - Poverty incidence: 20.74% (2023)
  - Revenue: ₱ 103.8 million (2024)
  - Assets: ₱ 449.4 million (2024)
  - Expenditure: ₱ 53.47 million (2024)
  - Liabilities: ₱ 67.21 million (2024)

Service provider
  - Electricity: Bohol 1 Electric Cooperative (BOHECO 1)
- Time zone: UTC+8 (PST)
- ZIP code: 6318
- PSGC: 071207000
- IDD : area code: +63 (0)38
- Native languages: Boholano dialect Cebuano; Tagalog

Batuan, officially the Municipality of Batuan (Cebuano: Lungsod sa Batuan; Tagalog: Bayan ng Batuan), is a municipality in the province of Bohol, Philippines. According to the 2024 census, it has a population of 14,423 people.

Batuan covers a total area of 7,908 hectares (19,540 acres) comprising fifteen barangays as per the Municipal Comprehensive Development Plan for 1983–1992. However, a certification of the land area of Batuan, issued by ARED for operations, DENR Regional Office Region No. 7 Cebu City on 26 November 2001 at the instance of the LGU in connection with its Comprehensive Land Use Plan (CLUP) preparation work, showed a land area of only 4,878 hectares (12,050 acres), but that included only eleven barangays and excluded four—Quirino, Aloja, Behind the Clouds and Garcia.

Located within the province's tourist area, Batuan is the gateway to the Chocolate Hills, being only about 3 kilometres (1.9 mi) from the Chocolate Hills complex in Carmen.

Batuan celebrates its fiesta on July 25, to honor the town patron Saint James.

== History ==
This interior town used to be a barrio of Bilar during the Spanish regime and was called Lindugon. During the early years of the American regime, this barrio was made into a municipality by Act No. 968 dated Oct 31, 1903 that provided the following: “The Municipality of Batuan shall consist of the territory of the barrio of Batuan in the present Municipality of Bilar, with the seat of the municipal government at the present barrio of Batuan.” (Acts of the Philippine Commission, Vol. XIV. Washington: Government Printing Office, 1904).

Batuan became a separate municipality through the efforts of local leaders such as Manuel Decasa, Alejandro Barril, and Victor Tiongson, who were even imprisoned for strongly advocating its separation from its mother town, Bilar. Despite this, they continued to pursue their goal after their release. The Municipality of Batuan was eventually established, initially comprising five barangays, namely Lindugon, Cambacay, Rosariohan, Janlud, and Cantigdas, and has since expanded to a total of fifteen barangays.

The early years of local administration saw its seat at Lindugon, now Poblacion Vieja. In 1911 however, the Municipal Hall, the seat of local government, was transferred to sitio Tinagacan for reasons of accessibility. Eventually, the parish church was also relocated to its present site at the Poblacion.

Batuan got its name from the edible fruit with the same name, which grew frequently in the locality. Today though these trees can hardly be found in the area.

During the Japanese occupation, Batuan was a haven of evacuees from the other parts of Bohol as well as from the provinces of Cebu and Leyte. It was at the Batuan Central School site where the unification of the guerilla forces of Bohol was forged on 29 June 1942, paving the way for the creation of the Bohol Area Command (BAC) under the command of Major Ismael Ingeniero, whose election was hotly contested by rival factions. The command had its headquarters in Brgy Behind the Clouds. Major Ingeniero and his force played a pivotal role in the Battle of the Visayas and liberation of Bohol.

== Geography ==
Batuan is 52 kilometres (32 mi) from Tagbilaran, and is located in the interior part of the island. It is accessible via the Tagbilaran–Loay–Carmen national road or the Tagbilaran–Balilihan–Batuan provincial road. It marches with Sagbayan to the north, with Bilar to the south, with Carmen and Valencia to the east, and with Catigbian and Balilihan to the west.

=== Climate ===
Like most of the municipalities of the province, the climate in Batuan falls within Coronas climate type IV, characterized by not very pronounced maximum rainfall with a short dry season from one to three months and a wet season of nine to ten months. The dry season starts in February and lasts up to April sometimes extending to the middle of May. The heaviest rainfalls are from June to August. It is usually cold during the night in the area. Batuan is generally out of the typhoon belt area and very seldom experiences typhoons.

=== Hydrogeology ===
The entire area of Batuan is covered by two sedimentary rock formations: Maribojoc Limestone, occupying 78.74 km^{2} (30.40 sq mi), 99.6% of its total land area, and Carmen formation, occupying 0.34 km^{2} (0.13 sq mi), 0.4%.

Dominant slope of the area is 30 – 50% covering an estimated area of 29 km^{2} (11.2 sq mi), 37.1% of its total land area, with 21 km^{2} (8.1 sq mi), 26.9% in the 0 - 3% category (more or less level).

Batuan is entirely within the Loboc River Basin. Two tributaries of Loboc river – the Pagbathan and the Bayog – flow east–west into the main river course.

=== Agriculture ===
Basically, Batuan is an agricultural town as more than half of its total land area is devoted to agriculture, about 4,952 ha (12,240 acres) or 63%. This is the main source of livelihood in the locality where a great portion of its income is derived from crop production, livestock and poultry raising. Rice and corn are the principal crops grown in the area. Coconut, fruits root crops and leafy vegetables come next. Despite the absence of effective irrigation facilities, 1,794 ha (4,430 acres) (36.2% of agricultural land) are devoted to rice production, with an average production of 60 cavans per hectare. (Note: Cavan is a fairly imprecise, variable measure. It means "sack" or "box" in Visayan dialects, and was originally a measure of volume not weight. For rice nowadays though it is about 50 ± 5 kilograms (110 ± 11 lb), so 60 cavans per hectare is about 3,000 ± 300 kg/ha (2,680 ± 270 lb/acre), giving a total annual yield around 5,380 metric tons (5,300 long tons).) 1,313 ha (3,240 acres) (26.5%) are devoted to corn production. Coffee and cacao are among the industrial crops grown in the locality. Just launched by the LGU is the Fish Culture Farming program designed to encourage smallholders to develop small backyard fishponds to address the scarce supply and high costs of fish in the area.

=== Climate ===
Climate data for Batuan, Bohol
Month	Jan	Feb	Mar	Apr	May	Jun	Jul	Aug	Sep	Oct	Nov	Dec	Year
Mean daily maximum °C (°F)	26 (79)	27 (81)	28 (82)	29 (84)	29 (84)	28 (82)	28 (82)	28 (82)	28 (82)	27 (81)	27 (81)	27 (81)	28 (82)
Mean daily minimum °C (°F)	21 (70)	20 (68)	21 (70)	21 (70)	22 (72)	23 (73)	22 (72)	22 (72)	22 (72)	22 (72)	21 (70)	21 (70)	22 (71)
Average precipitation mm (inches)	102 (4.0)	85 (3.3)	91 (3.6)	75 (3.0)	110 (4.3)	141 (5.6)	121 (4.8)	107 (4.2)	111 (4.4)	144 (5.7)	169 (6.7)	139 (5.5)	1,395 (55.1)
Average rainy days	18.6	14.8	16.5	16.7	23.9	26.4	25.6	24.1	24.4	26.3	23.7	20.5	261.5
Source: Meteoblue

=== Barangays ===
Batuan is politically subdivided into 15 barangays. Each barangay consists of puroks and some have sitios.

PSGC	Barangay	Population			±% p.a.		Area		PD 2024	
		2024		2010			ha	acre	/km^{2}	/sq mi
071207001	Aloja	2.9%	424	437	▾	−0.21%	385	951	110	290
071207016	Behind the Clouds (San Jose)	1.6%	234	256	▾	−0.62%	975	2,409	24	62
071207002	Cabacnitan	4.9%	701	596	▴	1.14%	637	1,574	110	290
071207003	Cambacay	4.7%	673	585	▴	0.98%	479	1,184	140	360
071207004	Cantigdas	5.4%	786	735	▴	0.47%	380	939	210	540
071207005	Garcia	3.3%	476	546	▾	−0.95%	580	1,433	82	210
071207006	Janlud	5.4%	780	703	▴	0.73%	589	1,455	130	340
071207008	Poblacion Norte	13.8%	1,988	1,889	▴	0.36%	355	877	560	1,500
071207009	Poblacion Sur	9.1%	1,313	1,353	▾	−0.21%	561	1,386	230	610
071207010	Poblacion Vieja (Lungsodaan)	6.2%	899	894	▴	0.04%	428	1,058	210	540
071207011	Quezon	4.2%	609	603	▴	0.07%	398	983	150	400
071207012	Quirino	3.3%	480	447	▴	0.50%	340	840	140	370
071207013	Rizal	9.0%	1,295	1,277	▴	0.10%	558	1,379	230	600
071207014	Rosariohan	6.4%	929	939	▾	−0.07%	699	1,727	130	340
071207017	Santa Cruz	8.2%	1,180	1,171	▴	0.05%	544	1,344	220	560
	Total		14,423	12,431	▴	1.04%	7,908	19,541	180	14

== Demographics ==
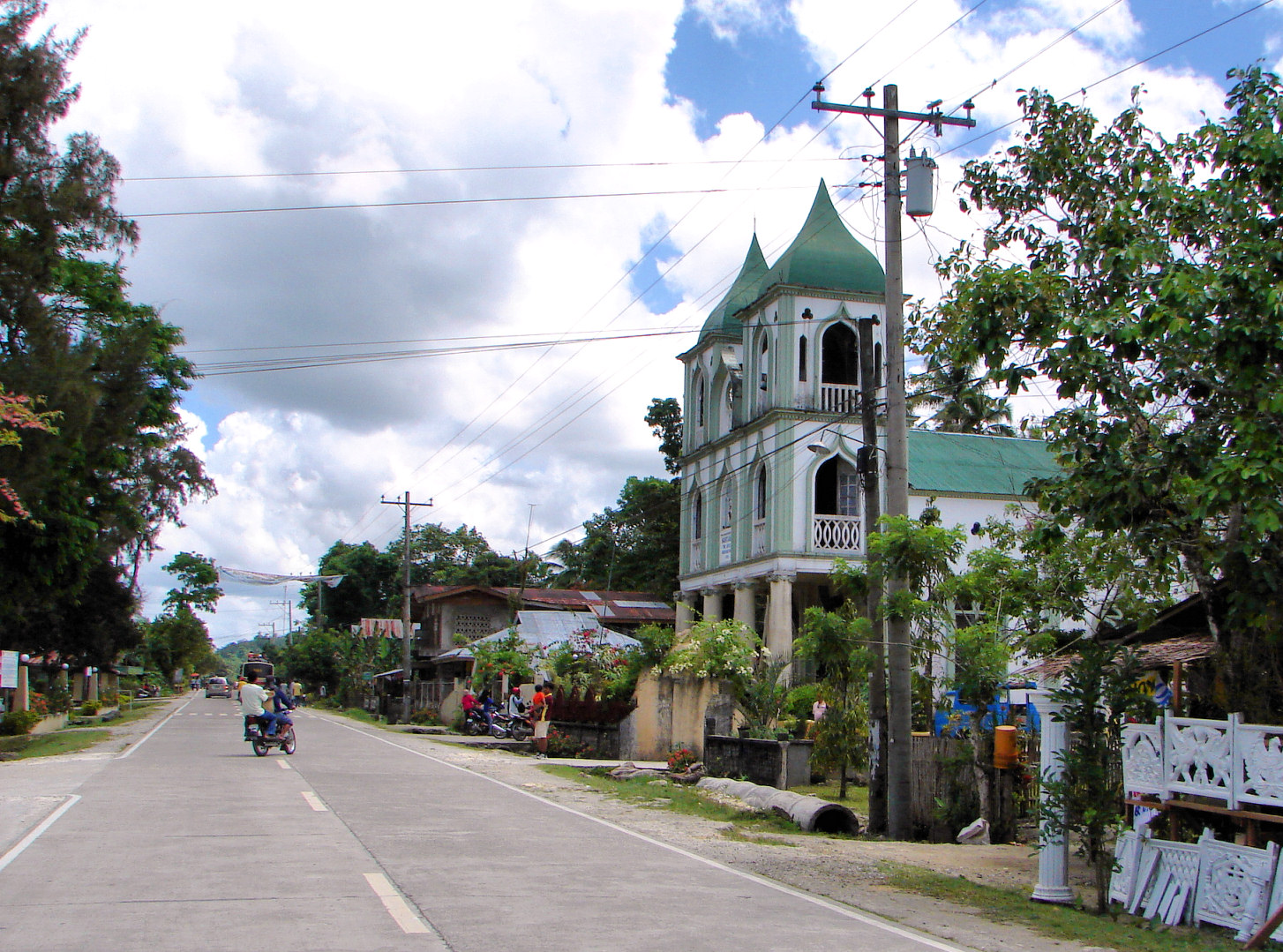
Main street

Population census of Batuan
Year	Pop.	±% p.a.
1903	1,817	—
1918	3,610	+4.68%
1939	5,982	+2.43%
1948	7,503	+2.55%
1960	7,758	+0.28%
1970	8,712	+1.17%
1975	9,940	+2.68%
1980	9,833	−0.22%
1990	11,438	+1.52%
1995	11,898	+0.74%
2000	11,835	−0.11%
2007	12,137	+0.35%
2010	12,431	+0.87%
2015	12,767	+0.51%
2020	13,845	+1.72%
2024	14,423	+0.99%
Source: Philippine Statistics Authority

Batuan's working age or economically active population age 15–64, comprises 58% of its total population, while its dependent population, aged 0–14 and 65 years and above, comprises 42%.

== Economy ==
Poverty incidence of Batuan

Source: Philippine Statistics Authority

=== Transport ===
Batuan has a total road network of about 92.1 kilometres (57.2 mi) of which 65.5 kilometres (40.7 mi) are barangay roads, 15.8 kilometres (9.8 mi) are provincial roads, 3.2 kilometres (2.0 mi) national and 10.8 kilometres (6.7 mi) municipal roads. While the entire national road network is of either concrete or asphalt surface, only about 2.3 kilometres (1.4 mi) (21%) of its municipal roads, and about 2.5 kilometres (1.6 mi) (4%) of its barangay roads are concrete with the larger portion still earth and / or gravel. 98% of its provincial roads are gravel. Bus companies present in Batuan such as Southern Star Bus Transit, Clynn Trans, Chatto Trans, and other companies, provide the town mass transportation within its boundaries and to other towns and city. Two major routes are present in Batuan, namely: Loay Interior Road and Balilihan-Hanopol-Batuan Road, which connects Batuan to adjacent towns and the provincial capital Tagbilaran.

=== Trade, commerce and industry ===
Commercial and trading transactions in Batuan gravitate to the urban area, considered the town's Central Business District. However, commercial and trading activities in the area are brisk. Commercial activities in Batuan pass through a network of various commercial establishments. Sari-sari stores are the most common. Other are bakeries, eateries, drugstores, farm and poultry stores, and hardware stores. Service provider in the area include iron works, welding shops, repair shops, furniture factories & communication facilities. Among the ubiquitous industries of Batuan are the rice and corn mills located mainly in the Poblacion areas. Other than those, industrial activities are minimal.

Although Batuan is only about 3 km (1.9 mi) from the Chocolate Hills complex, tourism activities in the municipality are very few. There are no facilities and establishments that cater to the needs and wants of the industry. Batuan also has the Camanayon Mountain.

== Government ==
=== Welfare ===
All barangays have their day care centers where services are provided by daycare workers on a regular basis, a program financially supported by the LGU aside from other programs like supplemental feeding, emergency assistance, and burial assistance.

The Municipal Health Office (MHO) is staffed by one doctor, five midwives, a nurse, a medical (laboratory) technologist, a sanitary inspector, and a dentist who reports only twice a week due to budget constraints. A team of Barangay Health Workers has been organized in all barangays to help facilitate and speed up the delivery of basic health services even in the remote areas. There are only three Barangay Health stations in the whole area. Several ambulance are on stand-by as well as MDRRMO trucks for emergency and general use. Heavy and farm equipment are also now available in the municipality and may be lent by private constituents for certain agricultural and other purposes.

==== Protective services ====
For the maintenance of peace and order in the area, the LGU has a local PNP station headed by a police chief with ten (10) junior PNP personnel, equipped with some high-powered firearms and two patrol cars. The local PNP force is assisted in this regard by tanod members of each composite barangay as far as law and order are concerned at barangay level. The LGU also has an existing fire truck and some fire protection equipment. A fire station is currently under construction.

== Education ==
There are eighteen learning institutions in Batuan of which nine are primary schools, six elementary schools, four public and two private high schools, providing secondary education. Batuan Colleges Inc., a privately owned college school offering technical and short courses in a close tie-up with TESDA, has been in operation since mid‑2000s.

== Sources ==
- Coronas, José (1920). The Climate and Weather of the Philippines, 1903 – 1918. Manila Observatory: Bureau of Philippines.
- Faustino, D. V.; Yumul, G. P. Jr.; de Jesus, J. V.; Dimalanta, C. B.; Aitchison, J. C.; Zhou, M-F.; Tamayo Jr, R. A. & de Leon, M. M. (2003). "Geology of southeast Bohol, central Philippines: accretion and sedimentation in a marginal basin" (online text). Australian Journal of Earth Sciences. 50 (4): 571–583. doi:10.1046/j.1440-0952.2003.01015.x. S2CID 129924054.
