= Balilihan =

Municipality in Bohol, Philippines

- Municipality
- Municipality of Balilihan
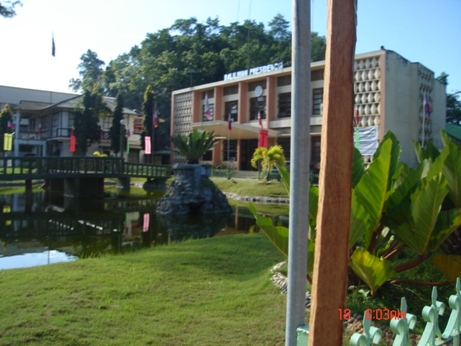
- Balilihan Municipal Hall

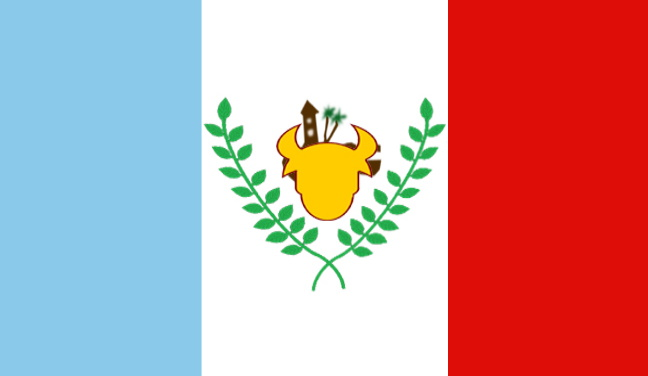
- Flag

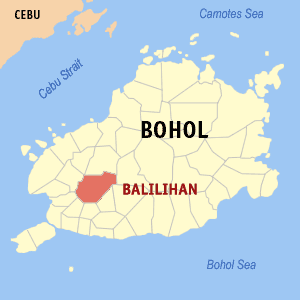
- Map of Bohol with Balilihan highlighted
- Interactive map of Balilihan
- Location within the Philippines
- Coordinates: 9°45′N 123°58′E
- Country: Philippines
- Region: Central Visayas
- Province: Bohol
- District: 1st district
- Founded: 29 September 1828 previously part of Baclayon town.
- Barangays: 31 (see Barangays)

Government
  - Type: Sangguniang Bayan
  - Mayor: Esther Patrisha Veloso Chatto
  - Vice Mayor: Lorenzo Aberia Baliong, Jr.
  - Representative: John Geesnell "Baba" Yap
  - Municipal Council: Members: Maria Puresa Veloso-Chatto; Jill Felix Chatto Reyes; Edgar Suarez Asilo; Abel Eligio Oñes Llorente; Jose Bernard Lungay Lansang; Stephen Parras Racho; Nicolas Jumawan Ale; Angel Mae Paña; NB COMELEC
  - Electorate: 15,251 voters (2025)

Area
  - Total: 127.27 km^{2} (49.14 sq mi)
  - Rank: 4th
- Elevation: 110 m (360 ft)
- Highest elevation: 287 m (942 ft)
- Lowest elevation: 9 m (30 ft)

Population (2024 census)
  - Total: 19,747
  - Density: 155.16/km^{2} (401.86/sq mi)
  - Households: 4,485
- Demonym: Balilinhon

Economy
  - Income class: 3rd municipal income class
  - Poverty incidence: 17.11% (2023)
  - Revenue: ₱ 144.2 million (2024)
  - Assets: ₱ 533.2 million (2024)
  - Expenditure: ₱ 93.61 million (2024)
  - Liabilities: ₱ 87.51 million (2024)

Service Providers
  - Electricity: Bohol 1 Electric Cooperative (BOHECO 1)
  - Water: Balilihan Municipal Waterworks
  - Telecommunications: Smart Communications, Globe Telecom (cellular) PLDT (fixed-line)
- Time zone: UTC+8 (PHT)
- ZIP code: 6342
- PSGC: 071206000
- Native languages: Boholano dialect Cebuano; Tagalog
- Major Religions: Roman Catholicism (majority) and others
- Feast Date: July 16 - Our Lady of Mt. Carmel Parish (Balilihan town proper); January 16 - Santo Niño Parish (Hanopol); September 29 - Sumad (Foundation Day)
- Catholic Diocese: Diocese of Tagbilaran
- Patron Saint: Our Lady of Mt. Carmel (Nuestra Señora del Carmen); Holy Child Jesus (Señor Santo Niño)
- Website: balilihan.gov.ph

Balilihan, officially the Municipality of Balilihan (Cebuano: Lungsod sa Balilihan; Tagalog: Bayan ng Balilihan), is a municipality in the province of Bohol, Philippines. According to the 2024 census, it has a population of 19,747 people.

== History ==
The place is a panorama of verdant hills, rugged mountains and green fields. It is said to have been so named because of the grass "balili" which grew in abundance.

Before the beginning of the 19th century, Balilihan was a barrio of Baclayon and an old settlement. When the Dagohoy revolt was suppressed by the Spaniards, the authorities established a garrison in Datag (one of its barrios) to discourage and stamp out further uprisings on the part of the natives. When Balilihan was separated from Baclayon on the 29th of September 1828, the Spanish government formally established a settlement or pueblo in the sitio "Bay sa Iring" (named so for the network of caves where cats hide) which was about two kilometres (1.2 mi) from the Spanish garrison.

In 1826, Mandog, one of the insurgent leaders during the Dagohoy rebellion, once attempted to burn Balilihan to the ground as an act of revenge—after they burned the churches of Catigbian and Dimiao—when the Spanish militia murdered hundreds of his people in Catagdaan Cave through suffocation, but they were spared when reinforcement were sent from Tagbilaran, Baclayon, and Dauis.

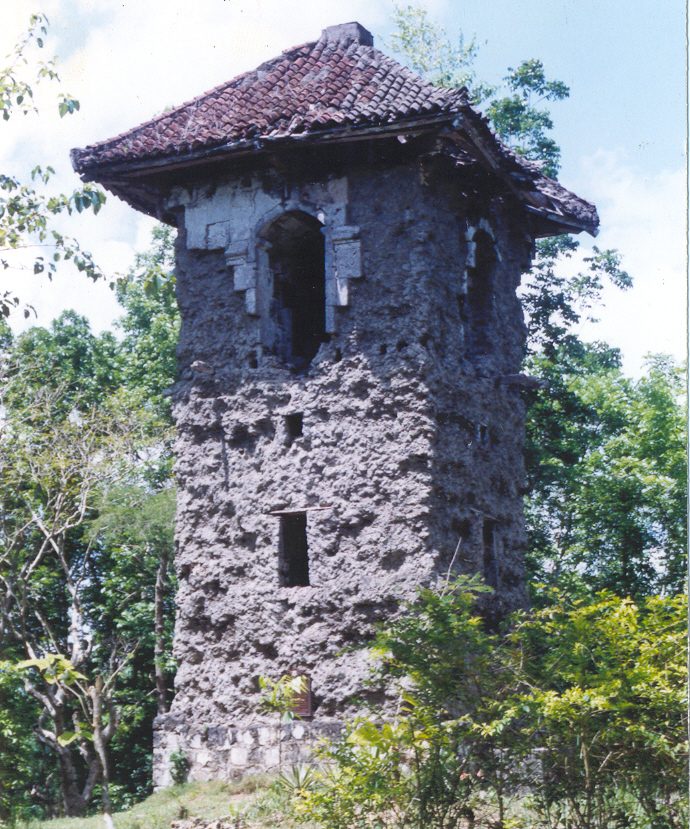
The Spanish Belfry in Del Carmen Norte, Balilihan served as a watch tower during Spanish regime.

Later, due to water scarcity, the seat of government was transferred to its present location, which is well supplied by various natural springs. The site’s elevated terrain also provided a strategic vantage point for monitoring nearby areas. As a result, a Spanish-era belfry—similar in function to coastal watchtowers—was constructed atop the hill. The structure was built from adobe stones sourced from the rock deposits of Baclayon. It was erected in the year 1835. It was inaugurated in 1846 by the gobernadorcillo.

In 1888, Friar Benito Grayoa, who at that time exercised control over local governments, ordered the transfer of the municipio to Cabad, a barrio four kilometres (2.5 mi) west of the poblacion. The padre's plan met vigorous opposition from the people and through the able leadership of Capitan Bartolome Racho, they filed the protest before the Spanish Military Governor Linares who disapproved the proposal causing Friar Grayoa's ire who then plotted for the consequent punishment of the captain by dragging him with the friar's horse through the streets causing his death in jail. Fearing reprisals from the clergy, some of the people migrated to Surigao, Leyte and Misamis. Not long afterwards, Friar Grayoa was transferred to Siquijor. The Spanish era flourished with the construction of Spanish church at the foot of the Spanish watchtower where a large patio became the hall for social affairs and the friar's convent a school for the cartilla, with the municipio across. With the guidance of the local appointed leaders under the control of the Spanish friar, the town slowly progressed peacefully until the outbreak of the revolution in 1898.

On 12 November 1900, American soldiers were known to be coming from Antequera. All officials of the town led by Capitan Antonio Racho came out to meet the soldiers with a brass band, but when the Americans arrived, they gathered all the officials in the municipal hall building and placed them under guard, for the Americans had heard that the town officials had been supporting the insurgents. The supplications of spokesman Segundo Racho not to burn the town was of no avail and the sounds of the welcoming brass band turned into volleys of gunshots. The officials were ordered to move towards Sevilla while the civilians ran for safety to the outskirts of the town. The town was razed to the ground. The Americans burned the church, the convent, the municipal building, the school building for boys and girls as well as private houses. The only structure that was spared was the belfry on the top of the hill.

By 1904, there was a move to fuse Balilihan with Antequera in order to meet the requirements of a municipality under the American regime. The people objected to the plan, so the following year the Philippine Commission finally ruled in its Act. No. 350 abolishing the municipality of Catigbian and instead annexing it to Balilihan as one of its barrios.

During World War II, the town residents went into hiding in their mountain hideouts for fear of the Japanese. Balilihan was a haven of refugees from other places who lived a life of privation in the mountains. Many innocent civilians were either tortured or put into death by the enemies on mere suspicions of guerilla activities. Ex-mayor Patricio Ibarra was put up by the people as war time mayor to defend them from their enemies.

The Japanese atrocities gave rise to the organizations of the guerrillas into full combat force under the supreme command of Mayor Ismael Ingeniero. The people helped the guerilla movement by feeding the troops in the front lines as well as those in the headquarters in Behind the Clouds, in Maitum which was the famous concentration camp of the war. Enemy collaborators were tried here and those found guilty of high crimes were liquidated. Those with slight offenses were imprisoned for the duration of the war. Another concentration camp was at Hanopol where prisoners were kept.

In 1948, Balilihan suffered a great loss of territory when the biggest barrio, Catigbian, was given its town charter in spite of the strong representation against the move by town mayor Balbino Chatto and Gerardo Racho who personally went to Malacañang to see President Elpidio Quirino.

== Geography ==
Balilihan is a landlocked town located 22 kilometres (14 mi) northeast of Tagbilaran through Cortes town (via CPG North Avenue), or 20 kilometres (12 mi) through the town of Corella (via JA Clarin Street). The inland municipality has a land area of 127.27 km^{2} (49.14 sq. mi).

=== Barangays ===
Balilihan is politically subdivided into 31 barangays. Each barangay consists of puroks and some have sitios.

PSGC	Barangay	Population			±% p.a.	
		2024		2010		
071206001	Baucan Norte	3.4%	666	688	▾	−0.23%
071206002	Baucan Sur	4.0%	799	852	▾	−0.45%
071206003	Boctol	6.7%	1,322	1,094	▴	1.33%
071206004	Boyog Norte	1.1%	227	212	▴	0.48%
071206005	Boyog Proper	1.4%	281	199	▴	2.43%
071206006	Boyog Sur	1.8%	348	329	▴	0.39%
071206007	Cabad	3.4%	677	570	▴	1.20%
071206008	Candasig	3.1%	609	591	▴	0.21%
071206009	Cantalid	2.0%	400	387	▴	0.23%
071206010	Cantomimbo	2.7%	539	537	▴	0.03%
071206011	Cogon	3.9%	774	835	▾	−0.53%
071206012	Datag Norte	3.1%	604	540	▴	0.78%
071206013	Datag Sur	2.5%	498	414	▴	1.29%
071206014	Del Carmen Este (DCE) (Poblacion)	3.4%	669	672	▾	−0.03%
071206015	Del Carmen Norte (DCN) (Poblacion)	3.8%	746	720	▴	0.25%
071206017	Del Carmen Sur (DCS) (Poblacion)	3.1%	615	600	▴	0.17%
071206016	Del Carmen Weste (DCW) (Poblacion)	4.2%	827	865	▾	−0.31%
071206018	Del Rosario	1.2%	230	260	▾	−0.85%
071206019	Dorol	3.8%	746	751	▾	−0.05%
071206020	Haguilanan Grande	3.5%	686	836	▾	−1.37%
071206021	Hanopol Este	1.7%	345	337	▴	0.16%
071206022	Hanopol Norte	1.9%	384	349	▴	0.67%
071206023	Hanopol Weste	1.2%	245	272	▾	−0.72%
071206024	Magsija	3.1%	611	477	▴	1.74%
071206025	Maslog	2.7%	524	428	▴	1.42%
071206026	Sagasa	3.1%	613	512	▴	1.26%
071206027	Sal‑ing	3.4%	672	697	▾	−0.25%
071206028	San Isidro	2.3%	455	458	▾	−0.05%
071206029	San Roque	2.8%	546	519	▴	0.35%
071206030	Santo Niño	2.7%	532	494	▴	0.52%
071206031	Tagustusan	3.6%	713	652	▴	0.62%
	Total		19,747	17,147	▴	0.99%

=== Climate ===
Climate data for Balilihan, Bohol
Month	Jan	Feb	Mar	Apr	May	Jun	Jul	Aug	Sep	Oct	Nov	Dec	Year
Mean daily maximum °C (°F)	28 (82)	28 (82)	29 (84)	31 (88)	31 (88)	30 (86)	29 (84)	29 (84)	29 (84)	29 (84)	28 (82)	28 (82)	29 (84)
Mean daily minimum °C (°F)	22 (72)	22 (72)	22 (72)	23 (73)	24 (75)	24 (75)	24 (75)	24 (75)	24 (75)	23 (73)	23 (73)	22 (72)	23 (74)
Average precipitation mm (inches)	102 (4.0)	85 (3.3)	91 (3.6)	75 (3.0)	110 (4.3)	141 (5.6)	121 (4.8)	107 (4.2)	111 (4.4)	144 (5.7)	169 (6.7)	139 (5.5)	1,395 (55.1)
Average rainy days	18.6	14.8	16.5	16.7	23.9	26.4	25.6	24.1	24.4	26.3	23.7	20.5	261.5
Source: Meteoblue

== Demographics ==
Population census of Balilihan
Year	Pop.	±% p.a.
1903	6,590	—
1918	9,973	+2.80%
1939	18,991	+3.11%
1948	23,937	+2.61%
1960	11,161	−6.16%
1970	14,533	+2.67%
1975	13,912	−0.87%
1980	13,925	+0.02%
1990	14,850	+0.65%
1995	14,400	−0.57%
2000	16,837	+3.41%
2007	17,131	+0.24%
2010	17,147	+0.03%
2015	17,903	+0.83%
2020	18,694	+0.91%
2024	19,747	+1.32%
Source: Philippine Statistics Authority

- Number of households: 3,101
- Average household size: 6.4

== Economy ==
Poverty incidence of Balilihan

Source: Philippine Statistics Authority

== Culture ==
=== Town Festival ===
The municipality of Balilihan holds its annual town fiesta (town proper) every July 16 in honor of Our Lady of Mount Carmel. Barrios or barangays around Hanopol area - (a parish composed of 10 barrios) celebrate their annual town fiesta every January 16 in honor of Santo Niño. Another event takes place every last week of the month of September to celebrate the creation of Balilihan as a separate municipality on September 29, 1828.

== Education ==
Elementary and primary schools
  - Balilihan Central Elementary School
  - Baucan Elementary School
  - Boctol Elementary School
  - Boyog Elementary School
  - Cabad-Candasig Elementary School
  - Cantalid Primary School
  - Cantomimbo Primary School
  - Cogon-Tagustusan School
  - Datag Elementary School
  - Dorol Elementary School
  - Haguilanan Grande Elementary School
  - Hanopol Elementary School
  - Magsija-Maslog Elementary School
  - Sagasa Elementary School
  - Sal-ing Elementary School
  - San Isidro Primary School
  - San Roque Integrated School (elementary and high school)
Secondary schools
  - Carmel Academy (CA)
  - Congressman Pablo Malasarte National High School (CPMNHS)
  - Hanopol National High School (HNHS)
  - San Roque Integrated School (SRIS)
Tertiary schools
  - Bohol Island State University (BISU) – Balilihan Campus

== Gallery ==
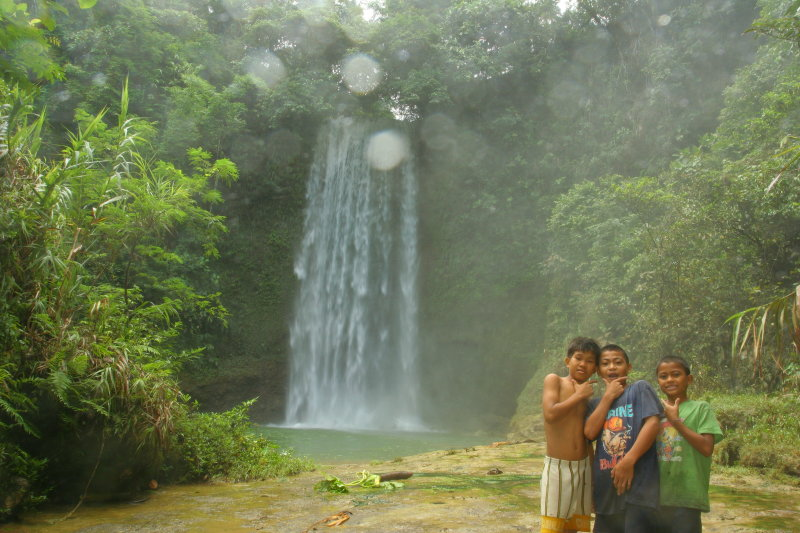
Camugao Falls located in northwestern Balilihan, near the Abatan River

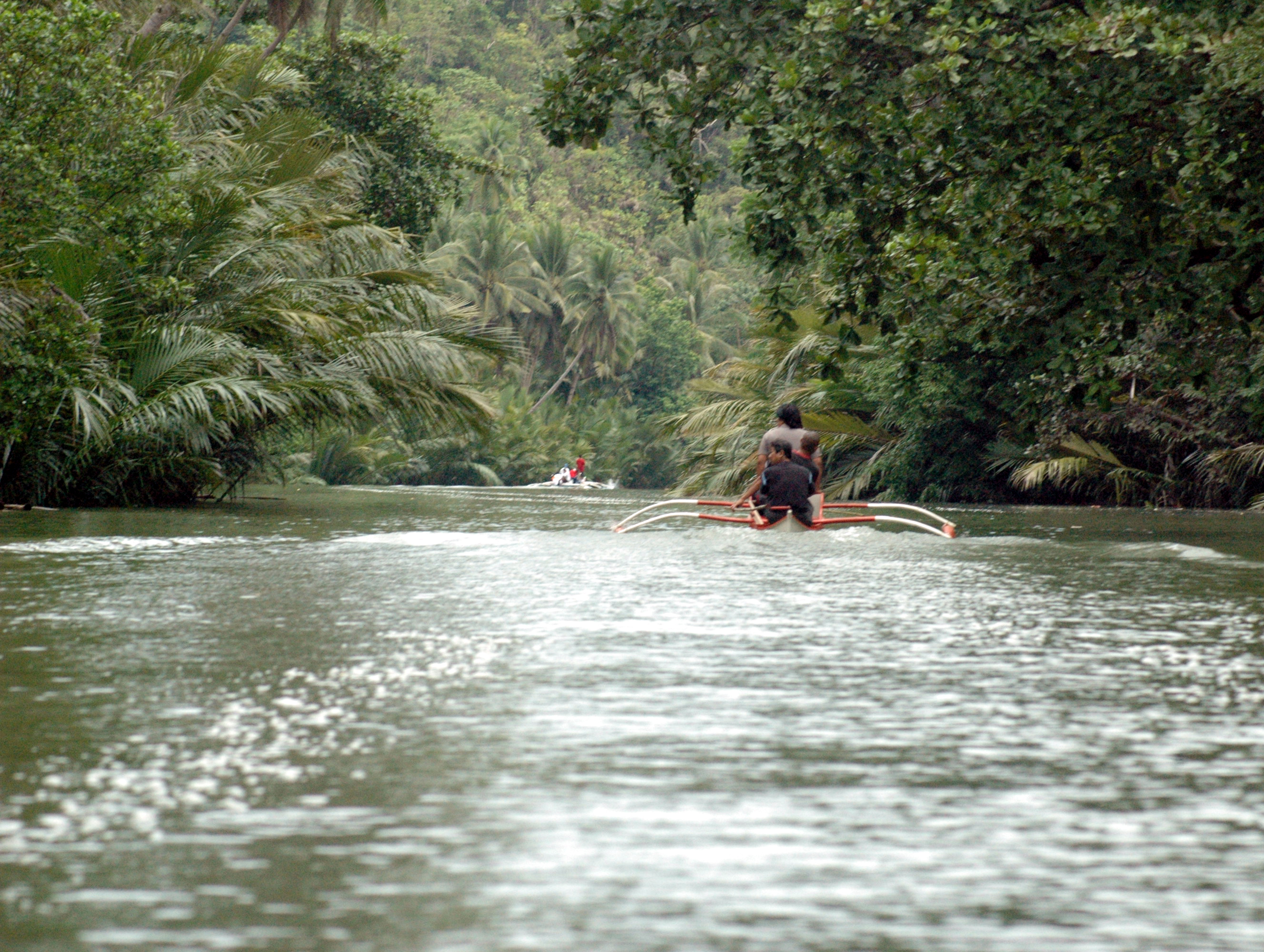
Abatan River

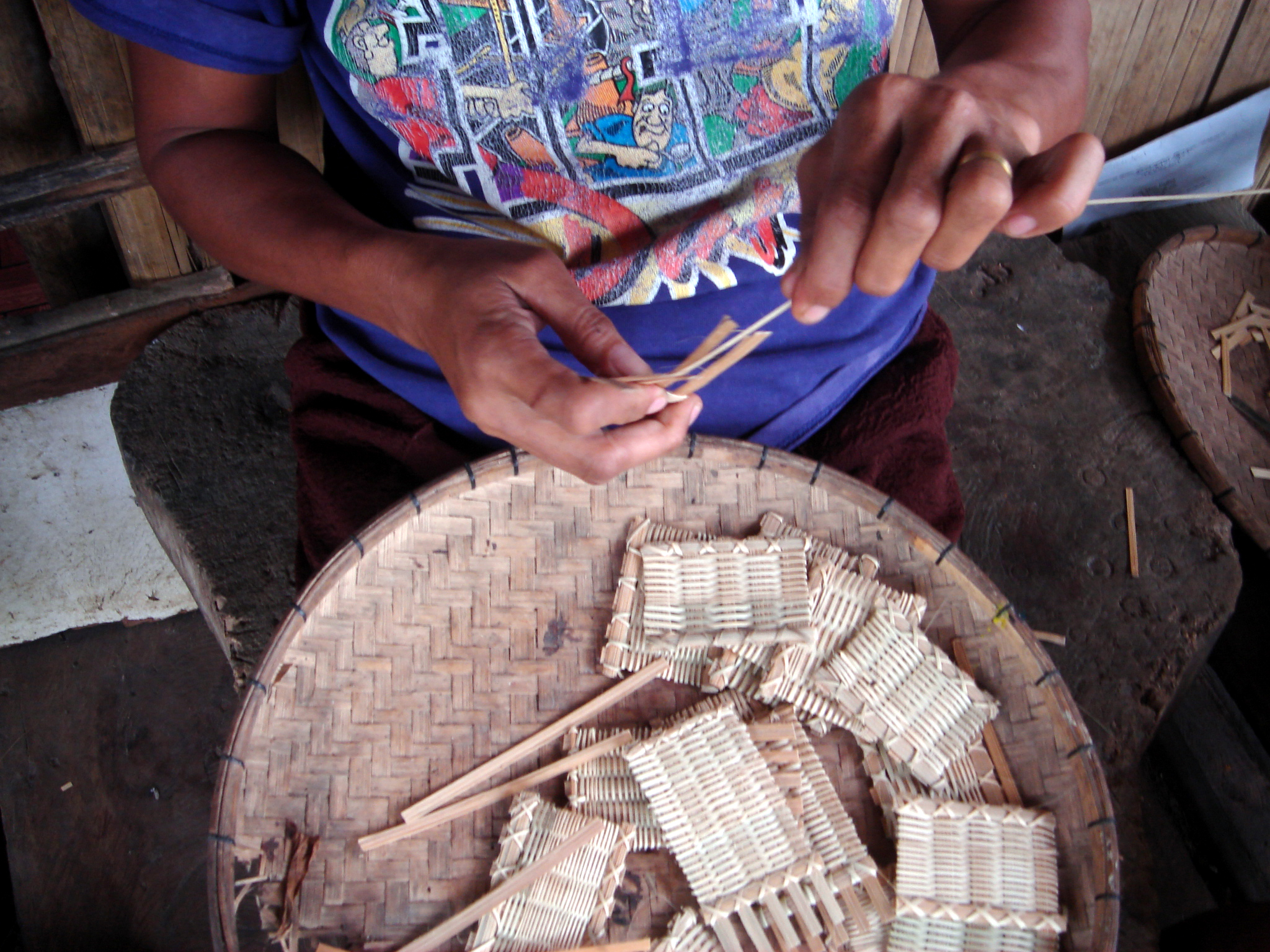
Making of baskets

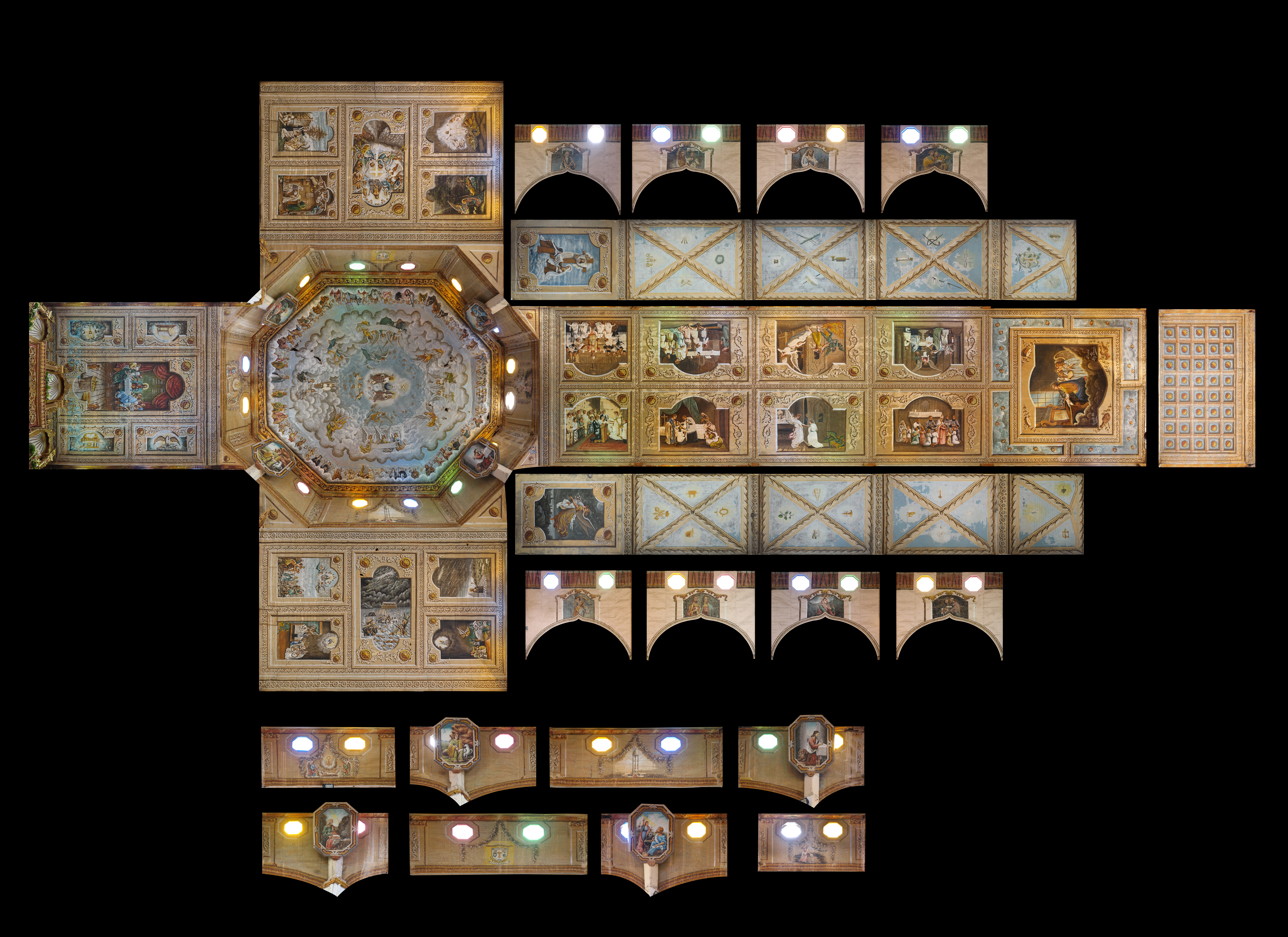
Ceiling paintings of Balilihan Roman Catholic Church

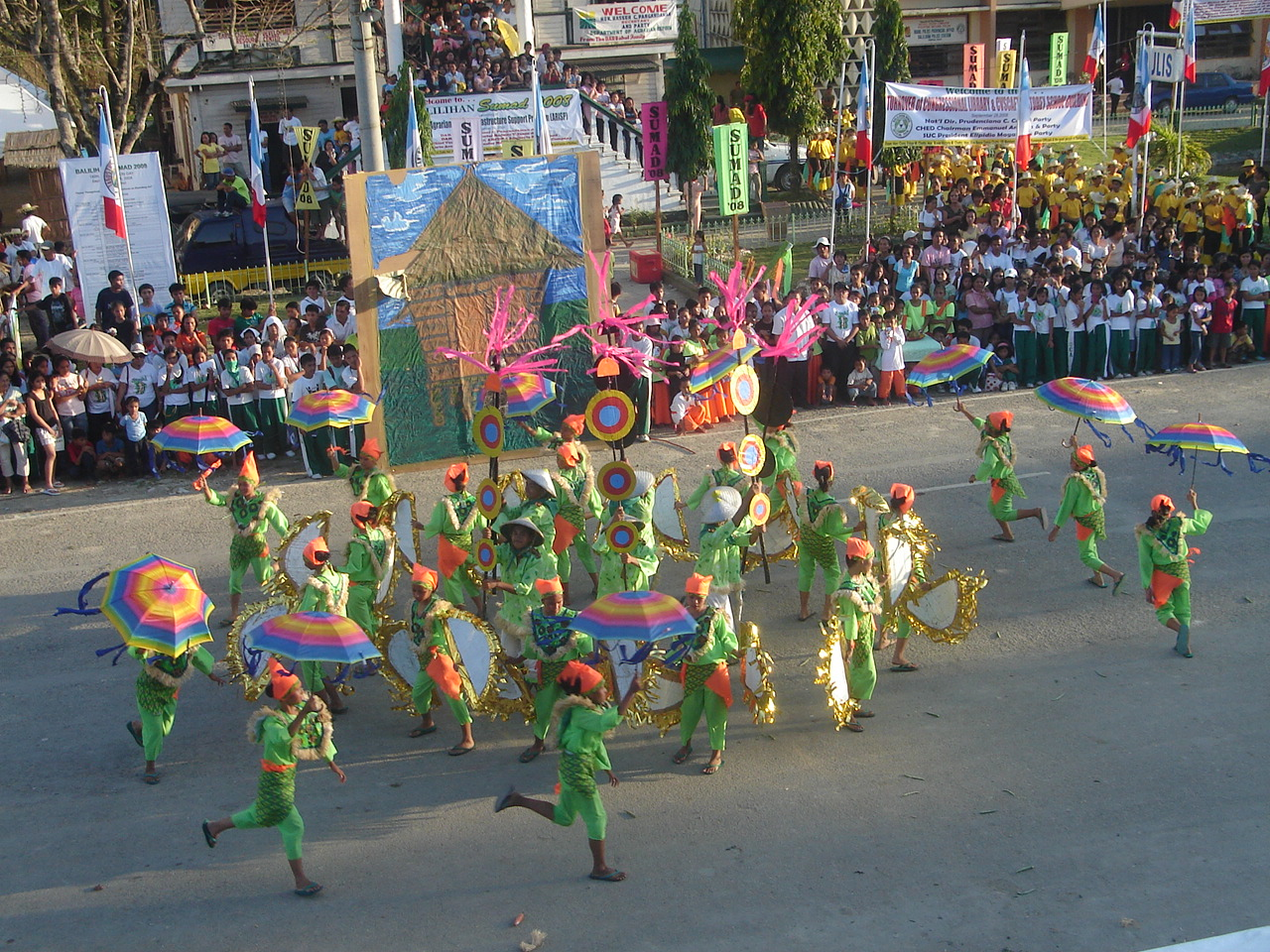
Festival in Balilihan, held every last week of September
