= Bohol's at-large congressional district =

Legislative district of the Philippines

Bohol's at-large congressional district was the provincewide electoral district used to elect members of Philippine national legislatures in Bohol before 1987.

Bohol first elected its representatives at-large during the 1943 Philippine legislative election for a seat in the National Assembly of the Second Philippine Republic. Before 1943, the province was represented in the national legislatures through its first, second and third districts. The province was also earlier represented in the Malolos Congress of the First Philippine Republic in 1898 by appointed delegates from Luzon.

The three districts were restored in Bohol ahead of the 1941 Philippine House of Representatives elections whose elected representatives only began to serve following the dissolution of the Second Republic and the restoration of the Philippine Commonwealth in 1945. An at-large district would not be used in the province again until the 1984 Philippine parliamentary election for three seats in the Batasang Pambansa. It became obsolete following the 1987 reapportionment under a new constitution that restored Bohol's three congressional districts.

== Representation history ==
#	Term of office		National Assembly	Seat A				Seat B				Seat C			
#	Start	End	National Assembly	Image	Member	Party	Electoral history	Image	Member	Party	Electoral history	Image	Member	Party	Electoral history
=== Bohol's at-large district for the Malolos Congress ===
District created June 18, 1898.
–	September 15, 1898	March 23, 1901	1st		Tranquilino Arroyo	Independent	Appointed.		Pedro Tongio Liongson	Independent	Appointed.		Anastasio Pinson	Independent	Appointed.
#	Term of office		National Assembly	Seat A				Seat B				Seats eliminated			
#	Start	End	National Assembly	Image	Member	Party	Electoral history	Image	Member	Party	Electoral history	Seats eliminated			
=== Bohol's at-large district for the National Assembly (Second Philippine Republic) ===												Seats eliminated			
District re-created September 7, 1943.												Seats eliminated			
–	September 25, 1943	February 2, 1944	1st		Vicente P. Bullecer	KALIBAPI	Elected in 1943.		Agapito Hontanosas	KALIBAPI	Appointed as an ex officio member.	Seats eliminated			
District dissolved into Bohol's 1st, 2nd and 3rd districts.												Seats eliminated			
#	Term of office		Batasang Pambansa	Seat A				Seat B				Seat C			
#	Start	End	Batasang Pambansa	Image	Member	Party	Electoral history	Image	Member	Party	Electoral history	Image	Member	Party	Electoral history
=== Bohol's at-large district for the Regular Batasang Pambansa ===
District re-created February 1, 1984.
–	July 23, 1984	March 25, 1986	2nd		Eladio I. Chatto	KBL	Elected in 1984.		Ramon M. Lapez	KBL	Elected in 1984.		David B. Tirol	KBL	Elected in 1984.
District dissolved into Bohol's 1st, 2nd and 3rd districts.

== See also ==
- Legislative districts of Bohol
