= Bohol's 1st congressional district =

House of Representatives of the Philippines legislative district

- Constituency for the House of Representatives of the Philippines
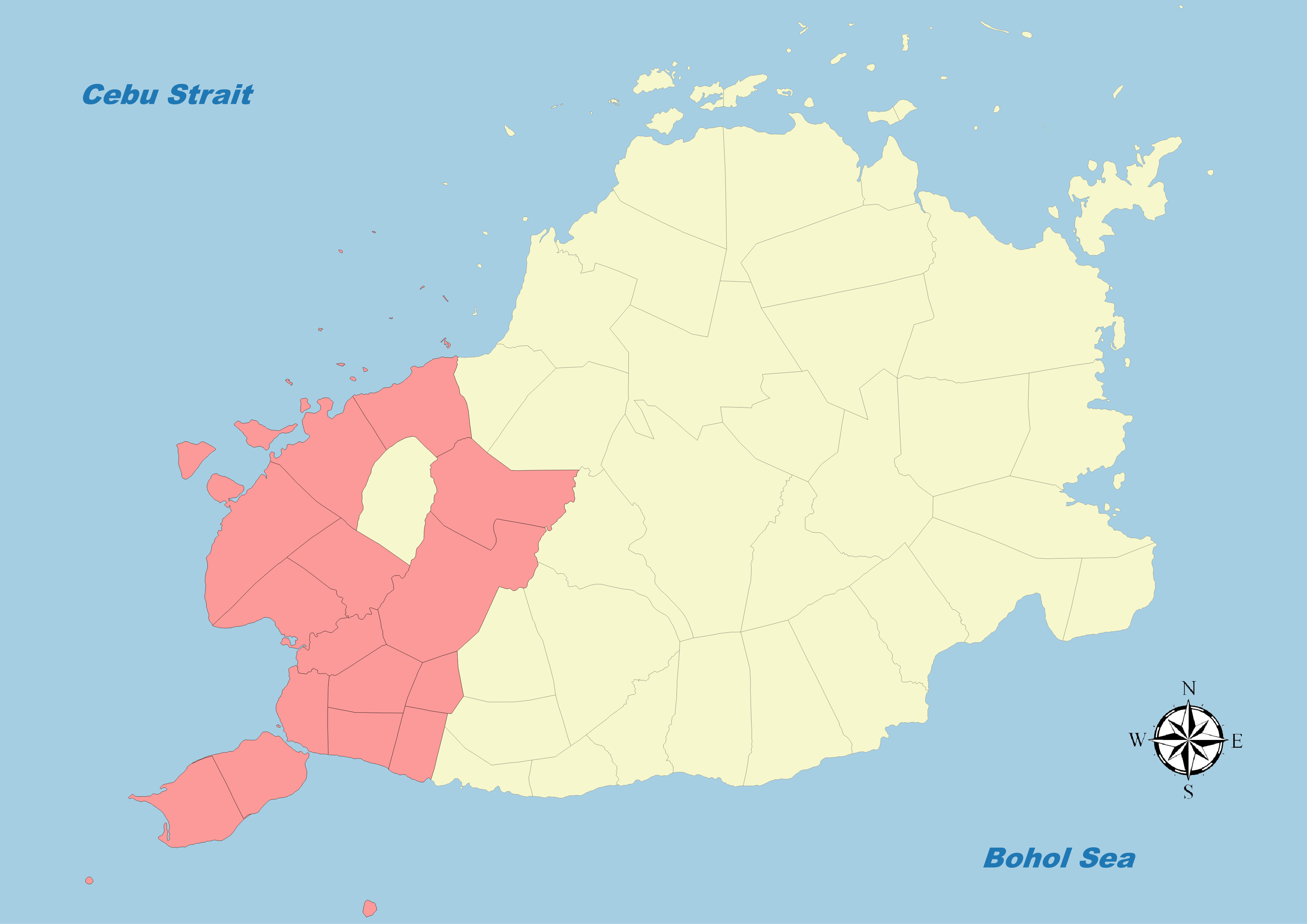
- Boundary of Bohol's 1st congressional district in Bohol

- Location of Bohol within the Philippines
- Province: Bohol
- Region: Central Visayas
- Population: 443,038 (2015)
- Electorate: 268,381 (2016)
- Major settlements: 15 LGUs: Cities; Tagbilaran; Municipalities; Alburquerque; Antequera; Baclayon; Balilihan; Calape; Catigbian; Corella; Cortes; Dauis; Loon; Maribojoc; Panglao; Sikatuna; Tubigon
- Area: 1,002.68 km^{2}

Current constituency
- Created: 1907
- Representative: Baba Yap
- Congressional bloc: Majority

Bohol's 1st congressional district is one of the three congressional districts of the Philippines in the province of Bohol. It has been represented in the House of Representatives of the Philippines since 1916 and earlier in the Philippine Assembly from 1907 to 1916. The district consists of the provincial capital city of Tagbilaran and adjacent municipalities of Alburquerque, Antequera, Baclayon, Balilihan, Calape, Catigbian, Corella, Cortes, Dauis, Loon, Maribojoc, Panglao, Sikatuna and Tubigon. It is currently represented in the 20th Congress by John Geesnell “Baba” Yap of the National Unity Party (NUP).

== Representation history ==
#	Image	Member	Term of office		Legislature	Party	Electoral history	Constituent LGUs
#	Image	Member	Start	End	Legislature	Party	Electoral history	Constituent LGUs
=== Bohol's 1st district for the Philippine Assembly ===
District created January 9, 1907.
1		Candelario Borja	October 16, 1907	October 16, 1916	1st	Nacionalista	Elected in 1907.	1907–1916; Antequera, Baclayon, Balilihan, Calape, Corella, Cortes, Dauis, Loon, Maribojoc, Panglao, Tagbilaran
1		Candelario Borja	October 16, 1907	October 16, 1916	2nd	Nacionalista	Re-elected in 1909.	1907–1916; Antequera, Baclayon, Balilihan, Calape, Corella, Cortes, Dauis, Loon, Maribojoc, Panglao, Tagbilaran
1		Candelario Borja	October 16, 1907	October 16, 1916	3rd	Nacionalista	Re-elected in 1912.	1907–1916; Antequera, Baclayon, Balilihan, Calape, Corella, Cortes, Dauis, Loon, Maribojoc, Panglao, Tagbilaran
=== Bohol's 1st district for the House of Representatives of the Philippine Islands ===
2		Celestino Gallares	October 16, 1916	June 6, 1922	4th	Nacionalista	Elected in 1916.	1916–1935; Antequera, Baclayon, Balilihan, Calape, Corella, Cortes, Dauis, Loon, Maribojoc, Panglao, Tagbilaran
2		Celestino Gallares	October 16, 1916	June 6, 1922	5th	Nacionalista	Re-elected in 1919.	1916–1935; Antequera, Baclayon, Balilihan, Calape, Corella, Cortes, Dauis, Loon, Maribojoc, Panglao, Tagbilaran
3		Fermín Torralba	June 6, 1922	June 5, 1928	6th	Nacionalista; Colectivista	Elected in 1922.	1916–1935; Antequera, Baclayon, Balilihan, Calape, Corella, Cortes, Dauis, Loon, Maribojoc, Panglao, Tagbilaran
3		Fermín Torralba	June 6, 1922	June 5, 1928	7th	Nacionalista; Consolidado	Re-elected in 1925.	1916–1935; Antequera, Baclayon, Balilihan, Calape, Corella, Cortes, Dauis, Loon, Maribojoc, Panglao, Tagbilaran
4		José Concón	June 5, 1928	June 5, 1934	8th	Independent	Elected in 1928.	1916–1935; Antequera, Baclayon, Balilihan, Calape, Corella, Cortes, Dauis, Loon, Maribojoc, Panglao, Tagbilaran
4		José Concón	June 5, 1928	June 5, 1934	9th	Independent	Re-elected in 1931.	1916–1935; Antequera, Baclayon, Balilihan, Calape, Corella, Cortes, Dauis, Loon, Maribojoc, Panglao, Tagbilaran
5		Bernardo Josol	June 5, 1934	September 16, 1935	10th	Nacionalista; Democrático	Elected in 1934.	1916–1935; Antequera, Baclayon, Balilihan, Calape, Corella, Cortes, Dauis, Loon, Maribojoc, Panglao, Tagbilaran
#	Image	Member	Term of office		National Assembly	Party	Electoral history	Constituent LGUs
#	Image	Member	Start	End	National Assembly	Party	Electoral history	Constituent LGUs
=== Bohol's 1st district for the National Assembly (Commonwealth of the Philippines) ===
6		Juan Torralba	September 16, 1935	December 30, 1938	1st	Nacionalista; Democrático	Elected in 1935.	1935–1941; Antequera, Baclayon, Balilihan, Calape, Corella, Cortes, Dauis, Loon, Maribojoc, Panglao, Tagbilaran
7		Genaro Visarra	December 30, 1938	December 30, 1941	2nd	Nacionalista	Elected in 1938.	1935–1941; Antequera, Baclayon, Balilihan, Calape, Corella, Cortes, Dauis, Loon, Maribojoc, Panglao, Tagbilaran
District dissolved into the two-seat Bohol's at-large district for the National Assembly (Second Philippine Republic).
#	Image	Member	Term of office		Common wealth Congress	Party	Electoral history	Constituent LGUs
#	Image	Member	Start	End	Common wealth Congress	Party	Electoral history	Constituent LGUs
=== Bohol's 1st district for the House of Representatives of the Commonwealth of the Philippines ===
District re-created May 24, 1945.
(7)		Genaro Visarra	June 11, 1945	May 25, 1946	1st	Nacionalista	Re-elected in 1941.	1945–1946; Antequera, Baclayon, Balilihan, Calape, Corella, Cortes, Dauis, Loon, Maribojoc, Panglao, Tagbilaran
#	Image	Member	Term of office		Congress	Party	Electoral history	Constituent LGUs
#	Image	Member	Start	End	Congress	Party	Electoral history	Constituent LGUs
=== Bohol's 1st district for the House of Representatives of the Philippines ===
8		Luís T. Clarín	May 25, 1946	February 25, 1949	1st	Liberal	Elected in 1946. Election annulled by House tribunal after an electoral protest.	1946–1969; Antequera, Baclayon, Balilihan, Calape, Corella, Cortes, Dauis, Loon, Maribojoc, Panglao, Tagbilaran
(7)		Genaro Visarra	March 4, 1949	December 30, 1949	1st	Nacionalista	Declared winner of 1946 elections.	1946–1969; Antequera, Baclayon, Balilihan, Calape, Corella, Cortes, Dauis, Loon, Maribojoc, Panglao, Tagbilaran
(8)		Luís T. Clarín	December 30, 1949	December 30, 1953	2nd	Liberal	Elected in 1949.	1946–1969; Antequera, Baclayon, Balilihan, Calape, Corella, Cortes, Dauis, Loon, Maribojoc, Panglao, Tagbilaran
9		Natalio P. Castillo	December 30, 1953	January 25, 1960	3rd	Nacionalista	Elected in 1953.	1946–1969; Antequera, Baclayon, Balilihan, Calape, Corella, Cortes, Dauis, Loon, Maribojoc, Panglao, Tagbilaran
9		Natalio P. Castillo	December 30, 1953	January 25, 1960	4th	Nacionalista	Re-elected in 1957. Resigned on appointment as Executive Secretary.	1946–1969; Antequera, Baclayon, Balilihan, Calape, Corella, Cortes, Dauis, Loon, Maribojoc, Panglao, Tagbilaran
9		Natalio P. Castillo	September 5, 1961	September 23, 1972	4th	Nacionalista	Returned to finish term.	1946–1969; Antequera, Baclayon, Balilihan, Calape, Corella, Cortes, Dauis, Loon, Maribojoc, Panglao, Tagbilaran
9		Natalio P. Castillo	September 5, 1961	September 23, 1972	5th	Nacionalista	Re-elected in 1961.	1946–1969; Antequera, Baclayon, Balilihan, Calape, Corella, Cortes, Dauis, Loon, Maribojoc, Panglao, Tagbilaran
9		Natalio P. Castillo	September 5, 1961	September 23, 1972	6th	Nacionalista	Re-elected in 1965.	1946–1969; Antequera, Baclayon, Balilihan, Calape, Corella, Cortes, Dauis, Loon, Maribojoc, Panglao, Tagbilaran
9		Natalio P. Castillo	September 5, 1961	September 23, 1972	7th	Nacionalista	Re-elected in 1969. Removed from office after imposition of martial law.	1969–1972; Antequera, Baclayon, Balilihan, Calape, Corella, Cortes, Dauis, Loon, Maribojoc, Panglao, San Isidro, Tagbilaran
District dissolved into the thirteen-seat Region VII's at-large district for the Interim Batasang Pambansa, followed by the three-seat Bohol's at-large district for the Regular Batasang Pambansa.
District re-created February 2, 1987.
10		Venice Borja-Agana	June 30, 1987	June 30, 1998	8th	LABAN	Elected in 1987.	1987–present Alburquerque, Antequera, Baclayon, Balilihan, Calape, Catigbian, Corella, Cortes, Dauis, Loon, Maribojoc, Panglao, Sikatuna, Tagbilaran, Tubigon
10		Venice Borja-Agana	June 30, 1987	June 30, 1998	9th	Lakas	Re-elected in 1992.	1987–present Alburquerque, Antequera, Baclayon, Balilihan, Calape, Catigbian, Corella, Cortes, Dauis, Loon, Maribojoc, Panglao, Sikatuna, Tagbilaran, Tubigon
10		Venice Borja-Agana	June 30, 1987	June 30, 1998	10th	Lakas	Re-elected in 1995.	1987–present Alburquerque, Antequera, Baclayon, Balilihan, Calape, Catigbian, Corella, Cortes, Dauis, Loon, Maribojoc, Panglao, Sikatuna, Tagbilaran, Tubigon
11		Ernesto Herrera	June 30, 1998	June 30, 2001	11th	LAMMP	Elected in 1998.	1987–present Alburquerque, Antequera, Baclayon, Balilihan, Calape, Catigbian, Corella, Cortes, Dauis, Loon, Maribojoc, Panglao, Sikatuna, Tagbilaran, Tubigon
11		Ernesto Herrera	June 30, 1998	June 30, 2001	11th	Lakas	Elected in 1998.	1987–present Alburquerque, Antequera, Baclayon, Balilihan, Calape, Catigbian, Corella, Cortes, Dauis, Loon, Maribojoc, Panglao, Sikatuna, Tagbilaran, Tubigon
12		Edgar Chatto	June 30, 2001	June 30, 2010	12th	Lakas	Elected in 2001.	1987–present Alburquerque, Antequera, Baclayon, Balilihan, Calape, Catigbian, Corella, Cortes, Dauis, Loon, Maribojoc, Panglao, Sikatuna, Tagbilaran, Tubigon
12		Edgar Chatto	June 30, 2001	June 30, 2010	13th	Lakas	Re-elected in 2004.	1987–present Alburquerque, Antequera, Baclayon, Balilihan, Calape, Catigbian, Corella, Cortes, Dauis, Loon, Maribojoc, Panglao, Sikatuna, Tagbilaran, Tubigon
12		Edgar Chatto	June 30, 2001	June 30, 2010	14th	Lakas	Re-elected in 2007.	1987–present Alburquerque, Antequera, Baclayon, Balilihan, Calape, Catigbian, Corella, Cortes, Dauis, Loon, Maribojoc, Panglao, Sikatuna, Tagbilaran, Tubigon
13		Rene Relampagos	June 30, 2010	June 30, 2019	15th	Liberal	Elected in 2010.	1987–present Alburquerque, Antequera, Baclayon, Balilihan, Calape, Catigbian, Corella, Cortes, Dauis, Loon, Maribojoc, Panglao, Sikatuna, Tagbilaran, Tubigon
13		Rene Relampagos	June 30, 2010	June 30, 2019	16th	Liberal	Re-elected in 2013.	1987–present Alburquerque, Antequera, Baclayon, Balilihan, Calape, Catigbian, Corella, Cortes, Dauis, Loon, Maribojoc, Panglao, Sikatuna, Tagbilaran, Tubigon
13		Rene Relampagos	June 30, 2010	June 30, 2019	17th	NUP	Re-elected in 2016.	1987–present Alburquerque, Antequera, Baclayon, Balilihan, Calape, Catigbian, Corella, Cortes, Dauis, Loon, Maribojoc, Panglao, Sikatuna, Tagbilaran, Tubigon
(12)		Edgar Chatto	June 30, 2019	June 30, 2025	18th	Liberal	Elected in 2019.	1987–present Alburquerque, Antequera, Baclayon, Balilihan, Calape, Catigbian, Corella, Cortes, Dauis, Loon, Maribojoc, Panglao, Sikatuna, Tagbilaran, Tubigon
(12)		Edgar Chatto	June 30, 2019	June 30, 2025	19th	NUP	Re-elected in 2022.	1987–present Alburquerque, Antequera, Baclayon, Balilihan, Calape, Catigbian, Corella, Cortes, Dauis, Loon, Maribojoc, Panglao, Sikatuna, Tagbilaran, Tubigon
14		John Geesnell Yap	June 30, 2025	Incumbent	20th	LDP	Elected in 2025.	1987–present Alburquerque, Antequera, Baclayon, Balilihan, Calape, Catigbian, Corella, Cortes, Dauis, Loon, Maribojoc, Panglao, Sikatuna, Tagbilaran, Tubigon
14		John Geesnell Yap	June 30, 2025	Incumbent	20th	NUP	Elected in 2025.	1987–present Alburquerque, Antequera, Baclayon, Balilihan, Calape, Catigbian, Corella, Cortes, Dauis, Loon, Maribojoc, Panglao, Sikatuna, Tagbilaran, Tubigon

== Election results ==
=== 2025 ===
Candidate	Party	Votes	%
John Geesnell Yap	Laban ng Demokratikong Pilipino	130,661	46.84
Edgar Chatto (incumbent)	National Unity Party	105,187	37.71
Jordan Pizarras	Aksyon Demokratiko	41,841	15.00
Marybelle de la Serna	Independent	1,284	0.46
Total		278,973	100.00
Valid votes		278,973	95.89
Invalid/blank votes		11,968	4.11
Total votes		290,941	100.00
Registered voters/turnout		327,862	88.74
Laban ng Demokratikong Pilipino gain from National Unity Party			
Source: Commission on Elections

=== 2022 ===
2019 Philippine House of Representatives elections
Party	Candidate	Votes	%
NUP	Edgar Chatto	160,647	70.95%
NPC	Fabio Ontong Jr.	36,638	16.18%
Independent	Marybelle De La Serna	29,153	12.87%
Total votes		226,438	100.00%
NUP gain from Liberal			

=== 2019 ===
2019 Philippine House of Representatives elections
Party	Candidate	Votes	%
Liberal	Edgar Chatto	143,039	69.01%
NPC	Dan Neri Lim^{1}	64,242	30.99%
Total votes		207,281	100.00%
Liberal gain from NPC			

=== 2016 ===
2016 Philippine House of Representatives elections
Party	Candidate	Votes	%
Liberal	Rene Relampagos	147,405	79.47%
UNA	Joahna Cabalit-Initay	28,516	15.37%
PDP–Laban	Cresencio Alturas	9,547	5.14%
Invalid or blank votes		49,307	
Total votes		234,775	100.00%

=== 2013 ===
2013 Philippine House of Representatives elections
Party	Candidate	Votes	%
Liberal	Rene Relampagos	125,442	65.20
NPC	Dan Neri Lim	46,014	23.91
Margin of victory		79,428	41.28%
Invalid or blank votes		20,954	10.89
Total votes		192,410	100.00
Liberal hold			

=== 2010 ===
2010 Philippine House of Representatives elections
Party	Candidate	Votes	%
LDP	Rene Relampagos	92,220	50.52
Liberal	Edgar Kapirig	45,561	24.96
NPC	Oscar Glovasa	43,674	23.92
Independent	Mario Magat, Jr.	1,096	0.60
Valid ballots		182,551	90.42
Invalid or blank votes		19,333	9.58
Total votes		201,884	100.00
LDP gain from Lakas–Kampi			

== See also ==
- Legislative districts of Bohol
