= Cortes, Bohol =

Municipality in Bohol, Philippines

Cortes
- Municipality
- Municipality of Cortes
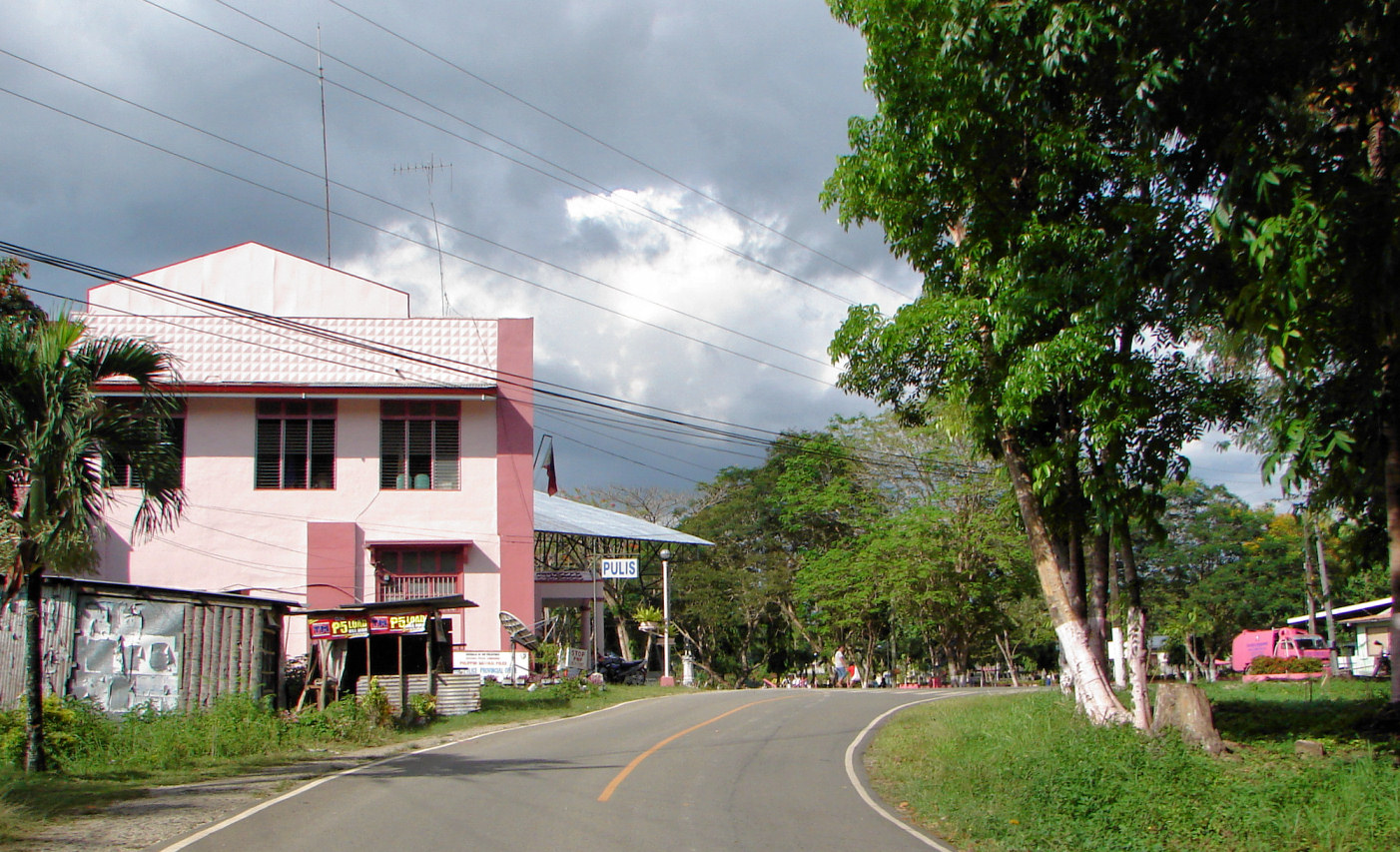
- Cortes, Bohol

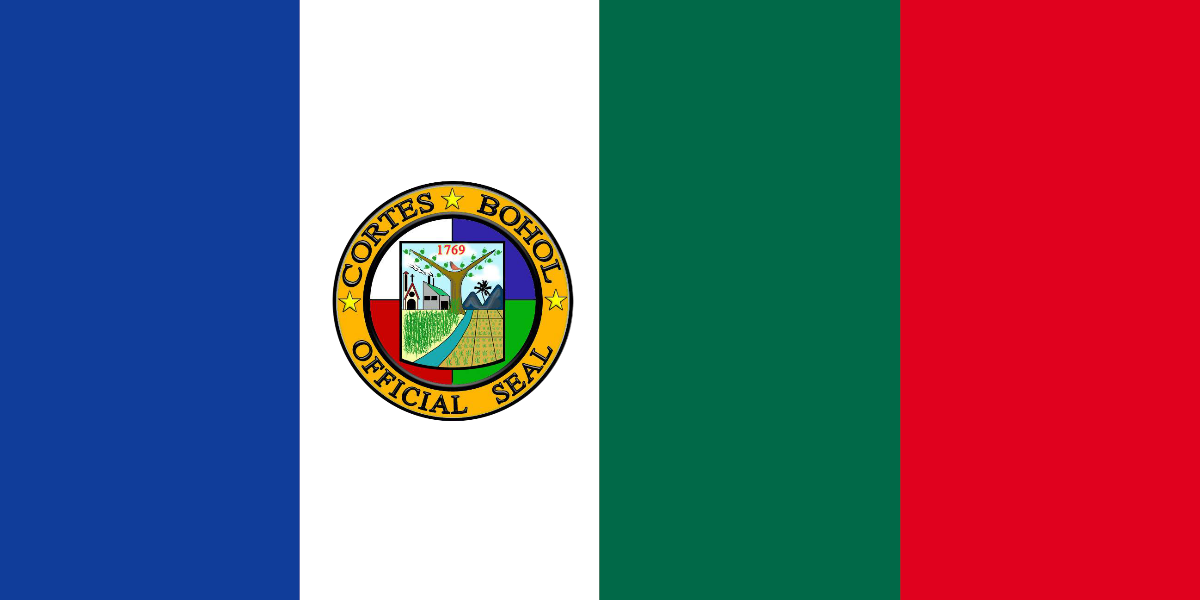
- Flag

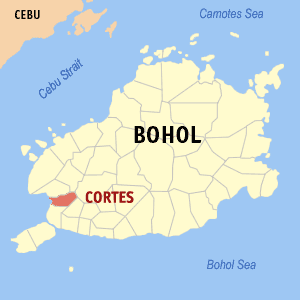
- Map of Bohol with Cortes highlighted
- Interactive map of Cortes
- Location within the Philippines
- Coordinates: 9°43′N 123°53′E
- Country: Philippines
- Region: Central Visayas
- Province: Bohol
- District: 1st district
- Named for: Hernando Cortes
- Barangays: 14 (see Barangays)

Government
  - Type: Sangguniang Bayan
  - Mayor: Rodrigo Dennis Butawan Uy
  - Vice Mayor: Niño Hinay Lumanas
  - Representative: John Geesnell Yap
  - Municipal Council: Members: Felix A. Yana; Isabelo V. Somontan; Ma. Luisa J. Jumamil; Leo G. Pabutoy; Milan G. Rebusa; Joahna C. Initay; Teodulo B. Sumabong; Marjorie U. Becera
  - Electorate: 12,359 voters (2025)

Area
  - Total: 27.32 km^{2} (10.55 sq mi)
- Elevation: 41 m (135 ft)
- Highest elevation: 354 m (1,161 ft)
- Lowest elevation: 0 m (0 ft)

Population (2024 census)
  - Total: 18,976
  - Density: 694.6/km^{2} (1,799/sq mi)
  - Households: 4,165

Economy
  - Income class: 4th municipal income class
  - Poverty incidence: 14.48% (2023)
  - Revenue: ₱ 147.9 million (2024)
  - Assets: ₱ 396.9 million (2024)
  - Expenditure: ₱ 106.4 million (2024)
  - Liabilities: ₱ 72.18 million (2024)

Service provider
  - Electricity: Bohol 1 Electric Cooperative (BOHECO 1)
- Time zone: UTC+8 (PST)
- ZIP code: 6341
- PSGC: 071216000
- IDD : area code: +63 (0)38
- Native languages: Boholano dialect Cebuano; Tagalog

Cortes, officially the Municipality of Cortes (Cebuano: Munisipalidad sa Cortes; Tagalog: Bayan ng Cortes), is a municipality in the province of Bohol, Philippines. According to the 2024 census, it has a population of 18,976 people.

The town fiesta is held every 16 January in honor of the holy child Jesus, the Santo Niño.

== History ==
The history of Cortes dates back to pre-Hispanic times – there already was a form of government way before the coming of the Spaniards. The town was known as "Malabago" after its chief, who was a contemporary of King Lomod, otherwise known as Tamblot – the first Boholano to raise arms against the Spanish conquistadors.

The Malabago settlement was situated in the upland territory of the present day Cortes near the Abatan River while that of Tamblot was at barangay Viga in the lowlands of Antequera which stretches to the riverside valleys opposite that of Malabago beyond the present day Abatan Bridge. The people of Malabago have a culture of their own and recorded their day-to-day activities in their own writing using unique characters which they carved out on a piece of bamboo using a knife called panggi or supok. Malabago then was a farming community that cultivated the land and made rice paddies in the north and east lowlands.

Tamblot's reign started in early 1600 AD and the uprising in 1621 was triggered when a Spanish priest want to take back a silver church bell (Lingganayng Ugis) which he gave to Tamblot in order to put it up in a church he built at Malabago. Tamblot resented such a move; refused to give the bell back and so started the feud between him and the Spaniards. Supporting Tamblot during the uprising, the Malabago settlement was destroyed by the Spaniards in 1621.

The settlement was transferred to Bahian which was also destroyed by the Spaniards. Again the people settled at Ylaya at the upper part of the river. Not accessible by boats, the people had to berth near the mouth of the river which they eventually called as "Dayhangan", meaning "berthing place".

The people chose to live near the mouth of the river and along the swamps. Their main livelihood was to catch fish, so the new settlement was called "Pamingwitan" ('a place where one can catch fish using a fishing rod'). In 1793 or 94, an independent parish was established.

"Pamingwitan" was renamed "Cortes". The town was probably established in 1862 during the construction of the Catholic church with the settlements of Malabago, Pamingwitan and Dayhangan jointed into one and called "Pueblo de Cortes". Toponymy suggests:

1. named after Cortes the town in Navarre of northern Spain
2. named after the Spanish conquistador, Hernán Cortés (who himself came from i.)
3. derivation from the Spanish word "cortesimo" meaning "most courteous".

The parish was dedicated to the Santo Niño. The inhabitants of the town were baptized and given instructions in the Catholic faith. Although the church was built in 1880, the bell tower's upper register was completed only in the 20th century. A boys' school building was constructed in 1895.

The town of Cortes played a prominent role during World War II. The inhabitants of the town formed a bolo battalion to fight the Japanese Invaders. Yet in 1942, the town was overwhelmed by the Japanese; houses were burned down and the school building was occupied and used as a garrison. Cortes was liberated from the Japanese a few days after the arrival of the Americans in Tagbilaran on 11 April 1945. In less than a month, the whole province of Bohol was officially declared liberated on 25 May 1945, by Major General William H. Arnold, Commander of the Americal Division.

== Geography ==
Cortes is 10 kilometres (6.2 mi) northeast of Tagbilaran. Located high up on a plateau, the town occupies a total land area of 27.32 square kilometres (10.5 sq mi).

=== Barangays ===
Cortes is politically subdivided into 14 barangays. Each barangay consists of puroks and some have sitios.

PSGC	Barangay	Population			±% p.a.	
		2024		2010		
071216001	De la Paz	14.9%	2,824	2,546	▴	0.72%
071216002	Fatima	5.8%	1,105	962	▴	0.97%
071216003	Loreto	7.9%	1,504	1,388	▴	0.56%
071216004	Lourdes	9.5%	1,808	1,668	▴	0.56%
071216005	Malayo Norte	7.5%	1,418	1,291	▴	0.65%
071216006	Malayo Sur	3.5%	658	596	▴	0.69%
071216007	Montserrat	2.5%	471	391	▴	1.30%
071216008	New Lourdes	5.1%	977	699	▴	2.35%
071216009	Patrocinio	3.9%	741	685	▴	0.55%
071216010	Poblacion	7.2%	1,367	1,273	▴	0.50%
071216011	Rosario	3.9%	734	668	▴	0.66%
071216012	Salvador	6.4%	1,208	1,105	▴	0.62%
071216013	San Roque	5.7%	1,091	1,022	▴	0.46%
071216014	Upper de la Paz	5.5%	1,048	1,000	▴	0.33%
	Total		18,976	15,294	▴	1.51%

=== Climate ===
Climate data for Cortes, Bohol
Month	Jan	Feb	Mar	Apr	May	Jun	Jul	Aug	Sep	Oct	Nov	Dec	Year
Mean daily maximum °C (°F)	28 (82)	29 (84)	30 (86)	31 (88)	31 (88)	30 (86)	29 (84)	30 (86)	30 (86)	29 (84)	28 (82)	28 (82)	29 (85)
Mean daily minimum °C (°F)	22 (72)	22 (72)	22 (72)	23 (73)	24 (75)	24 (75)	24 (75)	24 (75)	24 (75)	24 (75)	23 (73)	23 (73)	23 (74)
Average precipitation mm (inches)	102 (4.0)	85 (3.3)	91 (3.6)	75 (3.0)	110 (4.3)	141 (5.6)	121 (4.8)	107 (4.2)	111 (4.4)	144 (5.7)	169 (6.7)	139 (5.5)	1,395 (55.1)
Average rainy days	18.6	14.8	16.5	16.7	23.9	26.4	25.6	24.1	24.4	26.3	23.7	20.5	261.5
Source: Meteoblue (Use with caution: this is modeled/calculated data, not measured locally.)

== Demographics ==
Population census of Cortes
Year	Pop.	±% p.a.
1903	6,644	—
1918	7,877	+1.14%
1939	8,652	+0.45%
1948	7,959	−0.92%
1960	7,908	−0.05%
1970	8,853	+1.13%
1975	9,056	+0.46%
1980	9,350	+0.64%
1990	10,527	+1.19%
1995	11,133	+1.05%
2000	12,702	+2.87%
2007	14,586	+1.93%
2010	15,294	+1.74%
2015	16,954	+1.98%
2020	18,344	+1.67%
2024	18,976	+0.82%
Source: Philippine Statistics Authority

Medium of discourse is usual Visayan (Cebuano), but English is the medium of instruction in all schools in the town starting from the primary grades. People also understand Filipino.

The people of Cortes in majority are Roman Catholics.

== Economy ==
Poverty incidence of Cortes (%)

Source: Philippine Statistics Authority

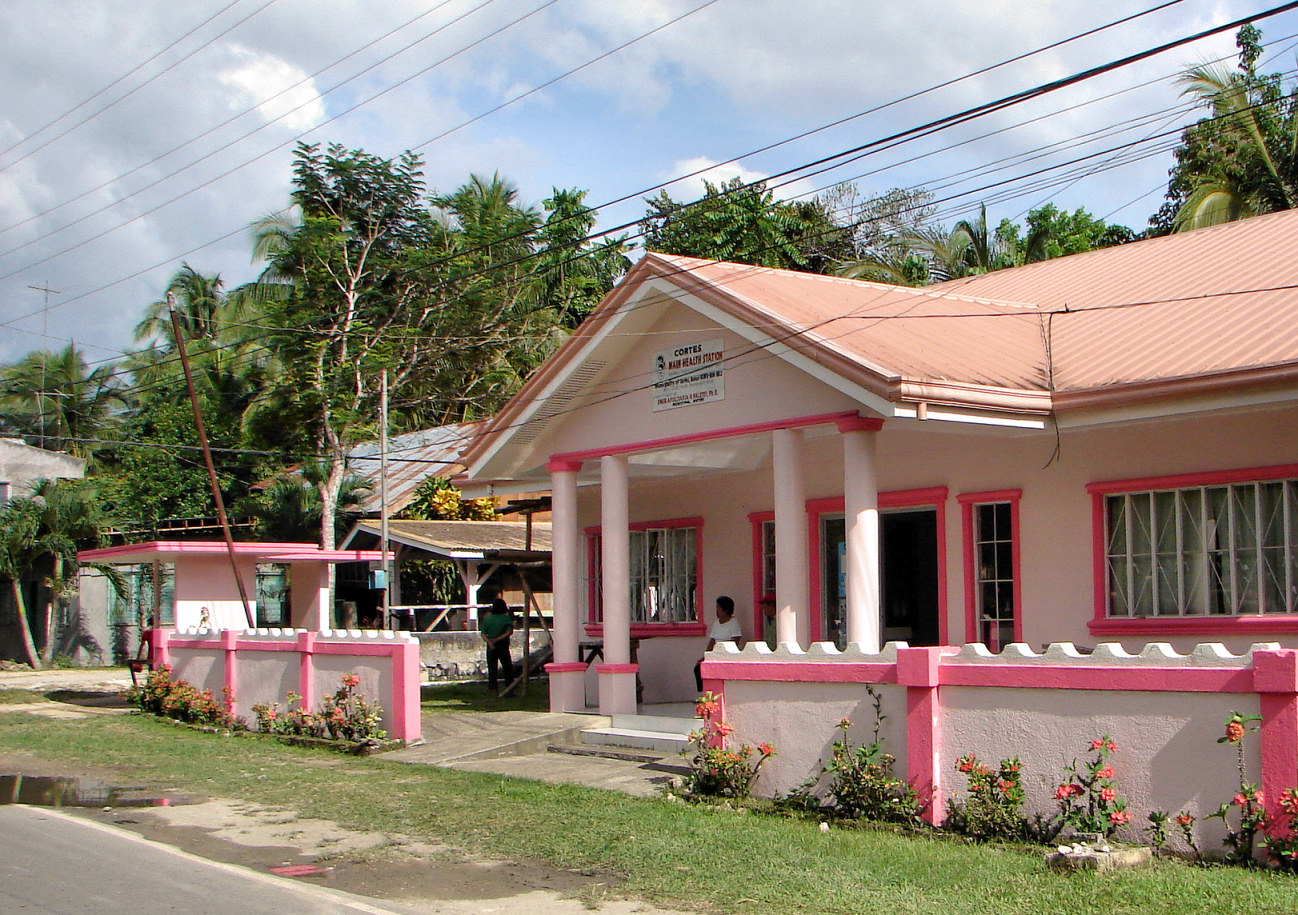
Main Health Station

Cortes is the site of the southern Industrial Projects and its subsidiary, Rolling Mills, which produces colored and non-colored galvanized iron for roofing. Rolling Mills is situated high up on a plateau overlooking the Abatan River.

The town is known for its handmade paper and papercrafts, similar to washi, but made with indigenous fibers.

The town is also known for handmade paper products chosen now as the town's priority product under the Department of Trade and Industry's One Town, One Product (OTOP) Program. Aside from the manufacturing and handicraft industries, the people of Cortes are also into agribusiness.

Sand taken from the Abatan River, and which usually finds its way to construction sites in Tagbilaran, is likewise another source of income for the people of Cortes. Flat-bottomed boats made of marine plywood carry the sand which has to be dug up from the river bed with waist-high waters – back-breaking work for those involved.

The Local Government Unit (LGU) of Cortes is also developing eco-tourism. One major project is the development of the docking port, envisaged to be the starting point for cruises on the Abatan River, which flows through five towns.

Other projects include the establishment of daycare centers in each of the town's 14 barangays. Health stations will also be constructed. The nine sources of water supply are now installed with automatic chlorinator injection system to insure the health of residents. A reservoir will also be constructed in De la Paz.

== Tourism ==
The town of Cortes has several tourism sites that yet need further development in order to attract foreign tourists. The Bacong River Heritage Conservation Tour for paddling and river trekking enthusiasts has been set up. Other sites such as the Larga Vista, an old stone building and the municipal hall are must-see.

=== Abatan River ===
The Abatan River is one of its natural assets. The river winds through the town of Antequera and from the town of Balilihan for an estimated length of 20 kilometres (12 mi). It opens at the Cortes nipa swamp, the most extensive nipa swamp in Bohol.

In former days when roads were scarce, the river served as a waterway for the people to and from the interior towns. Now, the government has seen its potential for tourism after the success of the Loboc River tours and it is now being developed.

Kayak exploration and stand-up paddle boarding are now available and can be arranged.

=== Cortes church ===
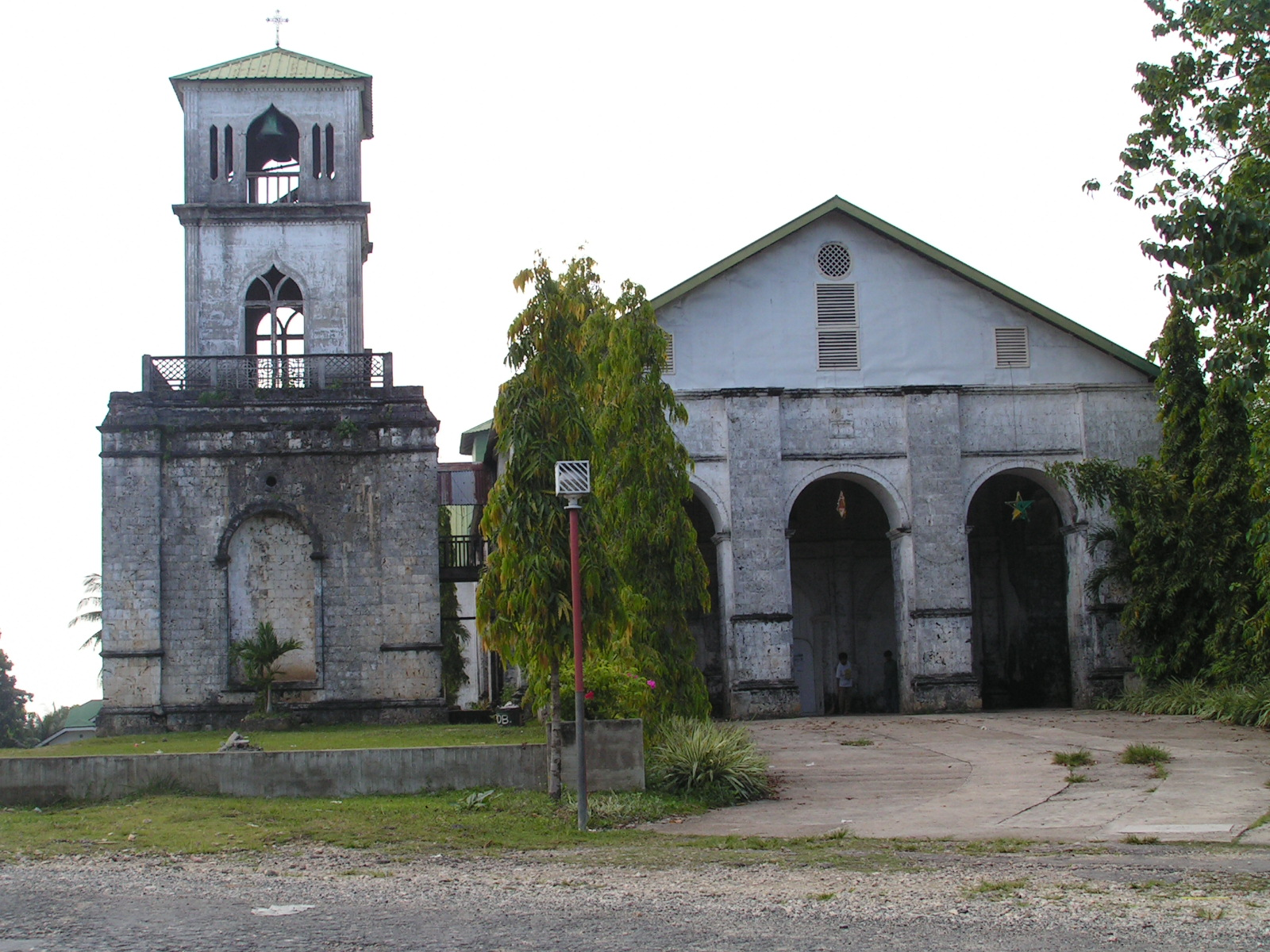
Cortes Church

The church of Cortes is the Santo Niño parish church. It is situated high up on a hill and like all Bohol churches is cruciform shape. The church dates back to the 19th century although the bell tower's upper register was not completed until the 20th century.

The church is made up of cut coral stone blocks. A portico is in front of an older façade and floral carving frames the doorway. It has frescoes on its ceilings. The main retablo has twisted Solomonic columns and profusely carved flanges in the baroque idiom.

=== Bilibili Spring ===
Bilibili Spring is another site envisioned for development by the local government for it will be the first stop of the proposed river cruise. The spring is located in Malayo Norte.
