= Catigbian =

Municipality in Bohol, Philippines

- Municipality
- Municipality of Catigbian
- Catigbian Municipal Hall in 2023

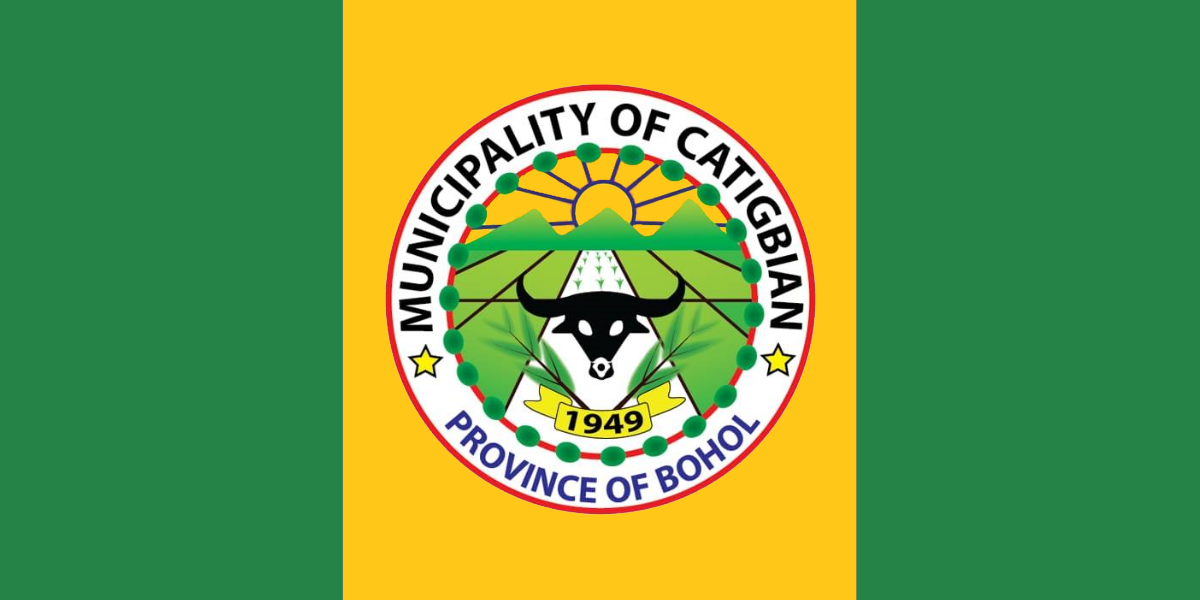
- Flag
- Anthem: Catigbian Hymn
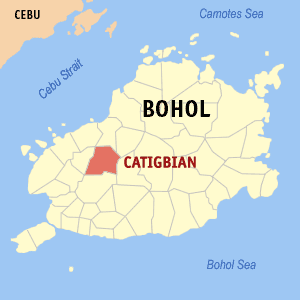
- Map of Bohol with Catigbian highlighted
- Interactive map of Catigbian
- Location within the Philippines
- Coordinates: 9°50′N 124°02′E
- Country: Philippines
- Region: Central Visayas
- Province: Bohol
- District: 1st district
- Founded: 17 June 1949
- Barangays: 22 (see Barangays)

Government
  - Type: Sangguniang Bayan
  - Mayor: Benjie S. Oliva
  - Vice Mayor: Esteban N. Angilan, Jr.
  - Representative: John Geesnell Yap
  - Municipal Council: Members: Rolando M. Saraum; Rodrigo M. Dinorog, Jr.; Oliver S. Oliva; Reynald M. Lacea; Archimedes O. Lungay; Noel A. Garsuta; Hernan B. Estavilla; Marcelino S. Rivero
  - Electorate: 16,873 voters (2025)

Area
  - Total: 113.33 km^{2} (43.76 sq mi)
- Elevation: 217 m (712 ft)
- Highest elevation: 357 m (1,171 ft)
- Lowest elevation: 91 m (299 ft)

Population (2024 census)
  - Total: 23,812
  - Density: 210.11/km^{2} (544.19/sq mi)
  - Households: 5,723

Economy
  - Income class: 3rd municipal income class
  - Poverty incidence: 19.28% (2023)
  - Revenue: ₱ 209.7 million (2024)
  - Assets: ₱ 513.4 million (2024)
  - Expenditure: ₱ 201.3 million (2024)
  - Liabilities: ₱ 50.95 million (2024)

Service provider
  - Electricity: Bohol 1 Electric Cooperative (BOHECO 1)
- Time zone: UTC+8 (PST)
- ZIP code: 6343
- PSGC: 071213000
- IDD : area code: +63 (0)38
- Native languages: Boholano dialect Cebuano; Tagalog

Catigbian, officially the Municipality of Catigbian (Cebuano: Munisipyo sa Catigbian; Tagalog: Bayan ng Catigbian), is a municipality in the province of Bohol, Philippines. According to the 2024 census, it has a population of 23,812 people.

Catigbian was formerly known as San Jacinto, and officially changed to its current name in 1954. Catigbian is named after a certain group of seed-bearing plants named "Katigbi" (Coix lacryma-jobi), which grow abundantly.

== History ==
The town was founded in 1829 as one of the villages where rebels were resettled after the Dagohoy Rebellion had been suppressed. In 1903, when the province was reorganized, it was annexed to Balilihan but was made an independent municipality once more on 17 June 1949. At that time there were only 15 barrios within the territorial limits compared to the 22 barangays it has now.

== Geography ==
Located 34 kilometres (21 mi) north of Tagbilaran, Catigbian is an interior town north of Balilihan, south of Sagbayan and Tubigon, east of San Isidro and west of Batuan.

=== Barangays ===
Catigbian is politically subdivided into 22 barangays. Each barangay consists of puroks and some have sitios.

PSGC	Barangay	Population			±% p.a.	
		2024		2010		
071213001	Alegria	5.2%	1,248	1,247	▴	0.01%
071213002	Ambuan	4.8%	1,150	1,197	▾	−0.28%
071213003	Baang	6.1%	1,442	1,381	▴	0.30%
071213004	Bagtic	4.4%	1,055	1,069	▾	−0.09%
071213005	Bonbong	2.4%	565	579	▾	−0.17%
071213007	Cambailan	3.2%	759	916	▾	−1.29%
071213008	Candumayao	6.7%	1,600	1,545	▴	0.24%
071213011	Causwagan Norte	7.4%	1,763	1,812	▾	−0.19%
071213013	Hagbuaya	3.0%	718	875	▾	−1.36%
071213014	Haguilanan	4.6%	1,094	1,133	▾	−0.24%
071213009	Kang‑iras	3.0%	724	709	▴	0.14%
071213015	Libertad Sur	1.4%	326	364	▾	−0.76%
071213016	Liboron	4.0%	954	930	▴	0.18%
071213017	Mahayag Norte	2.3%	551	577	▾	−0.32%
071213018	Mahayag Sur	1.2%	277	277	Steady	0.00%
071213019	Maitum	3.8%	896	1,035	▾	−0.99%
071213020	Mantasida	4.2%	1,001	913	▴	0.64%
071213021	Poblacion	7.8%	1,848	1,810	▴	0.14%
071213027	Poblacion Weste	7.4%	1,754	1,742	▴	0.05%
071213022	Rizal	2.9%	700	694	▴	0.06%
071213025	Sinakayanan	3.8%	913	733	▴	1.53%
071213026	Triple Union	4.8%	1,149	1,148	▴	0.01%
	Total		23,812	22,686	▴	0.34%

=== Climate ===
Climate data for Catigbian, Bohol
Month	Jan	Feb	Mar	Apr	May	Jun	Jul	Aug	Sep	Oct	Nov	Dec	Year
Mean daily maximum °C (°F)	26 (79)	27 (81)	28 (82)	30 (86)	30 (86)	29 (84)	29 (84)	29 (84)	29 (84)	28 (82)	27 (81)	27 (81)	28 (83)
Mean daily minimum °C (°F)	22 (72)	21 (70)	22 (72)	22 (72)	23 (73)	23 (73)	23 (73)	23 (73)	23 (73)	23 (73)	22 (72)	22 (72)	22 (72)
Average precipitation mm (inches)	98 (3.9)	82 (3.2)	96 (3.8)	71 (2.8)	104 (4.1)	129 (5.1)	101 (4.0)	94 (3.7)	99 (3.9)	135 (5.3)	174 (6.9)	143 (5.6)	1,326 (52.3)
Average rainy days	18.0	14.1	17.1	16.8	23.7	25.7	25.8	23.3	24.2	25.9	24.0	20.6	259.2
Source: Meteoblue (modeled/calculated data, not measured locally)

== Demographics ==
Population census of Catigbian
Year	Pop.	±% p.a.
1903	1,580	—
1960	13,438	+3.83%
1970	13,782	+0.25%
1975	15,570	+2.48%
1980	15,620	+0.06%
1990	17,362	+1.06%
1995	17,596	+0.25%
2000	21,461	+4.35%
2007	23,333	+1.16%
2010	22,686	−1.02%
2015	22,675	−0.01%
2020	23,805	+1.03%
2024	23,812	+0.01%
Source: Philippine Statistics Authority

== Economy ==
Poverty incidence of Catigbian (%)

Source: Philippine Statistics Authority

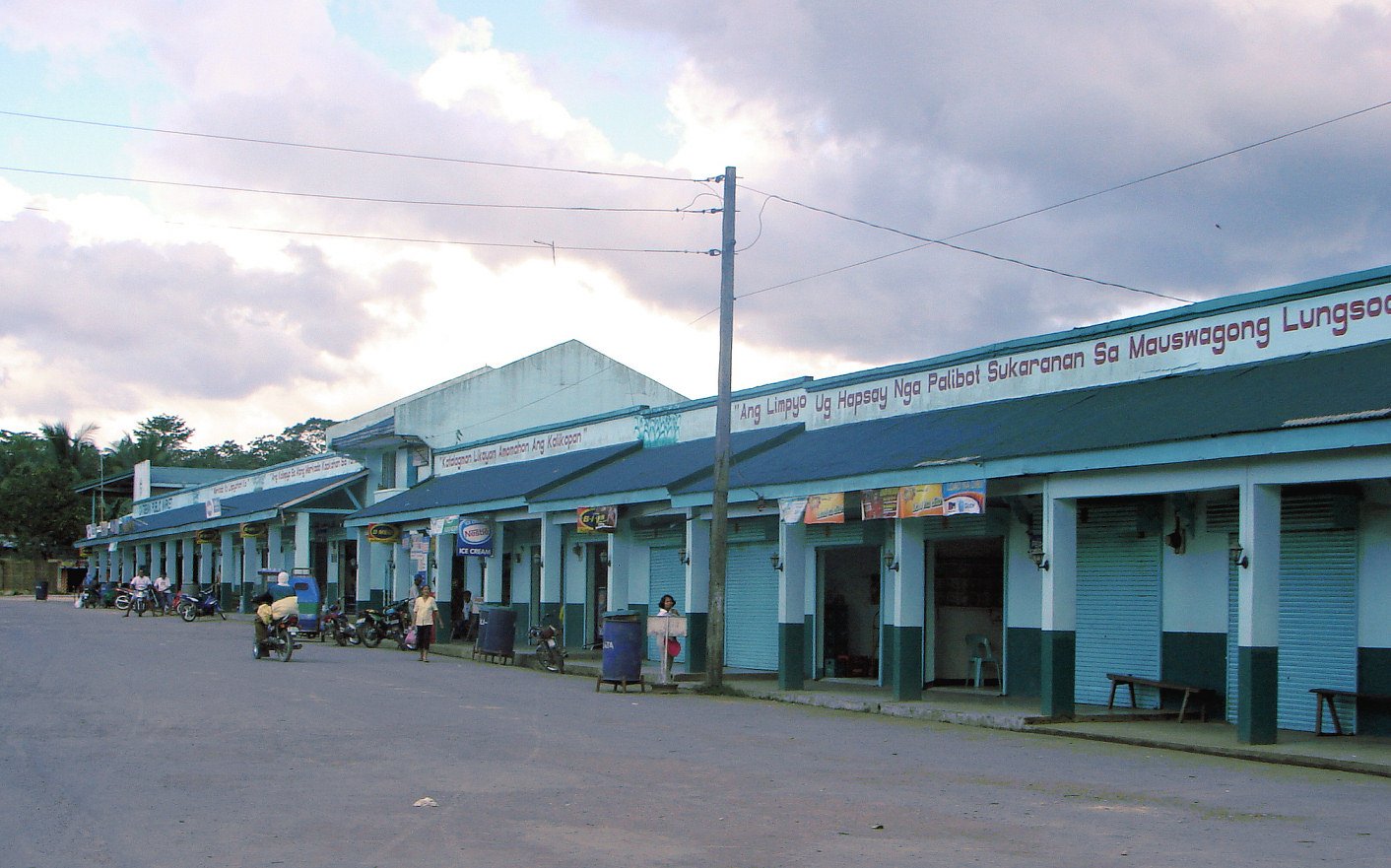
Public market

=== Commerce and industry ===
- Catigbian Public Market
- Livestock Auction Center – the biggest in the province of Bohol
- Abattoir
- Catigbian Waterworks System
- One Town One Product (OTOP) Display Center

=== Agriculture ===
- 8,950 ha (22,100 acres) alienable & disposable land
  - 43.85% devoted to crops
  - 56.15% pasture land, grassland, idle land
- 2,351 ha (5,809 acres) forestal land
  - Livestock raising (alternative)

== Infrastructure ==
=== Water ===
- 3 Pumping Stations for 12 barangays – 500 m^{3} (130 thousand US gallons) /day
- 2 more barangays with own pumping station

=== Facilities ===
- Catigbian Training Center
- Municipal Court Hall
- Municipal Conference Hall
- Public Market
- Tennis Court
- Basketball Court/Multi-Purpose Court (sports and other activities)
- Catigbian District Hospital
- Municipal Health Center

== Feast Days & Patron Saints ==
Catigbian comprises two parishes:

- Immaculate Conception Parish (church located in Poblacion West), which celebrates its Feast Day on 8 December in honor of the Immaculate conception of the Virgin Mary
- Santo Niño Parish (church located in Baang), which celebrates its feast day on the third Saturday of January in honor of the Holy Child Jesus

== Tourism ==
Catigbian is home to caves, hanging bridges, handicrafts, livestock market and for its nature resort. Among its attractions are

- Betn'Choy Farms and Resort
- Rizal Hanging Bridge
- Cantalina Cave
- Haguilanan Cave
- Candumayao Cave
- Bongbong Cave
- Dagook Falls

=== The Katigbawan Festival ===
What distinguishes Catigbian from other towns is its annual festival, the Katigbawan, which is a week-long festival in June consisting of various activities like carabao-racing, hog-catching, agrofair, motocross and a search for Miss Katigbawan.

This four-day event has several activities lined up starting with the opening of the festival with a parade after a holy mass. It is followed by a comparza and a talent contest of Miss Katigbawan candidates during the day. Judging of the display of agrofair, bloodletting and motocross takes place on the second day. On the third day is the Carabao Parade with carabao-racing and hog-catching at central elementary school and the Miss Katigbawan Beauty Pageant in the evening. (Note: The winner represents the town in the province's most prestigious pageant – Miss Bohol Sandugo – held in July) On the fourth day is the street dancing, then a fireworks display to cap the festival.

== Education ==
Literacy Rate: 87.9%

1 Tertiary School

- Bohol Northwestern Colleges
7 Secondary and high schools
  - Catigbian National High School
  - Haguilanan High School
  - Hagbuaya High School
  - Holy Infant Academy
  - Immaculate Mary Academy
  - Mahayag High School
  - Mantacida National High School

19 Public Elementary Schools
3 Primary Schools
22 Day Care Centers

== See also ==
- List of renamed cities and municipalities in the Philippines
