= Gerardo Saco Jr. =

Filipino Catholic prelate (born 1965)

The Reverend Father Gerardo Saco Jr.
- Church: Catholic
- Diocese: Tagbilaran
- Appointed: March 25, 2026 (withdrew May 5, 2026)
- Predecessor: Alberto S. Uy
- Successor: Crispin Varquez

Orders
- Ordination: April 26, 1993

Personal details
- Born: October 16, 1965 (age 61) Tagbilaran, Bohol, Philippines
- Education: Immaculate Heart of Mary Seminary; San Carlos Seminary, Cebu City

Ordination history
History
Priestly ordination
- Date: April 26, 1993

Gerardo Fortich Saco Jr. (born October 16, 1965) is a Filipino Catholic priest. He is a former bishop-elect of Tagbilaran in Bohol, having withdrawn from his appointment in 2026.

== Early life and education ==
Gerardo Fortich Saco Jr. was born on October 16, 1965, in Tagbilaran. He studied philosophy at the Immaculate Heart of Mary Seminary in Tagbilaran, and theology at San Carlos Seminary in Cebu City.

== Ministry ==
=== Priesthood ===
Saco was ordained to the priesthood on April 26, 1993. Following his ordination, he became parish priest of Saint Vincent Ferrer Parish Church in Calape until 1997, where he was transferred to Santa Monica Parish in Alburquerque. For a brief two-year period from 2001 to 2003, he was a missionary priest in Libya, and a visiting priest at Our Lady Queen of Martyrs Church in Centerport, New York from 2003 to 2005. He also became parish priest of Dauis Church from 2009 to 2015 Maribojoc from 2015 to 2021 and Most Holy Trinity Parish-Manga from 2021 to 2025. In 2023, he was appointed vicar general of the diocese.

On October 4, 2025, he was elected diocesan administrator following the departure of Alberto S. Uy, its seventh bishop, for the Metropolitan Archdiocese of Cebu.

==== Bishop-elect of Tagbilaran ====
Pope Leo XIV appointed Saco as the eighth Bishop of Tagbilaran on March 25, 2026, the Feast of the Annunciation. His episcopal consecration was scheduled for May 26, 2026. However, in a statement dated May 5, 2026, he withdrew from his appointment and decided not to proceed with the scheduled episcopal ordination, asking the understanding of the faithful for his "change of heart", citing awareness of his human limitations and adequacy.

Catholic Church titles
Preceded by Alberto S. Uy	Bishop-elect of Tagbilaran; March 25, 2026 – May 5, 2026
