= List of Cultural Properties of the Philippines in Alburquerque, Bohol =

The list of Cultural Properties of the Philippines in Alburquerque, Bohol contains relevant cultural buildings in the Philippine municipality of Alburquerque.

== List of properties ==
Cultural Property wmph identifier (Note: wmph is an internal identifier used by Wikimedia Philippines to identify the monument. This is not an official identifier, and only shown temporarily in the templates until the government creates an updated complete list.)	Site name	Description	Province	City or municipality	Address	Coordinates	Image
	Santa Monica Church	Construction began in 1885 and completed in the 1930s	Bohol	Alburquerque			Upload file
	Escuela de niños		Bohol	Alburquerque			Upload Photo
	Alburquerque Public Market		Bohol	Alburquerque			Upload Photo
	Plaza Ancestral House	built around 1915	Bohol	Alburquerque			Upload file
	Ungab Ancestral House	built around 1925	Bohol	Alburquerque			Upload Photo
	Daral Ancestral House	built around 1930	Bohol	Alburquerque			Upload Photo
	Manlangit Ancestral House	built around 1953 (based on inscription on floor)	Bohol	Alburquerque			Upload file
	Bongabong Ancestral House		Bohol	Alburquerque			Upload file
	Sinajon Ancestral House	built before 1931 and remodeled around 1950	Bohol	Alburquerque			Upload file
	Dumagan Ancestral House		Bohol	Alburquerque			Upload Photo

== Sources ==
- Akpenodu, Erik; Saloma, Czarina (2011). Casa Boholana: Vintage Houses of Bohol. Manila: Ateneo de Manila UP. ISBN 978-9715506182.
