= Alburquerque Church =

Roman Catholic church in Bohol, Philippines

Santa Monica Parish
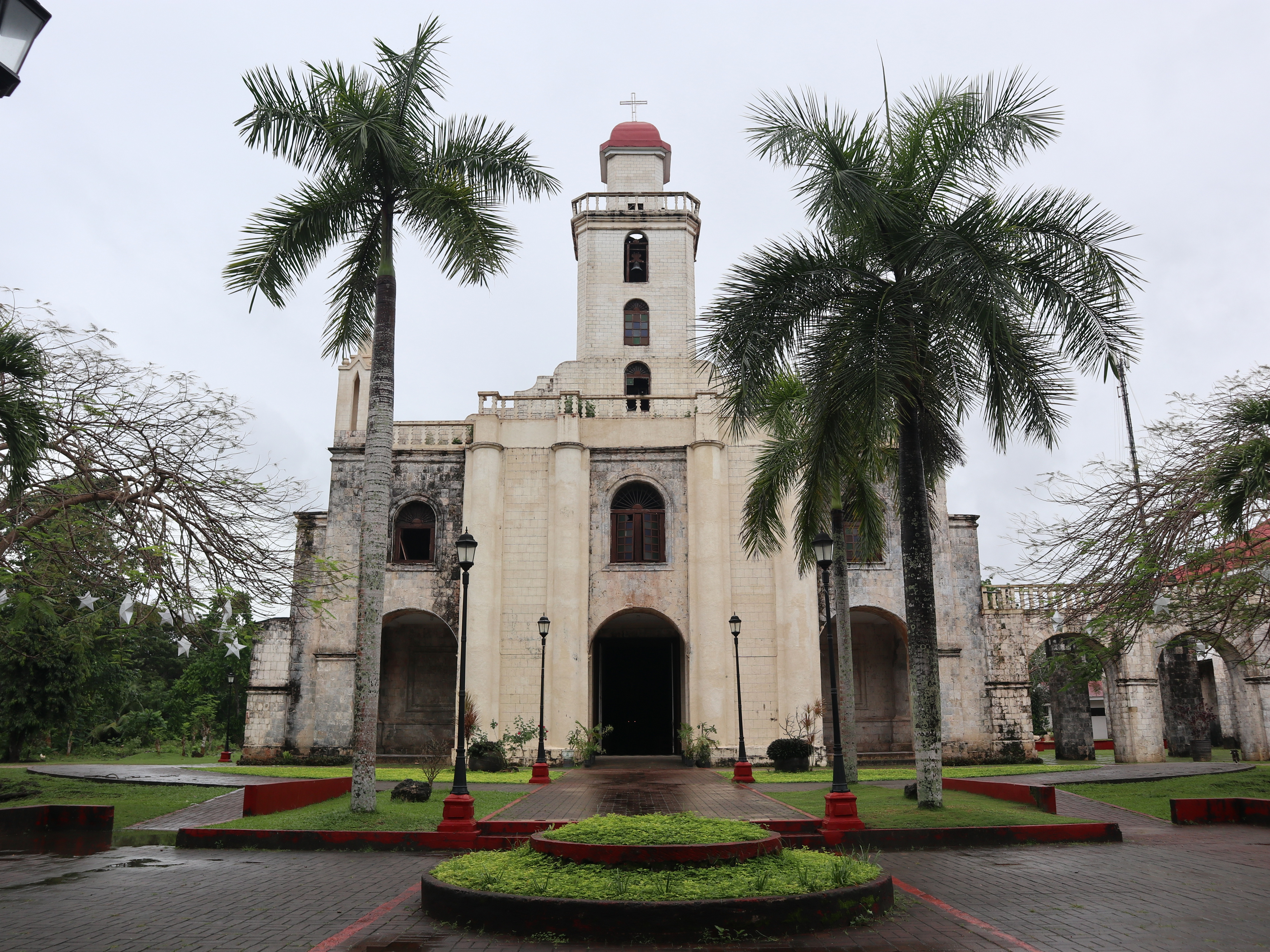
- Church facade in 2023

- Location in the Visayas Location in the Philippines
- 9°37′22″N 123°54′44″E
- Location: Poblacion, Alburquerque, Bohol
- Country: Philippines
- Denomination: Roman Catholic
- Website: Diocese of Tagbilaran

History
- Status: Parish church
- Founded: 1842
- Dedication: Santa Monica

Architecture
- Functional status: Active
- Architectural type: Church building

Specifications
- Materials: Coral stones

Administration
- Province: Cebu
- Archdiocese: Cebu
- Diocese: Tagbilaran

Clergy
- Archbishop: Alberto Uy (designate)
- Bishop: "Sede vacante"
- Priest: Fr. Allan Clarabal

Santa Monica Parish Church, commonly known as the Alburquerque Church, is a Roman Catholic church in the municipality of Alburquerque, Bohol, Philippines. It is under the jurisdiction of the Diocese of Tagbilaran. The church was declared as an Important Cultural Property by the National Museum of the Philippines in 2013.

The church was partially damaged when a 7.2-magnitude earthquake struck Bohol and other parts of Central Visayas on October 15, 2013. It was declared a National Historical Landmark by the National Historical Institute in 2014.

== Church history ==
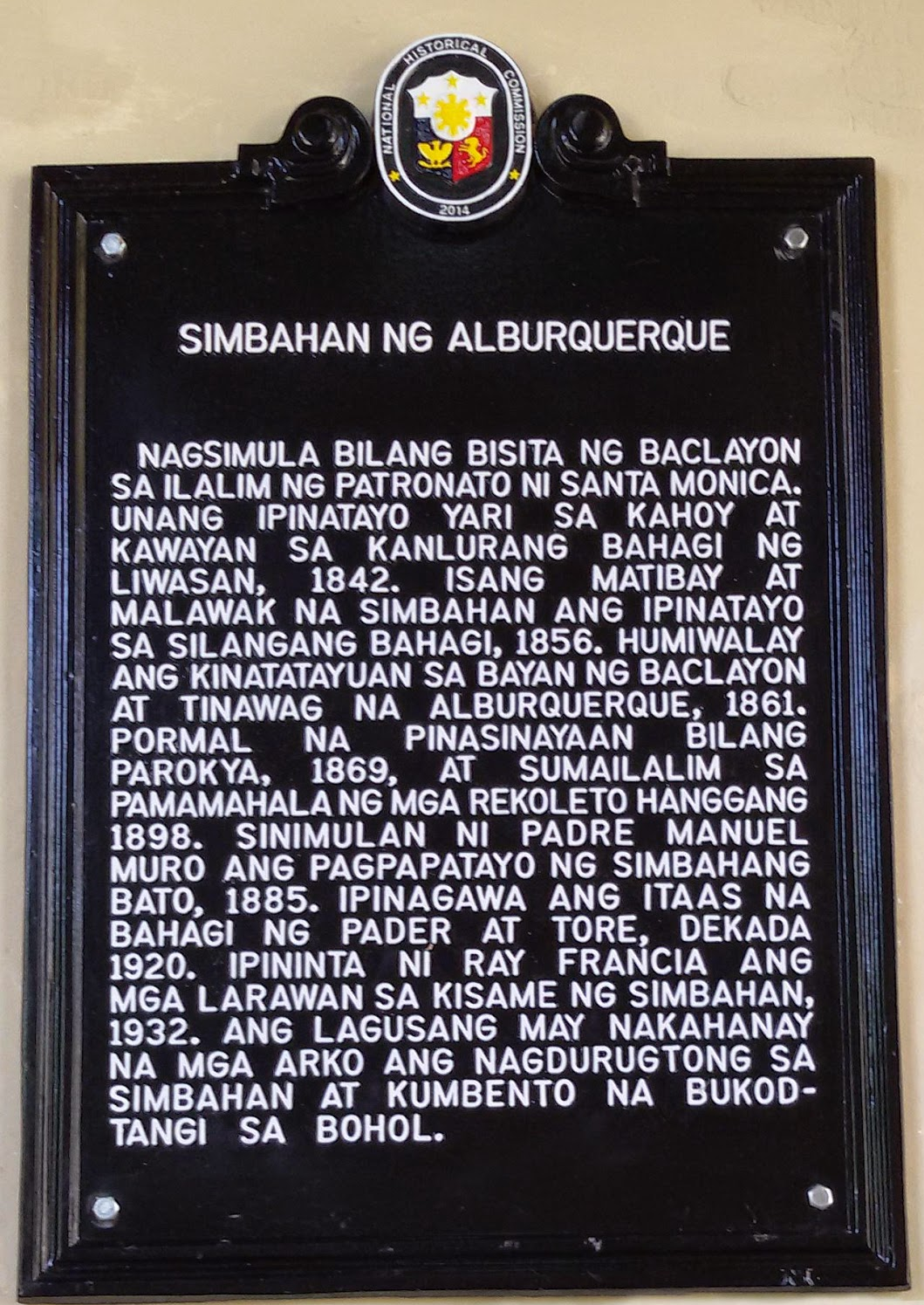
Church NHC historical marker installed in 2014

=== Visita of Baclayon ===
The parish traces its beginnings as a visita of Baclayon Church. The settlement in the area was then known as Sagunto, after a town in Valencia, Spain. Upon the request of Doña Mariana Irag, a chapel, convento and school were erected in 1842 at the boundary between the towns of Baclayon and Loay. The first structure in 1842 was made of wood and bamboo and was erected at the western end of the plaza, approximately where the present school stands. A larger and sturdier church was constructed on the eastern side of the plaza in 1856. The settlement was officially elevated to a town in 1861 and adopted a new name of Alburquerque, after a town in Badajoz, Spain.

=== Inauguration as parish ===
The parish was formally inaugurated in 1869, eight years after the settlement became a town. The parish was under the jurisdiction of the Augustinian Recollects until 1898, after which the secular clergy took over.

Until the 1880s, the parish church appeared like a huge shed with three aisles and wells made of tabique. The construction of the convent was begun under Fr. Tomas Fernandez (1869-1875). The present church structure was built under Fr. Manuel Muro in 1885, utilizing the same three-aisled plan. Construction was commenced in 1896 by his successor. The upper portions of the walls and the tower over the facade were completed only in the 1920s-1930s.

=== Historical and cultural declarations ===
In 2013, the National Museum of the Philippines declared the church an Important Cultural Property. A historical marker was unveiled by the National Historical Commission of the Philippines on August 27, 2014.

== Architecture ==
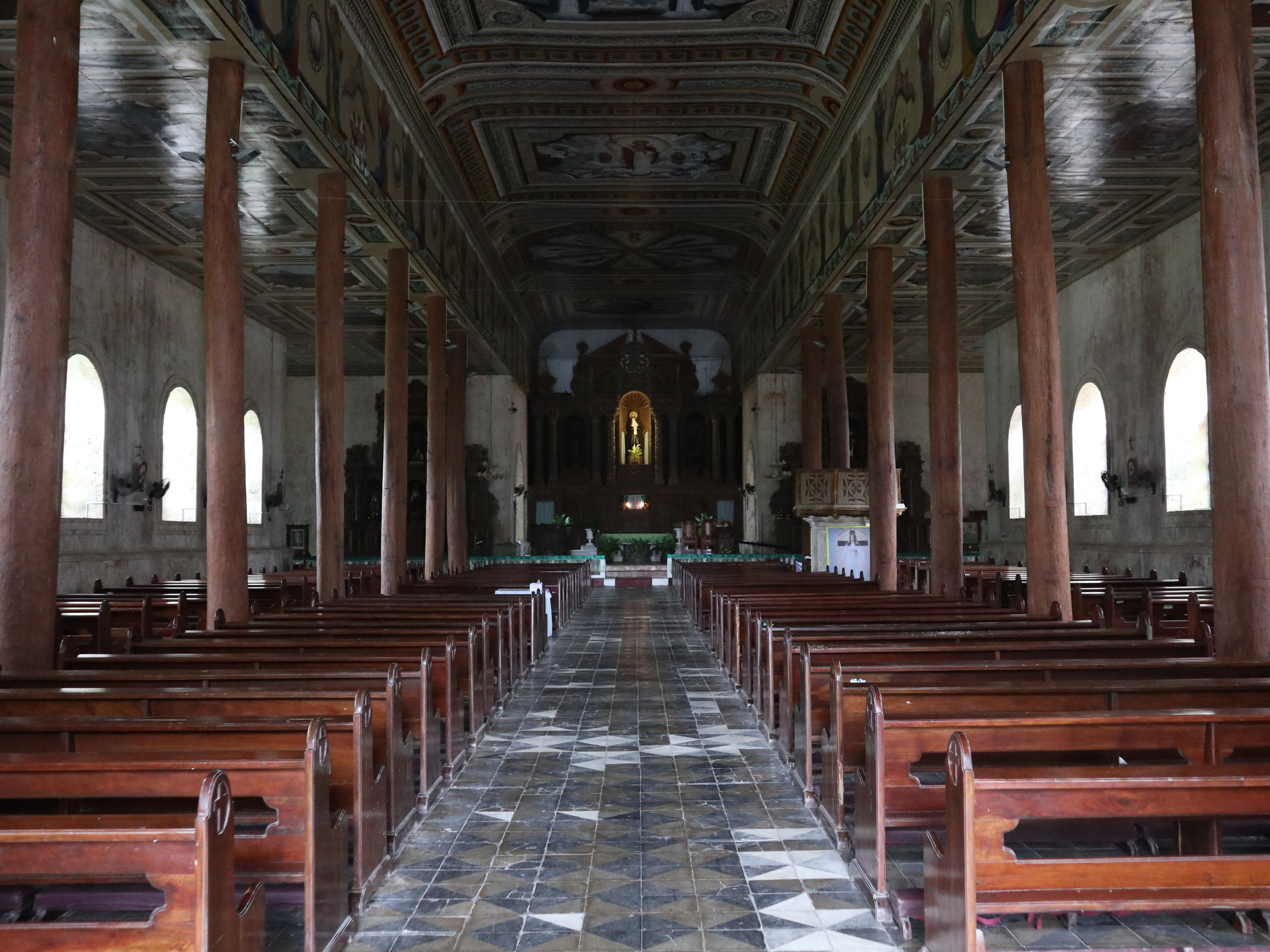
Church interior in 2023

The Alburquerque Church is in the shape of a cruciform. Remains of a low stone wall mark the boundaries of the church complex. A low hill and a ravine is located behind the whole complex. This may have a defensive purpose.

=== Facade ===
The church has a portico on the front which is actually the choir loft on the second floor. This choirloft/portico feature is typical of many Bohol churches. A series of arches in the frontage bestows a unique grace and rhythm to the ensemble.

=== Altar ===
The original retablo is gone, although there are two smaller neo-Gothic style ones at both ends of the transept. These smaller side retablos are painted to simulate three-dimensional carvings. The old pulpit is still being used. On both sides of the main altar are sacristies or storage-areas.

=== Ceiling ===
Ray Francia painted the ceiling of the church from April 12 to August 3, 1932. His signature is on one side of the choirloft.

=== Other interior details ===
Pillars made of large tree trunks masked by metal sheets march down the aisle of the church. It is being argued that these pillars date back to the original 1880 structure.

=== Choirloft ===
The choirloft can be reached from the second floor of the convent by crossing the arcade. A stairway from the choirloft leads down to the nave of the church. Another staircase in the center leads up to the bell tower.

=== Bell tower ===
The bell tower is quadrangular and was constructed in the early decades of the 20th century. Three patron saints of the parish are inscribed among the bells: Santa Monica, San Agustin and "Calipay" (Joy).

=== Exterior ===
An arcade links the church to the convento. A wide field in front of the church enables the structure to dominate over its surroundings. The grotto at the back of the courtyard hides a ruin, presumably another unfinished arcade. To the left of the church are the original twin buildings for the escuela de ninos built in the 1880s.

=== Convento ===
The parish rectory has a coralstone ground floor and an upper floor made of wooden boards, tabique and bricks. Over the main entrance appears the year of the inauguration which is 1876. The convento has a grand twin stairway, made under Fr. Manuel Muro (1882-1896). There is a proto-museum in one corner of the upper floor, containing some of the church's antiquities. The back of the convento has a veranda offering a view of the church. The eastern end of the convento has a massive open-air terrace or azotea built by Fray Manuel simultaneously with the stairway.

== 2013 Bohol earthquake ==
The Alburquerque church sustained minimal damage from the 2013 Bohol earthquake. Three years prior to the quake, restoration work was already being done in the parish. It is notably one of the few intact churches after the earthquake in the tourist trail of Bohol.

== Historical marker ==
On August 27, 2014, the National Historical Commission of the Philippines installed and unveiled a historical marker at the facade of the church. The marker reads as follows:

SIMBAHAN NG ALBURQUERQUE
NAGSIMULA BILANG BISITA NG BACLAYON SA ILALIM NG PATRONATO NI SANTA MONICA. UNANG IPINATAYO YARI SA KAHOY AT KAWAYAN SA KANLURANG BAHAGI NG LIWASAN, 1842. ISANG MATIBAY AT MALAWAK NA SIMBAHAN ANG IPINATAYO SA SILANGANG BAHAGI, 1856. HUMIWALAY ANG KINATATAYUAN SA BAYAN NG BACLAYON AT TINAWAG NA ALBURQUERQUE, 1861. PORMAL NA PINASINAYAAN BILANG PAROKYA, 1869. AT SUMAILALIM SA PAMAMAHALA NG MGA REKOLETO HANGGANG 1898. SINIMULAN NI PADRE MANUEL MURO ANG PAGPAPATAYO NG SIMBAHANG BATO, 1885. IPINAGAWA ANG ITAAS NA BAHAGI NG PADER AT TORE, DEKADA, 1920. IPININTA NI RAY FRANCIA ANG MGA LARAWAN SA KISAME NG SIMBAHAN, 1932. ANG LAGUSANG MAY NAKAHANAY NA MGA ARKO ANG NAGDURUGTONG SA SIMBAHAN AT KUMBENTO NA BUKOD-TANGI SA BOHOL.

== Bibliography ==
- Jose, Regalado Trota (2001). Visita Iglesia Bohol (A Guide to Historic Churches). Manila: National Commission for Culture and the Arts. pp. 75–80. ISBN 9718140166.
