= Tagbilaran Cathedral =

Roman Catholic church in Bohol, Philippines

- Diocesan Shrine and Cathedral-Parish of Saint Joseph the Worker
- Pang-Diyosesis na Dambana at Parokyang Katedral ni San Jose Manggagawa (Filipino); Santuario Diocesano y Parroquia Catedral de San José Obrero (Spanish)
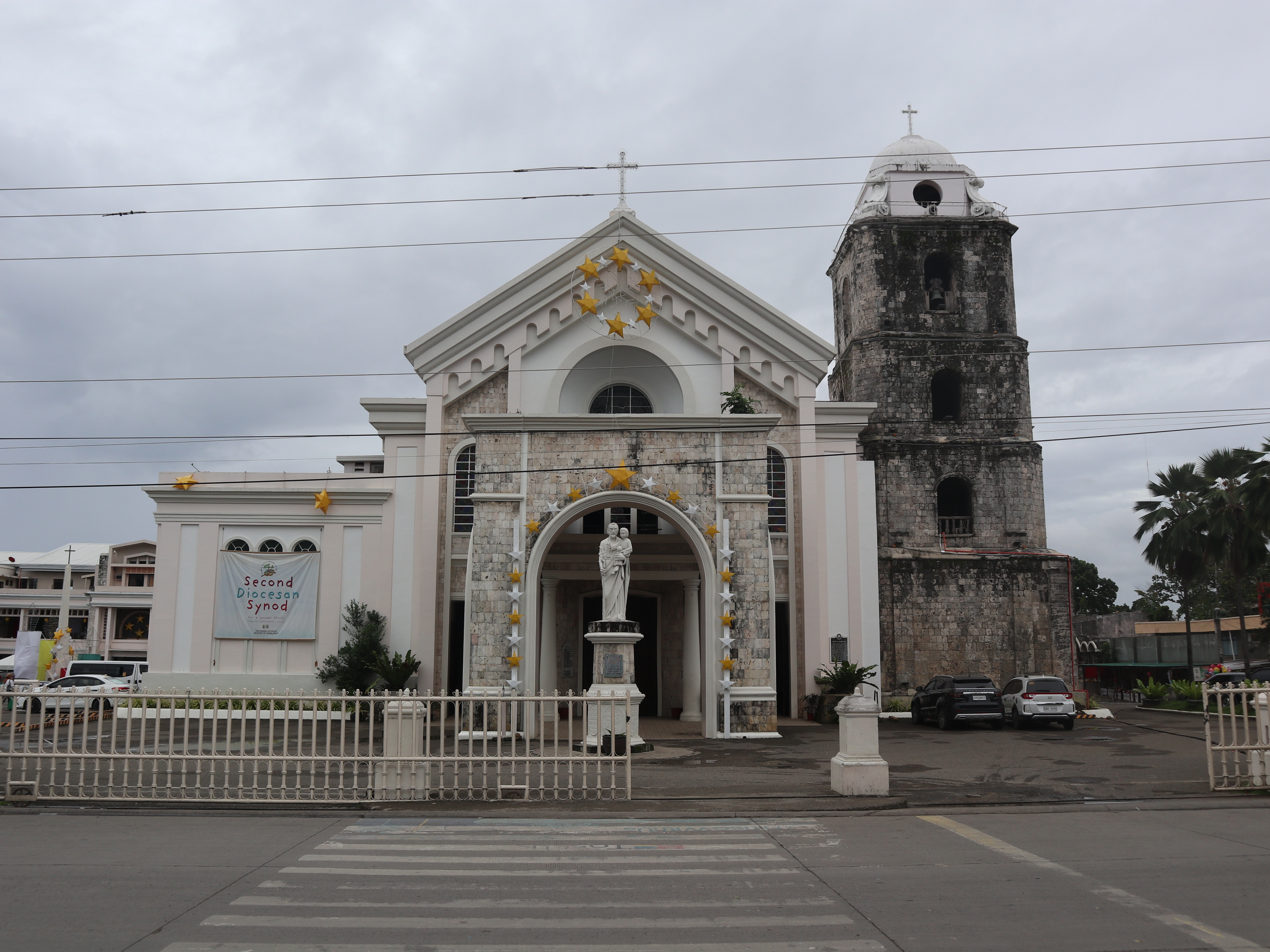
- The cathedral in January 2023

- Location in the Visayas Location in the Philippines
- 9°38′21″N 123°51′21″E
- Location: Tagbilaran, Bohol
- Country: Philippines
- Denomination: Roman Catholic

History
- Former name: Saint Joseph the Worker Cathedral
- Status: Cathedral and Shrine
- Founded: 1595
- Dedication: Saint Joseph the Worker
- Consecrated: 1767

Architecture
- Functional status: Active
- Architectural type: Church building
- Style: Eclectic
- Completed: 1855, 1888

Administration
- Province: Cebu
- Diocese: Tagbilaran
- Deanery: Saint Joseph the Worker
- Parish: Saint Joseph the Worker

Clergy
- Archbishop: Alberto Uy
- Bishop: Most Reverend Crispin “Bai” Barrete Varquez, D.D.

The Diocesan Shrine and Cathedral-Parish of Saint Joseph the Worker, commonly known as Tagbilaran Cathedral, is a Roman Catholic cathedral in Tagbilaran, Philippines. It is the seat of the Diocese of Tagbilaran which comprises Bohol's western half. The cathedral is located in Tagbilaran poblacion and was installed with a historical marker by the National Historical Commission of the Philippines in 1953.

== History ==
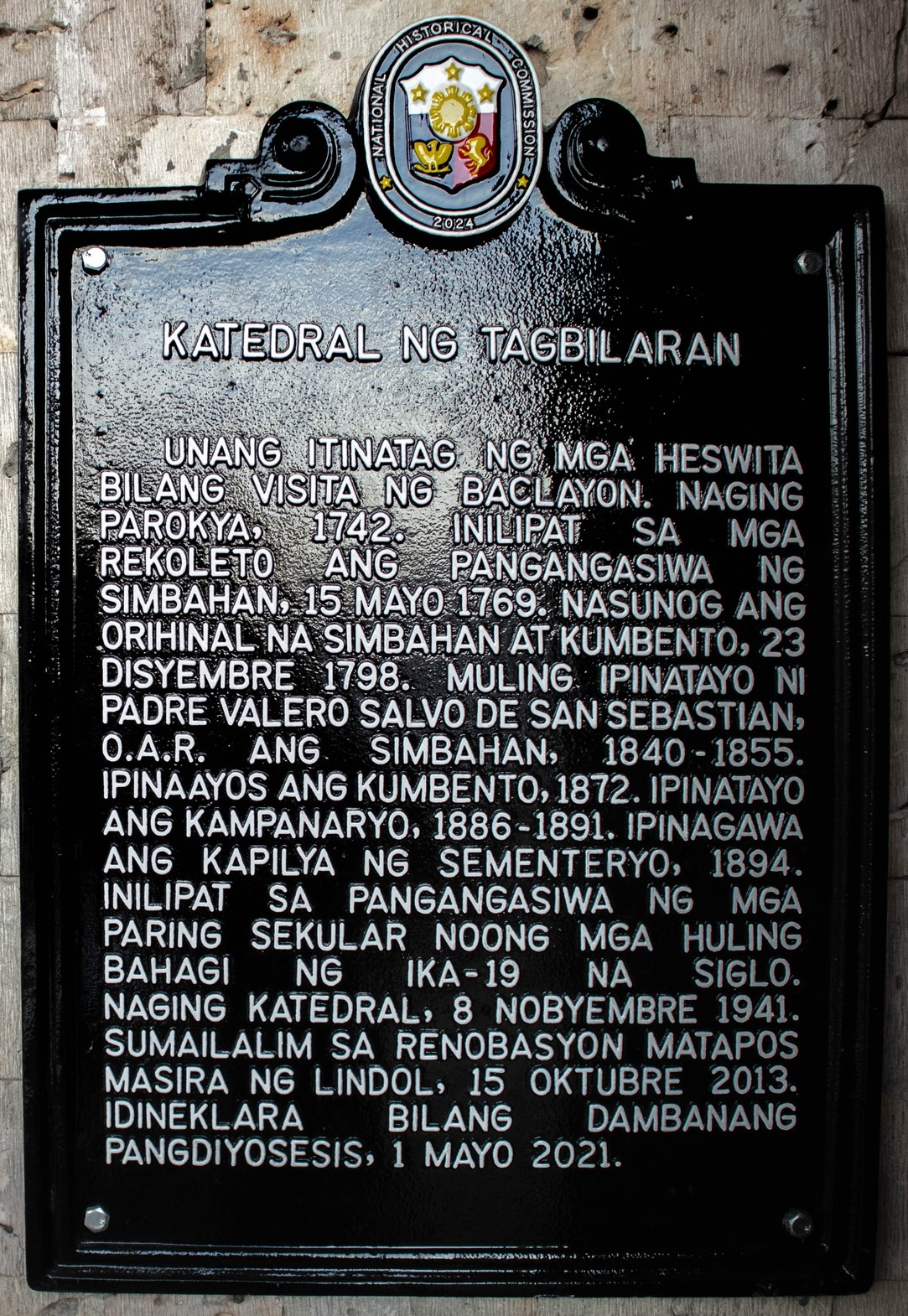
Church NHC historical marker installed in 2024

Tagbilaran is one of the six parishes founded in 1595 by the Jesuit missionaries in Bohol. In 1768, the parish administration was given to the Augustinian Recollects. The Jesuits built the original church which was razed by fire on December 23, 1798. Under the helm of Fr. Valero de San Pascual, the church was reconstructed and was enlarged from 1839 to 1855. The convent was built under Fr. Lucas Corominas while the tower was constructed under Fr. Jose Sancho from 1884 to 1888. The church premises was improved from 1884 to 1894 with the installation of iron cornices, tiles for flooring and chandeliers under Fr. Escolastico Enciso.

Between 1945 and 1951, reinforced concrete was used to replace the wooden flooring, original frescoes were removed, and permanent narra cornices were placed under Bishop Julio Rosales and Fr. Arturo Tecson. Under Bishop Manuel Mascariñas, Fr. Pedro Namoc and Fr. Camilo Auza, the church façade and choir loft were changed, the interior and exterior walls were renovated, and the main altar was pushed back by 3 metres (10 feet) to widen the presbytery, all of which were done from 1952 to 1970. Between 1977 and 1989, the cathedral plaza was fenced with concrete, the convent and parish offices were extended, the cathedral was improved and repainted with its roofing totally changed, and the perpetual adoration chapel was constructed under Msgr. Pelagio Dompor. From 1991 to 1997, the cathedral grounds was beautified and landscaped, the stained glass windows were installed, the cathedral wings were built, the adoration chapel was renovated, the Saint Joseph the Worker Statue was installed at the church façade, the church portico façade was added, and the cement plaster on bell tower by Msgr. Cirilo D. Darunday Jr. Due to the 2013 Bohol earthquake, the exterior and interior of the cathedral had undergone major reconstructions, including the church's ceiling paintings.

On May 1, 2021, the cathedral was elevated to a diocesan shrine by Bishop Alberto Uy of the Tagbilaran Diocese.

== Gallery ==
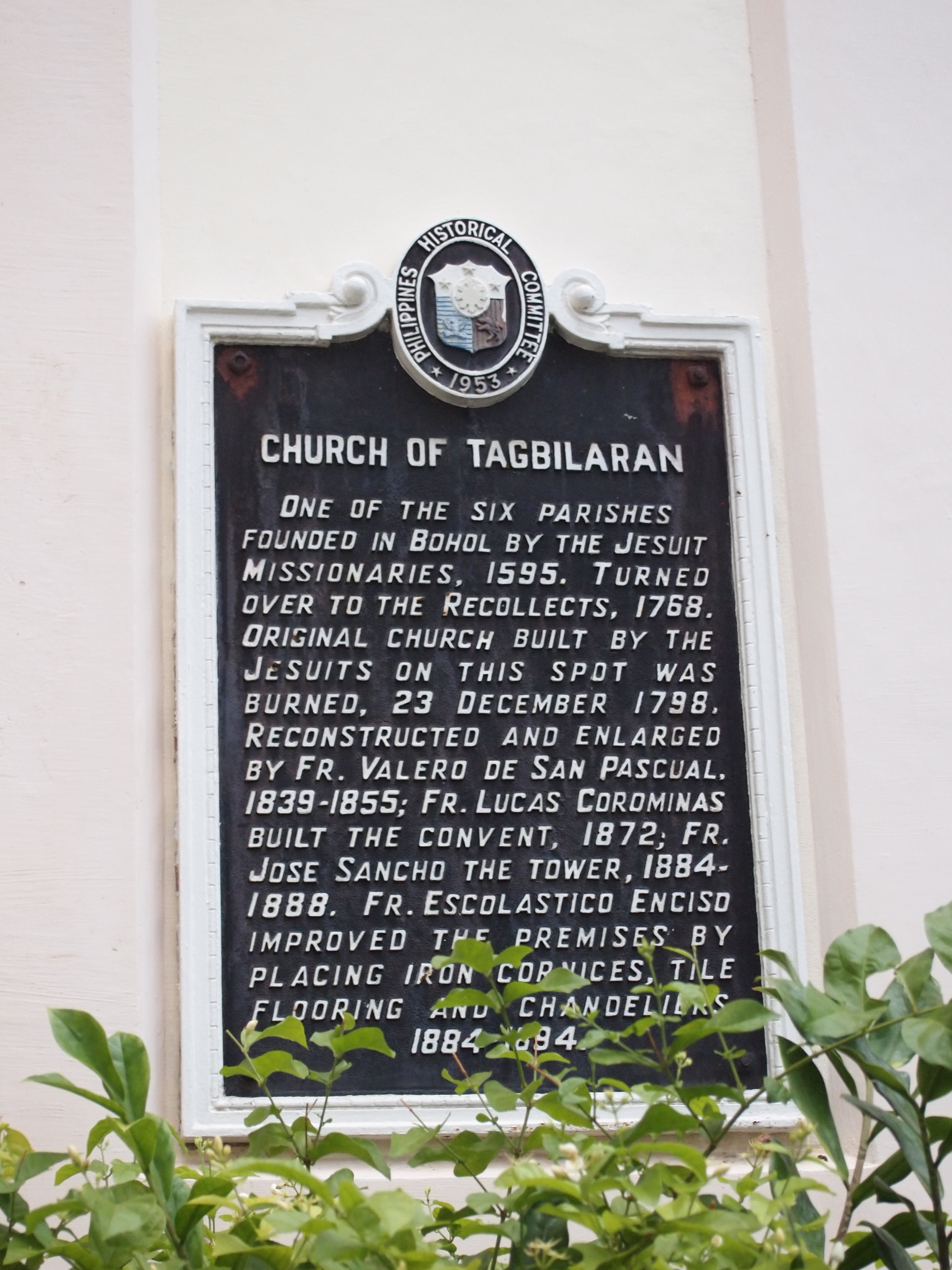
Philippines Historical Committee historical marker installed in 1953

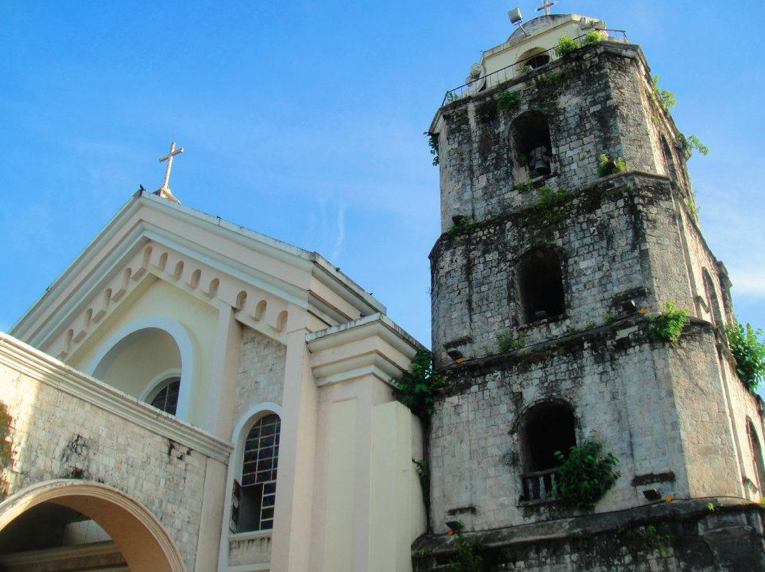
The cathedral's belfry and facade close-up

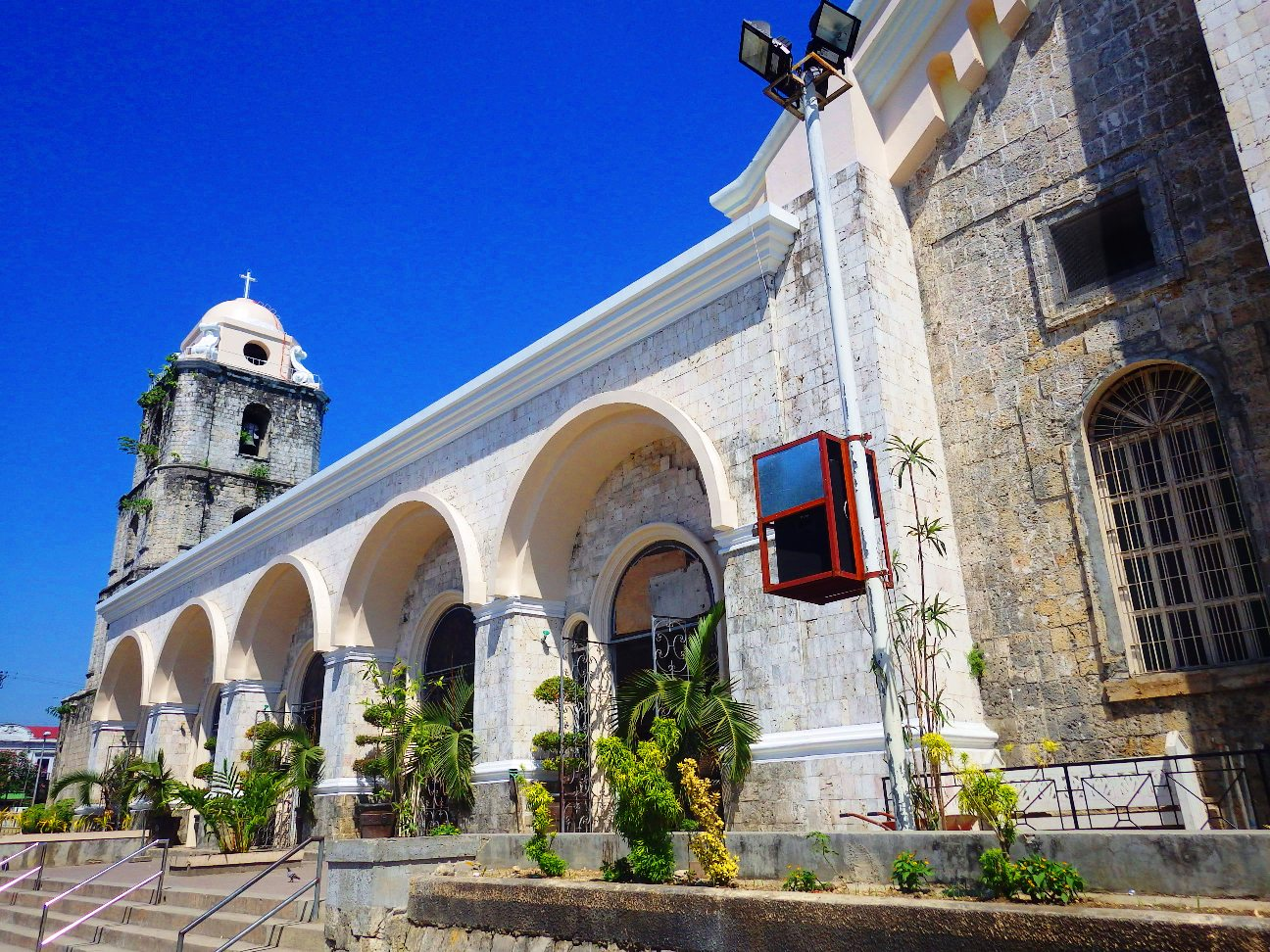
Side entrances of the cathedral

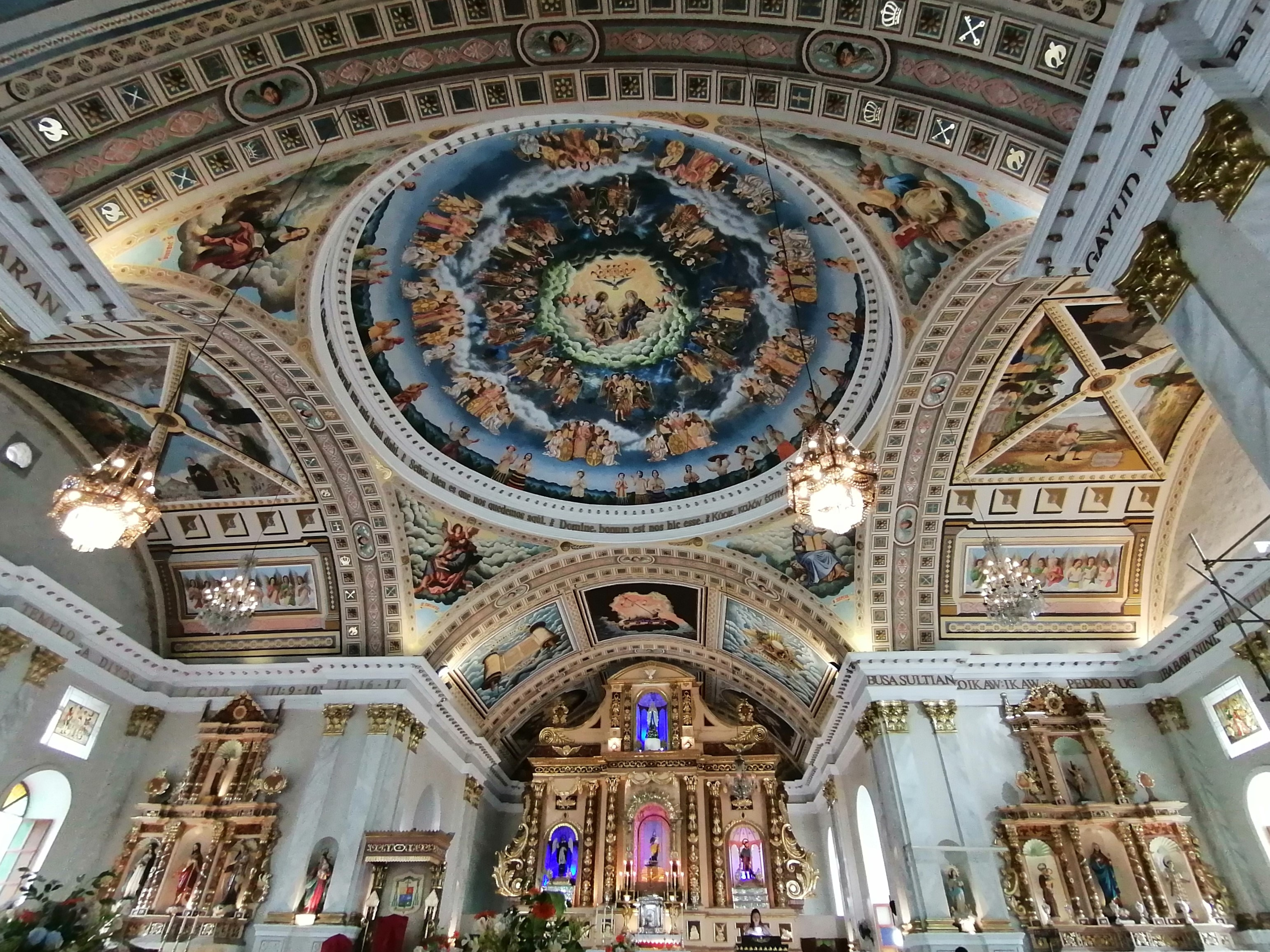
Ceiling paintings above the altar

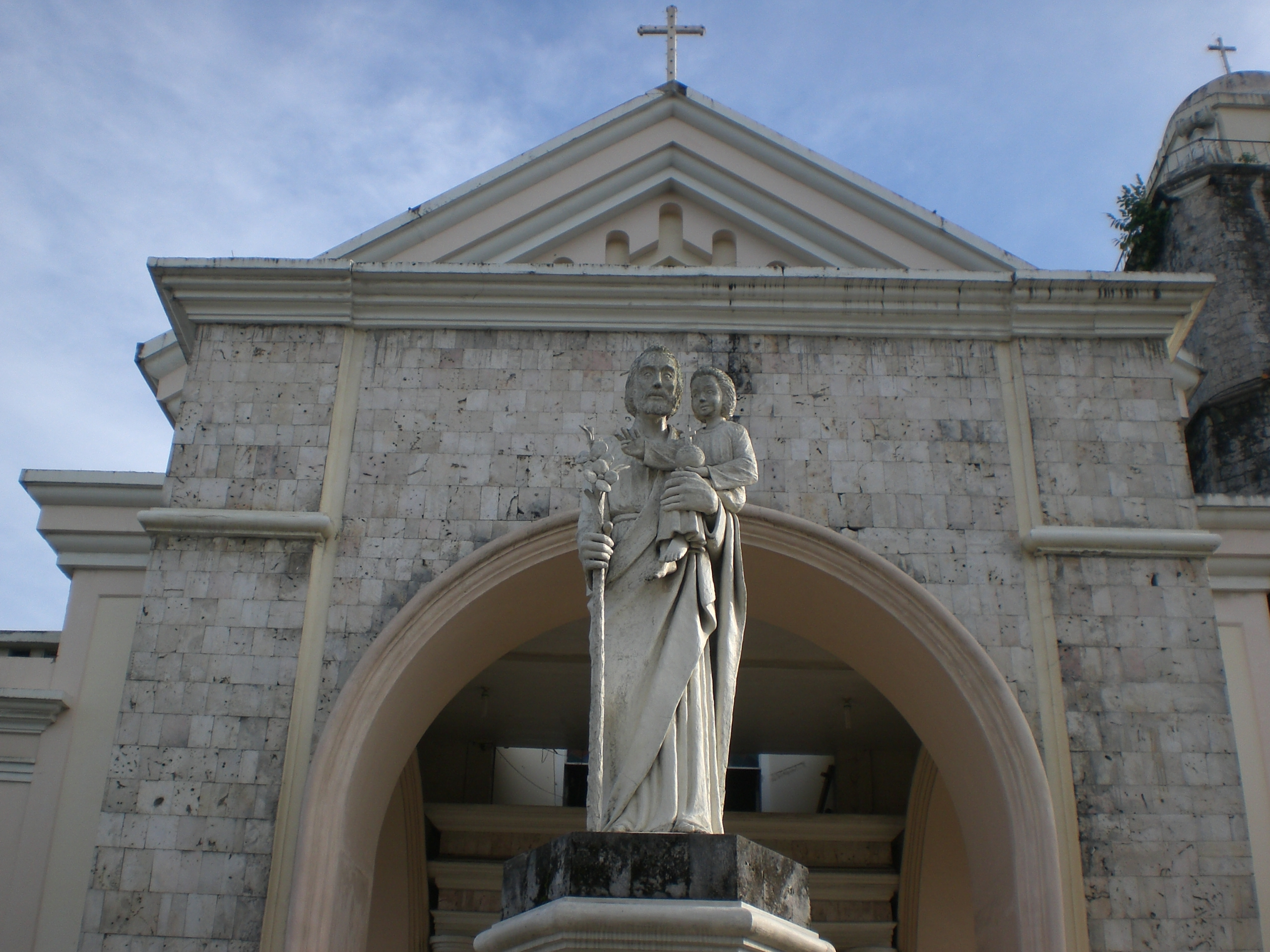
Saint Joseph statue in front of the cathedral

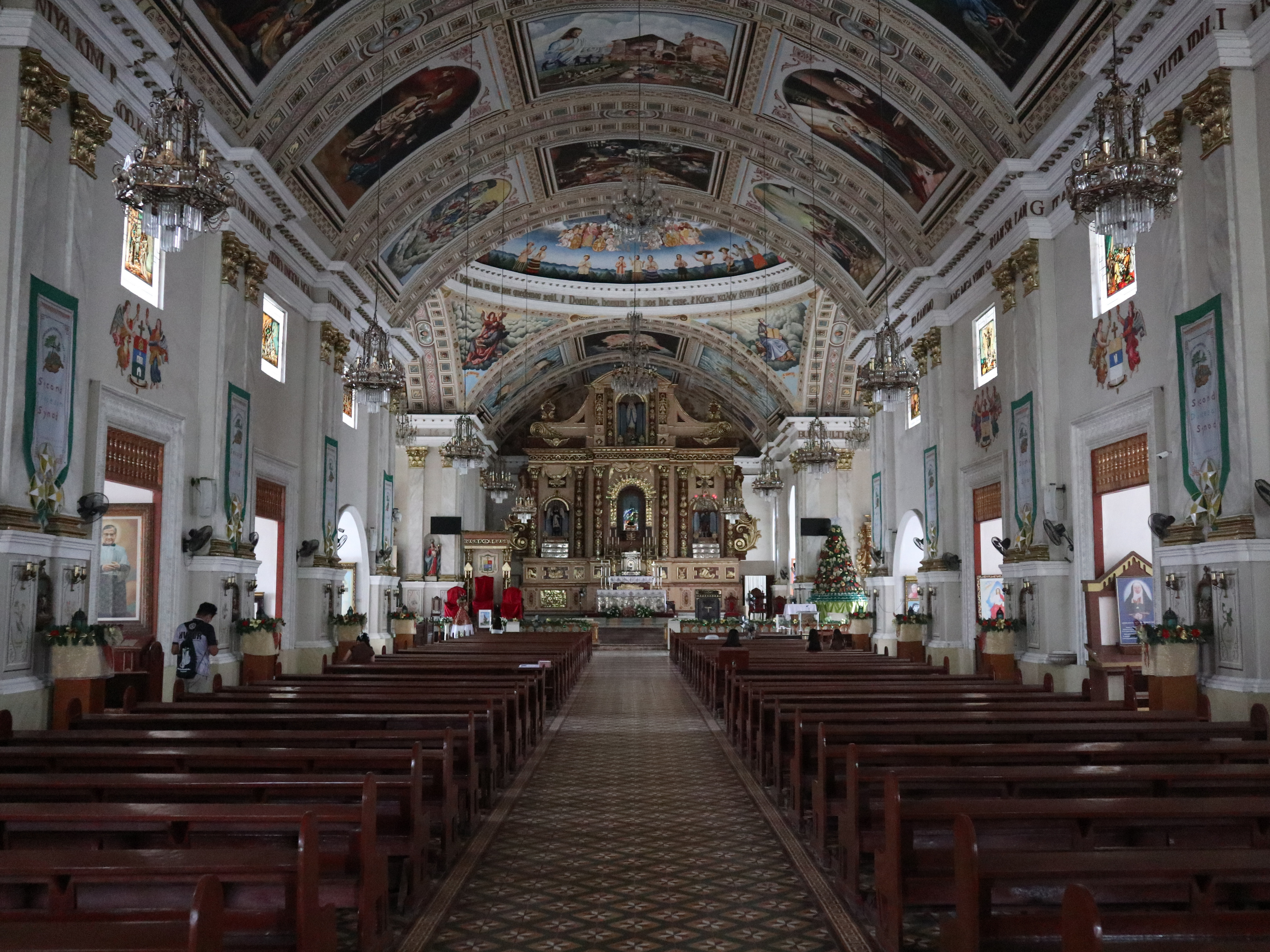
The cathedral's nave in 2023

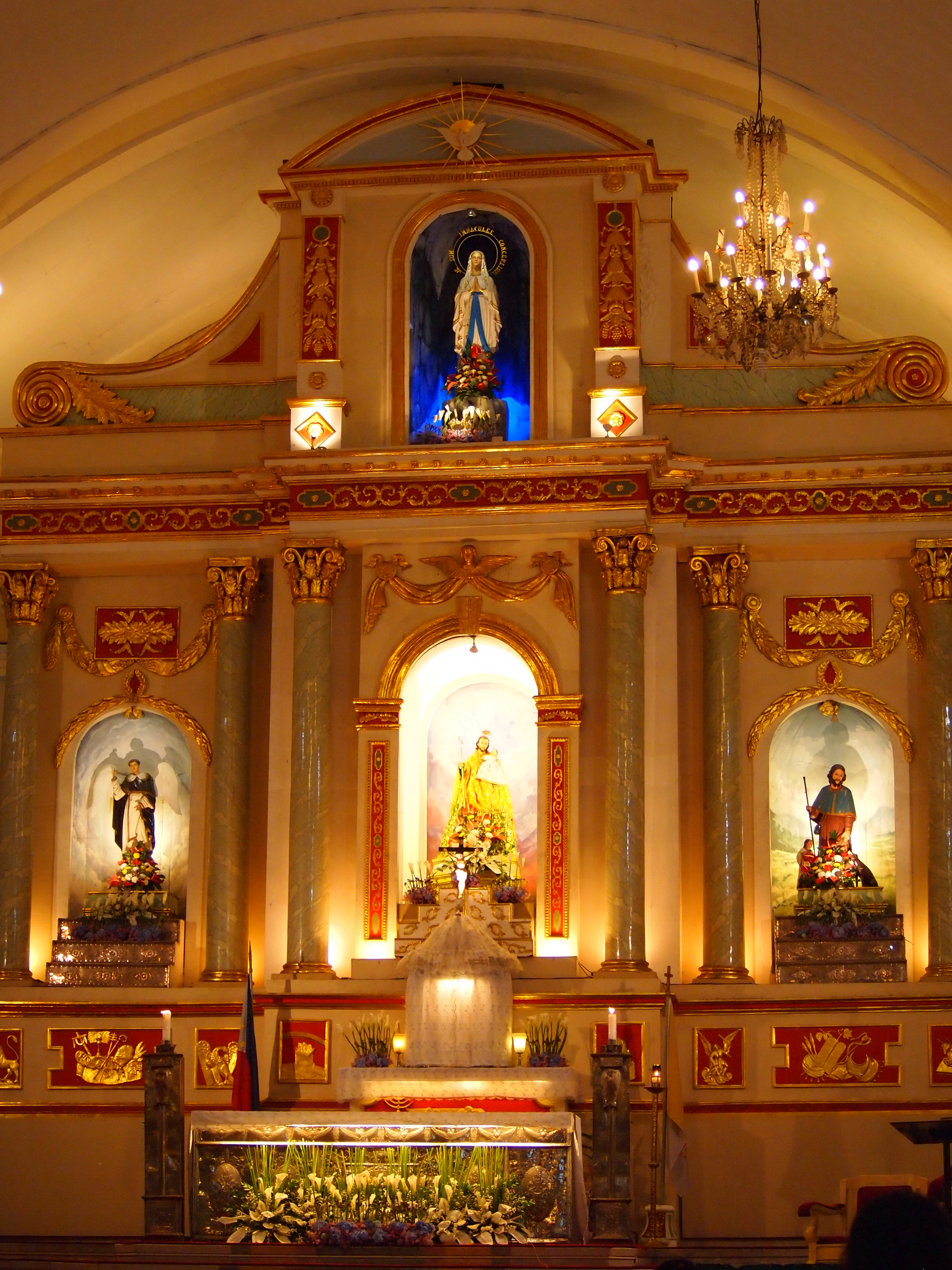
Main altar (retablo mayor)

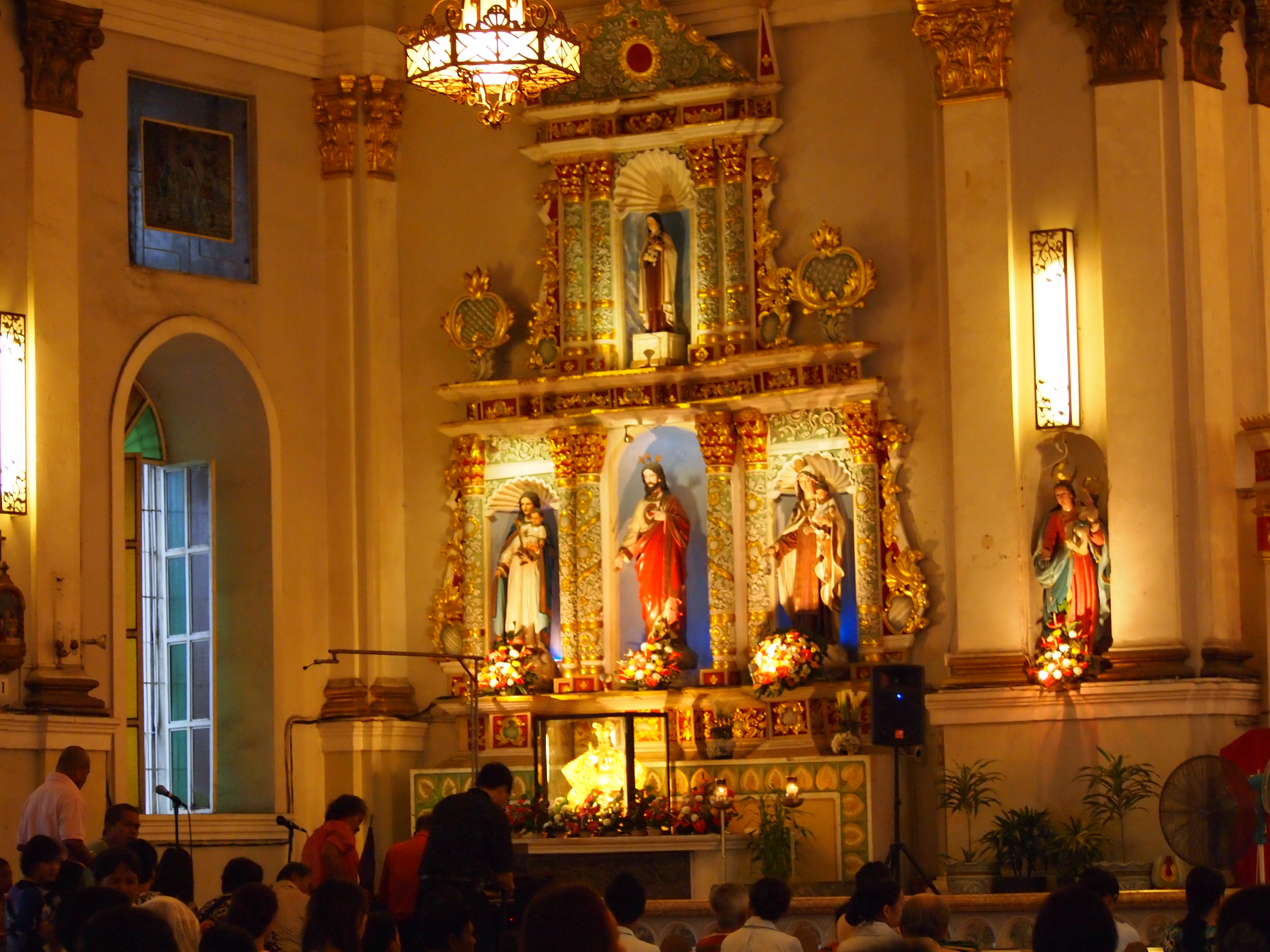
Right side altar
