= Cabancalan =

Cabancalan may refer to the following places in the Philippines:

- Cabancalan, Mandaue
- Cabancalan, Sevilla, Bohol

== See also ==
- Kabankalan, Philippines
