= Diocese of Tagbilaran =

Latin Catholic diocese in the Philippines

Diocese of Tagbilaran Dioecesis Tagbilaranus Diyosesis sa Tagbilaran

Catholic
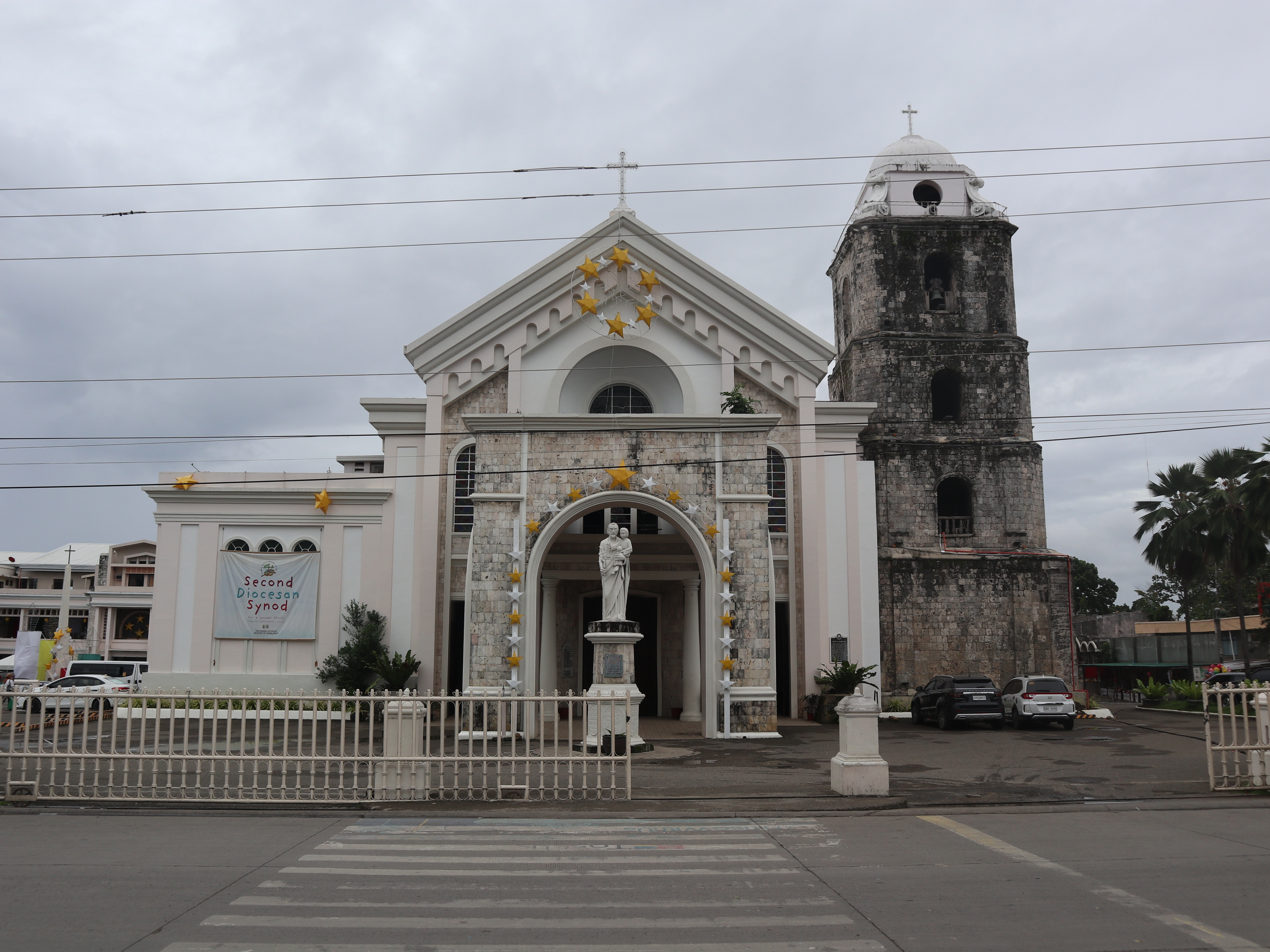
- Tagbilaran Cathedral

- Coat of arms

Location
- Country: Philippines
- Territory: Western Bohol (Alburquerque, Antequera, Baclayon, Balilihan, Batuan, Bilar, Calape, Catigbian, Clarin, Corella, Cortes, Dauis, Dimiao, Garcia Hernandez, Lila, Loay, Loboc, Loon, Maribojoc, Panglao, Sagbayan, San Isidro, Sevilla, Sikatuna, Tagbilaran, Tubigon, Valencia)
- Episcopal conference: Catholic Bishops' Conference of the Philippines
- Ecclesiastical province: Cebu
- Metropolitan: Cebu
- Deaneries: 8
- Coordinates: 9°38′22″N 123°51′21″E

Statistics
- Area: 1,734 km^{2} (670 sq mi)
- Population: Total; Catholics: (as of 2023); ▼748,916; ▼705,898 (▲94.3%)
- Parishes: ▲60 (2023)

Information
- Denomination: Catholic
- Sui iuris church: Latin Church
- Rite: Roman Rite
- Established: November 8, 1941 (84 years ago)
- Cathedral: Diocesan Shrine and Cathedral-Parish of Saint Joseph the Worker
- Patron saint: Saint Joseph; Saint Roch
- Secular priests: ▲126, plus ▲68 religious priests (2023)

Current leadership
- Pope: Leo XIV
- Bishop: Crispin Varquez
- Metropolitan Archbishop: Alberto Sy Uy
- Bishops emeritus: Leonardo Y. Medroso

Website
- rcdt.ph

The Diocese of Tagbilaran is a Latin Catholic diocese of the Catholic Church in the Philippines, headquartered in Tagbilaran City. It is one of two dioceses in the national province of Bohol, the other being the Diocese of Talibon. Both dioceses are suffragan to the Archdiocese of Cebu.

== History ==
Former coat of arms of the Diocese of Tagbilaran, used from 1951 to 1986.

The Diocese of Tagbilaran was created on November 8, 1941, and made a suffragan of the Archdiocese of Cebu by the apostolic constitution In sublimi Petri cathedra. But due to the complications caused by World War II, its first bishop, Julio Rosales, a priest of the Diocese of Palo took possession of the diocese after his episcopal consecration five years after Tagbilaran's erection.

On January 9, 1986, the diocese lost half of its territory after Pope John Paul II created the Diocese of Talibon, with its seat in Talibon, a major town on the northern coast of the island. The Diocese of Talibon absorbed half of the civil province of Bohol.

On March 25, 2026, Pope Leo XIV appointed Fr. Gerardo Saco Jr. who was then serving as the diocesan administrator, to become the 8th Bishop of Tagbilaran. His appointment followed a period of vacancy, after Bishop Alberto Uy was appointed as Archbishop of Cebu.

However, on May 5, 2026, less than a month before his scheduled episcopal ordination he announced that he would no longer proceed with the appointment. In an official statement, he cited a "change of heart" reached after a period of intense prayer and spiritual discernment adding that it was rooted in a deep awareness of his “human limitation and inadequacies.

Four months after Saco withdrew his appointment, Pope Leo XIV appointed Sevilla, Bohol-born Crispin Varquez as bishop on September 10, 2026, returning him to the diocese where he was ordained a priest. He was canonically installed as the 8th Bishop of Tagbilaran and took solemn possession of the diocese on October 27, 2026, in the presence of the Apostolic Nuncio, Most Rev. Charles John Brown, and the Archbishop of Cebu (and formerly the 7th Bishop of Tagbilaran), Most Rev. Alberto Uy.

== Bishops of Tagbilaran ==
No.	Bishop	Period in office	Notes	Coat of arms
1	Julio Rosales	June 22, 1946 – December 17, 1949 (3 years, 178 days)	Appointed Archbishop of Cebu	
2	Manuel M. Mascariñas	November 12, 1951 – July 3, 1976 (24 years, 234 days)	Retired from office	
3	Onesimo Cadiz Gordoncillo	July 3, 1976 – June 18, 1986 (9 years, 350 days)	Appointed Archbishop of Capiz	
4	Felix S. Zafra	December 2, 1986 – April 21, 1992 (5 years, 141 days)	Retired from office	
5	Leopoldo S. Tumulak	November 28, 1992 – January 15, 2005 (12 years, 48 days)	Appointed Military Ordinary of the Philippines	
6	Leonardo Y. Medroso	December 14, 2006 – October 13, 2016 (9 years, 304 days)	Retired from office	
7	Alberto S. Uy	January 6, 2017 – July 16, 2025 (8 years, 191 days)	Appointed Archbishop of Cebu	
-	Gerardo F. Saco Jr.(Bishop-elect)	March 25, 2026 - May 5, 2026 (41 days)	Withdrew prior to ordination	
8	Crispin B. Varquez	October 27, 2026 – present (0 days)		

== See also ==
- Immaculate Heart of Mary Seminary
- List of Catholic dioceses in the Philippines
