= Cebu–Bohol Bridge =

- Coordinates: 10°09′N 124°05′E
- Crosses: Cebu Strait
- Locale: Cebu and Bohol, Philippines

Characteristics
- Total length: 25 km (82,000 ft)
- Traversable?: Yes

History
- Built: TBA
- Construction cost: ₱90 billion

Location
- Interactive map of Cebu–Bohol Bridge

The Cebu–Bohol Bridge is a proposed bridge which will connect the island provinces of Cebu and Bohol in the Philippines. The construction cost is estimated to be around ₱90 billion.

== History ==
=== Cebu-Bohol Friendship Bridge ===
The bridge was proposed back in mid-2016. It is one of the listed projects in Duterte's Build! Build! Build! and, later, Bongbong Marcos' Build Better More infrastructure programs. The National Economic Development Authority (NEDA) made a proposal to connect the two provinces from Cebu City to Jetafe. The project cost was studied to be around nearly ₱58 billion. The construction was planned to start in 2020. Then after, Director-General Ernesto Pernia, claimed the project to be "impossible" due to technological limitations or "very costly", causing the project to be shelved.

=== Planning ===
The bridge would then be planned by Cebu Governor Gwendolyn Garcia. Garcia would ask Metro Pacific Tollways Corporation (MPTC) Chairman Manuel Pangilinan, to inspect the possibility of building a bridge that will connect Cordova and Bohol. Pangilinan hinted the project cost to be around 90 billion pesos and they would have to find a way to finance the project in order to make it viable and could be raised for the feasibility study. The development would later be announced by Cebu-Cordova Link Expressway Corporation (CCLEC) President Allan Alfon.

==== Reactions ====
In December 2024, Bishop Alberto Uy exhorted his parishioners regarding the current state of infrastructure corruption. He voiced his strong opposition to the planned construction of the Bridge based on environmental protection concerns and possible damage to the Danajon Bank.

== Recent developments ==
In mid‑2025, Cebu Governor Pam Baricuatro renewed calls for expedited implementation of the Cebu–Bohol bridge project. She urged both provincial and national stakeholders to fast‑track feasibility studies and explore public-private partnership (PPP) arrangements to avoid further delays. Baricuatro highlighted that timely action is crucial to leverage economic and tourism synergies between Cebu and Bohol, particularly as the region continues its rapid post-pandemic recovery.
