= Crispin Varquez =

Filipino prelate

The Most Reverend Crispin B. Varquez D.D.
- Bishop of Tagbilaran
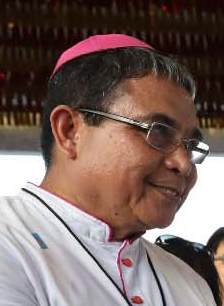
- Varquez in 2018
- Province: Cebu
- Diocese: Tagbilaran
- See: Tagbilaran
- Appointed: September 10, 2026
- Installed: October 27, 2026
- Predecessor: Alberto S. Uy
- Other posts: Vicar General, Diocese of Tagbilaran (2007); Bishop of Borongan (2007–2026)

Orders
- Ordination: April 14, 1989
- Consecration: October 18, 2007 by Leonardo Y. Medroso

Personal details
- Born: Crispin Barrete Varquez; December 5, 1960 (age 65) Sevilla, Bohol, Philippines
- Denomination: Catholicism
- Residence: Tagbilaran, Bohol
- Parents: Sinforiano Varquez (father); Justina Barrete (mother)
- Education: Immaculate Heart of Mary Seminary
- Motto: Humilitas et simplicitas (Latin for 'Humility and simplicity')
- Coat of arms: Crispin B. Varquez's coat of arms

Ordination history
History
Episcopal consecration
- Principal consecrator: Leonardo Y. Medroso
- Co-consecrators: Antonieto Cabajog; Jose S. Palma

Styles of Crispin B. Varquez
- Reference style: His Excellency; The Most Reverend
- Spoken style: Your Excellency
- Religious style: Bishop

Crispin Barrete Varquez (born December 5, 1960) is a Filipino Catholic prelate who is the bishop of Tagbilaran. He previously served as the bishop of Borongan from 2007 to 2026.

== Early life ==
Varquez was born on December 5, 1960, in Sevilla, Bohol, to Sinforiano Varquez and Justina Barrete. He completed a degree in philosophy at the Immaculate Heart of Mary Seminary in Tagbilaran and earned a degree in theology at the St. Augustine Major Seminary in Tagaytay, Cavite.

== Ministry ==
Varquez was ordained to the priesthood on April 14, 1989, at Our Lady of Guadalupe Church in Sevilla. His first assignment was as assistant parish priest in Sablayan, Occidental Mindoro. From the 1990s until 2000, he served as a formator at both the Immaculate Heart of Mary Seminary and St. Augustine Major Seminary. He later served as parish priest in several parishes within the Diocese of Tagbilaran before being appointed as its vicar general in January 2007.

Pope Benedict XVI appointed Varquez as the sixth Bishop of Borongan in Eastern Samar on August 4, 2007. He succeeded Leonardo Y. Medroso, who had been appointed Bishop of Tagbiliran in 2006. Varquez received episcopal consecration on October 18, 2007, and was installed on November 8.

On September 10, 2026, Pope Leo XIV appointed Varquez as the eighth bishop of Tagbilaran, succeeding Alberto S. Uy, who became Archbishop of Cebu in 2025. The appointment followed the withdrawal of bishop-elect Gerardo Saco Jr. in May 2026, four months prior to Varquez's nomination. He was installed as the eighth Bishop of Tagbilaran on October 27, 2026.

Catholic Church titles
Preceded by Leonardo Y. Medroso	Bishop of Borongan; November 8, 2007 – September 10, 2026	Sede vacante
Preceded by Alberto S. Uy	Bishop of Tagbilaran; October 27, 2026 – present	Incumbent
