= Alberto Uy =

Filipino prelate (born 1966)

His Excellency, The Most Reverend Alberto Uy DD, STD
- Metropolitan Archbishop of Cebu
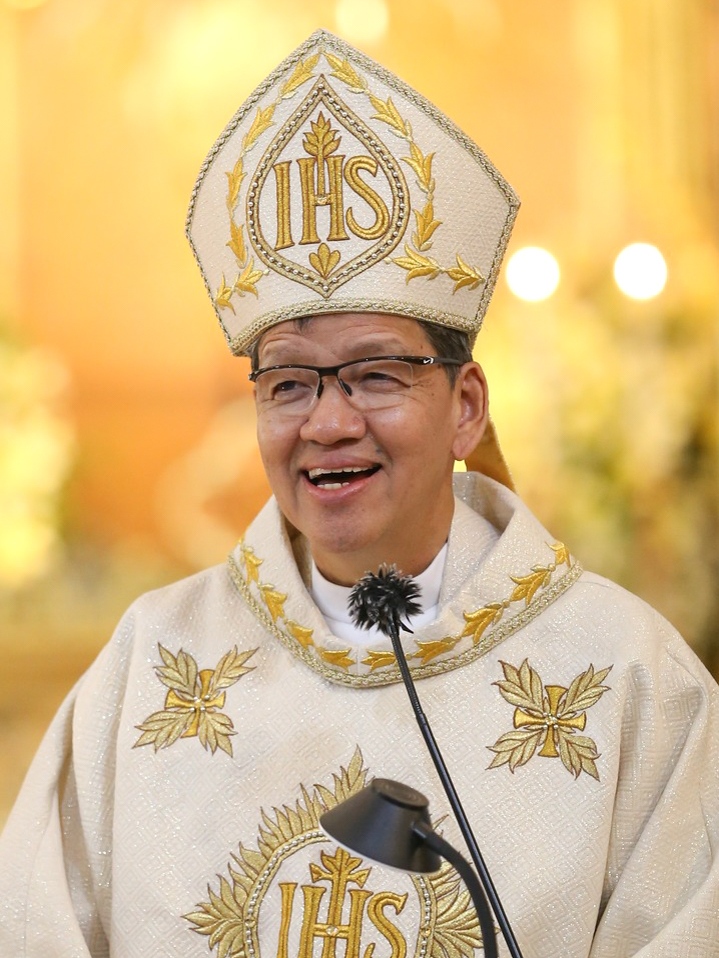
- Uy at his installation Mass at the Cebu Metropolitan Cathedral in September 2025
- Province: Cebu
- Appointed: July 16, 2025
- Installed: September 30, 2025
- Predecessor: Jose S. Palma
- Previous post: Bishop of Tagbilaran (2017–2025)

Orders
- Ordination: April 14, 1993 by Christian Vicente Noel
- Consecration: January 5, 2017 by Luis Antonio Tagle

Personal details
- Born: Alberto Sy Uy; October 18, 1966 (age 60) Ubay, Bohol, Philippines
- Denomination: Roman Catholic
- Education: Immaculate Heart of Mary Seminary; St. John Vianney Theological Seminary, Cagayan de Oro; Loyola School of Theology; Pontifical Gregorian University
- Motto: Omnia facio propter Evangelium (Latin for 'I do everything for the sake of the Gospel') (Note: From 1 Corinthians 9:23)
- Coat of arms: Alberto Uy's coat of arms

Ordination history
History
Priestly ordination
- Ordained by: Christian Vicente Noel
- Date: April 14, 1993
Episcopal consecration
- Principal consecrator: Luis Antonio Tagle
- Co-consecrators: Jose S. Palma; Daniel Parcon
- Place: Talibon Cathedral

Styles of Alberto Uy
- Reference style: His Excellency; The Most Reverend
- Spoken style: Your Excellency
- Religious style: Archbishop

Alberto "Abet" Sy Uy (born October 18, 1966) is a Filipino Roman Catholic prelate. He is the metropolitan archbishop of Cebu in the Philippines, having been appointed by Pope Leo XIV on July 16, 2025.

== Early life and education ==
Uy was born on October 18, 1966, in Ubay, Bohol. He studied philosophy at the Immaculate Heart of Mary Seminary in Tagbilaran and theology at the Saint John Mary Vianney Theological Seminary in Cagayan de Oro, where he also received a master's degree in Pastoral Ministry. He received his licentiate in sacred theology at the Loyola School of Theology in Quezon City. He pursued further studies at the Pontifical Gregorian University in Rome, where he received a doctorate in sacred theology in 2006.

== Ministry ==
=== Priesthood ===
Uy was ordained a priest on April 14, 1993, for the Diocese of Talibon. He then served as parochial vicar of the parish church in Jagna until 1995 before he became dean of seminarians at the Immaculate Heart of Mary Seminary until 1997. After completing his doctoral studies in Rome, he became rector of the Saint John Mary Vianney Theological Seminary in Cagayan de Oro from 2006 to 2010 before returning to Jagna to serve as its parish priest. From 2013 to 2016, he served as parish priest of Talibon Cathedral, and at the same time, the diocese's episcopal vicar for the clergy.

=== Episcopate ===
==== Bishop of Tagbilaran ====
Pope Francis appointed Uy as the seventh Bishop of Tagbilaran on October 13, 2016, succeeding Leonardo Y. Medroso. Uy was consecrated bishop at the Blessed Trinity Cathedral in Talibon, Bohol, seat of the Diocese of Talibon. The next day, he was installed at Cathedral of St. Joseph the Worker in Tagbilaran City. He succeeded retired bishop Leonardo Y. Medroso.

In May 2024, Uy, in an open letter, praised Bohol Representatives Edgar Chatto, Ma. Vanessa C. Aumentado and Alexie Tutor for their “courageous stance” in voting negative versus the divorce bill. In December, Uy exhorted his parishioners regarding the current state of infrastructure corruption. He voiced his strong opposition to the planned construction of the Cebu–Bohol Bridge based on environmental protection concerns and possible damage to the Danajon Bank.

==== Archbishop of Cebu ====
On July 16, 2025, Pope Leo XIV appointed him Metropolitan Archbishop of Cebu, succeeding José S. Palma. He was installed on September 30 by Archbishop Charles John Brown, apostolic nuncio to the Philippines, at the Cebu Metropolitan Cathedral. Uy's installation Mass was also concelebrated by Cardinal Luis Antonio Tagle, his principal consecrator during his episcopal ordination, together with two other Filipino Cardinals, Jose Advincula of the Archdiocese of Manila, and Pablo Virgilio David of the Diocese of Kalookan.

On October 1, 2025, a day after his installation, he immediately visited the churches and parishes including the Daanbantayan Church in northern Cebu which were severely affected by the earthquake, which happened just a few hours after his installation Mass. He appealed for aid for the people in quake-stricken areas, and also ordered the parishes there to refrain from using the churches for masses, amid safety concerns.

Uy and fellow Filipino metropolitan archbishops David William Antonio of Nueva Segovia and Charlie Inzon of Cotabato received the pallium from Pope Leo at St. Peter's Basilica on June 29, 2026, the Solemnity of Saints Peter and Paul.

== Notes ==
Catholic Church titles
Preceded by Leonardo Y. Medroso	Bishop of Tagbilaran; January 5, 2017 – September 30, 2025	Succeeded by Crispin B. Varquez
Preceded by Jose S. Palma	Archbishop of Cebu; September 30, 2025 – present	Incumbent
