= Sevilla, Bohol =

Municipality in Bohol, Philippines

Sevilla
- Municipality
- Municipality of Sevilla
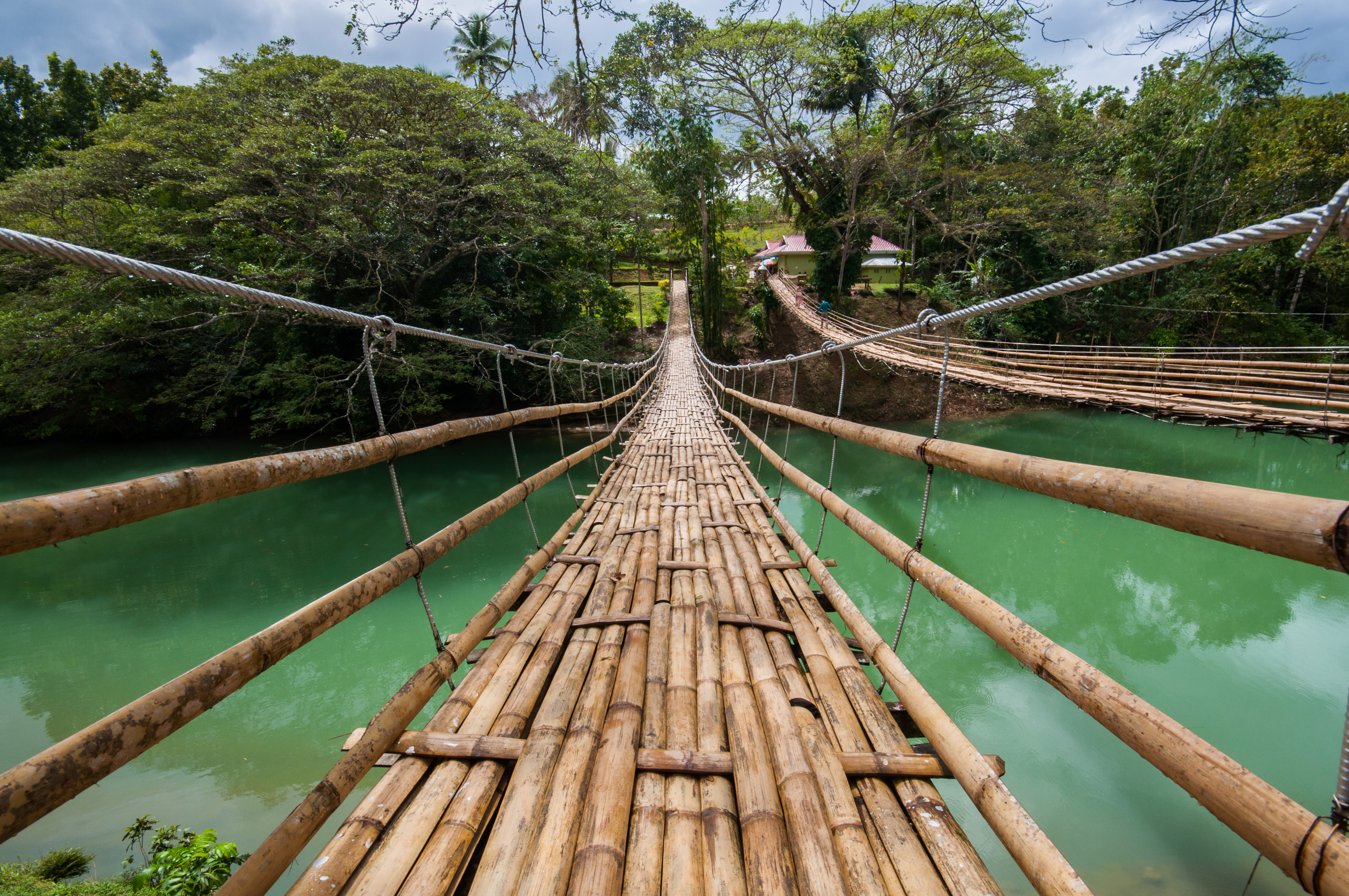
- Sipatan Twin Hanging Bridge

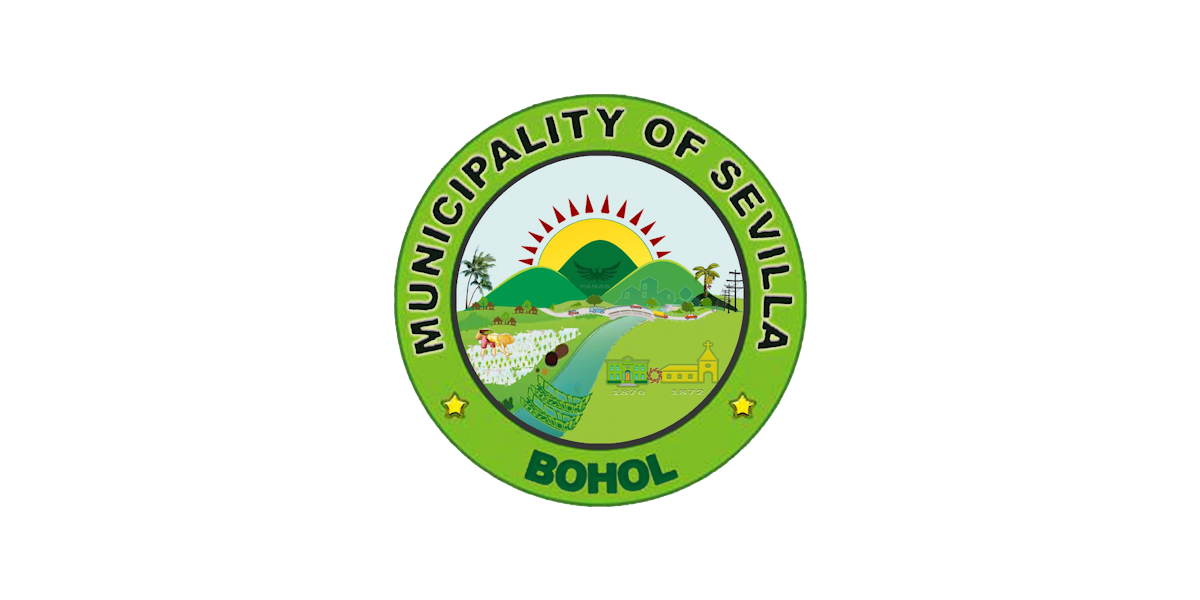
- Flag

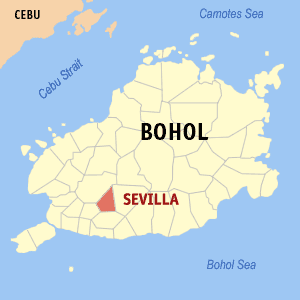
- Map of Bohol with Sevilla highlighted
- Interactive map of Sevilla
- Location within the Philippines
- Coordinates: 9°42′N 124°03′E
- Country: Philippines
- Region: Central Visayas
- Province: Bohol
- District: 3rd district
- Founded: 1872
- Barangays: 13 (see Barangays)

Government
  - Type: Sangguniang Bayan
  - Mayor: Juliet Bucag-Dano
  - Vice Mayor: Richard B. Bucag
  - Representative: Kristine Alexie B. Tutor
  - Municipal Council: Members: Rolan C. Pacatang; Venia C. Cutin; Devora M. Calacar; Jef Ryan S. Cabagnot; Leonida B. Reblinca; Camilo L. Lagrosa; Geny F. Calamba; Marcelita A. Adolfo
  - Electorate: 8,236 voters (2025)

Area
  - Total: 64.55 km^{2} (24.92 sq mi)
- Elevation: 174 m (571 ft)
- Highest elevation: 464 m (1,522 ft)
- Lowest elevation: 35 m (115 ft)

Population (2024 census)
  - Total: 11,425
  - Density: 177.0/km^{2} (458.4/sq mi)
  - Households: 2,523

Economy
  - Income class: 4th municipal income class
  - Poverty incidence: 21.41% (2023)
  - Revenue: ₱ 117.7 million (2024)
  - Assets: ₱ 483.9 million (2024)
  - Expenditure: ₱ 33.29 million (2024)
  - Liabilities: ₱ 72.35 million (2024)

Service provider
  - Electricity: Bohol 1 Electric Cooperative (BOHECO 1)
- Time zone: UTC+8 (PST)
- ZIP code: 6347
- PSGC: 071239000
- IDD : area code: +63 (0)38
- Native languages: Boholano dialect Cebuano; Tagalog

Sevilla, officially the Municipality of Sevilla (Cebuano: Munisipalidad sa Sevilla; Tagalog: Bayan ng Sevilla), is a municipality in the province of Bohol, Philippines. According to the 2024 census, it has a population of 11,376 people.

Sevilla is 30 kilometres (19 mi) from Tagbilaran.

Sevilla celebrates its fiesta on December 12, in honor of the patron saint Our Lady of Guadalupe.

== Geography ==
=== Barangays ===
Sevilla politically subdivided into 13 barangays. Each barangay consists of puroks and some have sitios.

PSGC	Barangay	Population			±% p.a.	
		2024		2010		
071239001	Bayawahan	7.8%	886	877	▴	0.07%
071239002	Cabancalan	6.3%	716	705	▴	0.11%
071239003	Calinga‑an	5.6%	636	592	▴	0.50%
071239004	Calinginan Norte	6.4%	734	779	▾	−0.41%
071239005	Calinginan Sur	5.2%	593	594	▾	−0.01%
071239006	Cambagui	9.5%	1,082	1,033	▴	0.32%
071239008	Ewon	7.0%	804	738	▴	0.60%
071239009	Guinob‑an	6.0%	683	609	▴	0.80%
071239010	Lagtangan	6.2%	712	712	Steady	0.00%
071239011	Licolico	7.6%	871	854	▴	0.14%
071239012	Lobgob	7.0%	797	791	▴	0.05%
071239013	Magsaysay	10.9%	1,244	1,193	▴	0.29%
071239014	Poblacion	7.9%	903	966	▾	−0.47%
	Total		11,425	10,443	▴	0.63%

=== Climate ===
Climate data for Sevilla, Bohol
Month	Jan	Feb	Mar	Apr	May	Jun	Jul	Aug	Sep	Oct	Nov	Dec	Year
Mean daily maximum °C (°F)	28 (82)	28 (82)	29 (84)	31 (88)	31 (88)	30 (86)	29 (84)	29 (84)	29 (84)	29 (84)	28 (82)	28 (82)	29 (84)
Mean daily minimum °C (°F)	22 (72)	22 (72)	22 (72)	23 (73)	24 (75)	24 (75)	24 (75)	24 (75)	24 (75)	23 (73)	23 (73)	22 (72)	23 (74)
Average precipitation mm (inches)	102 (4.0)	85 (3.3)	91 (3.6)	75 (3.0)	110 (4.3)	141 (5.6)	121 (4.8)	107 (4.2)	111 (4.4)	144 (5.7)	169 (6.7)	139 (5.5)	1,395 (55.1)
Average rainy days	18.6	14.8	16.5	16.7	23.9	26.4	25.6	24.1	24.4	26.3	23.7	20.5	261.5
Source: Meteoblue

== Demographics ==
Population census of Sevilla

Year	Pop.	±% p.a.
1903	5,698	—
1918	6,216	+0.58%
1939	7,347	+0.80%
1948	7,949	+0.88%
1960	7,130	−0.90%
1970	7,997	+1.15%

Year	Pop.	±% p.a.
1975	8,551	+1.35%
1980	9,073	+1.19%
1990	9,165	+0.10%
1995	8,671	−1.03%
2000	10,281	+3.72%
2007	11,289	+1.30%

Year	Pop.	±% p.a.
2010	10,443	−2.79%
2015	10,661	+0.39%
2020	11,376	+1.38%
2024	11,425	+0.10%

Source: Philippine Statistics Authority

== Economy ==
Poverty incidence of Sevilla (%)

Source: Philippine Statistics Authority
