= Alburquerque, Bohol =

Municipality in Bohol, Philippines

Alburquerque
- Municipality
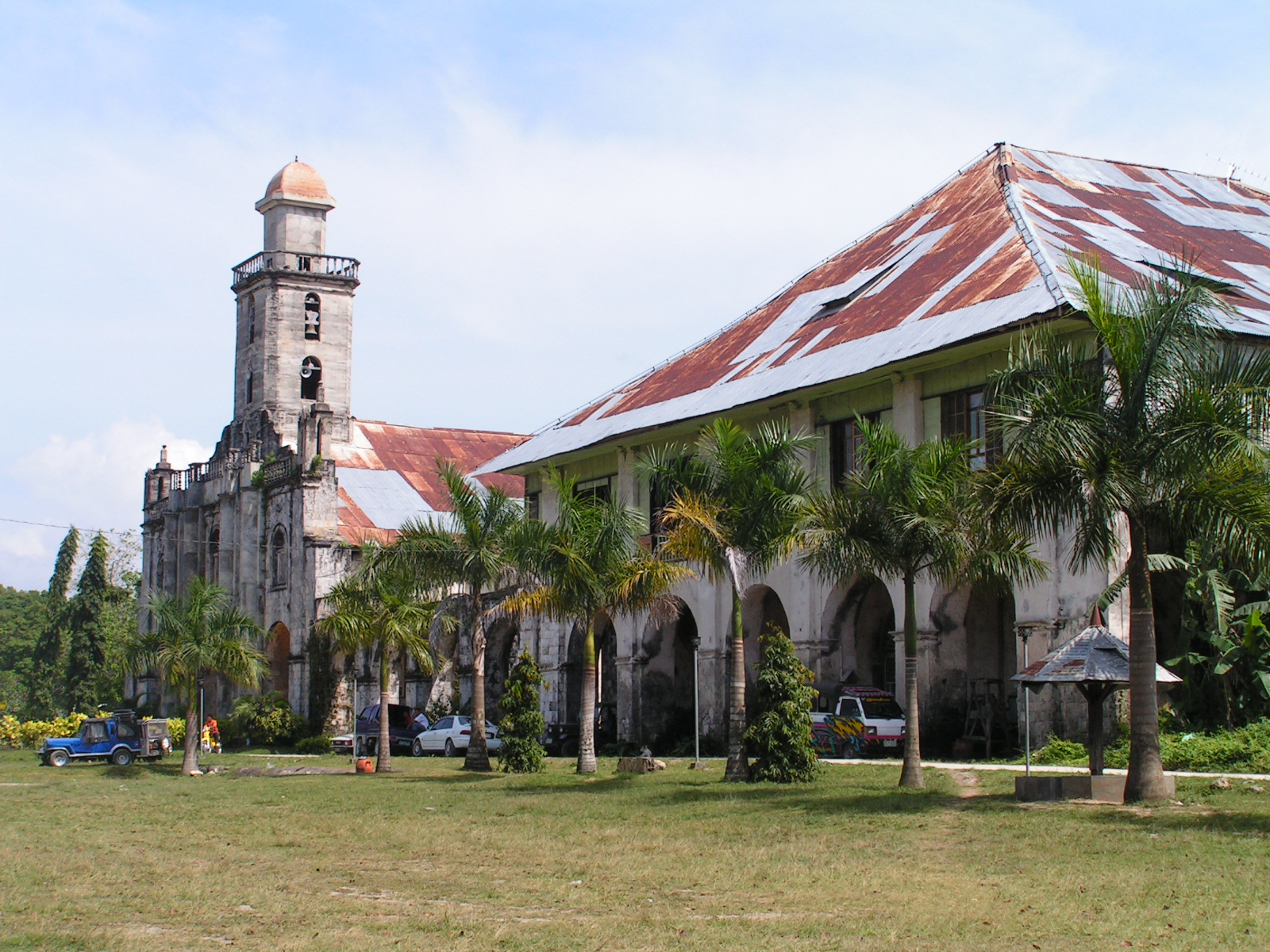
- Sta Monica church

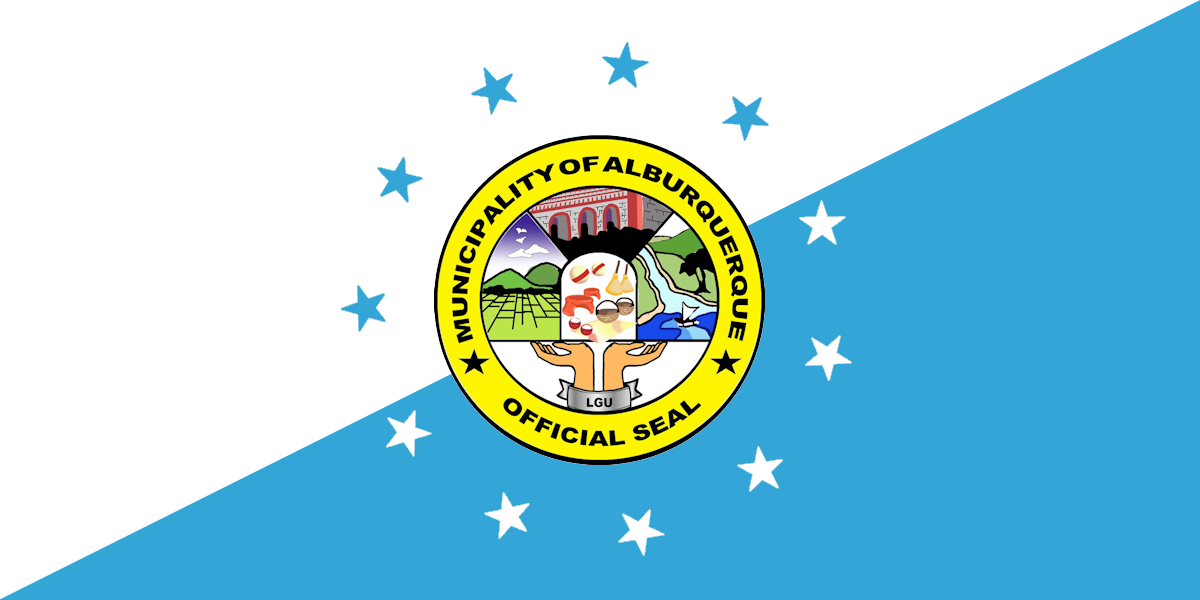
- Flag

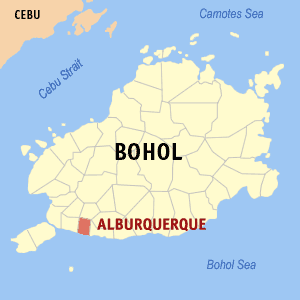
- Map of Bohol with Alburquerque highlighted
- Interactive map of Alburquerque
- Location within the Philippines
- Coordinates: 9°36′38″N 123°57′18″E
- Country: Philippines
- Region: Central Visayas
- Province: Bohol
- District: 1st district
- Founded: 9 June 1868
- Barangays: 11 (see Barangays)

Government
  - Type: Sangguniang Bayan
  - Mayor: Don Ritchie P. Buates
  - Vice Mayor: Dagohoy N. Samar
  - Representative: John Geesnell Yap
  - Municipal Council: Members: Jessica B. Doria; Voltaire R. Buates; Alex S. Andoy; Kien Alphe M. Garsuta; Eleanor V. Balo; Jose M. Dompol; Adriana B. Milo; Michael B. Mantiza
  - Electorate: 8,039 voters (2025)

Area
  - Total: 26.98 km^{2} (10.42 sq mi)
- Elevation: 42 m (138 ft)
- Highest elevation: 272 m (892 ft)
- Lowest elevation: 0 m (0 ft)

Population (2024 census)
  - Total: 11,489
  - Density: 425.8/km^{2} (1,103/sq mi)
  - Households: 2,589
- Demonyms: Alburanon; Alburquerqueño

Economy
  - Income class: 4th municipal income class
  - Poverty incidence: 15.64% (2023)
  - Revenue: ₱ 239.2 million (2024)
  - Assets: ₱ 422 million (2024)
  - Expenditure: ₱ 100.3 million (2024)
  - Liabilities: ₱ 86.47 million (2024)

Service provider
  - Electricity: Bohol 1 Electric Cooperative (BOHECO 1)
- Time zone: UTC+8 (PST)
- ZIP code: 6302
- PSGC: 071201000
- IDD : area code: +63 (0)38
- Native languages: Boholano dialect Cebuano; Tagalog
- Patron saint: St. Monica
- Website: www.alburq.gov.ph

Alburquerque, officially the Municipality of Alburquerque (/ˈælbɜːrˌkɜːrki/ AL-bur-ker-ke; Cebuano: Munisipalidad sa Alburquerque; Tagalog: Bayan ng Alburquerque), is a municipality in the province of Bohol, Philippines. It had a population of 11,489 people at the time of the 2024 census.

The town is colloquially known as "Albur" for short.

Formerly, Alburquerque had one of the longest and heaviest pythons in captivity, with a length of 23 ft (7.0 m), weighing 620 lb (280 kg) and with a girth of 34 in (860 mm). This female python died in 2013, but the mounted creature is still exhibited.

== Etymology ==
- The town was formerly called "Sagunto", but according to the research of Jess Tirol of Bohol, it was called "Segunto".
- Local folklore holds that Alburquerque was named in honour of Afonso de Albuquerque, the famous Portuguese seafarer and conqueror of Malacca, Sumatra, though it might be odd to use a Portuguese name as a name of a place which is under Spanish control.
- The name Alburquerque, which comes from either albus querqus ("white oak" in Latin) or Abu-al-Qurq ("country of cork oaks" in Arabic), is very widespread in all of the Americas and the Philippines.

Since then, Segunto was changed to Alburquerque and its inhabitants are called Alburanons (Alburquerqueños in Spanish, Alburquerqueans in English).

== History ==
In 1842, Lady Mariona Iraq asked for a chapel, convent and school to be built in Lo-oc. The construction of these structures gave way to the establishment of Lo-oc as a barrio under the civil and religious jurisdiction of Baclayon and it was renamed Segunto after a town in Cataluña, Spain. In 1868, the town was renamed to Alburquerque.

== Geography ==
Alburquerque is located in the western part of Bohol, 12 kilometres (7.5 mi) from Tagbilaran. The town has a total land area of 2,865 ha (7,080 acres) which is relatively mild rolling to rolling and hilly. The land is used as built-up area 216.5 ha (535 acres), agricultural purposes 2,511 ha (6,200 acres), timberland 15 ha (37 acres), mining/quarrying 44.3 ha (109 acres), roads 72.3 ha (179 acres), and landfill site 5 ha (12 acres).

=== Physiography ===
The central part of municipality, from the east extending toward northwest is characterized by rolling to moderately steep terrain (18-30% slope), with ground elevation ranging from 80 to 131 m (262 to 430 ft) amsl. The area in northeastern and southwestern part is characterized by steep terrain (30–50% slope), with ground elevation up to 153 m (502 ft) amsl. The southeastern part is characterized with undulating to rolling terrain (8–18% slope) with ground elevation up to 60 m (200 ft) amsl. The area along the coast is characterized by level to nearly level terrain (0-3% slope), with ground elevation ranging from zero near the coast to 10 m (33 ft) amsl inland.

Alburquerque municipality is covered by hydrosol and three sorts of clay namely, faraon, bolinao and lugo clay. The northern portion of municipality is covered mostly by lugo clay, the southern half portion is mostly covered by faraon and bolinao clay, while hydrosol has a very limited extent along the coast. The municipal area is covered by grassland, coconut, shrubs and built-up area. The northern portion is mostly covered with grass, with exception of small area in the northeast, which is covered with shrubs. The southern portion along the coast is covered with coconut, with a small built-up area in the west.

The whole of Bohol is in Coronas climate type IV, characterized by rainfall evenly distributed over the year. The average annual rainfall is estimated at 1,627 mm (64.1 in) per year. The average annual rainfall is the sum of the average annual rainfall from respective river basin, multiplied with percentage of respective municipal area within respective river basin.

=== Rivers and river basins ===
Several small rivers and creeks, which have their headwaters in the elevated terrain in the northern part, traverse the Alburquerque municipality. These rivers and creeks generally flow in a north to south direction and drain the major part of municipality into Bohol Sea. The only major river basin is the Tagbuane River Basin situated on the eastern part of Alburquerque (19.94 km^{2} (7.70 sq mi) or 94.64% of municipal area). The municipality of Albuquerque has a poorly developed drainage system, due to presence of permeable limestone, which covers most of municipal area and enables infiltration of large portion of effective rainfall into underground. This is characteristic for karstified limestone terrain.

Surface water runoff (estimated at 304 mm/km^{2}/yr (31.00 in/sq mi/yr)), is estimated to be 24,100 m^{3}/yr (850,000 cu ft/yr) on average, which is sufficient to satisfy the water demand of 65 m^{3}/day (2,300 cu ft/day) for irrigation purposes.

The potable water demand, including domestic, industrial, institutional and commercial water demands of urban and rural population, was estimated in 1998 to be 926 m^{3}/day (32,700 cu ft/day), projected to increase to 1,529 m^{3}/day (54,000 cu ft/day) by 2030. Majority of this water demand (67.4%) in 2030 is for urban population. The water demand estimated at 65 m^{3}/day (2,300 cu ft/day), is required to irrigate 1.5 hectares (3.7 acres) of land in brgy Ponong.

=== Climate ===
Climate data for Alburquerque, Bohol
Month	Jan	Feb	Mar	Apr	May	Jun	Jul	Aug	Sep	Oct	Nov	Dec	Year
Mean daily maximum °C (°F)	28 (82)	29 (84)	30 (86)	31 (88)	31 (88)	30 (86)	30 (86)	30 (86)	30 (86)	29 (84)	29 (84)	29 (84)	30 (85)
Mean daily minimum °C (°F)	23 (73)	22 (72)	23 (73)	23 (73)	24 (75)	25 (77)	24 (75)	24 (75)	24 (75)	24 (75)	23 (73)	23 (73)	24 (74)
Average precipitation mm (inches)	102 (4.0)	85 (3.3)	91 (3.6)	75 (3.0)	110 (4.3)	141 (5.6)	121 (4.8)	107 (4.2)	111 (4.4)	144 (5.7)	169 (6.7)	139 (5.5)	1,395 (55.1)
Average rainy days	18.6	14.8	16.5	16.7	23.9	26.4	25.6	24.1	24.4	26.3	23.7	20.5	261.5
Source: Meteoblue

=== Barangays ===
Alburquerque is politically subdivided into 11 barangays. Each barangay consists of puroks and some have sitios.

There are 6 barangays which characterized as coastal (Bahi, San Agustin, Western Poblacion, Eastern Poblacion, Sta Felomina, and Tagbuane) and 5 as upland (Ponong, Toril, Basacdacu, Cantiguib and Dangay). Furthermore, the urban population is located in three barangays namely, East and West Poblacion and Ponong.

PSGC	Barangay	Population			±% p.a.	
		2024		2010		
071201001	Bahi	8.1%	928	787	▴	1.14%
071201002	Basacdacu	6.9%	793	759	▴	0.30%
071201003	Cantiguib	5.1%	585	555	▴	0.36%
071201004	Dangay	6.7%	769	798	▾	−0.25%
071201005	East Poblacion	17.8%	2,046	1,829	▴	0.77%
071201006	Ponong	10.7%	1,225	1,121	▴	0.61%
071201007	San Agustin	4.8%	552	526	▴	0.33%
071201008	Santa Filomena	8.0%	914	911	▴	0.02%
071201009	Tagbuane	7.5%	867	888	▾	−0.16%
071201010	Toril	6.5%	746	706	▴	0.38%
071201011	West Poblacion	9.7%	1,115	1,041	▴	0.47%
	Total		11,489	9,921	▴	1.01%

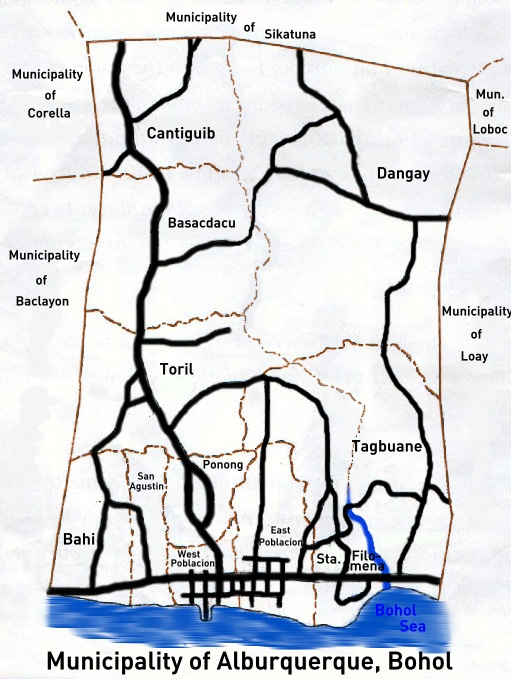

== Demographics ==
Population census of Alburquerque

Year	Pop.	±% p.a.
1903	7,356	—
1918	6,361	−0.96%
1939	6,311	−0.04%
1948	5,966	−0.62%
1960	6,285	+0.43%
1970	6,907	+0.95%

Year	Pop.	±% p.a.
1975	6,505	−1.20%
1980	7,062	+1.66%
1990	6,881	−0.26%
1995	7,709	+2.15%
2000	8,715	+2.66%
2007	9,644	+1.41%

Year	Pop.	±% p.a.
2010	9,921	+1.04%
2015	10,540	+1.16%
2020	11,246	+1.37%
2024	11,489	+0.51%

Source: Philippine Statistics Authority

At the 2004 census, Alburquerque had a total population of 11,489 people, with a population density of 320/km^{2} (830/sq mi) of land and an average population growth rate of 2.66% per annum. The population increased to 11,246 in the 2020 census, with population density of 420/km^{2} (1,100/sq mi).

Alburanons speak in Cebuano/Visayas dialect.

== Economy ==
Poverty incidence of Alburquerque (%)

Source: Philippine Statistics Authority

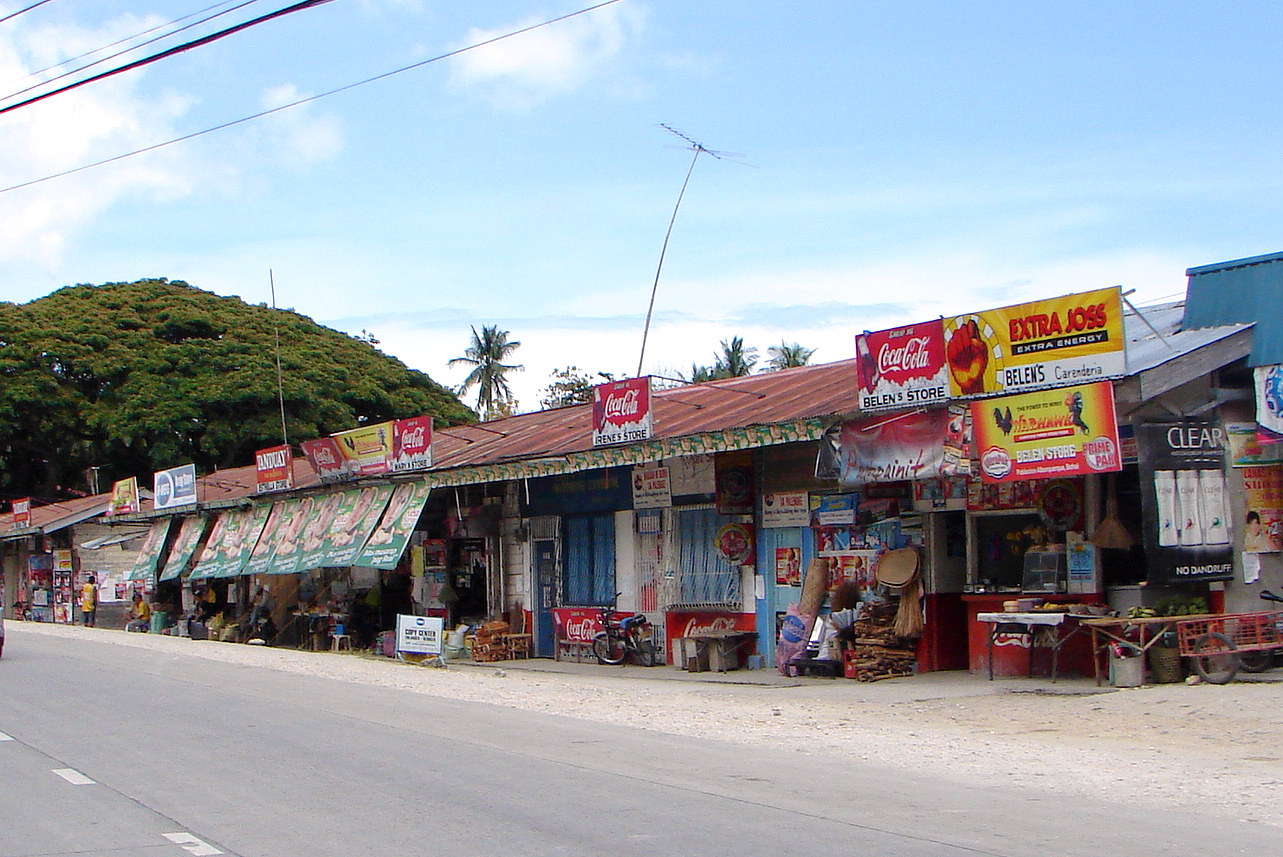
Roadside sari-sari stores in Alburquerque

Alburquerque has an average annual income of Php 27,431,496. The town has a labor force of 37% with an employment rate of 90%. The average family income is Php 4,500/month with an average family expenditures of Php 4,000/month.

The town's major agricultural project is the "Gintong Ani" project in all barangays. (Note: In 1996, President Ramos appointed Salvador H. Escudero for the second time as Department of Agriculture (DA) Secretary. During that time, he launched the Gintong Ani food production and security program. He also organized subsistence farmers into functional groups and cooperatives, aimed at transforming them into viable producers and entrepreneurs.) One industry is situated in Eastern Poblacion - the Santisima Trinidad Ice Plant. There are 66 micro-type and 2 cottage-size registered business establishments with total combined investments of Php 1.5 million. The existing tourists destinations are Sta Monica stone church and convent, Sta Fe beach resort, calamay making, ceramics making, salt making, loom weaving, basket and broom-making. The potential attractions are Tarsiers Park, Lourdes Spring, Aquarium Fish, Butterfly Sanctuary.

=== Cottage industries ===
Household weaving takes place in barangay Basacdacu. Buri cloth is made from local young buri leaves for export to Cebu. Midribs of the buri palm leaf are sold for basket making, and bundles of bure stems (pawa) to Tagbuane barangay for broom-making.

Several households use strips of older buri leaves to make spear-head-shaped fans 30 by 30 inches (760 by 760 mm) and smaller fans of 18 by 18 inches (460 by 460 mm) that they sell in Cebu. There are 50 households in the area making brooms from buri stems and bamboo poles.

Salt-making is another source of income for some Alburanons. Production begins when the upland farmers plow their fields for rice production. This is because the "asinderos" (Note: These salt farmers jokingly refer to themselves as asinderos, a play on the Spanish word hacienderos meaning the landed owners of plantations, whereas asin is the Filipino word for salt.) salt-makers trade their salt for rice in a barter system, and salt production takes about as long as the growth of the rice it will be exchanged for.

The pottery-making enterprise is located beside the main road in East Poblacion. Clay is dug from a pit near the sea, and mixed with silicate soil before being ground through the large rollers of an electric mill, in a pit beside the pottery works. This is mixed with water and molded into pots of various sizes and shapes on a potter's wheel.

== Tourism ==
The municipality of Alburquerque has natural wonders and micro local industries like the making of calamay, traditional method of manufacturing pottery, and the weaving of raffia using locally made loom.

=== Municipal Marine Sanctuary ===
The Municipal Marine Sanctuary, established in 2000 at brgy Sta Felomina where the beach and the Mangrove Protected Area are located, is set up in the area selected to be fit for the purpose due to its coral cover. The sanctuary contributed to rising fish stocks and corals that had been destroyed by illegal fishers. Bamboo rafts have been put in place to observe the marine ecology. It has been considered as a dive site of the municipality for local and foreign tourist visiting the place. Other activities include trekking up to Tagbuane River passing through a Forestal Reserve Zone.

=== Heritage ===
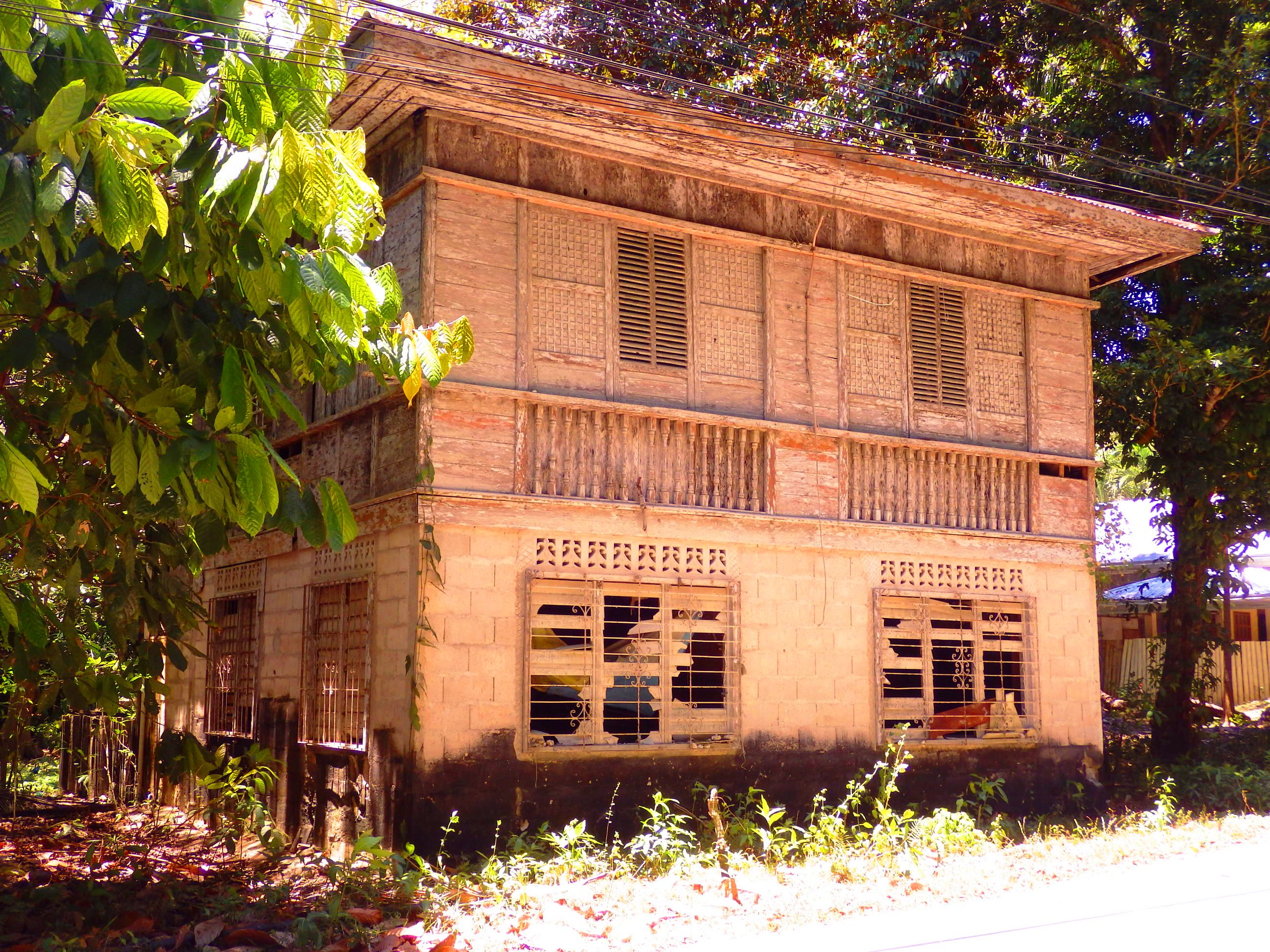
Bungabong House

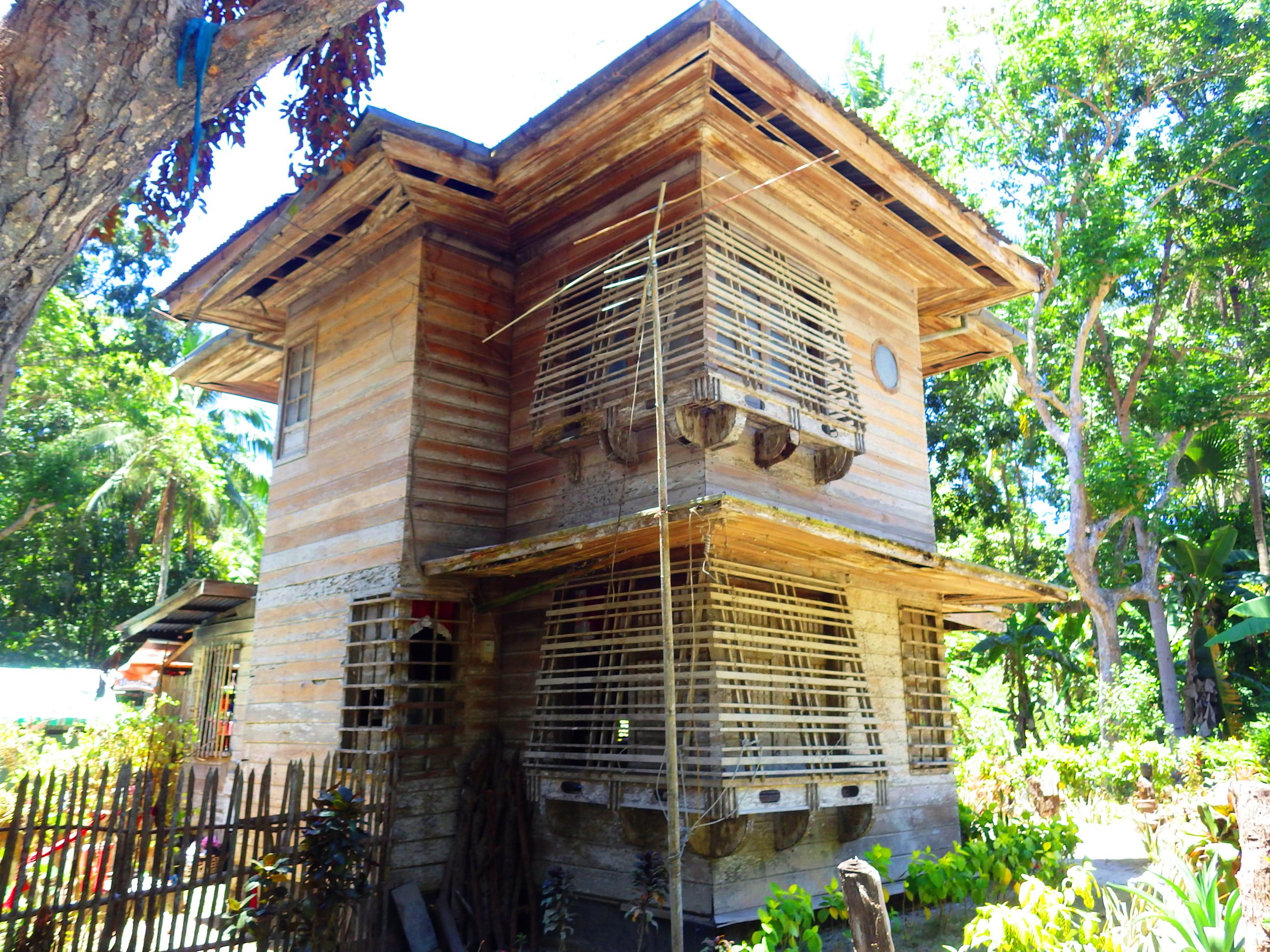
Malangit House

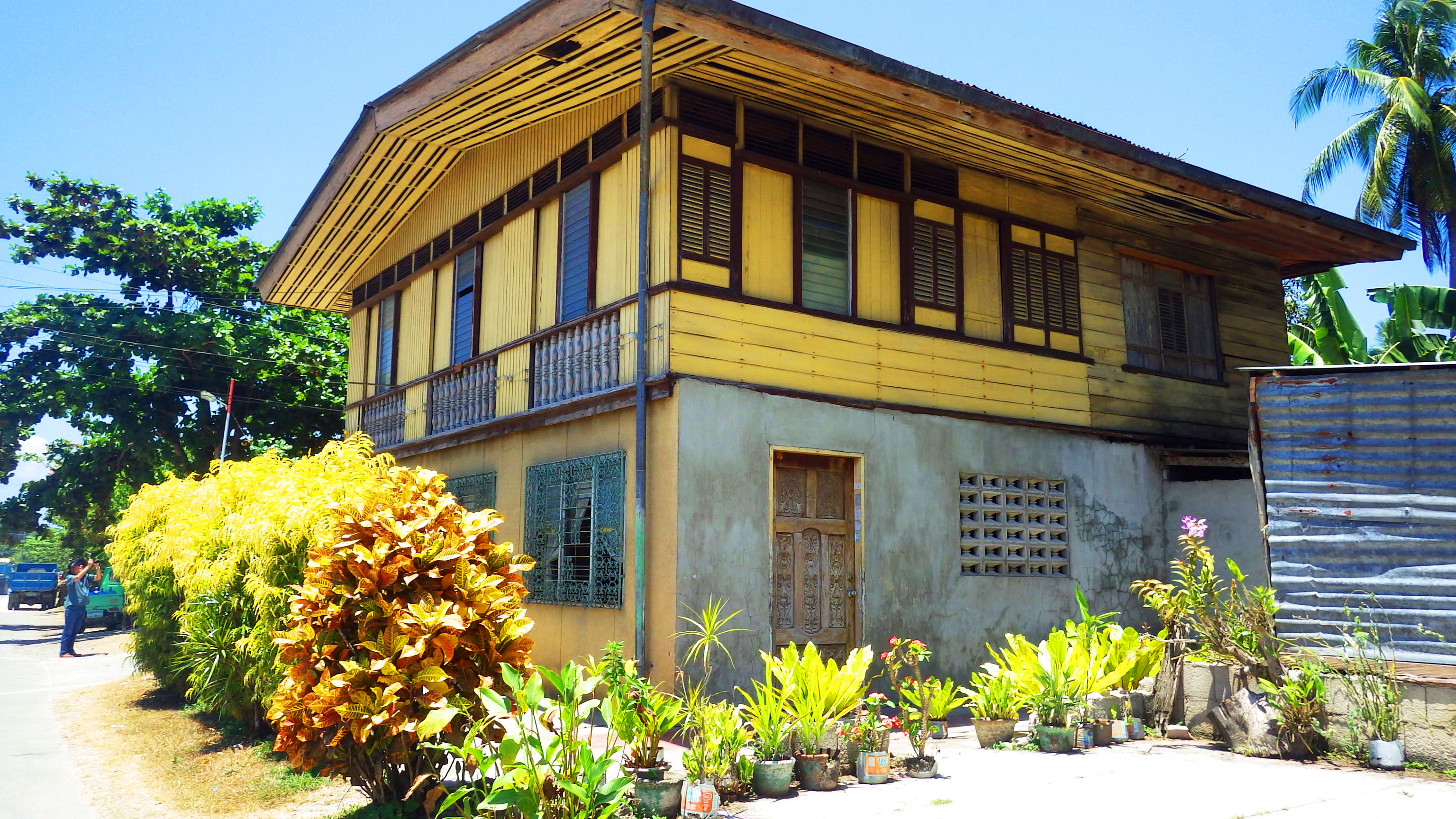
Plaza House

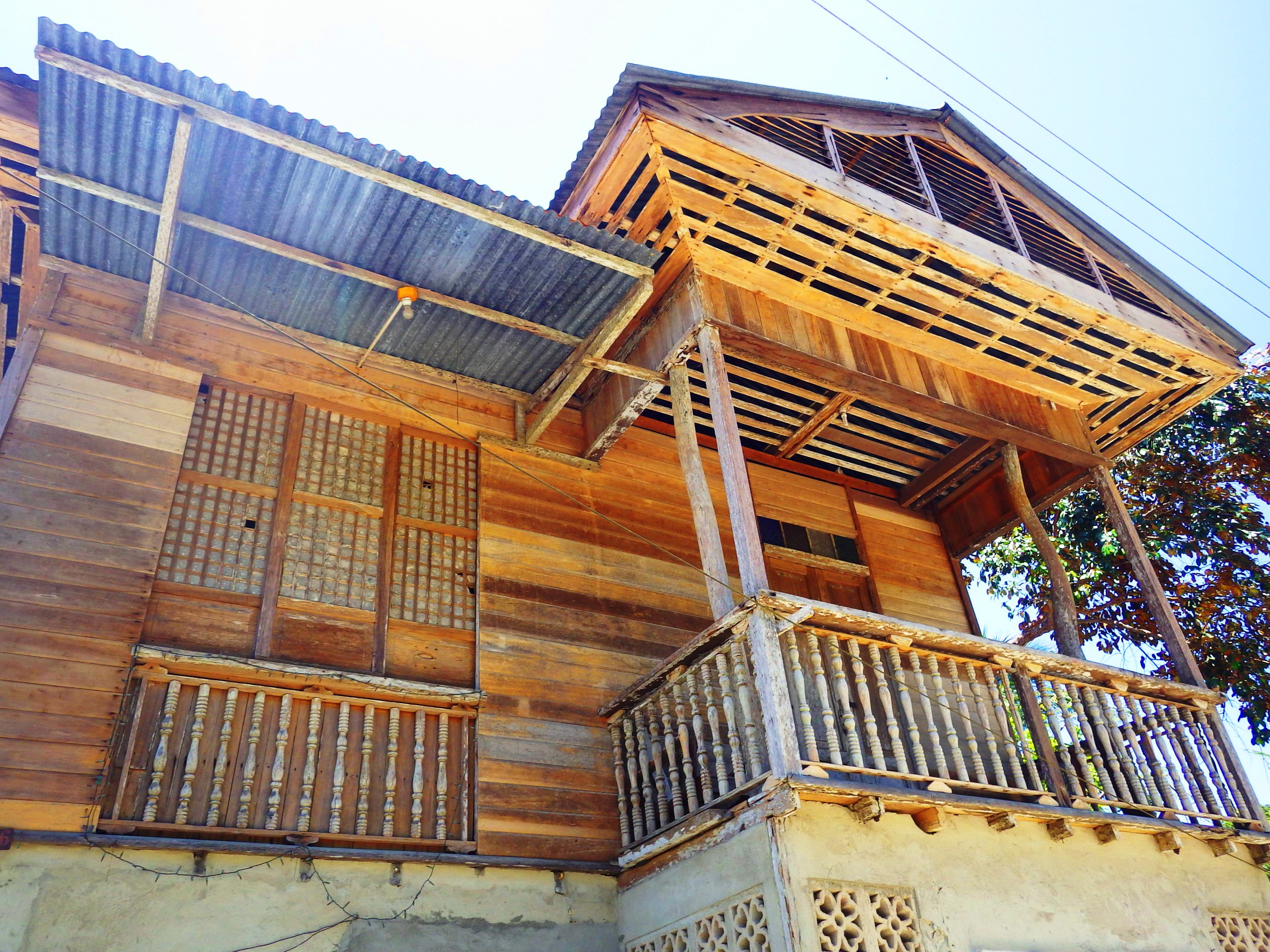
Sinajon House

=== Church and convent ===
==== Creation of the parish ====
Some sources say the parish had its beginning as a visita in 1842 when a chapel was built under the direction of the parish priest of Baclayon. The parish advocated to Santa Monica was canonically established on 18 June 1869, following royal approval given in November 1868. During the Spanish colonial era, the Augustinian Recollect friars administered the parish.

==== Creation of the church ====
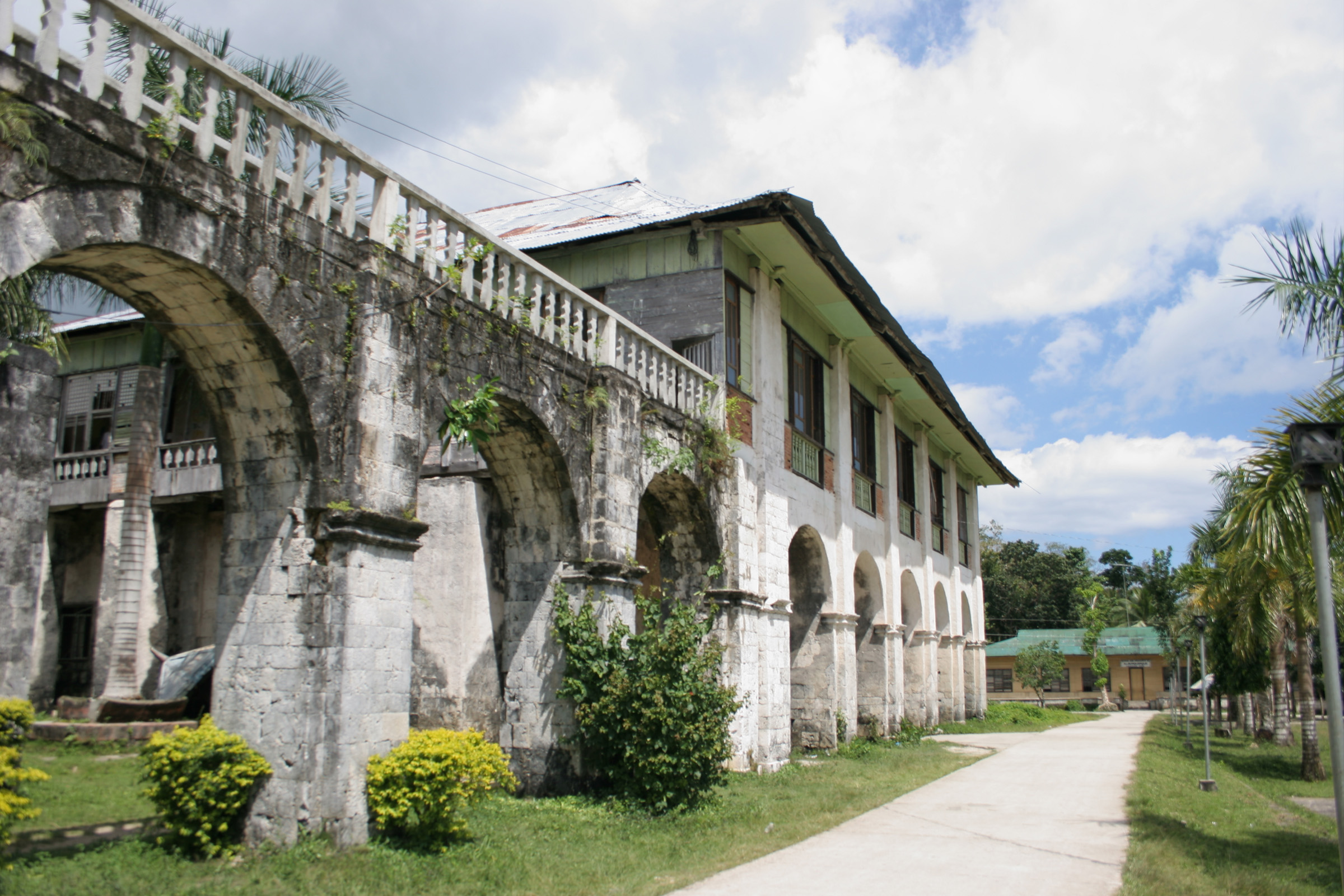
Parish convent

Up to the 1880s, the parish church was more like a huge shed. Although it boasted three aisles, its walls were only of tabique. The present church of coral stone was commenced shortly afterwards, utilizing the same three-aisled plan. However, the upper portions, especially the tower over the façade, were completed during the first half of this century. On examination it becomes clear that the link between the church and the casa parroquial was planned along a grander scale, but never finished. The grotto at the back of the courtyard between the two structures hides a ruin which may be of another unfinished arcade.

Ray Francia signed the church's interior ceiling painting on one side of the choir loft. Another section, now vanished, showed that the painting was carried out from 12 April to 3 August 1932. As regards the church bells, amongst them in the quadrangular tower are three bells, inscribed with the patron saints of the parish (Santa Monica, San Agustin, and "Calipay" or Joy). Dated 1866, two years before the ecclesiastical recognition of the parish, the bells are testimonies to the anxiety of the community in becoming an independent parish.

As to the casa parroquial, the year 1876 is etched over the porta maior. However, in the center of the entrance arches to the steps, the year 1884 could be read until recently.

The church was severely damaged in the 2013 earthquake.

== Local government ==
- Mayor: Don Ritchie P. Buates
- Vice Mayor: Dagohoy N. Samar
- SB Members:
  - Jessica B. Doria
  - Voltaire R. Buates
  - Alex S. Andoy
  - Jacqueline A. Buates
  - Eleanor V. Balo
  - Paul A. Jubac
  - Adriana B. Milo
  - Kien Alphe M. Garsuta

== Infrastructure ==
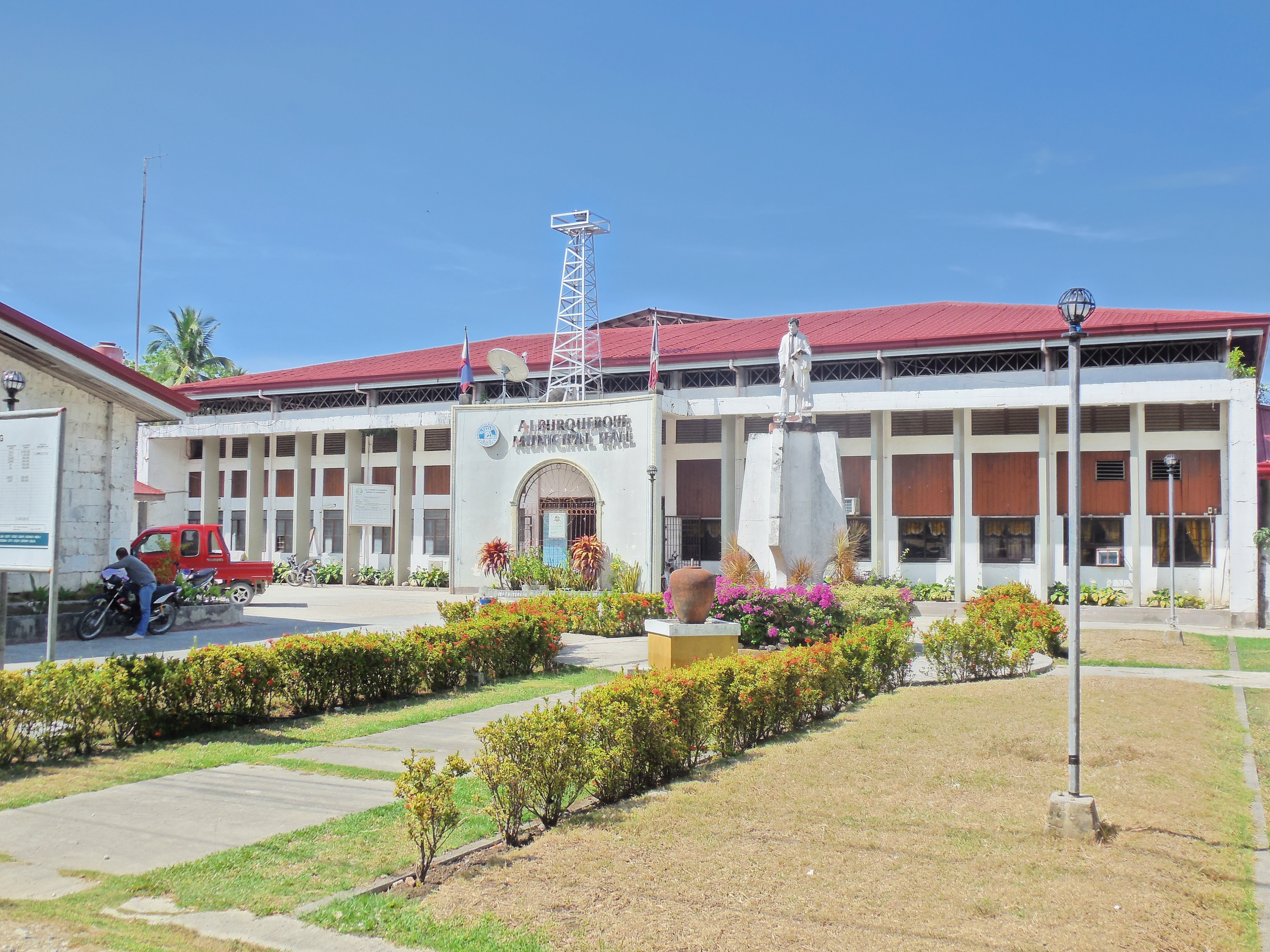
Municipal Hall, Alburquerque

Alburquerque's road network is classified into:

- national 4.4 kilometres (2.7 mi)
- provincial 7.3 kilometres (4.5 mi)
- municipal 3.7 kilometres (2.3 mi)
- barangay 60.2 kilometres (37.4 mi).

It has one bridge, the 39 L.M. Bridge to brgy Tagbuane. The power supply is currently distributed by the Bohol Electric Cooperative I (BOHECO I) which served a total of 1,281 households in the 11 barangays. The main source of potable water supply is groundwater. The total potable water demand of 1,070 cubic metres (280,000 US gal) per day.

The municipality has one local port situated in Western Poblacion, which serves local fishermen as well as other fishing vessels and cargo vessels in transporting equipment and raw materials from other neighboring provinces. It is fitted with proper lighting and equipment. The municipal LGU as well as the barangay officials ensure the safety, peace and order situation and proper maintenance of the port.

=== Waterworks ===
One of the biggest projects of the present administration is to provide its constituents with a sufficient potable water supply. Almost 80% of the barangay in the municipality currently has water connections.

== Education ==
Ensuring quality education to the people is also one of the top concerns of the local officials. The LGU assisted in determining and developing appropriate actions that would address the educational needs of the Alburanons in terms of budgetary allocations, maintenance of facilities and policies concerning education.

Alburquerque has one public secondary school, San Roque High School. It has four elementary schools for intermediate level and three primary schools. It has also a total of 11 day care centers, one center in each barangay and one private pre-school. The number of teachers in the municipality is only 63 and the teacher student ratio in elementary is 1:24 and 1:43 in secondary level.

Primary and Elementary Schools
  - Alburquerque Central Elementary School
  - Alburquerque Hilltop Learning School Inc.
  - Bahi Primary School
  - Canlimpong Primary School
  - Cantiguib Primary School
  - Kindergarten School of Saint Philip Neri., Inc.
  - Dangay Elementary School
  - Tagbuane Elementary School
  - Toril Elementary School

== Sources ==
- Akpenodu, Erik; Saloma, Czarina (2011). Casa Boholana: Vintage Houses of Bohol. Ateneo de Manila University Press. ISBN 978-9715506182.
- Barudo (5 July 2004). "Establishment of Alburquerque as a Town". Alburbohol.net. Archived from the original on 12 February 2006.
- Coronas, José (1920). The Climate and Weather of the Philippines, 1903 – 1918. Manila Observatory: Bureau of Philippines.
- The Philippine Star, Ric Obedencio (13 August 2013). "Prony, Bohol's beloved python, dies". Archived from the original on 2013-08-17.
