= List of historical markers of the Philippines in Central Visayas =

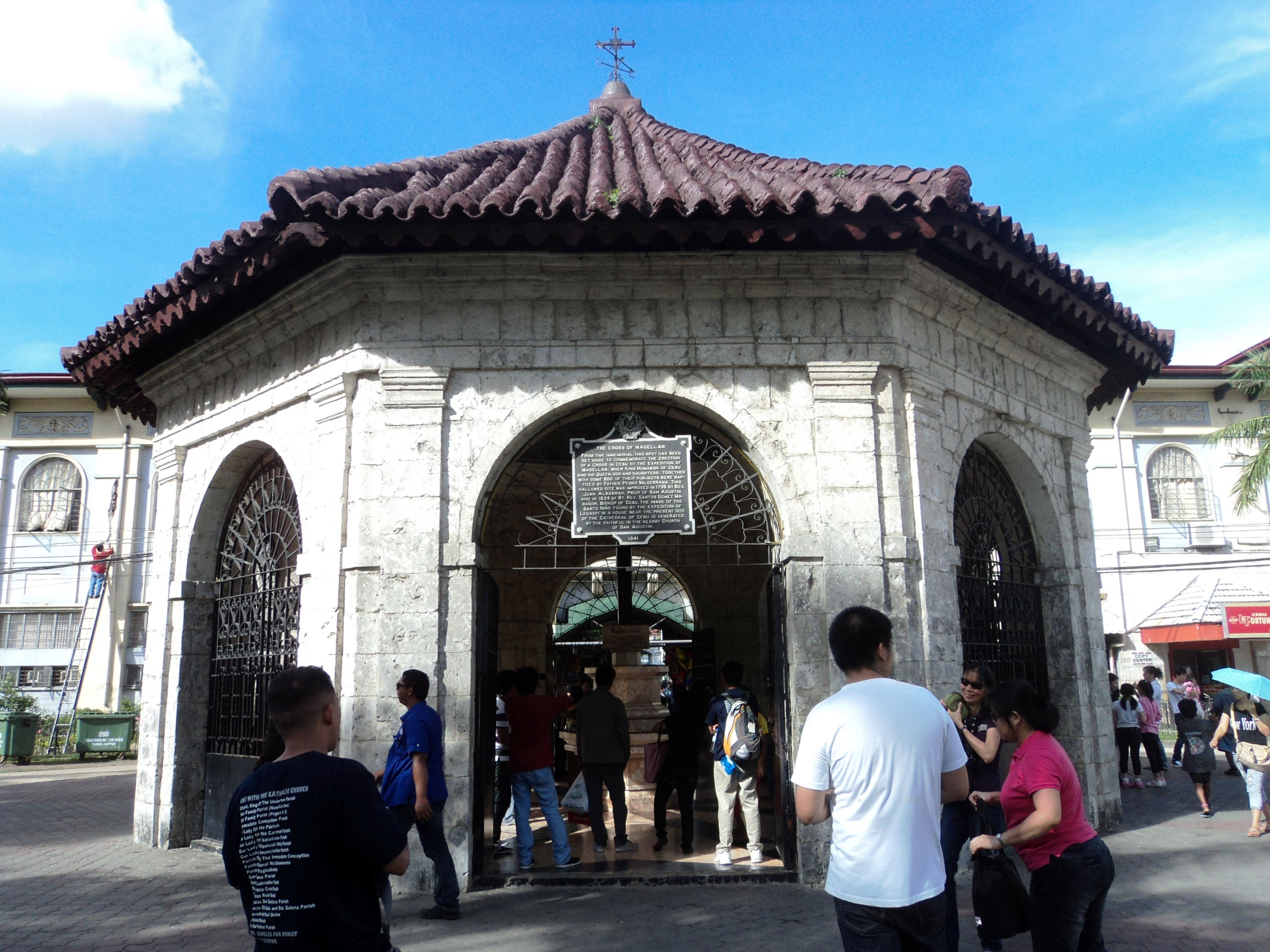
Magellan's Cross chapel and historical marker in Cebu City, Cebu

This list of historical markers installed by the National Historical Commission of the Philippines (NHCP) in Central Visayas (Region VII) is an annotated list of people, places, or events in the region that have been commemorated by cast-iron plaques issued by the said commission. The plaques themselves are permanent signs installed in publicly visible locations on buildings, monuments, or in special locations.

While many Cultural Properties have historical markers installed, not all places marked with historical markers are designated into one of the particular categories of Cultural Properties.

The first historical marker in the Cebuano Language was unveiled in 2008 for the Cebu Provincial Capitol, Cebu City. Another marker in the same language was unveiled for Carcel de Cebu the next year.

The site of the historical marker of the Sandugo, or the blood compact between Sikatuna and Legazpi became an issue because of the NHCP board resolution that the event site was located off the waters of Loay and not Tagbilaran. Despite the resolution, the marker remains in its original place.

This article lists 89 markers from Central Visayas, including six that are part of the Quincentennial historical markers series.

== Bohol ==
This table lists 30 markers from the province of Bohol.

Marker title	Description	Location	Language	Date issued	Image
Balilihan Belfry	Became a guard tower for the Spanish, Americans, and the Japanese. Built in 1844.	Balilihan	English	1953	
Bantayan ng Punta Cruz (Note: Santa Cruz Fort)	Built by Recollect priests out of corals in 1798 against Moro pirates. Built under the patronage of St. Vincent Ferrer.	Punta Cruz	Filipino	May 16, 2009	
Birthplace of Carlos P. Garcia	Born on November 4, 1896. Became president of the Philippines from 1957 to 1960.	Talibon	English	1973	
Blood Compact Between Sikatuna and Legaspi	The site where the Sandugo between Datu Sikatuna and Miguel López de Legazpi took place	Tagbilaran City	English	1941	
Bohol; Ruta ng Ekspedisyong Magallanes–Elcano sa Pilipinas (Note: Bohol: Route of the Magellan–Elcano Expedition in the Philippines)	Members of the expedition fled to here from Cebu after many were killed by Cebuanos.	Brgy. Punta Cruz, Maribojoc	Filipino	June 17, 2021	
Carlos P. Garcia	Born on November 4, 1896. Became president of the Philippines from 1957 to 1960.	Talibon	English	November 4, 1972	
Carlos P. Garcia House	Declared as a heritage house by the NHCP.	Tagbilaran City	English	September 4, 2009	
Church of San Pedro Apostol	Jesuit Fr. Juan de Torres established the mission of Loboc in 1597.	Loboc	English	1999	
Church of Tagbilaran	One of the six parishes in Bohol founded by the Jesuits. Established in 1595.	Tagbilaran City	Filipino	1953	
Clarin Ancestral House	Declared as a heritage house by the NHCP.	Loay	English	June 29, 1999	
Dauis Church Complex	Church and other structures built by the Jesuits out of coral.	Dauis	Filipino	May 16, 2009	
Guindulman	Became a town in 1798. Town was burned by the Japanese in 1943.	Guindulman	Filipino	September 7, 1985	
Katedral ng Tagbilaran (Note: Cathedral of Tagbilaran)	Established by Jesuits as a visita of Baclayon, became a parish, 1742.	Tagbilaran Cathedral, Tagbilaran City	Filipino	May 30, 2024	
In Memory of Francisco Dagohoy	Filipino revolutionary against the Spaniards, 1744–1829. Established an independent government.	Magtangtang, Danao	English	1954	
Jagna Martyrs	Filipino resistance against the American rule, 1901. The Americans burned the whole town.	Brgy. Lonoy, Jagna	English	1958	
Ang Sandugo (Note: The Blood Compact)	Blood compact between Miguel Lopez de Legazpi and Datu Sikatuna	Hinawanan, Loay	Filipino	March 25, 2006	
Simbahan ng Alburquerque (Note: Church of Alburquerque)	First built out of wood and bamboo in 1842. Has an arched bridge that connects the church to the convent that is unique among Bohol churches.	Alburquerque	Filipino	August 27, 2014	
Simbahan ng Baclayon (Note: Church of Baclayon)	Church built by the Jesuits. Site where Jesuit priests Juan de Torres and Gabriel Sanchez formally established the first Christian mission to Bohol on November 17, 1596.	Baclayon	Filipino	December 18, 1995	
Simbahan ng Carmen (Note: Church of Carmen)	Established by the Recollects as a visita of Bilar. Became a separate parish in 1874.	Carmen	Filipino	January 16, 2018	
Simbahan ng Dauis (Note: Church of Dauis)	Church built by the Jesuits. Current church was built from 1863 to 1879.	Dauis	Filipino	May 16, 2009	
Simbahan ng Duero (Note: Church of Duero)	Established in 1863 by the Recollects. Current structure of wooden church and convent built in 1874.	Duero	Filipino	March 10, 2015	
Simbahan ng Inabanga (Note: Church of Inabanga)	Church built by the Jesuits in 1724, destroyed by the earthquake of 2013	Inabanga	Filipino	March 10, 2015	
Simbahan ng Jagna (Note: Church of Jagna)	Church built by the Jesuits in 1631. The church was saved when the Americans burned the town in 1901.	Jagna	Filipino	March 10, 2015	
Simbahan ng Loon (Note: Church of Loon)	Church first built by the Jesuits. Used by the Americans as garrison against Filipino guerrillas.	Loon	Filipino	2010 (replaced in 2021)	
Simbahan ng Loon (Note: Church of Loon)	Destroyed by an earthquake 2013. Rebuilt 2021.	Loon	Filipino	September 7, 2021	
Simbahan ng Maribojoc (Note: Church of Maribojoc)	Church built by the Jesuits as a mission and parish on 1767. Dedicated to Santa Cruz.	Maribojoc	Filipino	2009 (replaced in 2021)	
Simbahan ng Maribojoc (Note: Church of Maribojoc)	Established by the Jesuits, 1767. Destroyed by an earthquake 2013. Rebuilt 2021.	Maribojoc	Filipino	March 12, 2021	
Simbahan ng Santisima Trinidad ng Loay (Note: Church of Santisima Trinidad of Loay)	Built under the Recollects in 1822. Important example of Filipino-Spanish architecture.	Loay	Filipino	April 30, 2004	
Katedral ng Talibon (Note: Cathedral of Talibon)	Established by the Jesuits in 1722. Seat of the Diocese of Talibon, center of Catholicism in northern Bohol.	Talibon	Filipino	March 10, 2015	
Simbahan ng Tubigon (Note: Church of Tubigon)	Church built by the Jesuits and transferred to the Recollects, destroyed by the 2013 earthquake	Tubigon	Filipino	March 9, 2015	

== Cebu ==
This table lists 28 markers from the province of Cebu, including five in the independent city of Lapu-Lapu.

Marker title	Description	Location	Language	Date issued	Image
Balay na Tisa (Sarmiento-Osmeña House) (Note: Brick House (Sarmiento-Osmeña House))	Designated as a heritage house by the NHCP.	Carcar	English	2010	
Ang Dakong Balay (Don Florencio Noel House) (Note: The Big House (Don Florencio Noel House))	Declared as a heritage house by the NHCP.	Carcar	English	2010	
Ferdinand Magellan's Death	Death site of Magellan wounded by soldiers of Lapulapu.	Liberty Shrine, Lapu-Lapu City	English	1958	
Fernando Magallanes (Note: Ferdinand Magellan)	Designated leader of the Spanish expedition who sought a maritime route to Maluku.	Liberty Shrine, Lapu-Lapu City	Filipino	April 27, 2021	
Lapulapu	Battle site between the forces of Lapulapu and Magellan, fought on April 27, 1521.	Lapu-Lapu City (currently within NHCP storage)	English	1941	
Lapulapu	Chieftain of Mactan who killed Ferdinand Magellan in combat on April 27, 1521.	Liberty Shrine, Lapu-Lapu City	English	1951	
Lapulapu	Stood for the independence of Mactan, and rejected Magellan's decision to appoint Rajah Humabon as the highest leader in Mactan and Cebu.	Liberty Shrine, Lapu-Lapu City	Filipino	April 27, 2021	
Pantaleon Villegas "Leon Kilat" (1873–1898)	Katipunan revolutionary tasked by Aguinaldo to expand the revolution in Cebu.	Carcar City	Filipino	2001	
Mactan; Ruta ng Ekspedisyong Magallanes–Elcano sa Pilipinas (Note: Mactan: Route of the Magellan–Elcano Expedition in the Philippines)	Site where the battle ensued where Magellan was killed.	Liberty Shrine, Lapu-Lapu City	Filipino	April 27, 2021	
Mercado Mansion	Designated as a heritage house by the NHCP.	Carcar	English	2010	
Pagdaong sa Talisay (Note: Talisay Landing)	Part of the Operation VICTOR II under Gen. Douglas MacArthur to liberate Cebu, Bohol, and Negros.	Larawan Beach, Barangay Poblacion, Talisay City	Filipino	2009	
Parola ng Bagacay Point{{|Bagacay Point Lighthouse}}	Built upon the lot donated by Governor General William Howard Taft in 1904.	Liloan	Filipino	May 14, 2006	
Ponson; Ruta ng Ekspedisyong Magallanes–Elcano sa Pilipinas (Note: Ponson: Route of the Magellan–Elcano Expedition in the Philippines)	Where the expedition ended after traversing the coast of Leyte.	Ponson Island, Pilar	Filipino	April 6, 2021	
Poro; Ruta ng Ekspedisyong Magallanes–Elcano sa Pilipinas (Note: Poro: Route of the Magellan–Elcano Expedition in the Philippines)	From Leyte, this is where the expedition temporarily stopped to wait for the balangay fleet of Rajah Colambu.	Mactang Beach, Brgy. Esperanza, Poro (Poro Island)	Filipino	April 6, 2021	
Ramon Magsaysay (1907–1957)	Seventh president of the Philippines. Site of plane crash that killed him.	Mount Manunggal, Balamban	Filipino	March 17, 1988	
Silva House	Declared as a heritage house by the NHCP.	Silva Ancestral House, Carcar	English	2010	
Simbahan ng Argao (Note: Church of Argao)	Formerly a visita of Carcar. Established in 1733. The first church was built in 1788.	Argao Church, Argao	Filipino	July 11, 2016	
Ang Simbahan ng Bantayan (Note: The Church of Bantayan)	Built by the Augustinians on June 11, 1580. The current structure was finished in 1863.	Bantayan Church, Bantayan	Filipino	1980	
Simbahan ng Boljoon (Note: Church of Boljoon)	Started as a visita of Carcar. Built by Augustinians in 1599. The current church was constructed starting from 1783.	Boljoon	Filipino	June 25, 2000	
Simbahan ng Carcar (Note: Church of Carcar)	Established by the Augustinians in 1599 under the patronage of Our Lady of the Visitation.	Carcar City	Filipino	September 25, 2017	
Simbahan ng Dumanjug (Note: Church of Dumanjug)	Formerly a visita of Barili. Became a parish in 1854 under the patronage of St. Francis of Assisi.	Dumanjug	Filipino	June 6, 2016	
Simbahan ng Malabuyoc (Note: Church of Malabuyoc)	Started as a visita of Samboan in 1784. Became a full-fledged parish in 1834 under the patronage of San Nicolas de Tolentino.	Malabuyoc	Filipinpo	September 25, 2017	
Simbahan ng San Guillermo de Aquitania (Note: Church of Saint William of Aquitaine)	Founded as a visita of Carcar in 1690. Became a parish in 1711.	Dalaguete	Filipino	October 3, 2004	
Simbahan ng Oslob (Note: Church of Oslob)	Established as a visita of Carcar in 1599.	Oslob	Filipino	September 23, 2022	
Simbahan ng Samboan (Note: Church of Samboan)	Formerly a visita of Tanjay, Negros Oriental. Became a parish of the Diocese of Cebu under the patronage of Saint Michael the Archangel in 1780.	Samboan Church, Samboan	Filipino	June 8, 2016	
Simbahan ng Sibonga (Note: Church of Sibonga)	Established in 1690. The current neogothic church was built in 1866.	Sibonga	Filipino	December 2, 2010	
Ticobon; Ruta ng Ekspedisyong Magallanes–Elcano sa Pilipinas (Note: Ticobon: Route of the Magellan–Elcano Expedition in the Philippines)	Where the expedition was able to see the island of Cebu.	San Francisco (Pacijan Island)	Filipino	April 6, 2021	
Unang Kasunduan ng Kapayapaan sa Pilipinas (Note: First Peace Treaty in the Philippines)	Signed between Rajah Tupas and Miguel López de Legazpi, acknowledging the sovereignty of Spain.	Fort San Pedro, Cebu City	Filipino	June 4, 1985	

== Cebu City ==
This table lists 31 markers from Cebu City.

Marker title	Description	Location	Language	Date issued	Image
(untitled)	Monument inscription dedicated to Ramon Magsaysay.	Plaza Independencia, Cebu City	English	May 25, 1958	
Ang mga Agustino Rekoleto sa Pilipinas (Note: The Augustinian Recollects in the Philippines)	First arrived in the Philippines in Cebu in 1606.	University of San Jose–Recoletos, P. Lopez cor. Magallanes Sts.	Filipino	April 29, 2023	
Andres Bonifacio (30 Nobyembre 1863 – 10 Mayo 1897) (Note: Andres Bonifacio (30 November 1863 – 10 May 1897))	The founder of the Katipunan. to unite the islands and wage an armed revolution against the Spaniards.	Plaza Independencia, Cebu City	Filipino	December 3, 2013	
Antonio Pigafetta	The chronicler of Ferdinand Magellan. Patrician of Vicenzia, Italy and was a Knight of Malta.	Cebu City	English	1980 (replaced in 2021)	
Antonio Pigafetta	Part of the remaining eighteen that completed the circumnavigation of the world.	Plaza Independencia, Cebu City	Filipino	April 13, 2021	
Bank of the Philippine Islands (BPI)	Third branch of BPI outside Metro Manila. Established in 1924.	Magallanes Street, Cebu City	Filipino	December 2, 2010	
Bradford Memorial Church; 1913	Started as Cebu Mission Station for Presbyterian missionaries.	Bradford Memorial Church, Cebu City	Filipino	October 26, 2013	
Birthplace of Sergio Osmeña Sr.	Site where Osmeña was born on September 9, 1878. He served as the president from 1944 to 1946.	Cebu City	English	September 9, 1959	
Casa Gorordo (Note: Gorordo House)	House built in mid-19th century by Alejandro Reynes y Rosales and bought by Juan Isidro de Gorordo.	Eduardo Aboitiz St., Cebu City	English	August 21, 1998	
Cebu Normal University	Established in 1902, neoclassical building from the designs of Tomás Mapúa.	Cebu Normal University, Cebu City	Filipino	January 20, 2026	
Cebu; Ruta ng Ekspedisyong Magallanes–Elcano sa Pilipinas (Note: Cebu: Route of the Magellan–Elcano Expedition in the Philippines)	The expedition reached an active trading entrepot, April 7, 1521.	Plaza Sugbo, Brgy. Central, Cebu City	Filipino	April 7, 2021	
Church and Convent of Santo Niño	The first church to be established in the Philippines. Home of the Santo Niño.	Cebu City	English	1941	
Colegio de la Inmaculada Concepcion	First all-girls Catholic school in Cebu. Established by Rev. P. Fernando De La Canal on May 30, 1880.	Cebu City	Filipino	March 15, 1979	
Colon Street		Colon St., Cebu City	English		
Colon Street	Also known as the Parian, the oldest street in the Philippines. Built in 1565.	Colon St., Cebu City	English	October 16, 1961	
The Cross of Magellan	The spot where Ferdinand Magellan planted a cross to claim the Philippines for the King of Spain.	Plaza Sugbo, Cebu City	English	1941	
Daang Colon (Note: Colon Street)	First street in the Philippines. Also known as Parian. Built in 1565.	Colon Street Obelisk, Cebu City	Filipino	May 17, 1999	
First Mass in Cebu	Celebrated on April 14, 1521, by Magellan and his men. Rajah Humabon and many more were baptized.	Cebu City	English		
Fort San Pedro	Spanish-era fortification in Cebu City. Triangular in shape and made of stone and mortar.	Cebu City	English	1952	
Fort of San Pedro	Spanish-era fortification in Cebu City. Triangular in shape and made of stone and mortar.	Cebu City	English	1939	
Humabon	Supported the invasion of Magellan to Mactan on April 25, 1521.	Humabon statue, P. Burgos Street, Cebu City	Filipino	May 24, 2022	
Karsel sa Sugbo (Note: Carcel de Cebu)	Formerly a jail built in 1870 out of corals. Converted into the museum of Cebu province in 2008.	Museo Sugbo, Cebu City	Cebuano, Filipino	August 13, 2009	
Katedral ng Cebu (Note: Cathedral of Cebu)	First built in 1595. Became a metropolitan cathedral in 1932. Only the belltower and the perimeter walls survived during World War II.	Cebu City	Filipino	November 23, 2016	
Kapitolyo sa Sugbo (Note: Capitol of Cebu)	First built in front of Plaza Independencia. Building designed by architect Juan Arellano.	Cebu City	Cebuano, Filipino	2008	
Ang Madugong Linggo ng Palaspas; 1898 (Note: The Bloody Palm Sunday: 1898)	The bloody Battle of Tres de Abril headed by Pantaleon Villegas.	Tres de Abril St. cor. V. Rama Ave., Cebu City	Filipino	1966	
Paliparang Lahug, P.A.A.C. (Note: Lahug Airfield, P.A.A.C.)	Stationed on this site, from 1940 to 1941, the only pre-World War II Philippine Army corps units in the Visayas and Mindanao.	Cebu City	Filipino, English	May 1, 1968	
Mga Relihiyosong Agustino sa Pilipinas (Note: Religious Augustinians in the Philippines)	On February 13, 1565, five Augustinians, under Andrés de Urdaneta, arrived in Tandaya, now part of Samar.	Inner Garden, Basilica del Santo Niño, Cebu City	Filipino	August 8, 2018	
Rizal Memorial Library and Museum	Built in 1939 through the designs of Juan Arellano.	Osmeña Boulevard, Cebu City	Filipino	December 5, 2025	
Simbahan ng Pardo (Note: Church of Pardo)	Founded as a parish of the Diocese of Cebu, 1866. Current church built from 1880 to 1893.	Pardo, Cebu City	Filipino	July 11, 2016	
University of the Philippines Cebu College	Established in 1918. Used by the Japanese as prison from 1942 to 1945.	University of the Philippines Cebu, Cebu City	Filipino	December 2, 2010	
University of San Carlos	Established in 1779, the old site of the Jesuit Colegio San Ildefonso.	University of San Carlos, Cebu City	English	2010	

== See also ==
- List of Cultural Properties of the Philippines in Central Visayas

== Bibliography ==
- National Historical Institute (1994). Historical Markers: Regions V-XIII. National Historical Institute.
- National Historical Institute (2008). Historical Markers (1992 - 2006). National Historical Institute.
- A list of sites and structures with historical markers, as of 16 January 2012
- A list of institutions with historical markers, as of 16 January 2012
