= List of Cultural Properties of the Philippines in Central Visayas =

This list contains an overview of the government recognized Cultural Properties of the Philippines in Central Visayas. The list is based on the official lists provided by the National Commission on Culture and the Arts, National Historical Commission of the Philippines and the National Museum of the Philippines.

Cultural Property wmph identifier (Note: wmph is an internal identifier used by Wikimedia Philippines to identify the monument. This is not an official identifier, and only shown temporarily in the templates until the government creates an updated complete list.)	Site name	Description	Province	City or municipality	Address	Coordinates	Image
PH-07-0001	Baclayon Church and Complex		Bohol	Baclayon		9°37′22″N 123°54′44″E	More images
PH-07-0002	Baclayon Plaza		Bohol	Baclayon		9°37′20″N 123°54′47″E	Upload Photo
PH-07-0003	Old Baclayon Municipio		Bohol	Baclayon		9°37′20″N 123°54′49″E	Upload Photo
PH-07-0004	Escuelas de Niños y Niñas		Bohol	Baclayon			Upload Photo
PH-07-0005	Archway and Mortuary Chapel of 19th Century Cemetery		Bohol	Baclayon			Upload Photo
PH-07-0006	Pamilacan Watchtower		Bohol	Pamilacan Island, Baclayon			Upload Photo
PH-07-0007	Balilihan Belfry		Bohol	Balilihan	Our Lady of Mount Carmel Hill		Upload file
PH-07-0008	Balilihan Watchtower		Bohol	Balilihan			Upload Photo
PH-07-0009	Dauis Church and Complex		Bohol	Dauis		9°37′33″N 123°51′54″E	Upload file
PH-07-0010	Dauis Watchtower		Bohol	Dauis			Upload file
PH-07-0011	Dimiao Church		Bohol	Dimiao			Upload file
PH-07-0012	Ermita Ruins		Bohol	Dimiao			Upload Photo
PH-07-0013	Stone bridges		Bohol	Dimiao			Upload Photo
PH-07-0014	Clarin Heritage House		Bohol	Loay		9°36′03″N 124°00′39″E	Upload file
PH-07-0015	Loay Church (Santisima Trinidad)		Bohol	Loay		9°36′03″N 124°00′43″E	Upload file
PH-07-0016	Loay Watchtower		Bohol	Loay	Villalimpia		Upload Photo
PH-07-0017	Loboc Church		Bohol	Loboc		9°38′10″N 124°01′52″E	More images
PH-07-0018	Loon Church		Bohol	Loon	Poblacion	9°47′56″N 123°47′33″E	More images
PH-07-0019	Maribojoc Church		Bohol	Maribojoc		9°44′25″N 123°50′36″E	More images
PH-07-0020	Punta Cruz Watchtower, also Maribojoc Watchtower		Bohol	Maribojoc		9°44′06″N 123°47′24″E	More images
PH-07-0021	Panglao Watchtower		Bohol	Panglao			More images
PH-07-0022	Tagbilaran Church		Bohol	Tagbilaran		9°38′21″N 123°51′21″E	Upload file
PH-07-0023	Carlos P. Garcia House		Bohol	Tagbilaran	F. Rocha cor. A. Hontanosas Streets	9°38′29″N 123°51′29″E	Upload file
PH-07-0024	Argao Church		Cebu	Argao		9°52′55″N 123°36′28″E	More images
PH-07-0025	Sa Dakong Balay (Don Florencio Noel House)		Cebu	Carcar			Upload file
PH-07-0026	Casa Gorordo		Cebu	Cebu City	35 Lopez-Jaena Street	10°18′00″N 123°54′17″E	Upload file
PH-07-0027	Fort San Pedro		Cebu	Cebu City	Antonio Pigafetta Street	10°17′33″N 123°54′21″E	Upload file
PH-07-0028	Matilda Bradford Memorial Church		Cebu	Cebu City	85 Osmeña Boulevard	10°18′21″N 123°53′42″E	Upload file
PH-07-0029	San Guillermo de Aguitania Church		Cebu	Dalaguete			More images
PH-07-0030	Site of the Battle of Mactan		Cebu	Lapu-Lapu	Punta Engaño Rd.	10°18′39″N 124°00′55″E	Upload file
PH-07-0031	Bagacay Point Lighthouse		Cebu	Liloan		10°23′00″N 124°01′07″E	More images
PH-07-0032	Bantayan Church		Cebu	Bantayan			More images
PH-07-0033	Balay na Tisa (Sarmiento-Osmeña House)		Cebu	Carcar		10°06′11″N 123°38′32″E	Upload file
PH-07-0034	Boljoon Church		Cebu	Boljoon		9°37′48″N 123°28′46″E	More images
PH-07-0035	Mercado Mansion		Cebu	Carcar			More images
PH-07-0036	Silva House		Cebu	Carcar			More images
PH-07-0037	Bank of the Philippine Islands (BPI)		Cebu	Cebu City	Magallanes corner P. Burgos Streets	10°17′37″N 123°54′09″E	More images
PH-07-0038	Carcel de Cebu		Cebu	Cebu City	M. J. Cuenco Avenue		Upload file
PH-07-0039	Cebu Provincial Capitol		Cebu	Cebu City	N. Escario Street	10°19′01″N 123°53′26″E	Upload file
PH-07-0040	Colegio de la Inmaculada Concepcion		Cebu	Cebu City	45 Gorordo Avenue		Upload file
PH-07-0041	Colon Street		Cebu	Cebu City		10°17′53″N 123°54′13″E	Upload file
PH-07-0042	Magsaysay Monument		Cebu	Cebu City	Plaza Independencia		More images
PH-07-0043	Santo Niño Church and Convent		Cebu	Cebu City	Sergio Osmeña Boulevard	10°17′40″N 123°54′07″E	More images
PH-07-0044	Sergio Osmeña House		Cebu	Cebu City	Sergio Osmeña Boulevard		Upload file
PH-07-0045	University of San Carlos		Cebu	Cebu City	P. del Rosario Street	10°18′01″N 123°53′55″E	Upload file
PH-07-0046	University of the Philippines Visayas		Cebu	Cebu City	Gorordo Avenue		Upload file
PH-07-0047	Sibonga Church		Cebu	Sibonga		10°01′01″N 123°37′10″E	Upload file
PH-07-0048	Talisay Landing Site		Cebu	Talisay			Upload Photo

== See also ==
- List of historical markers of the Philippines in Central Visayas
