= Pamilacan =

Island in the Philippines and associated barangay

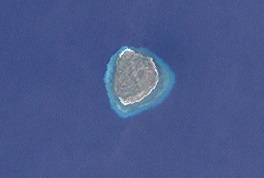
- Satellite image of Pamilacan Island

- Location within Philippines

Geography
- Location: Bohol Sea
- Coordinates: 9.493°N 123.924°E
- Area: 1.75 km^{2} (0.68 sq mi) (Note: estimated from satellite photo)
- Length: 1.6 km (0.99 mi) (Note: long side of right containing rectangle)
- Width: 1.25 km (0.777 mi) (Note: short side of right containing rectangle)
- Coastline: 4.50 km (2.796 mi)

Administration
- Philippines
- Region: Central Visayas
- Province: Bohol
- Municipality: Baclayon

Demographics
- Population: 1,418 (2015)
- Pop. density: 810/km^{2} (2100/sq mi)

Pamilacan is an island barangay in the Philippines, situated 12.5 kilometres (7.8 mi) south of Bohol island and surrounded by the Bohol Sea (also called Mindanao Sea). It is one of the 17 barangays that compose the municipality of Baclayon. According to the 2015 census, it has a population of 1,418, comprising about 240 families whose main livelihoods now concentrate on dolphin- and whale-watching tours and subsistence fishing, but in the past also included whale, dolphin and manta ray hunting.

Pamilacan perhaps means "resting place of the mantas", but it can also be considered to derive from the word pamilac, or harpoon, a device that was historically used to capture the mantas, dolphins and whales.

On the northeast part of the island is a 200‑year‑old Spanish fort, which in the past served as a watchtower for the Spaniards to look out for intruders, such as pirates and other enemies, particularly those coming from the south. Along with the other watchtowers in Dauis, Panglao, Maribojoc, Loay and Balilihan, the island's watchtower was declared by the National Museum of the Philippines as a National Cultural Treasure under the collective group of Bohol Watchtowers on August 29, 2011

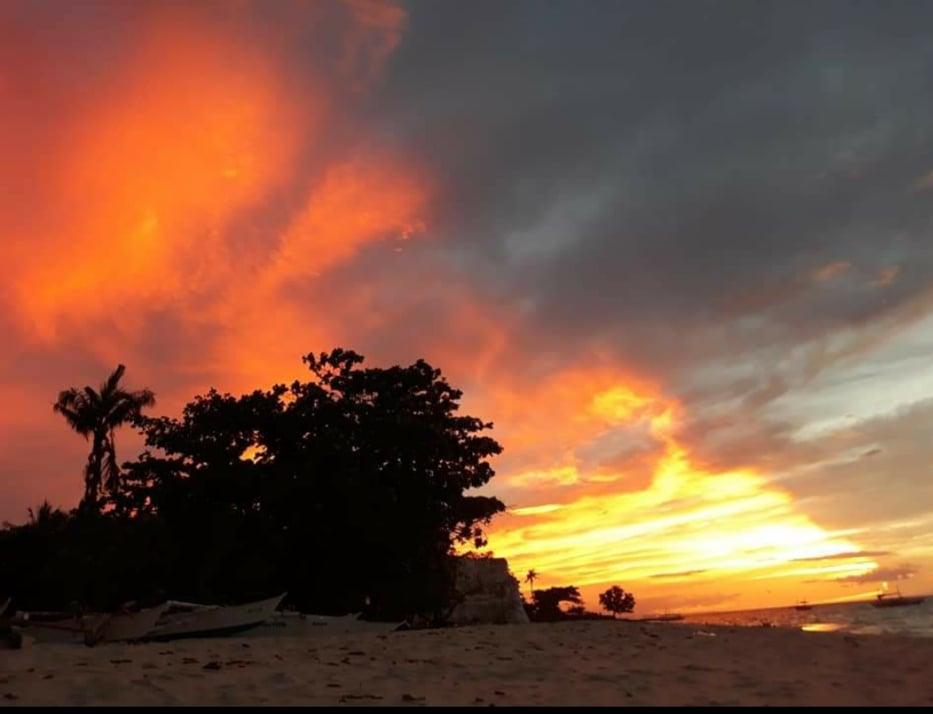
Sunset at Pamilacan Island

Aside from being famous for the whaleshark and dolphin-watching activities, the island is also known for its white sand beaches and renowned for its snorkeling and dive sites, such as Dakit-Dakit. Snake Island or Cervera Shoal is a sunken plateau about 18 metres (59 ft) deep, to the west of Pamilacan. It is covered with coral but lies in the middle of the ocean, which is why there usually is a very strong current. Here one can see black-white banded sea snakes, sea turtles, moray eels, nudibranchs and bucket sponges.
