= Clarin Ancestral House =

Historic house and museum in Bohol, Philippines

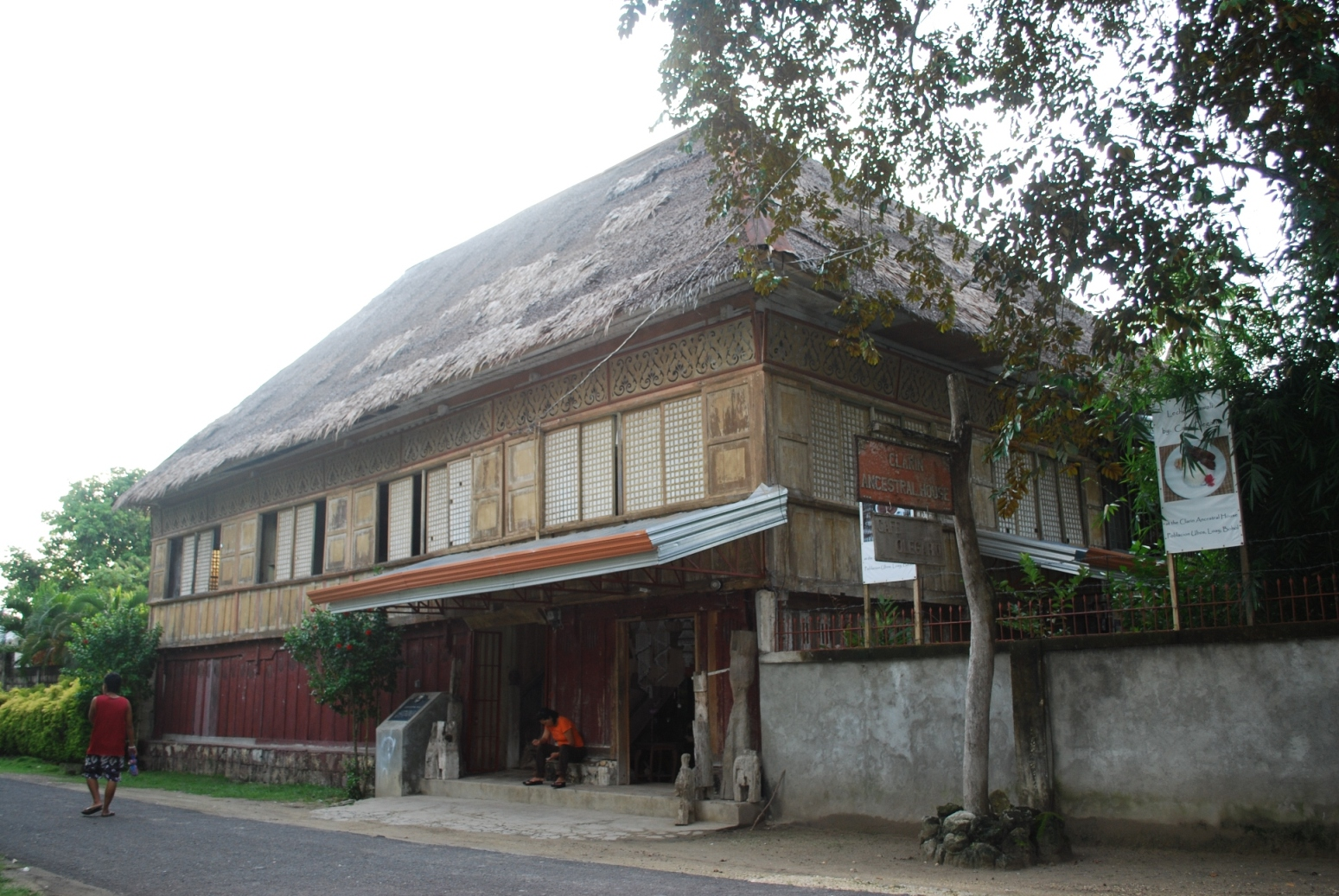
- Facade of the Clarin Ancestral House in Loay, Bohol

General information
- Type: Residential House and Museum
- Architectural style: Bahay na Bato
- Location: Kanipaan Road, Loay, Bohol, Philippines
- Coordinates: 9°36′00″N 124°00′40″E
- Owner: Clarin Family

Technical details
- Material: Stones, Bricks, and Wood

The Clarin Ancestral House is the residence of the Clarin family, a prominent family of politicians from Loay, Bohol, Philippines. It is arguably the most visited of all ancestral houses in Bohol, along with the President Carlos P. Garcia Heritage House in Tagbilaran.

== Location ==
The house is located in the municipality of Loay, around 18 kilometers from Tagbilaran, along Kanipaan Road. It is easily located because it is a short walk across the Tagbilaran East Road from the Loay Municipal Hall. It is also a short distance from the Most Holy Trinity Parish of Loay. The house dates back to the year 1844.

== Structure and interior ==
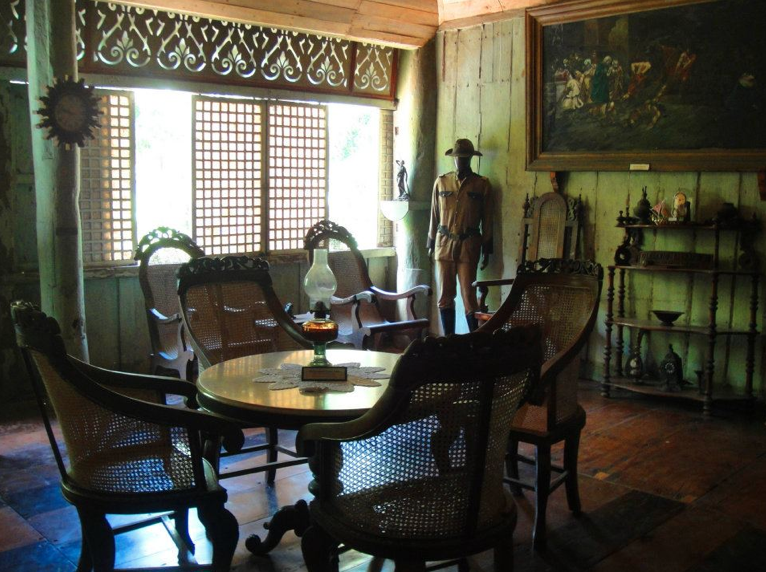
Interior

It is traditional Filipino Bahay na Bato with long slanting roofs covered in nipa leaves. The house has a coral stone foundation, rough-hewn wooden posts, wooden walls and floors of wide hardwood planks and a receiving hall with a high vaulted ceiling. It is made up of two floors: the living quarters being on the upper floor. The upper floor has large and wide windows with capiz-shell sashes that let some sunlight in even when closed. There are about half a dozen four-poster antique wooden beds reflecting the austere Boholano aesthetic.

Currently, a souvenir shop and a cafe, Cafe Olegario, is located in the first floor of the house to accommodate tourists and visitors. The cafe serves native Boholano delicacies.

== The Clarin family ==
The Clarin Ancestral House is the residence of Don Aniceto Velez Clarin, a former governor of Bohol. His two sons, Jose Aniceto Butalid Clarin became the first senator of the Eleventh Senatorial District. The 11th Senatorial District was composed of the provinces of Bohol, Misamis, and Surigao under the Jones Law passed by the United States Congress; and Olegario Clarin, also became a senator from 1946-1951. A family of politicians, many followed in the footsteps of their predecessors and became Mayors and congressmen in Bohol. Descendants now own and maintain the ancestral house.

== Declaration as Heritage House ==
The Clarin Ancestral House was declared as a Heritage House by the National Historical Institute (NHI) pursuant to NHI Board Resolution 8 S. 1998. The 170-year-old house is now a museum housing family collections and memorabilia dating back to the American period.

== See also ==
- Ancestral houses of the Philippines

== Bibliography ==
- Akpedonu, E.; Saloma, C. (2011). Casa Boholana: Vintage Houses of Bohol. Quezon City: Ateneo de Manila University Press.
