= Baclayon =

Municipality in Bohol, Philippines

- Municipality
- Municipality of Baclayon
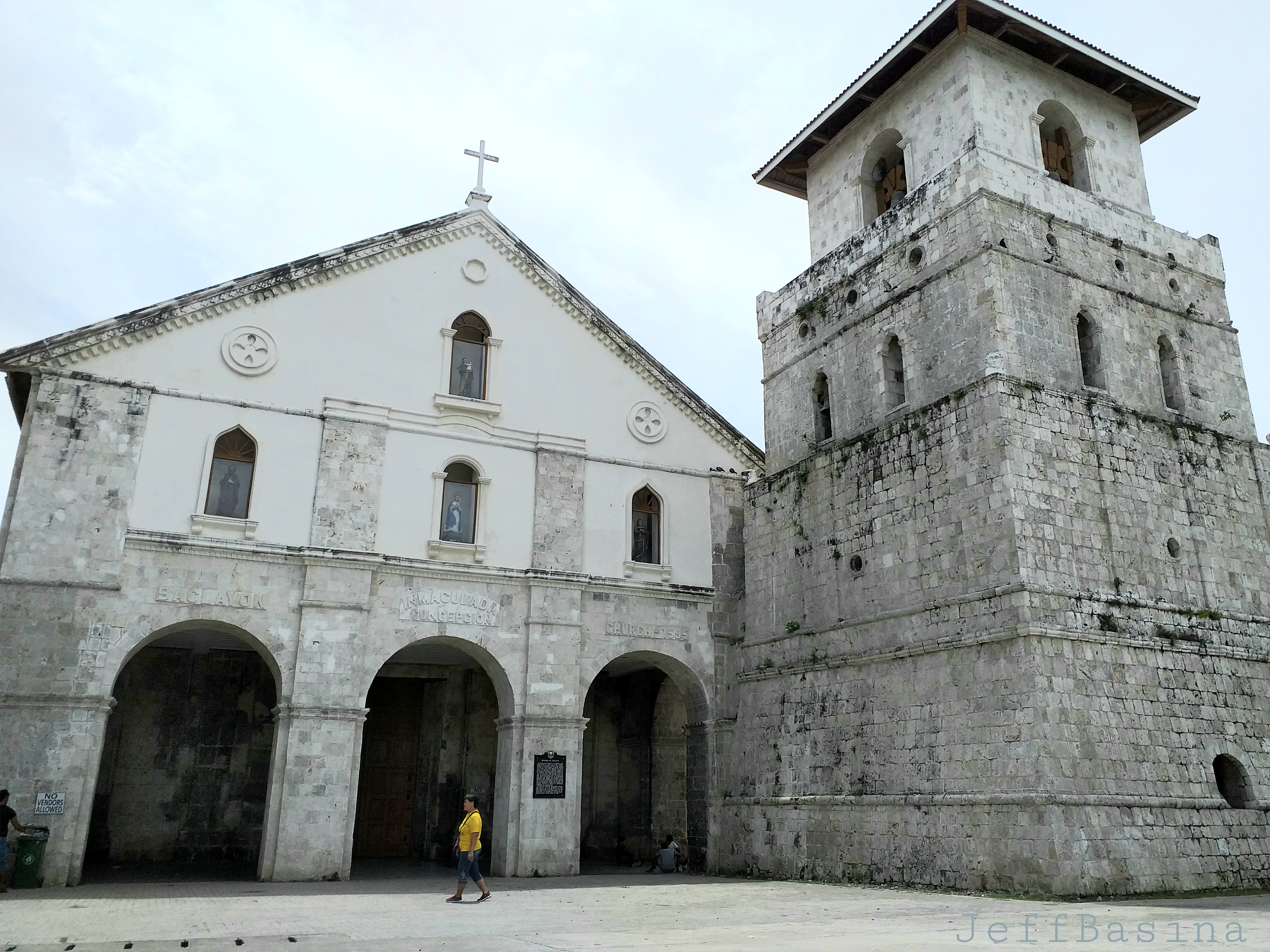
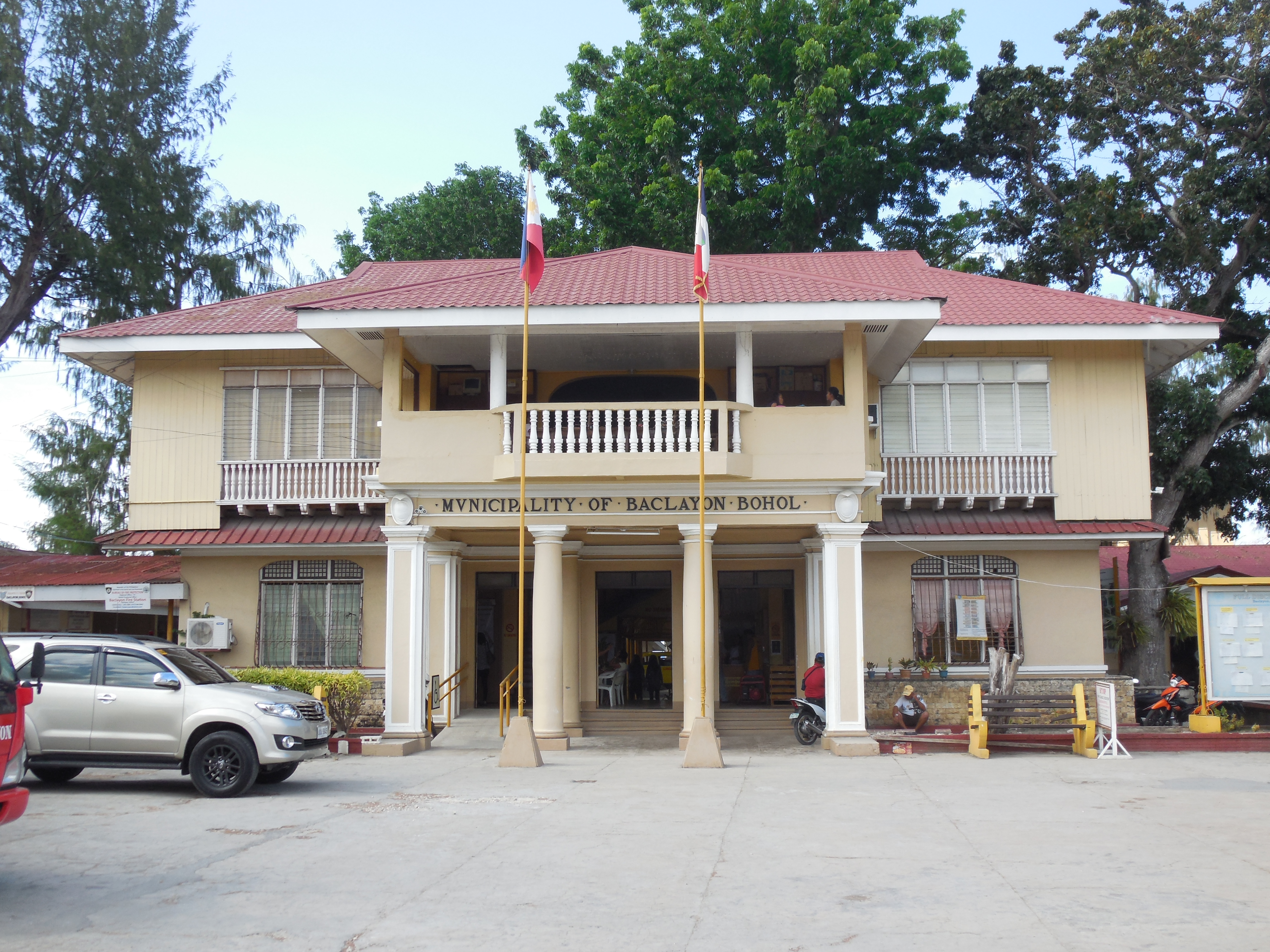
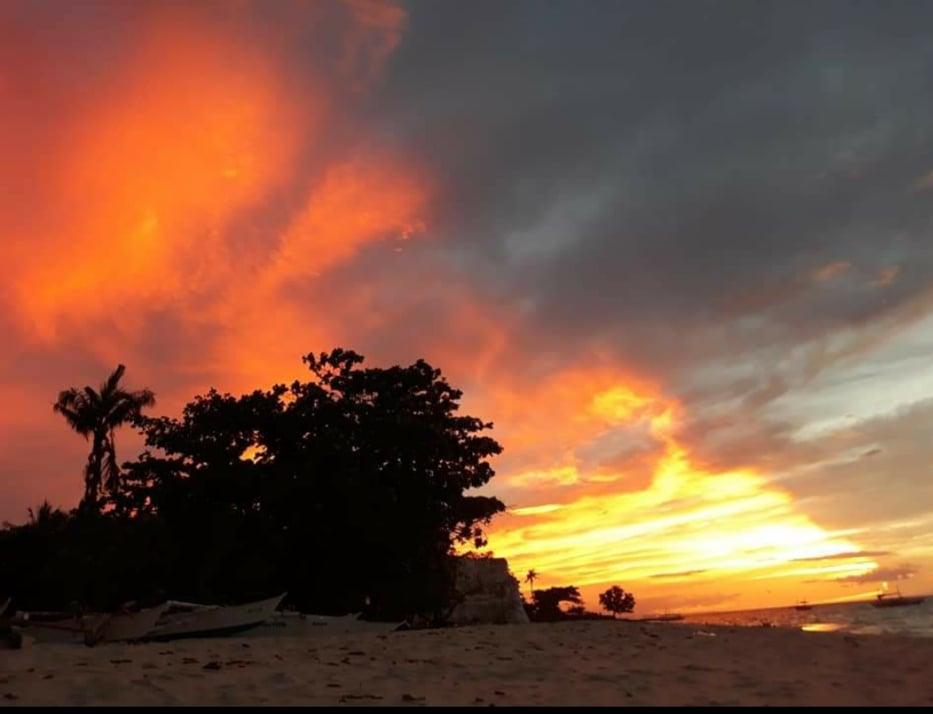
- Baclayon Church Municipal Hall Pamilacan Island sunset

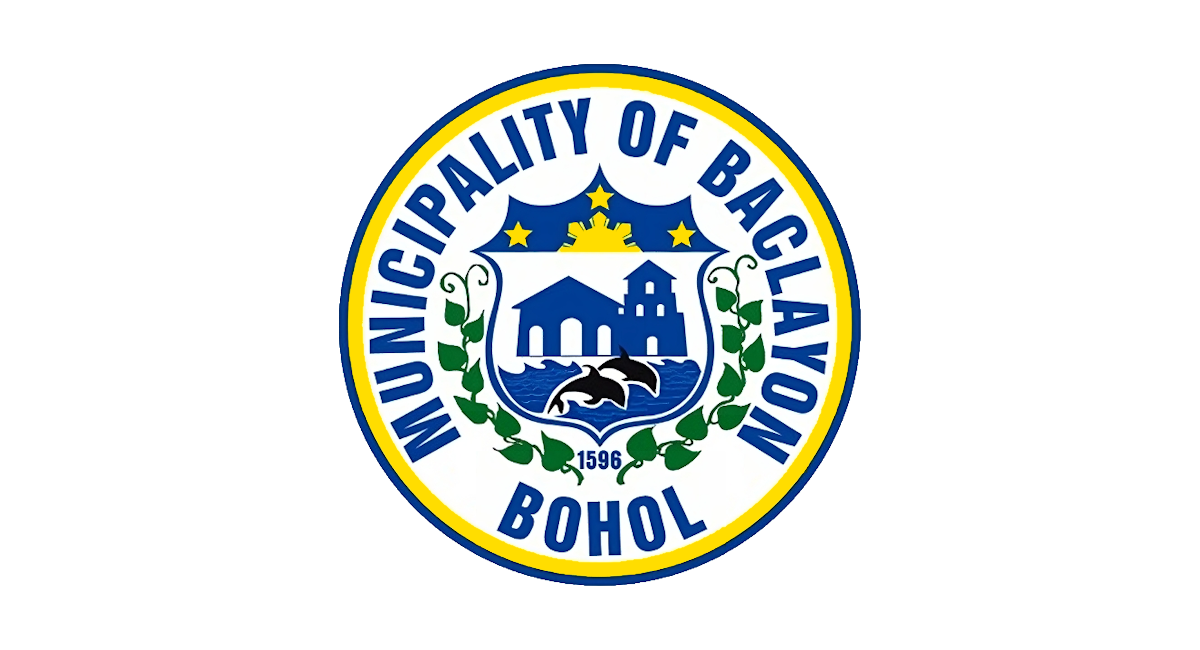
- Flag

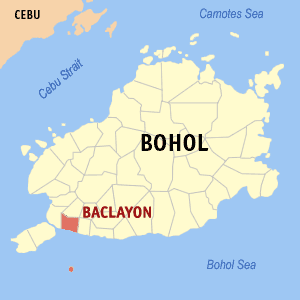
- Map of Bohol with Baclayon highlighted
- Interactive map of Baclayon
- Location within the Philippines
- Coordinates: 9°37′22″N 123°54′48″E
- Country: Philippines
- Region: Central Visayas
- Province: Bohol
- District: 1st district
- Founded: 1595
- Barangays: 17 (see Barangays)

Government
  - Type: Sangguniang Bayan
  - Mayor: A. Alvin J. Uy
  - Vice Mayor: Jodel Theodore C. Cabahug
  - Representative: John Geesnell Yap II
  - Municipal Council: Members: Romulo A. Balangkig; Francis Florfin C. Abay-abay; Romulo S. Caballo; Rosendo B. Guingguing; Clarice Elaine B. Davila; Edilberto M. Salamat Jr.; King King L. Tacusalme; Amon Uy; Johanna Mae Adovo ^{◌}; ◌ ex officio SK chairman
  - Electorate: 14,164 voters (2025)

Area
  - Total: 34.43 km^{2} (13.29 sq mi)
- Elevation: 43 m (141 ft)

Population (2024 census)
  - Total: 22,754
  - Density: 660.9/km^{2} (1,712/sq mi)
  - Households: 5,096

Economy
  - Income class: 4th municipal income class
  - Poverty incidence: 11.02% (2023)
  - Revenue: ₱ 166.7 million (2024)
  - Assets: ₱ 369.4 million (2024)
  - Expenditure: ₱ 85.7 million (2024)
  - Liabilities: ₱ 77.18 million (2024)

Service provider
  - Electricity: Bohol 1 Electric Cooperative (BOHECO 1)
- Time zone: UTC+8 (PST)
- ZIP code: 6301
- PSGC: 071205000
- IDD : area code: +63 (0)38
- Native languages: Boholano dialect Cebuano; Tagalog
- Website: www.baclayon.gov.ph

Baclayon, officially the Municipality of Baclayon (Cebuano: Munisipalidad sa Baclayon; Tagalog: Bayan ng Baclayon), is a municipality in the province of Bohol, Philippines. According to the 2024 census, it has a population of 22,754 people.

It is the home town of actor Cesar Montano, and physicist Caesar Saloma.

Baclayon celebrates its feast day every 8 December to honor the town patron, The Immaculate Conception.

== History ==
Baclayon was the first municipality to be established in Bohol by the Spaniards and included originally the areas now made up by the municipalities of Alburquerque, Balilihan, Corella, and Sikatuna. Its original name was Bacayan, from the root word bacay, meaning "detour" in reference to the fact that travellers used to make a detour there around a rocky cliff.

In 1595, two Jesuit priests, Juan de Torres and Gabriel Sanchez, arrived in Bohol to convert the local populace to Catholicism. With native help, they built a stone church which is considered one of the oldest stone churches in the Philippines, and marked the beginning of the town. In 1600, Moros raided the fledgling settlement, which prompted the Jesuits to relocate their residencia to Loboc.

In 1717, Baclayon gained status of a parish. In 1742, Tagbilaran was separated from Baclayon. The 1818 census recorded 3,549 native families and 3 Spanish-Filipino families. The separation from Baclayon by Alburquerque happened in 1868, Balilihan in 1828, and Corella in 1884.

In 1837, an Augustinian Recollect Fray José Julián Aranguren, the parish priest of Baclayon, once reported an extreme economic and human strain placed on the town by the Military Command led by Captain Manuel Sanz. The town of Baclayon was forced to construct and maintain 5 large boats called Barangayan, forced 120 men to be crews, and demanded 120 unhusked rice for the naval post. The town were also heavily taxed directly by the military from local municipal treasury to fund coastal defense, leaving them bankrupt unable to invest in local public works.

Captain Sanz stationed one or two barangayanes, commanded by Spanish officers, at designated coastal points around Bohol, especially Balicasag and Pamilacan against the Moro raiders. These officers assigned to the armadillas were deeply fearful of deep waters, as they were not sailors but land soldiers. Instead of pursuing raiders, these officers used these armadillas to travel coastal towns and small islands to harass peaceful locals, demanded unlawful requisitions, fining civilians, and publicly whipping natives who were stationed in the watchtowers over trivial flag-signaling errors.

In 1843, a barangayan from Baclayon was stationed at the Cabulao island watch post, yet a raiding fleet of 11 Moro vessels appeared, and the Baclayon vessel engaged. After firing only its first artillery volley, it was immediately boarded and overrun, losing many young men of Baclayon who were either killed, or taken into slavery by the Moro.

On the morning of June 18, 1845, a Moro raiding force consisting of 1 panco and 2 barangayanes appeared in the coast of Baclayon. Commander Manuel Robles assembled a massive counter-force comprising eight of the island's best barangayanes. They were heavily manned and armed, carrying at least of 50 men per boat along with 5 canons and 10 rifles. Later that night, Commander Robles saw a raiding party at the island of Pamilacan, and despite their overwhelming numbers, they did not achieved a decisive results, due to commanders and officers assigned to these sea vessels, were afraid of deep waters and regularly avoid confrontations.

On June 27, 1845, just three days after Commander Robles' return, the exact same Moro raiders returned to the exact same spot in Baclayon. They were unfazed facing the Spanish military force, they even captured a panco owned by the town carrying 10 people and a fishing boat from Cebu carrying several Cebuano fishermen, while taunting, mocked the locals and the Spanish officers.

== Geography ==
Mangrove trees along the Poblacion

Baclayon is 7 kilometres (4.3 mi) from Tagbilaran, the provincial capital. The municipality also has jurisdiction over Pamilacan Island.

=== Barangays ===
Baclayon is politically subdivided into 17 barangays. Each barangay consists of puroks and some have sitios.

PSGC	Barangay	Population			±% p.a.	
		2024		2010		
071205003	Buenaventura	1.7%	395	426	▾	−0.52%
071205001	Cambanac	1.8%	407	395	▴	0.21%
071205002	Dasitam	3.3%	752	700	▴	0.49%
071205004	Guiwanon	6.5%	1,474	1,249	▴	1.15%
071205005	Landican	3.8%	869	708	▴	1.42%
071205006	Laya	4.7%	1,068	1,001	▴	0.45%
071205007	Libertad	5.8%	1,315	1,219	▴	0.52%
071205008	Montana	7.6%	1,719	1,613	▴	0.44%
071205009	Pamilacan	6.2%	1,418	1,422	▾	−0.02%
071205010	Payahan	4.0%	920	821	▴	0.79%
071205011	Poblacion	8.8%	2,009	1,905	▴	0.37%
071205012	San Isidro	4.0%	919	775	▴	1.18%
071205013	San Roque	6.5%	1,478	1,424	▴	0.26%
071205014	San Vicente	5.5%	1,249	1,130	▴	0.69%
071205015	Santa Cruz	8.4%	1,913	1,442	▴	1.96%
071205016	Taguihon	8.2%	1,877	1,689	▴	0.73%
071205017	Tanday	3.6%	809	711	▴	0.89%
	Total		22,754	18,630	▴	1.38%

=== Climate ===
Climate data for Alburquerque, Bohol
Month	Jan	Feb	Mar	Apr	May	Jun	Jul	Aug	Sep	Oct	Nov	Dec	Year
Mean daily maximum °C (°F)	28 (82)	29 (84)	30 (86)	31 (88)	31 (88)	30 (86)	30 (86)	30 (86)	30 (86)	29 (84)	29 (84)	29 (84)	30 (85)
Mean daily minimum °C (°F)	23 (73)	22 (72)	23 (73)	23 (73)	24 (75)	25 (77)	24 (75)	24 (75)	24 (75)	24 (75)	23 (73)	23 (73)	24 (74)
Average precipitation mm (inches)	102 (4.0)	85 (3.3)	91 (3.6)	75 (3.0)	110 (4.3)	141 (5.6)	121 (4.8)	107 (4.2)	111 (4.4)	144 (5.7)	169 (6.7)	139 (5.5)	1,395 (55.1)
Average rainy days	18.6	14.8	16.5	16.7	23.9	26.4	25.6	24.1	24.4	26.3	23.7	20.5	261.5
Source: Meteoblue (modeled/calculated data, not measured locally)

== Demographics ==
Population census of Baclayon

Year	Pop.	±% p.a.
1903	8,055	—
1918	9,000	+0.74%
1939	9,453	+0.23%
1948	8,379	−1.33%
1960	9,050	+0.64%
1970	10,704	+1.69%
1975	10,490	−0.40%
1980	10,776	+0.54%

Year	Pop.	±% p.a.
1990	11,986	+1.07%
1995	12,808	+1.25%
2000	14,996	+3.44%
2007	18,015	+2.56%
2010	18,630	+1.23%
2015	20,591	+1.92%
2020	22,461	+1.85%
2024	22,754	+0.31%

Source: Philippine Statistics Authority

== Economy ==
Poverty incidence of Baclayon (%)

Source: Philippine Statistics Authority

== Tourism ==
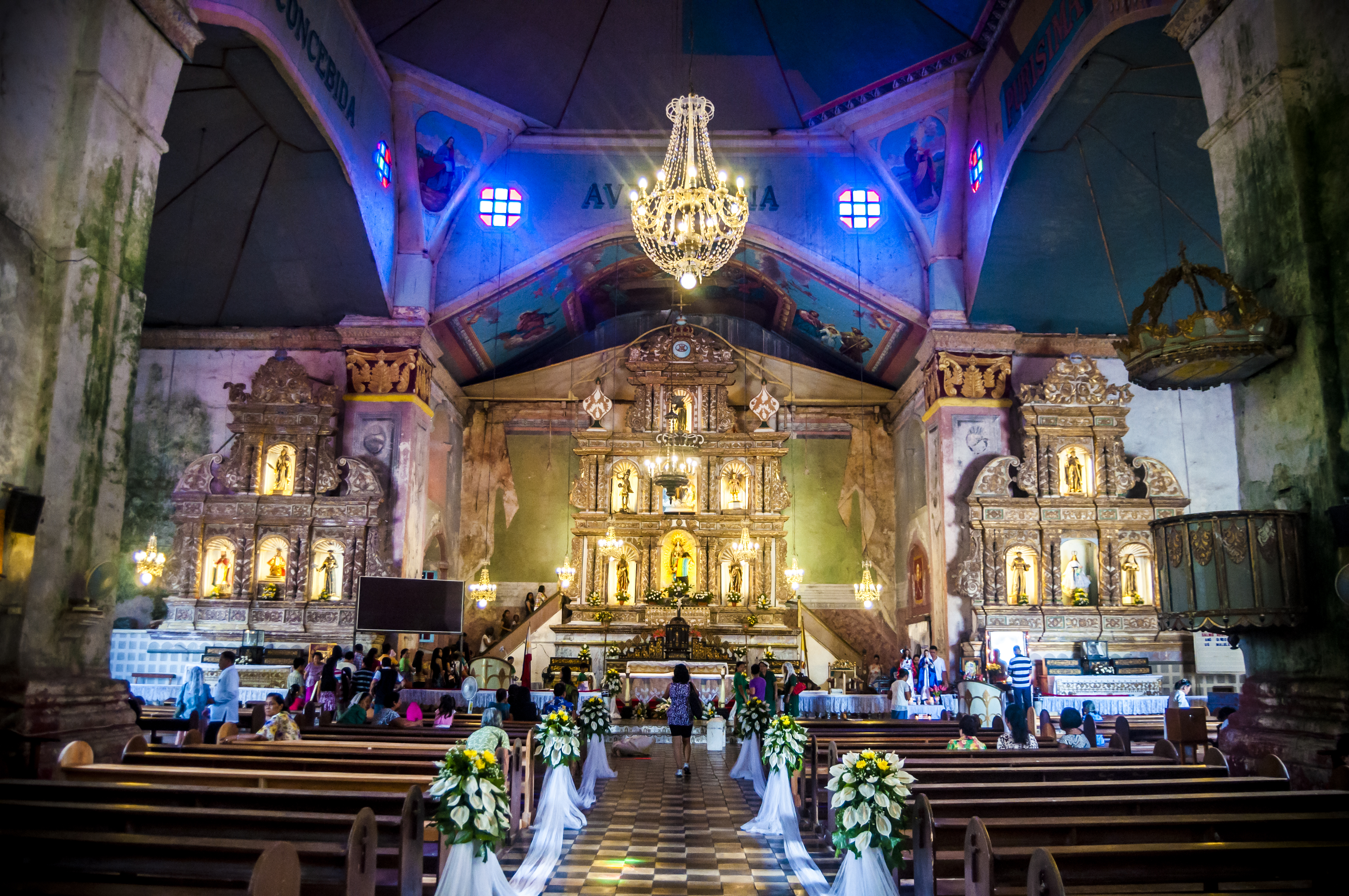
Baclayon church (during a wedding)

Baclayon is known for its historic Catholic church, declared a National Cultural Treasure in 1995 because it is considered the best preserved of its kind in the region. Its first structure was built in 1595, but the current building is from 1724 and is of Spanish Colonial architecture. The church includes a small museum, with relics dating back to the early 16th century, and adjoining 21-metre (69 ft) high bell tower. Nearby are centuries-old stone buildings like the hermita, and elementary school, as well as the historic public marketplace, a Spanish-era building with giant stone columns supporting the roof. In 2013, the church and bell tower were severely damaged by the 2013 Bohol earthquake.

Baclayon ancestral houses along the Tagbilaran East Road

There are 67 or more Spanish colonial ancestral houses in the municipality, many of them along the main road. The houses, in various stages of preservation or neglect, show Spanish-Filipino wooden craftsmanship and styling, some of which were constructed as early as 1853. They are often utilized for cultural shows and tours, festivals and fiestas, as well as some having been turned into inns.

The island of Pamilacan is a tourist destination for dolphin- and whale-watching.

== See also ==
- Churches in Bohol

== Sources ==
- Hellingman, Jeroen (4 April 2002). "A Short History of Bohol". www.bohol.ph. Archived from the original on 3 June 2004.
