= Bradford Memorial Chapel =

Church in Cebu City, Philippines

- Matilda Bradford Memorial Chapel
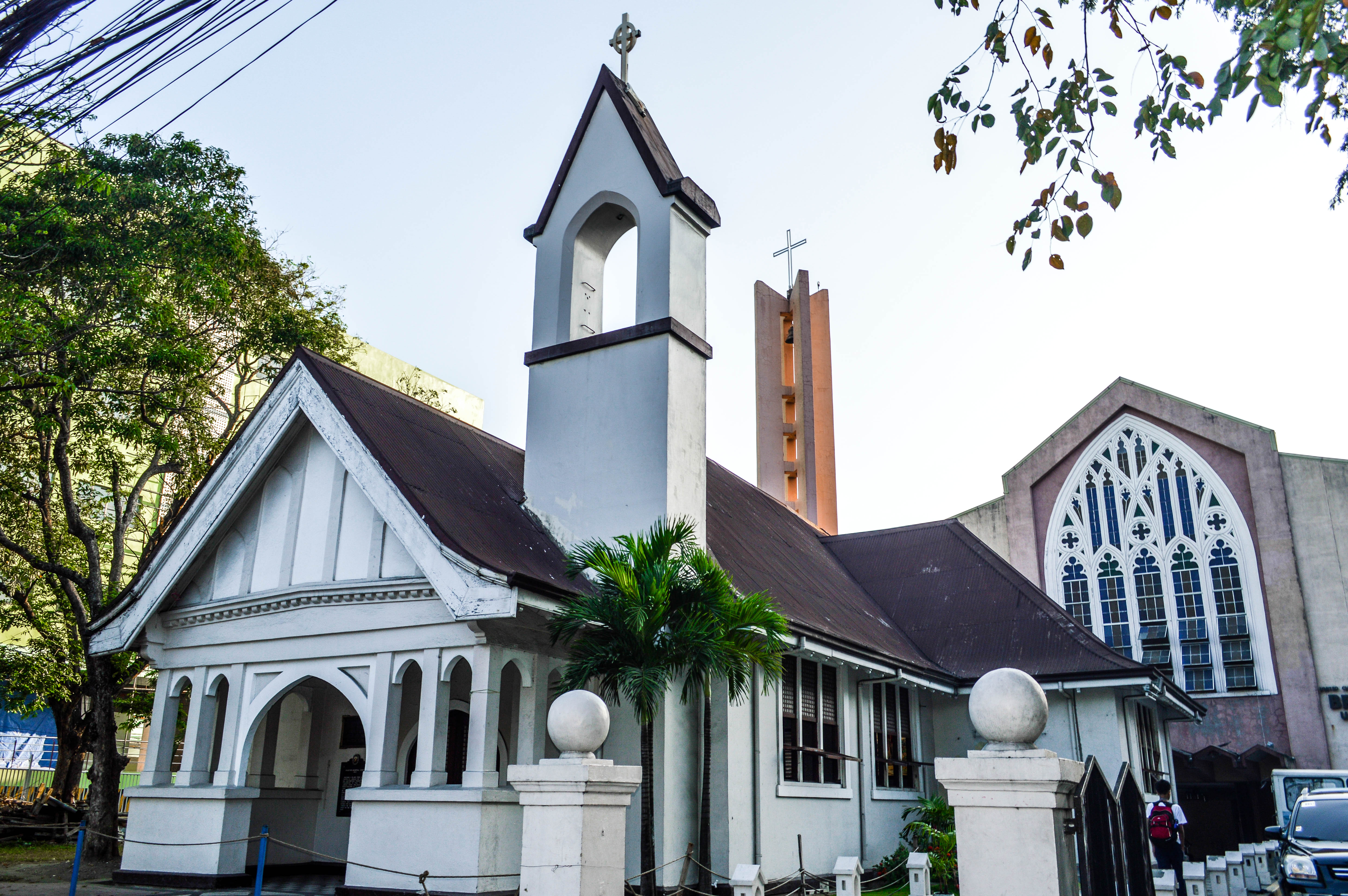
- Matilda Bradford Memorial Chapel
- Bradford Memorial Chapel
- 10°18′21.06″N 123°53′42.4″E
- Location: Osmeña Boulevard, Cebu City
- Country: Philippines
- Denomination: Presbyterian
- Religious order: United Church of Christ in the Philippines

History
- Status: Church
- Founded: 1902
- Founder: Paul Frederic Jansen

Architecture
- Functional status: Active
- Heritage designation: National Historical Landmark
- Designated: 1984
- Architectural type: Chapel
- Years built: 1912–1913
- Completed: 1913

Bradford Memorial Chapel, also known as Matilda Bradford Memorial Chapel, is a Protestant church located in Cebu City, Philippines. Built in 1913, it is the only Protestant church in Cebu declared as a national historical landmark by the National Historical Commission of the Philippines.

== Design ==
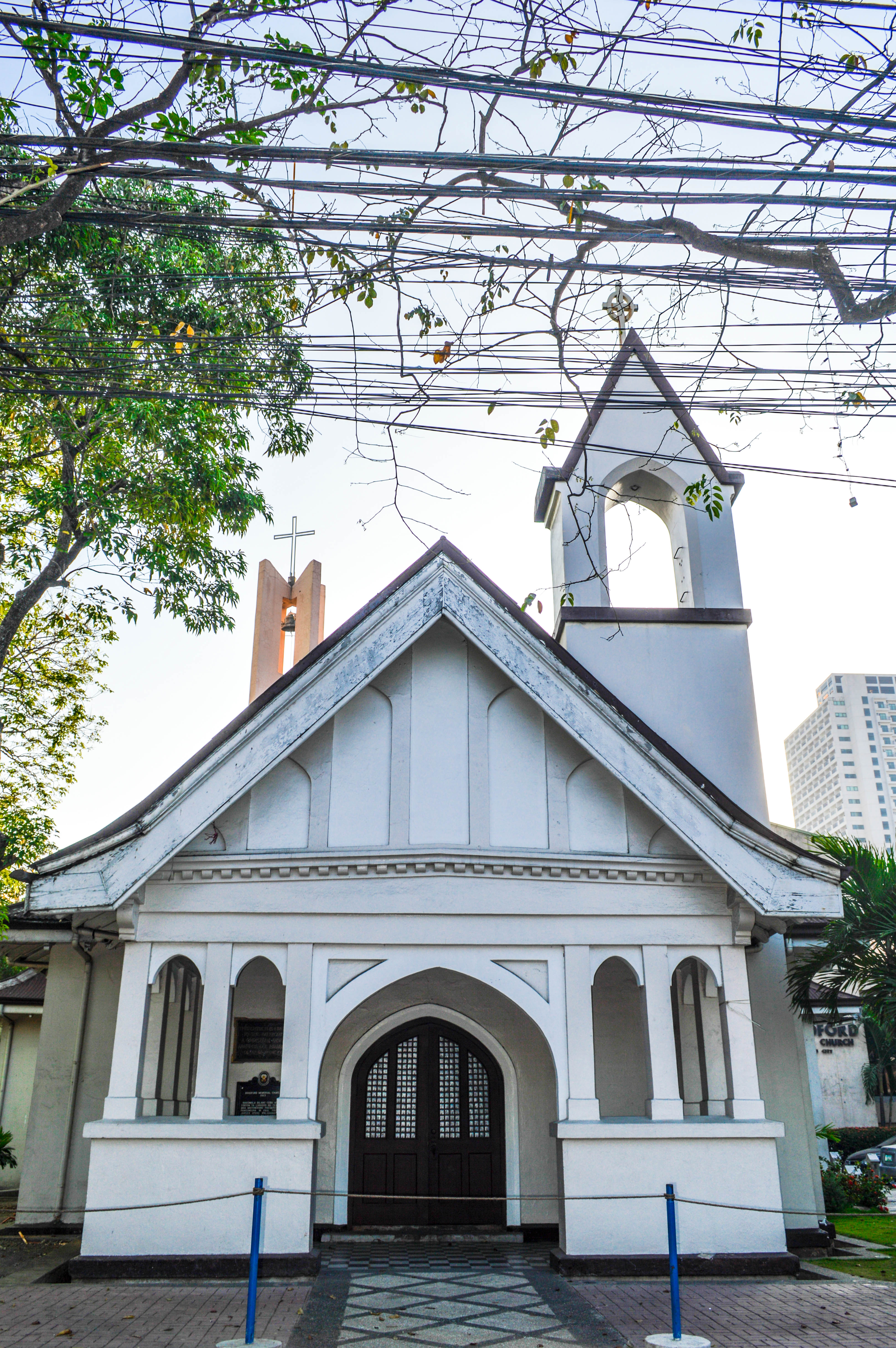
Matilda Bradford Memorial Chapel

The Bradford Memorial Chapel is managed by the United Church of Christ in the Philippines. It is constructed in a cruciform shape and located along Osmeña Boulevard, beside the Visayas Community Medical Center. Behind it, a new, bigger church was built.

== History ==
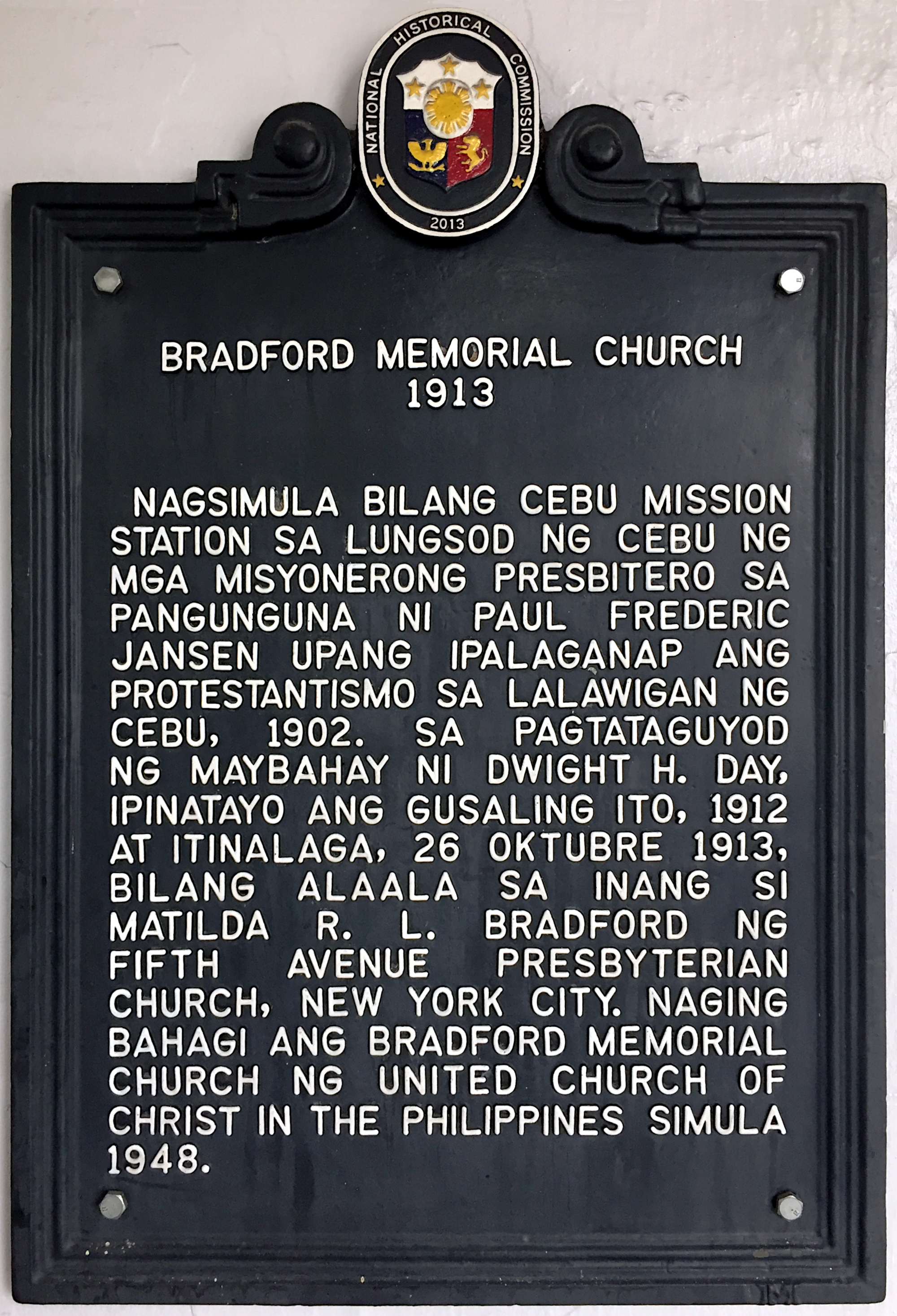
NHCP historical marker installed in 2013

The Board of Foreign Missions of the Presbyterian Church of the United States acquired the three-hectare property on which the church stands, which was then a remote area away from the old city that was predominantly Roman Catholic. Considered as the oldest Presbyterian church in Cebu, its construction began in 1912 and was completed on October 26, 1913. It was donated by Dwight H. Day's wife and named after her mother, Matilda L. Bradford. (Day was the treasurer of the Board of Foreign Missions.) The surrounding structures, such as the Emerson Dormitory (a dormitory for girls), Sneed Dormitory (a separate dormitory for boys), and two residences, that were constructed around the same time did not survive the American bombings during World War II.

Dedicated for the adherents of Protestant faith in the province, the church had interpreters assist religious services that were heard in Cebuano and Chinese.

The church later provided relief to people who were afflicted with leprosy but chose to stay in Cebu instead of moving to Palawan's Culion Leper Colony. In 1948, the community established the Student Christian Center with the goal of providing basic education and forwarding English language teaching. The school was later renamed Cebu Christian School and presently, the Philippine Christian Gospel School.

A plan for the church's demolition that was drawn up in the 1980s was not implemented due to the opposition by some of the council members. On September 27, 2013, a fundraising campaign was conducted for church renovation purposes in time of its centennial anniversary.

== National historical landmark ==
In 1983, the Cebu City Council declared it as a historical landmark and a year later, it was recognized as a national historical landmark by the National Historical Commission, becoming the only Protestant church in Cebu to be conferred with the designation. In 2013 on occasion of the church's centennial celebration, a historical marker was unveiled.
