= Museo Sugbo =

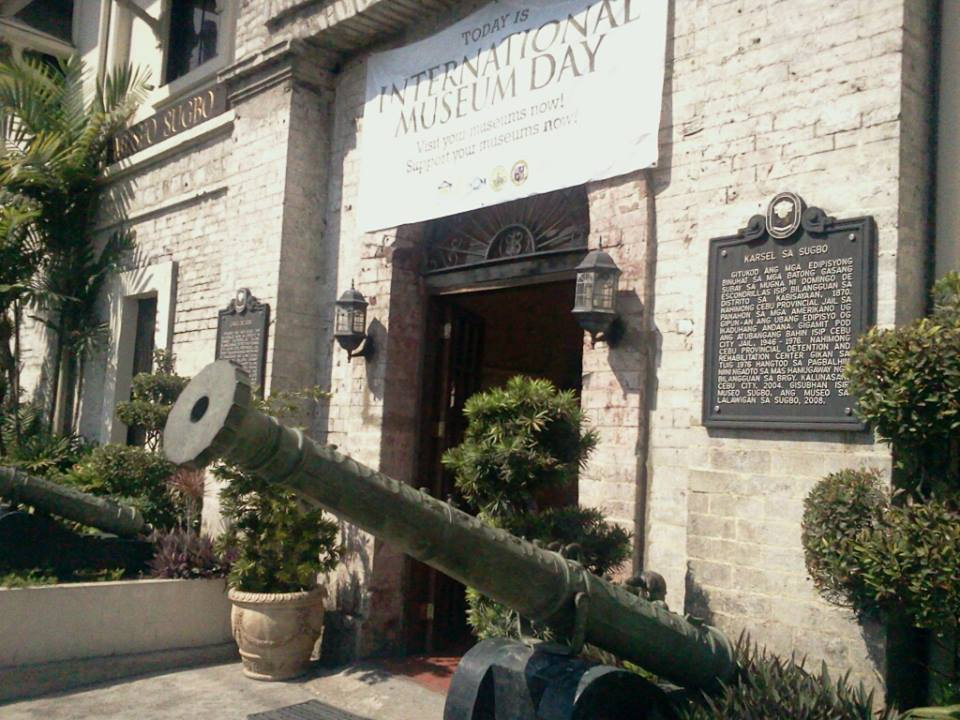
- Façade of Museo Sugbo (2013)
- Established: August 5, 2008
- Location: M.J. Cuenco Avenue, Brgy. Tejero, Cebu City, Philippines
- Coordinates: 10°18′N 123°54′E
- Type: History museum
- Collections: The Pre-Colonial Gallery; The Spanish Colonial Gallery; The Katipunan Revolution and the American Colonial Gallery; The War Memorial Gallery; Gregorio and Jovito Abellana Special Exhibition; Vicente Rama Special Exhibition; The National Museum Gallery; Cebu Journalism and Journalist Gallery
- Architect: Domingo de Escondrillas
- Owner: Provincial government of Cebu
- Public transit access: 01K Urgello; 02B Pier; 03A 03B 03L Mabolo; 10H Bulacao, Pardo; 22D Mandaue; MB SM City Cebu, SM Seaside City, Anjo World; KMK Minglanilla, Naga
- Parking: Along the street

Museo Sugbo (lit. 'Cebu Museum') is a museum in Cebu City, Philippines. The museum is located in the former Cebu Provincial Detention and Rehabilitation Center (CPDRC) jail, and is located four blocks away from Plaza Independencia. The museum is owned by the Cebu provincial government.

== History ==
=== As a prison ===
Museo Sugbo is housed in what was once called Cárcel de Cebú, the provincial jail of Cebu.

Designed in 1869 by Domingo de Escondrillas, the lone architect in Cebu at the time, the Cárcel de Cebú was originally proposed as the Cárcel del Distrito, the main prison for the Visayas District. This accounts for its relatively large size at the time it was built. After a flurry of endorsements and independent review in Manila, the project was approved and construction commenced around 1871. It is believed that most of the coral stone blocks from the Parian church – which was demolished in 1878 after the Bishop of Cebu won a long-drawn court case against its parishioners in the 1850s – were used to build parts of the cárcel. After twenty years of use, a renovation was ordered in 1892, which added more buildings behind the main structure that now serves as the first six galleries of the museum.

Records are not clear as to when the second storey of the main building was added, but the architectural design suggests this to be during the American colonial period.

The gaol housed not only criminals in its 140+ year history. During the revolution, many of the Katipuneros were incarcerated here without trial and many of them were eventually executed in nearby Carreta cemetery. During the early years of the American period, the gaol served as a stable for horses competing at the hipódromo (racetrack) nearby, but it was eventually used once again as a prison, both for the city and the province. During the Japanese occupation, guerrillas were imprisoned here after enduring torture under the hands of the Kempeitai, the Japanese secret police. After the war, many of the collaborators in Cebu were also imprisoned here. From the 1950s to 1976, the front section of the gaol served as the city jail, while the three structures behind were used as the provincial jail.

The cárcel changed names twice, first during the American through the post-War periods when it was called the Cebu Provincial Jail. In the 1980s, the name was changed to Cebu Provincial Detention and Rehabilitation Center (CPDRC).

=== Cárcel de Cebú as Museo Sugbo ===
Following the transfer of CPDRC to a more spacious and modern prison complex in December 2004 the gaol was converted into Museo Sugbo, the repository of Cebuano heritage, a feat that was realised when the first four galleries of the museum were inaugurated on August 5, 2008.

On August 13, 2009, Cebu governor Gwendolyn Garcia and Dr. Ambeth Ocampo, chair of the National Historical Institute, led dignitaries in unveiling a National Historical Marker at Museo Sugbo. They also inaugurated the Visayas Branch of the Museum of Philippine Political History. Directly opposite this branch museum, the governor and National Museum director Corazon Alvina also inaugurated the National Museum Cebu Branch Galleries. Both museum branches occupy separate buildings within the Museo Sugbo complex. Two special exhibitions were also inaugurated during this event: Sen. Vicente Rama Memorabilia and the Gregorio and Jovito Abellana Memorabilia, in two separate galleries.

Also inaugurated during this event was the Well of Good Fortune and Happiness on a Spanish-era well that was unearthed when the rear portion of the Museo Sugbo complex was being refurbished in 2009. At the same time four more galleries were added to the Museo, bringing the total to 10. Two more galleries are currently being developed with inauguration set for 2010: a Provincial Art Gallery and the Cebu Media Gallery. A reproduction of prison life is also being planned within one of the bartolinas (isolation cells) in the former prison complex, another of which is being developed into a gift shop.

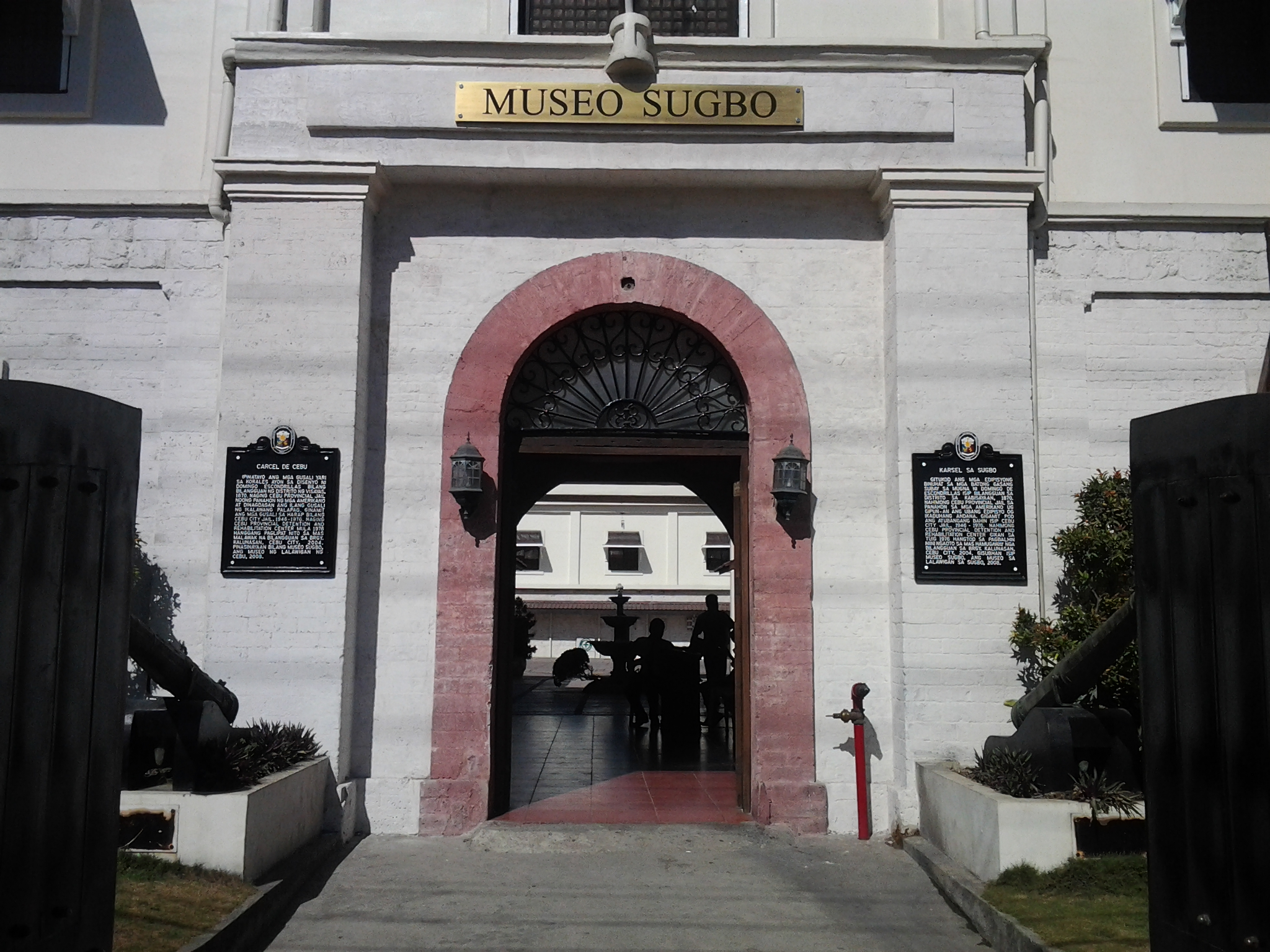
Museo Sugbo Entrance

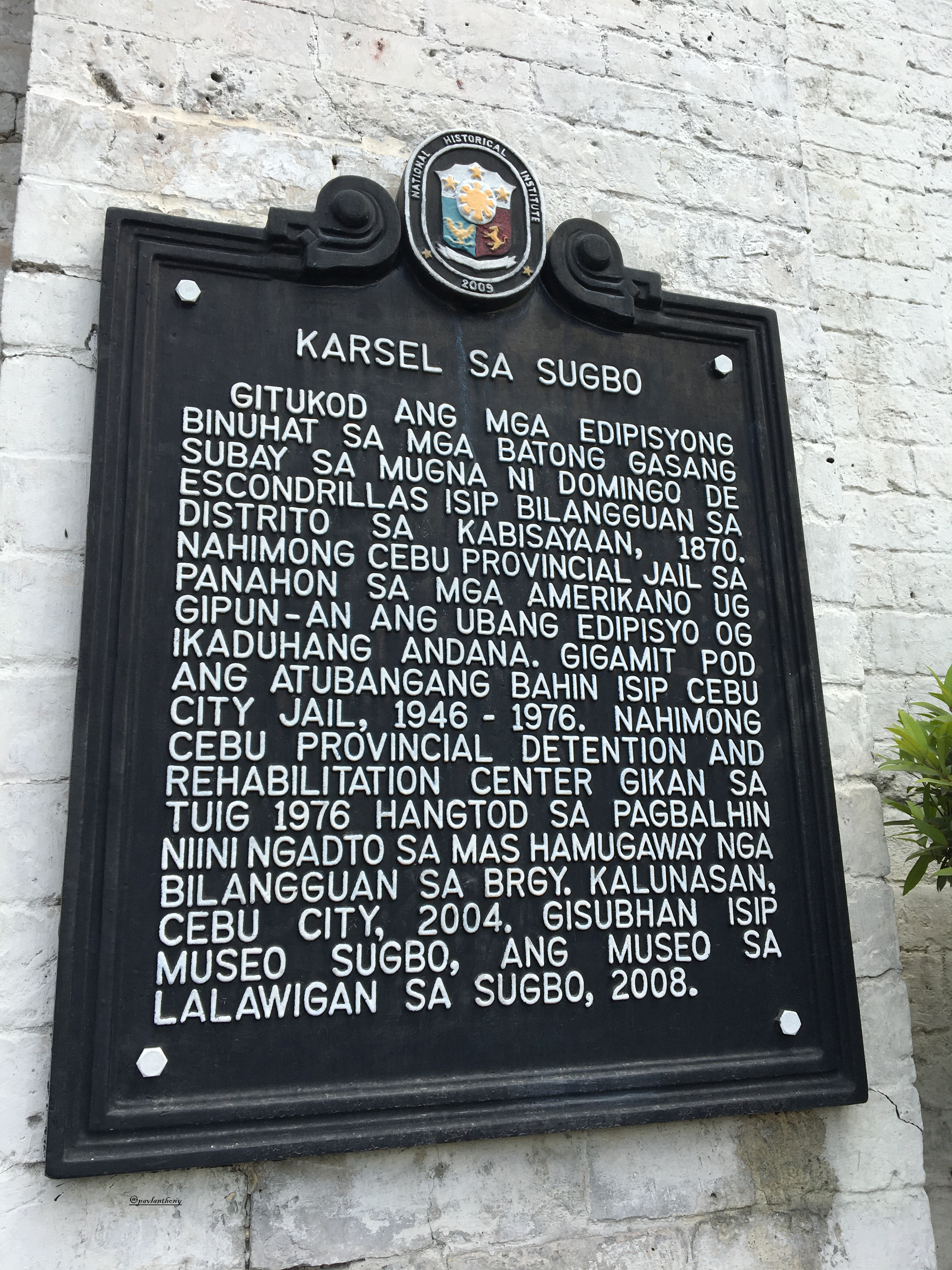
Historical marker of Museo Sugbo written in Cebuano Language

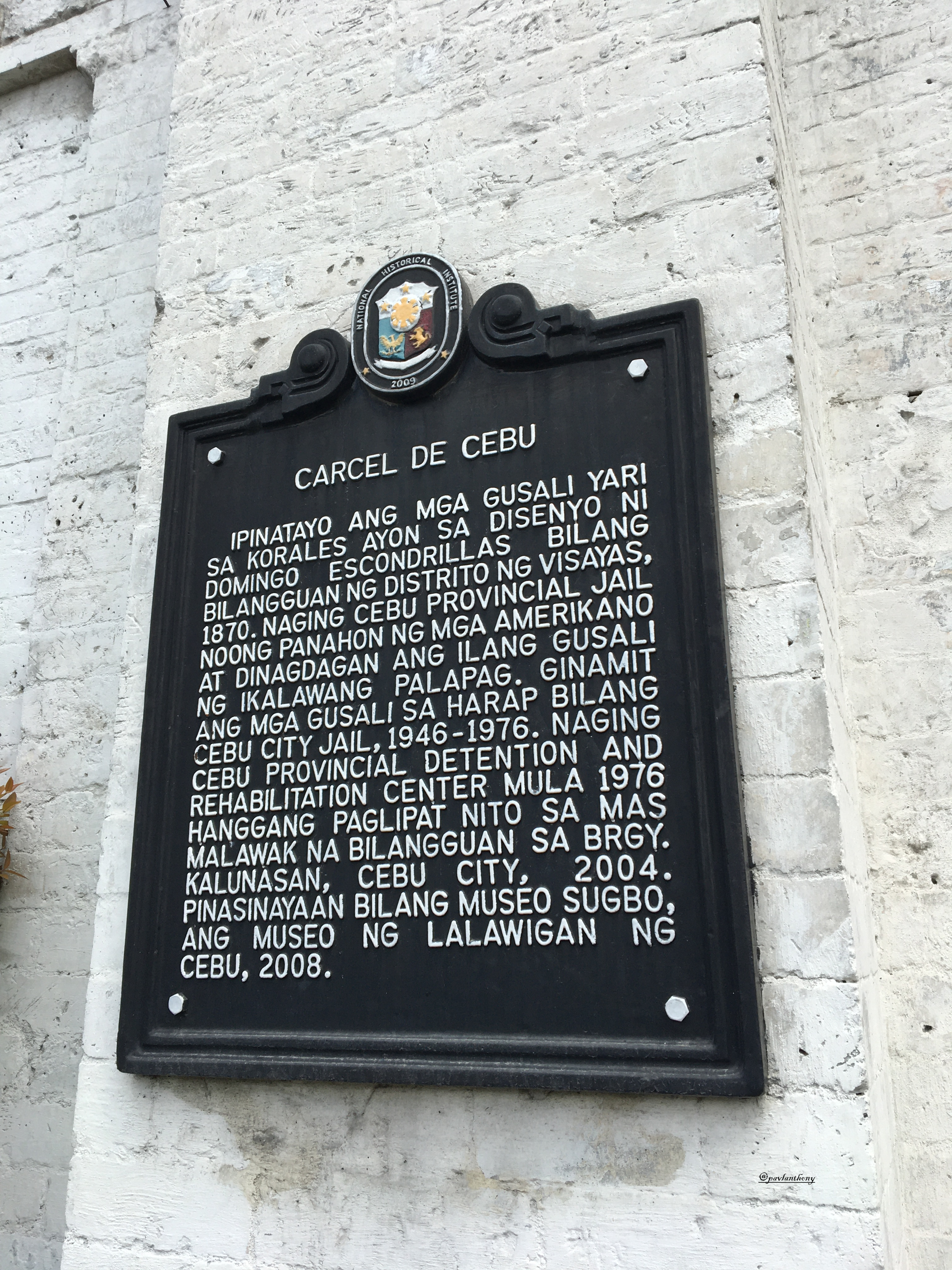
Historical marker of Museo Sugbo written in Filipino Language
