= Argao Church =

Roman Catholic church in Cebu, Philippines

- Archdiocesan Shrine and Parish of Saint Michael the Archangel; Archdiocesan Shrine of San Miguel Arcangel
- Saint Michael the Archangel Parish
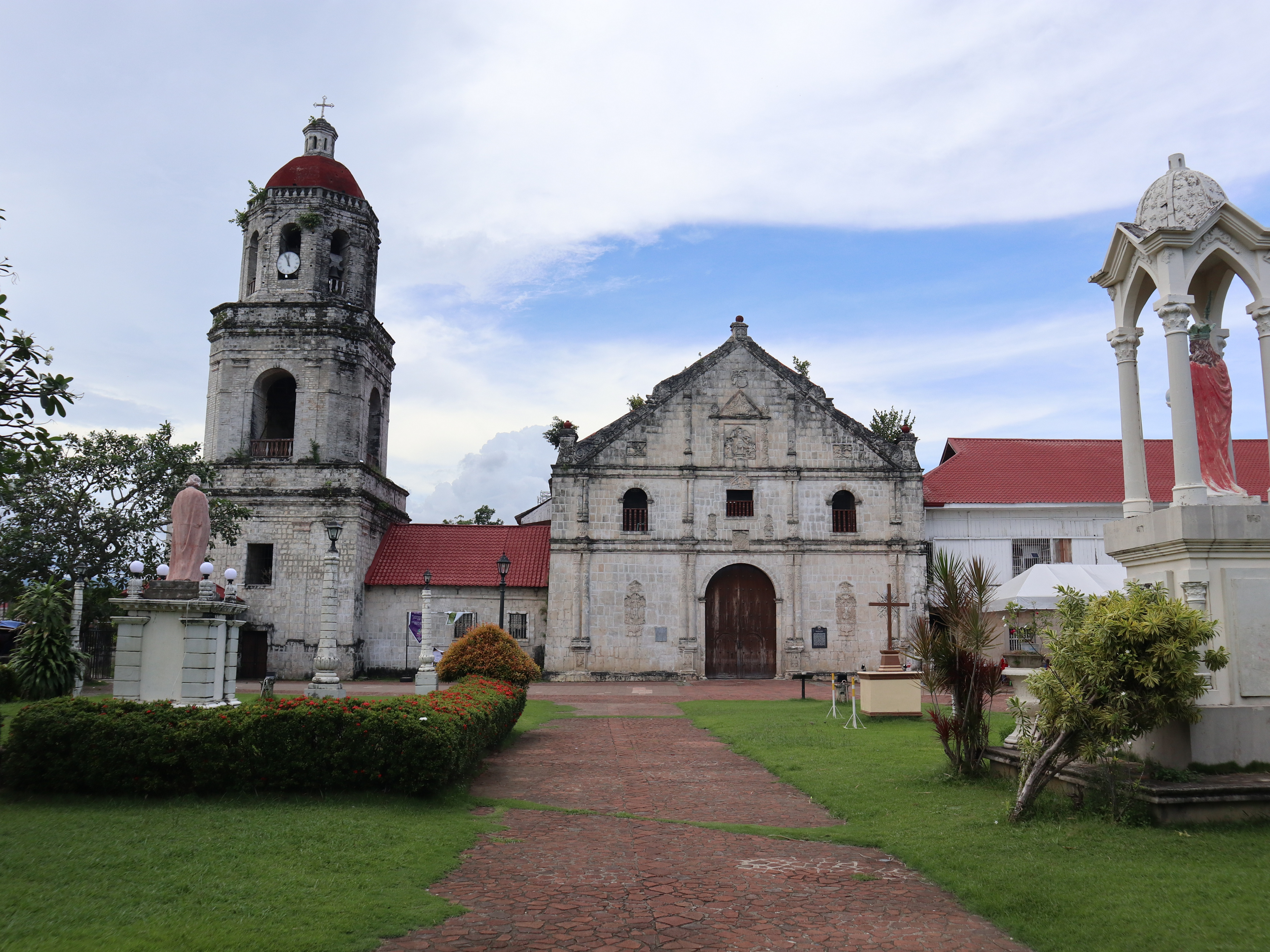
- Church complex in 2023

- Location in Cebu Location in the Visayas Location in the Philippines
- 9°52′55″N 123°36′28″E
- Location: Poblacion, Argao, Cebu
- Country: Philippines
- Denomination: Roman Catholic

History
- Status: Parish church
- Founded: 1703
- Dedication: St. Michael the Archangel

Architecture
- Functional status: Active
- Heritage designation: National Historical Landmark
- Architectural type: Church building
- Style: Baroque
- Groundbreaking: 1703
- Completed: 1788

Specifications
- Materials: Sand, gravel, cement, wood, mortar and bricks

Administration
- Archdiocese: Cebu

Clergy
- Archbishop: Jose S. Palma
- Pastor(s): Rev. Fr. Antonio G. Zamora Jr., Rev. Fr. Calixto B. Apigo, Rev. Fr. Virgilio P. Paras Jr.

The Archdiocesan Shrine of San Miguel Arcangel, commonly known as Argao Church, is a Roman Catholic church in Argao, Cebu, Philippines. It is under the jurisdiction of the Archdiocese of Cebu. The municipality of Argao was established as a parish in 1703 under the Augustinian order. To serve the parochial needs of its people, a stone church was constructed in 1734 and was completed in 1788. The church was dedicated to Saint Michael the Archangel.

== Features ==
The coral stone church is a two-level structure with an imposing, highly ornate pediment and double-pilaster columns on its facade. Together with its convent, the church was fortified to also serve as refuge during Moro raids in the 18th and 19th century. The facade contains articulate carvings depicting the patron saint displayed on its niche, flanked by oversized urn-like finials standing on rectangular bases at each corner of the pediment.

The church follows the usual cruciform plan. The interior contains a single aisle with a double nave. Five retablos adorn its sanctuary and transept areas, with the main retablo (retablo mayor) containing 3 life-size statues of the three archangels: St. Michael, St. Raphael and St. Gabriel. The vaulted ceiling is made of wooden panels arranged longitudinally with details of seraphs protruding as corbels. Paintings depicting the life of the angels and archangels, plus several Biblical passages, adorn the ceiling surface—half of which were painted by the renowned master Cebuano painter Raymundo Francia, and the other half by an unknown Boholano artist. According to Alicia M. L. Coseteng, it has Tequitqui influence which in an art style syncretizing Mexican and Spanish art.The Philippines is the only country settled by Latin Americans, especially by Mexicans in Asia.

Ceiling Paintings of Argao Church

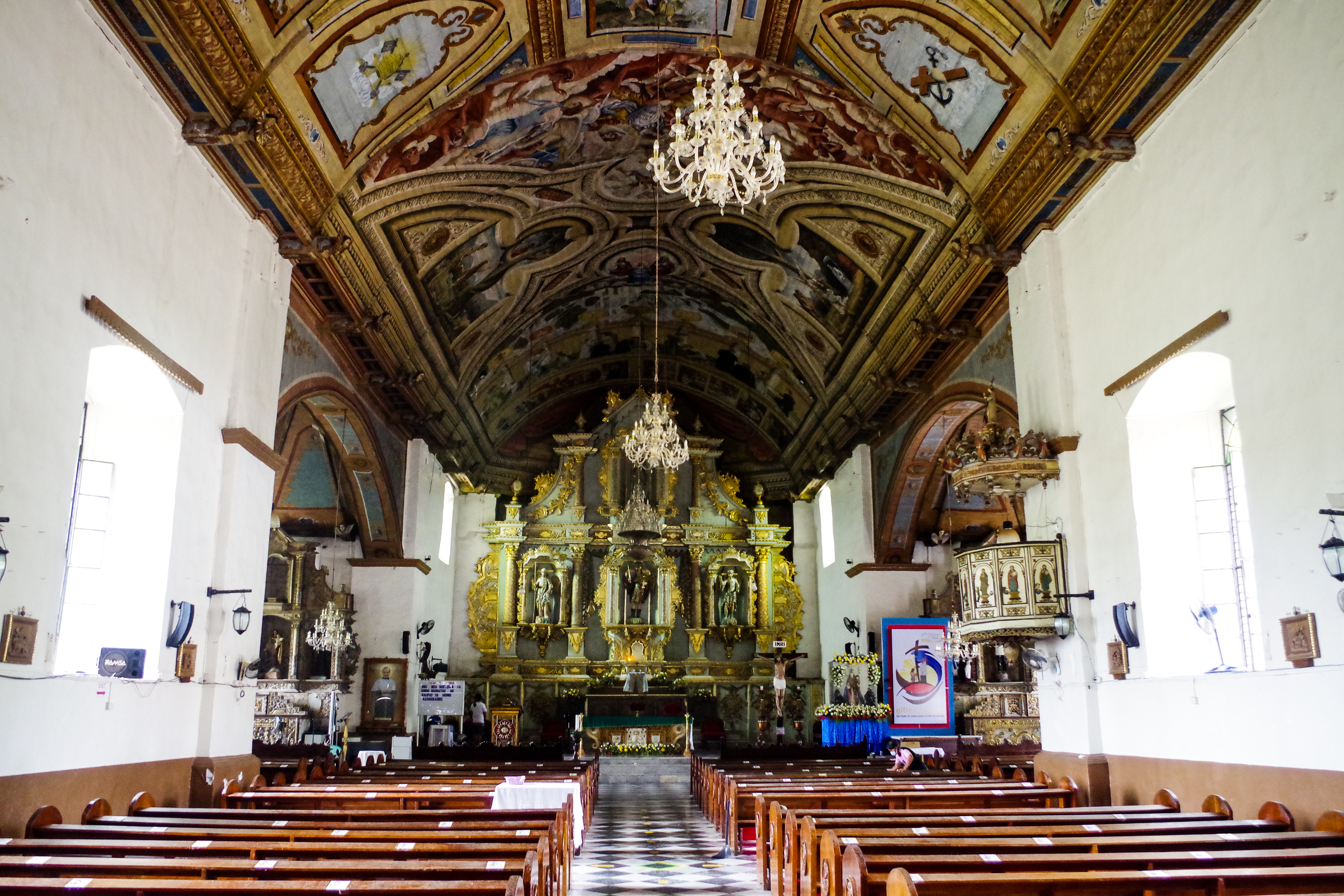
Church interior in 2022

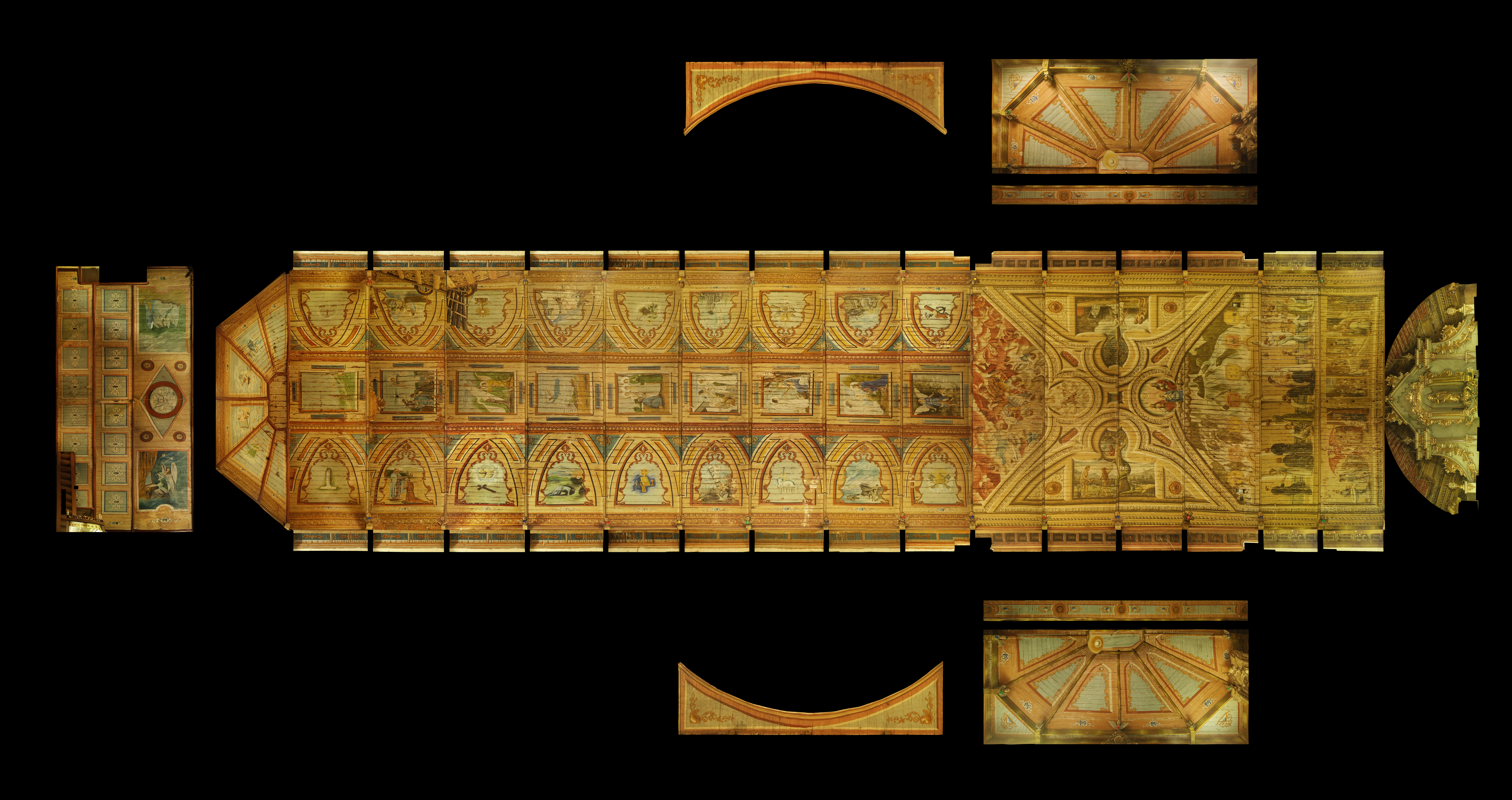
Ceiling Paintings of San Miguel Arcangel Parish Church, Argao, Cebu (100 dpi)

The bell tower has three levels supporting a single large bell on the second level, with 8 smaller bells on the third. The base of the belfry supports a square plan, while the second and third bases follow an octagonal plan, topped by a domed roof. The bell tower is connected to the church by a single-level baptistry.

The convent at the right side of the church served as a seminary during the early part of the 19th century. Today the convent serves as a home for the Pastors assigned in the parish. The basement or the 1st floor of the convent housed the parish office, and offices of the EMHC, Catechists and the Parish Youth Coordinating Council. Adjacent to the parish office is the Museo de la Parroquia de San Miguel, an ecclesiastical museum with a rich collection of artifacts which became a favorite of the balikbayans and tourists. At the left of the church structure is the site of the former town cemetery, which now serve as the church complex's Gethsemane garden.

=== Baluarte ===
There are two watchtowers built within the church complex: one at the front of the church and the other at the back. The front watchtower served as the first line of defense during Moro raids, and is integrated within the complex's fortified walls. The one at the back, which is already a ruin, has a circular plan, and was built using river stones and utilizing riprap construction.

=== Church plaza ===
The plaza is bound by a short coral stone wall, where processions start and end during religious and festive rites. The plaza contains three statues mounted on pedestals with light posts. The plaza used to have clay tiles on its grounds, plus a big wooden evangelization cross mounted at the center. Adorning the coral stone walls are the 14 high reliefs of the Via Crucis, depicted using symbolisms on each station, which is unique and highly unusual in the country.

=== Gates and walls ===
The gates and walls were built around the time of the construction of the church to provide defense against the Moro invaders. The walls were made thick so that lookouts can walk on top of the walls. The coral stone barriers were carved with floral reliefs on certain sections. The entranceway has rectangular overhead beams that span the width of the passageway, wide enough to allow sentries to walk across. Each of the gateway columns feature stairs for access to another part of the wall. The four gateways are located on each of the four sides of the perimeter of the fortification.

=== Site of the Former Palacio ===
This L-shaped building was called by the townsfolk as the Palacio, where Spanish dignitaries and priests from the city stay during their visits. During the American era, the building was used as an elementary school. The building was burned by the Japanese during the Second World War. Today, the Palacio is now the Court of Justice.

=== Mortuary chapel ===
Beside the front entrance of the fortified church complex is a single level, coral-stone structure built together with the church. It was used as a leprosarium during the Spanish period and as an autopsy area for those who died tragically during the American era. The facade's pediment features very ornate carvings of angels and human figures, with skull and bone details that explain the function of the structure.

== Gallery ==
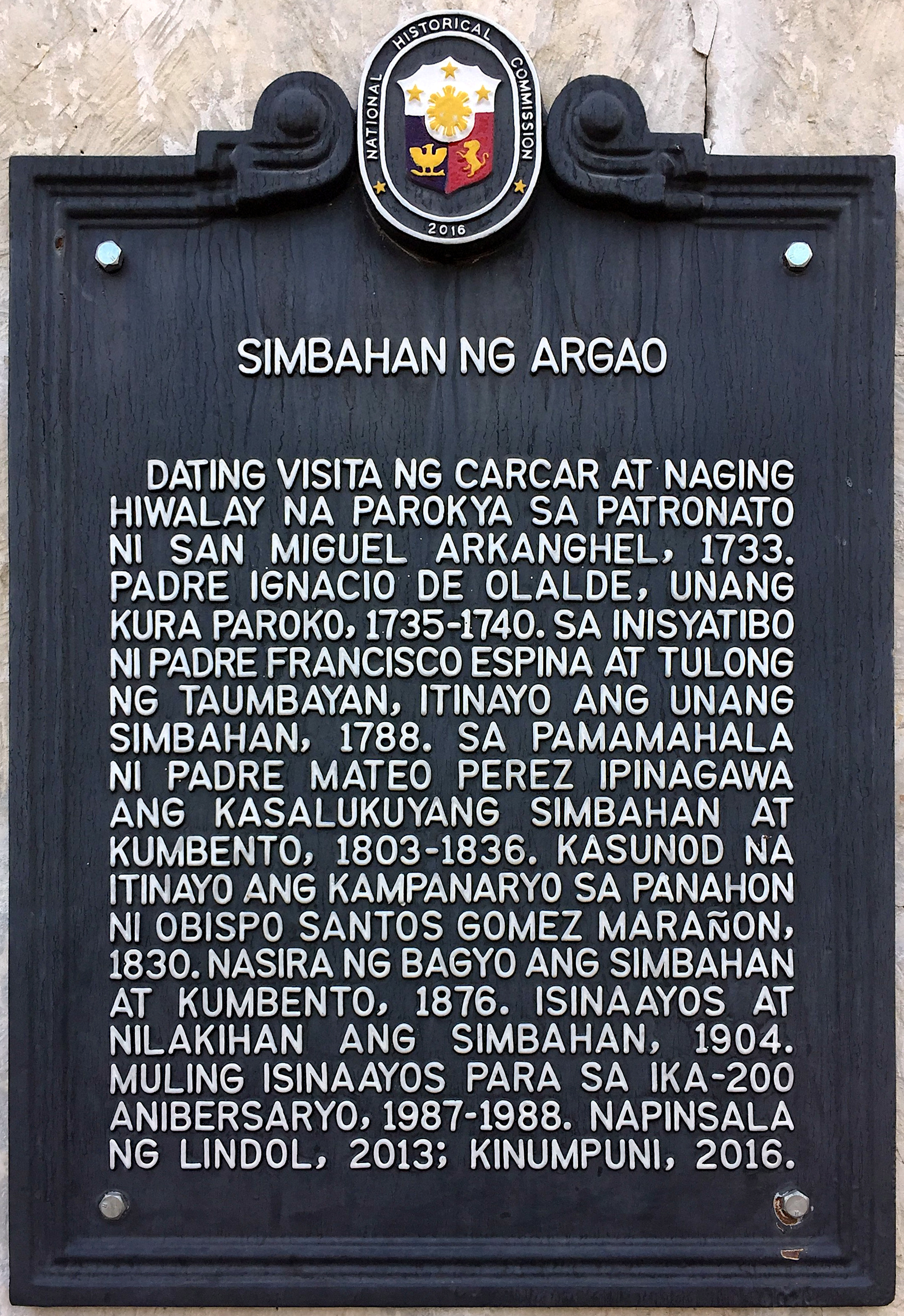
Church NHC historical marker installed in 2016

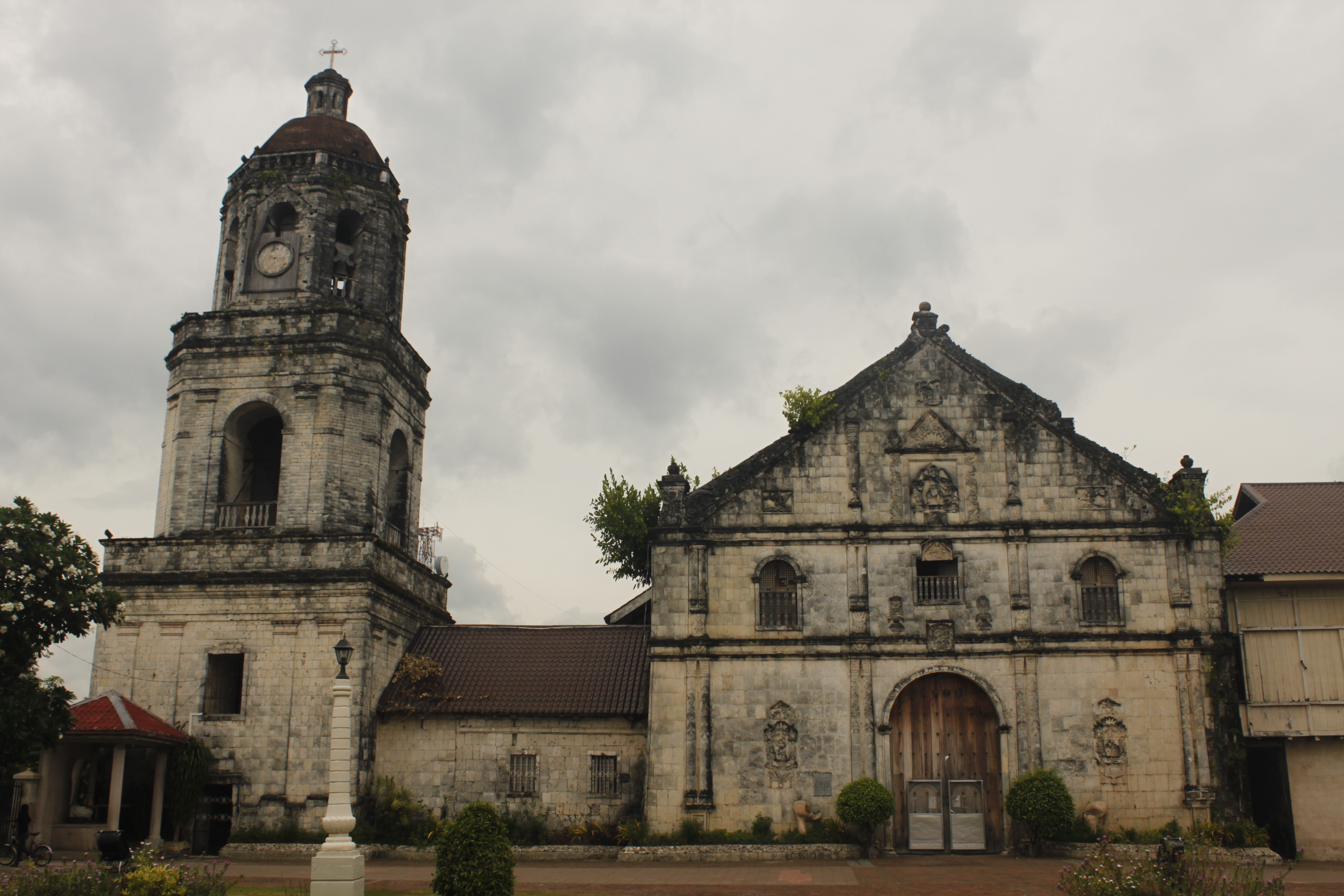
Church facade and belfry

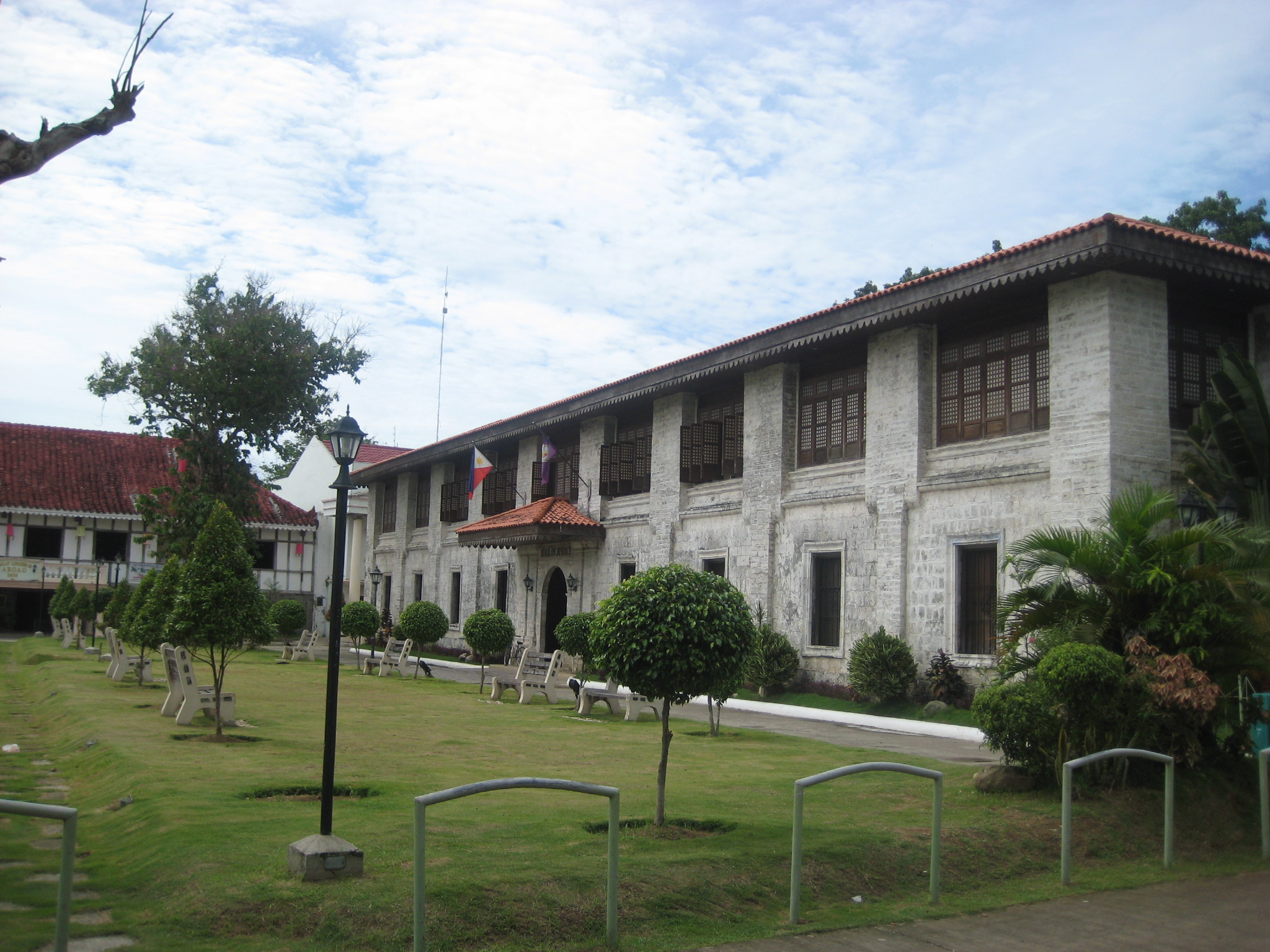
Site of the former palacio, now the Courts of Justice

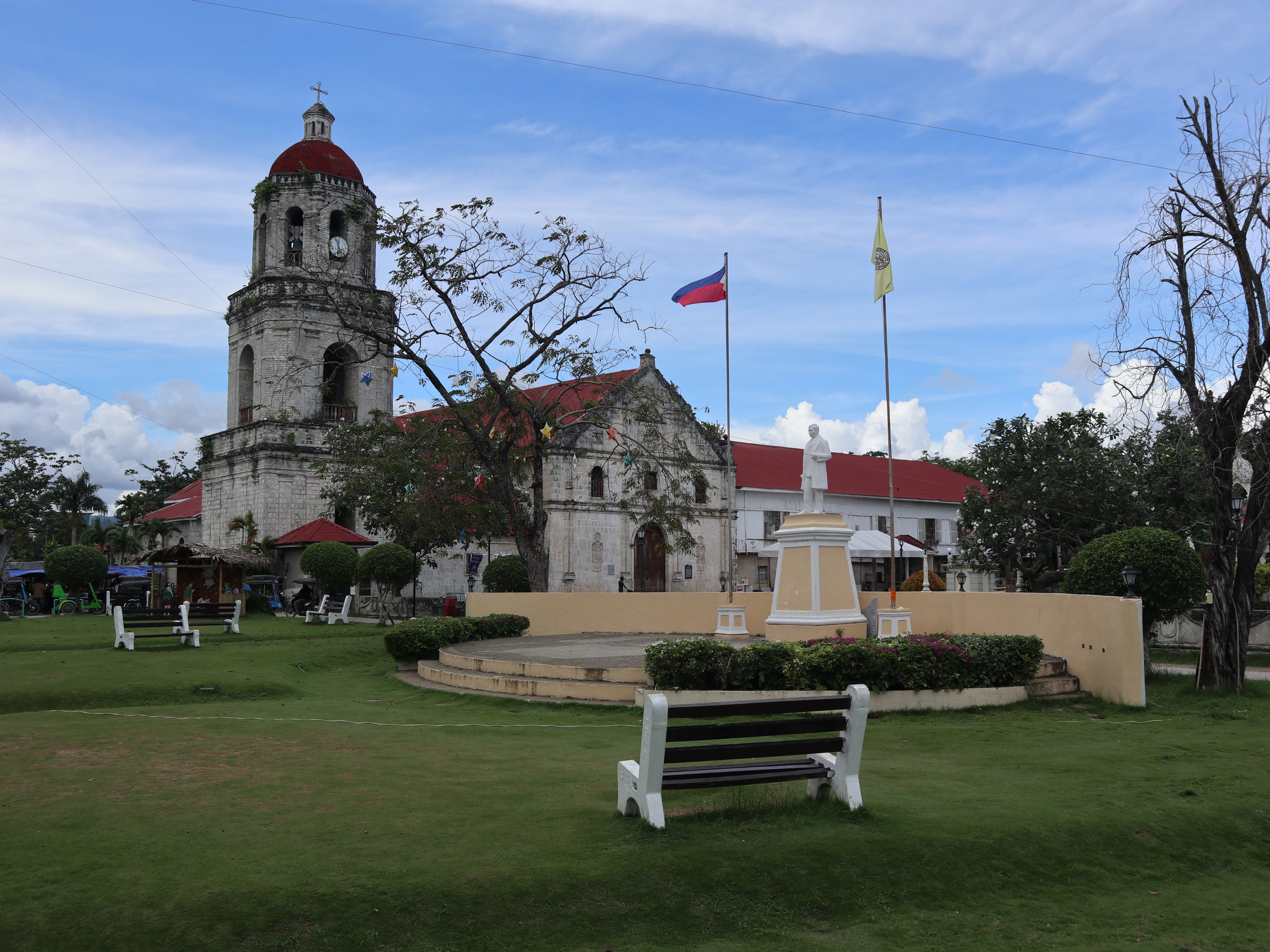
The church seen from the town plaza

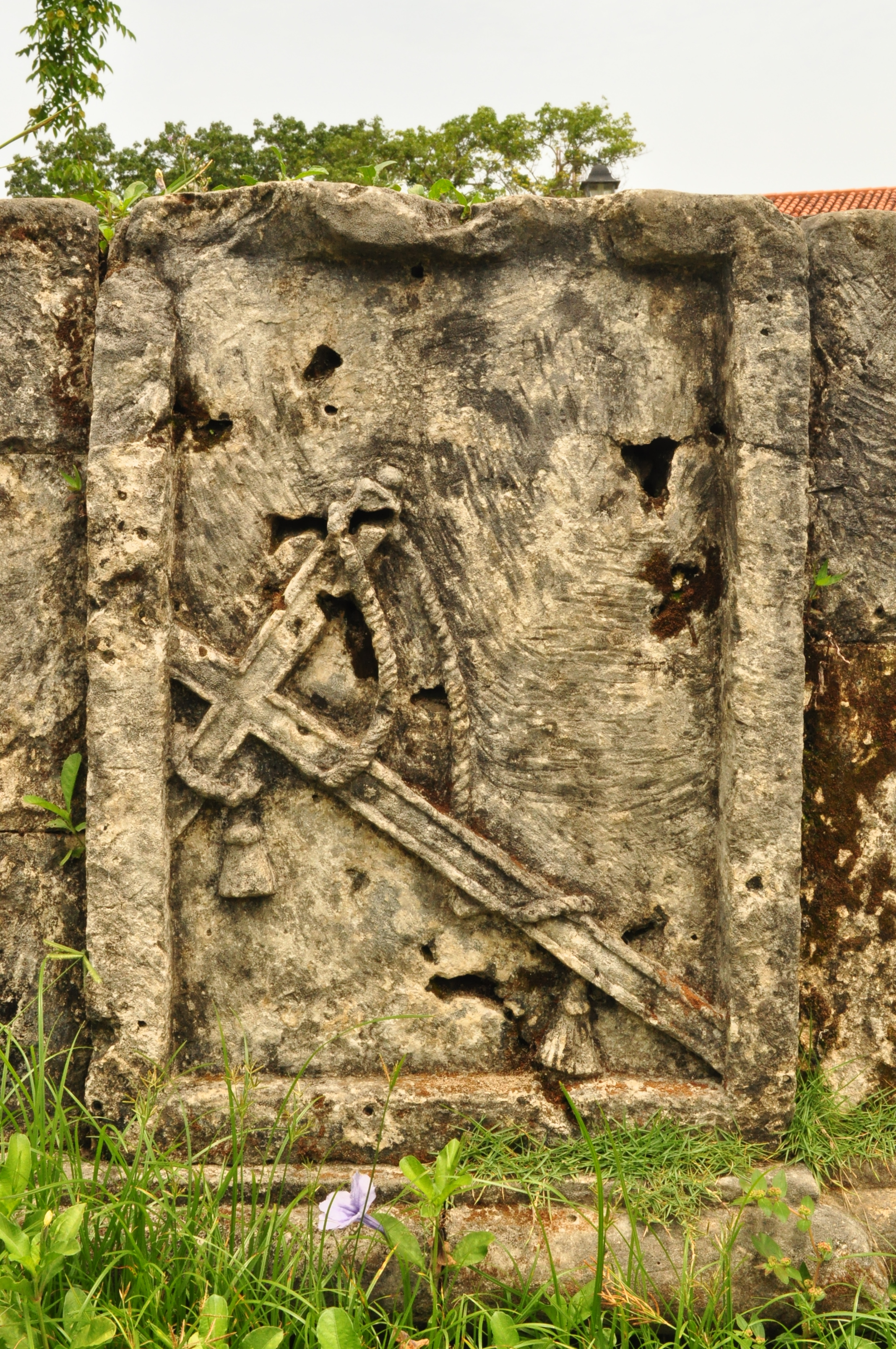
One of the Via Crucis high relieves inside the church plaza
