= Panglao =

Panglao may refer to either:

- Panglao, Bohol
- Panglao Island, on which the above municipality is located.
