= Panglao, Bohol =

Municipality in Bohol, Philippines

Panglao
- Municipality
- Municipality of Panglao
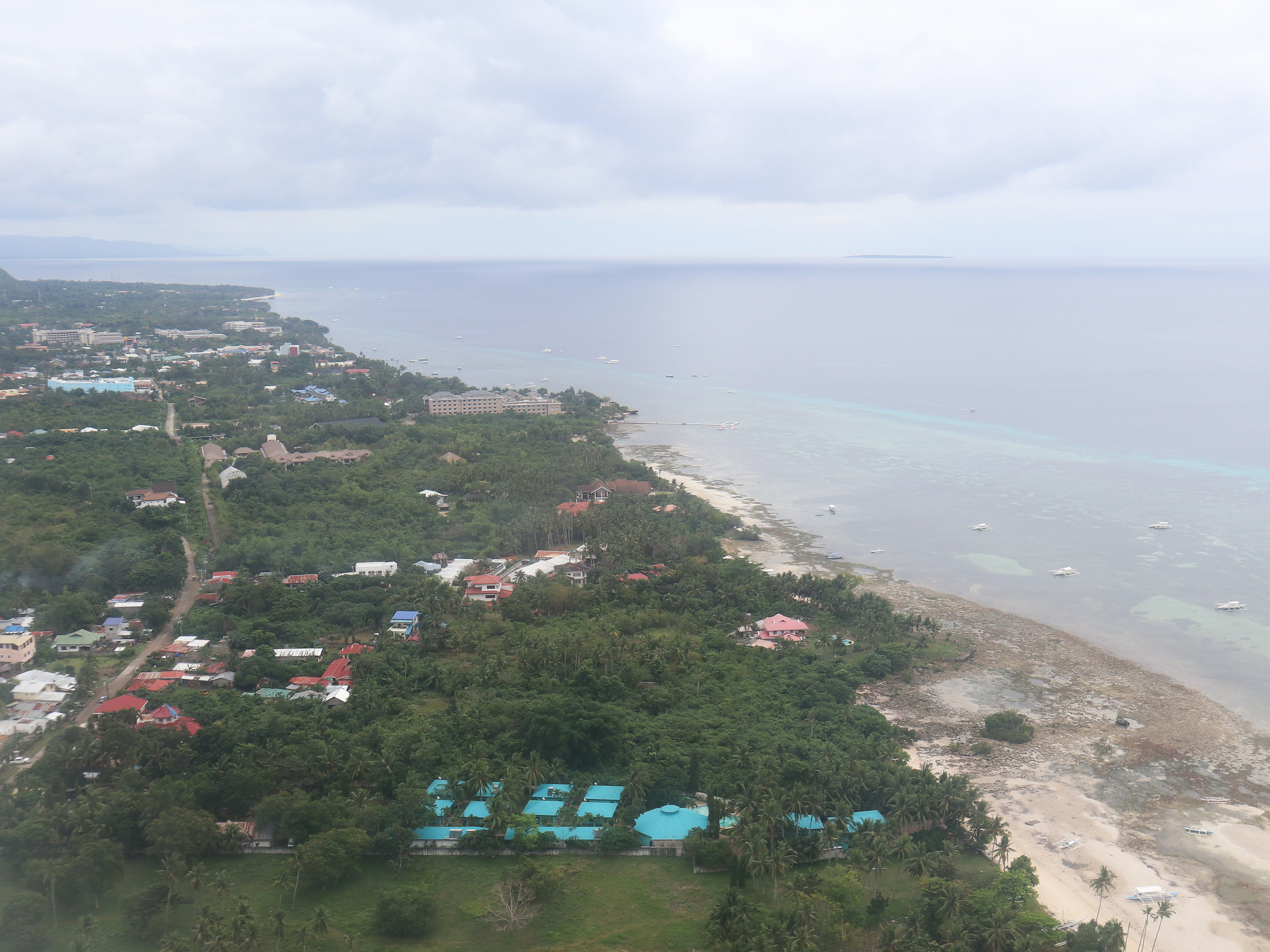
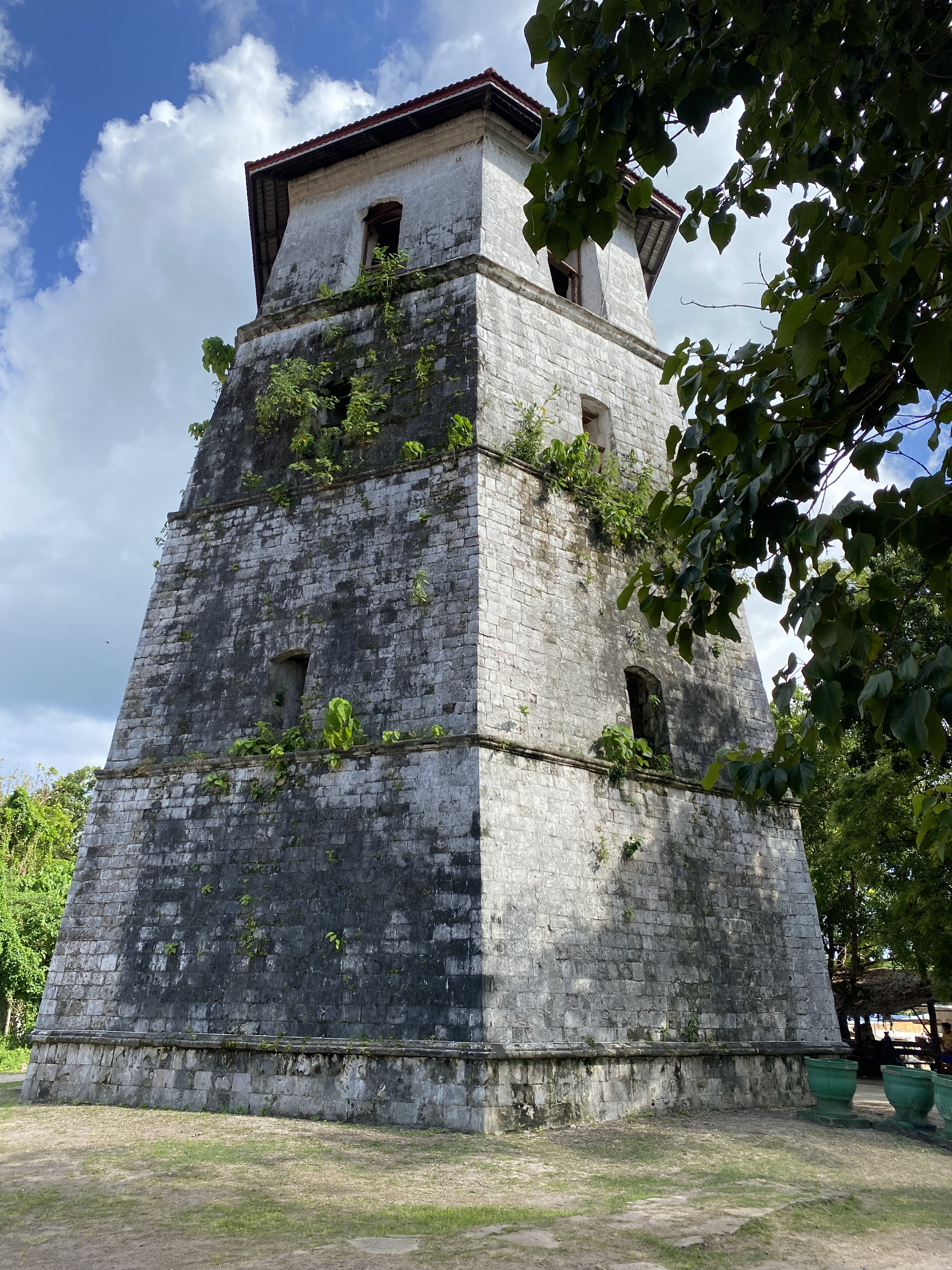
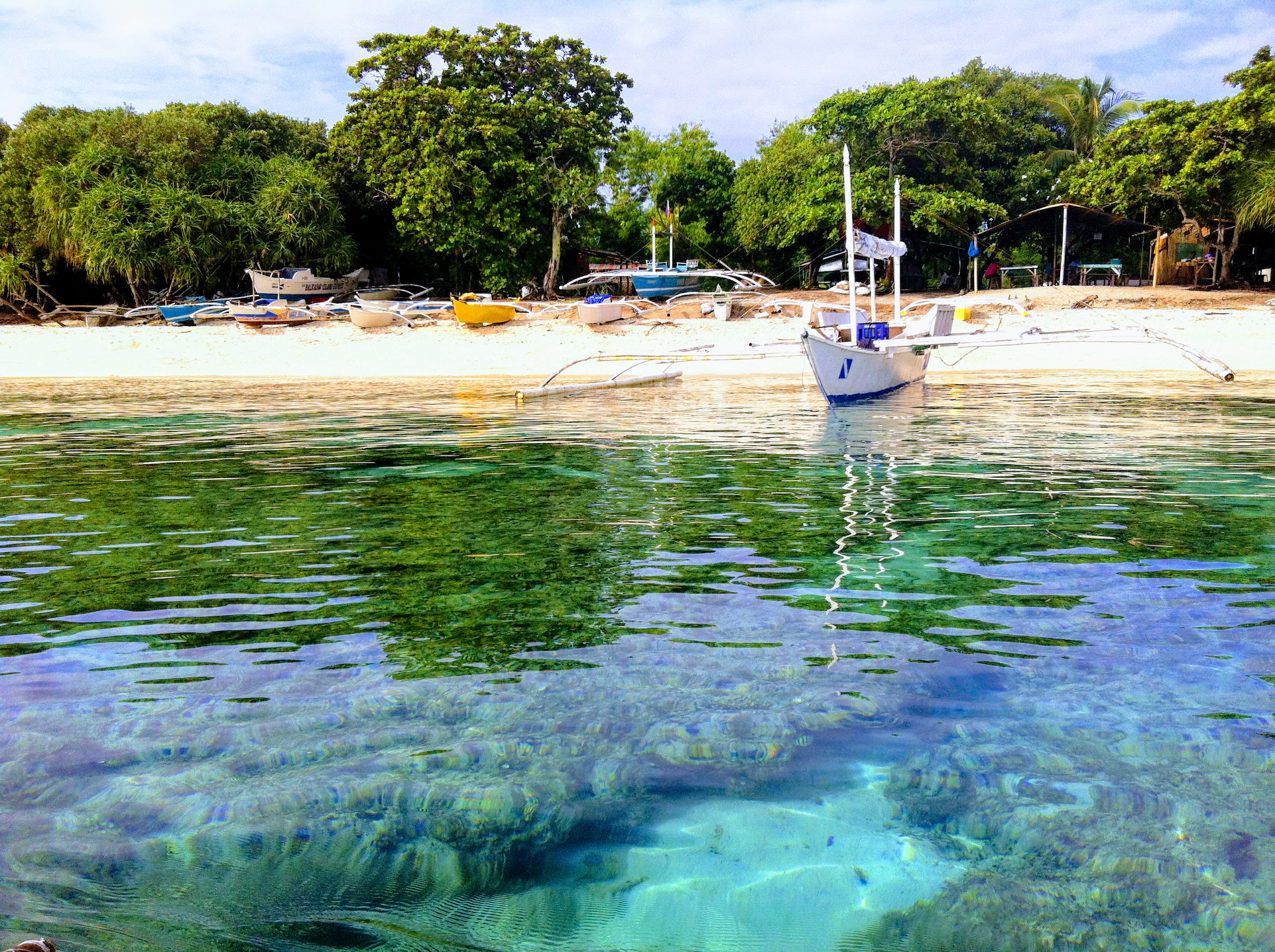
- Alona Beach from the air Panglao watchtower Balicasag Marine Sanctuary

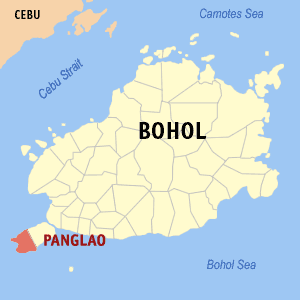
- Map of Bohol with Panglao highlighted
- Interactive map of Panglao
- Location within the Philippines
- Coordinates: 9°34′44″N 123°44′42″E
- Country: Philippines
- Region: Central Visayas
- Province: Bohol
- District: 1st district
- Founded: 1803
- Barangays: 10 (see Barangays)

Government
  - Type: Sangguniang Bayan
  - Mayor: Edgardo F. Arcay
  - Vice Mayor: Daisy M. Delambaca
  - Representative: John Geesnell Yap
  - Municipal Council: Members: Francis Erick D. Delambaca; Amira Alia M. Caindec; Alfonso C. Alcala; Analyn H. Casane; Albert G. Bompat; Zinon G. Labaya; Felix M. Fudolig; Eduard G. Mejos; NB COMELEC
  - Electorate: 29,494 voters (2025)

Area
  - Total: 47.79 km^{2} (18.45 sq mi)
- Elevation: 10 m (33 ft)
- Highest elevation: 187 m (614 ft)
- Lowest elevation: 0 m (0 ft)

Population (2024 census)
  - Total: 41,760
  - Density: 873.8/km^{2} (2,263/sq mi)
  - Households: 8,694

Economy
  - Income class: 1st municipal income class
  - Poverty incidence: 19.89% (2023)
  - Revenue: ₱ 319.8 million (2024)
  - Assets: ₱ 1,210 million (2024)
  - Expenditure: ₱ 200.1 million (2024)
  - Liabilities: ₱ 283.8 million (2024)

Service provider
  - Electricity: Bohol 1 Electric Cooperative (BOHECO 1)
- Time zone: UTC+8 (PST)
- ZIP code: 6340
- PSGC: 0701233000
- IDD : area code: +63 (0)38
- Native languages: Boholano dialect Cebuano; Tagalog
- Website: panglaolgu.gov.ph

Panglao, officially the Municipality of Panglao (Cebuano: Munisipalidad sa Panglao; Tagalog: Bayan ng Panglao), is a municipality in the province of Bohol, Philippines. According to the 2024 census, it has a population of 41,760 people.

Panglao has educational institutions, including the San Agustin Academy (Panglao), Lourdes National High School, the Cristal e-College and elementary schools located in every barangay (including the Panglao Central Elementary School). It is also home to Bohol–Panglao International Airport that serves as Bohol's primary airport, replacing Tagbilaran Airport in November 2018.

The town of Panglao, Bohol celebrates its fiesta on August 27–28, to honor the town patron San Agustin.

== Etymology ==
The name Panglao may have come from its former name Panglawod, meaning "to the open sea", or derived from the word panggaw, referring to a fishing implement used by locals. The island also could be named after mapanglao by the Spanish, means "lonesome place".

== History ==
=== Precolonial era ===
Panglao flourished during the rule of the Kedatuan of Bo-ol, but raids by Moluccans and conquest by Ternate Sultanate resulted in periods of depopulation when its population fled mostly to Panay and Mindanao, including Dapitan at Mindanao.

Well before the Spanish colonization, the area was already long visited by Chinese and other Asian traders, as evinced by archaeological finds of Tang, Song, and Ming dynasty porcelain and trade wares.

=== Spanish colonial era ===
St. Augustine Church

During the Spanish rule, a Jesuit mission post was established, that in 1782 was formed into a parish, known as La Iglesia de San Agustin de Panglawod. In 1803, the town was officially made into a municipality.

The Panglao watchtower was built in 1851. The 5-storey octagonal tower is the tallest of its kind in the Philippines but suffers from neglect.

== Geography ==
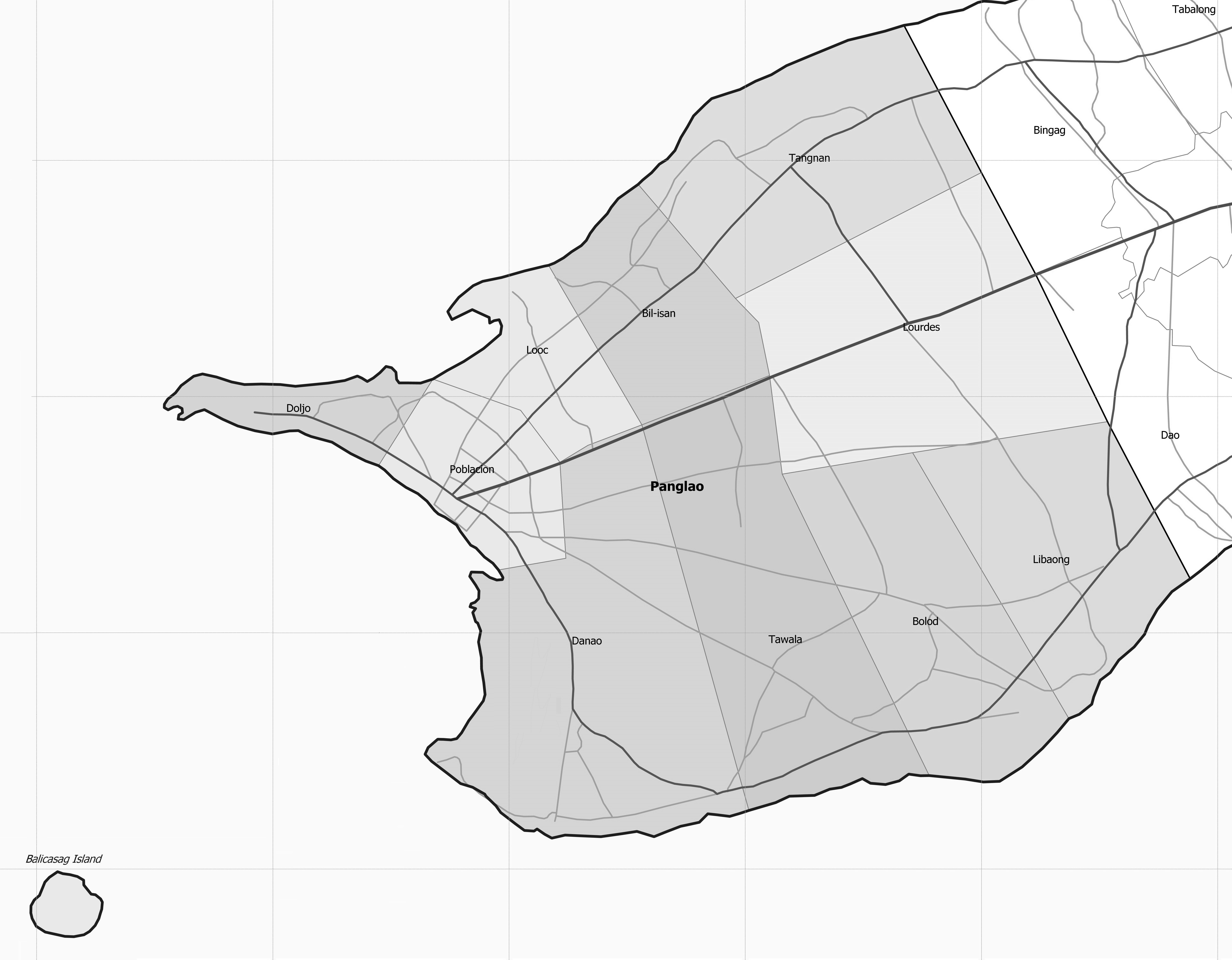
Map of Panglao showing barangays and islands

The municipality occupies the southwestern part of the eponymous Panglao Island, and its territory also includes the three smaller islands of Balicasag, Gak‑ang, and Pontod (or Pungtud, also known as Virgin Island). It is 20 kilometres (12 mi) from Tagbilaran.

There are no fresh water streams or lakes on the island, so for its drinking water, the municipality is dependent on wells and the Canhilbas Underground Spring.

It is one of two municipalities that make up Panglao Island (the other being Dauis). Panglao is known for its diving locations and tourist resorts.

=== Climate ===
Climate data for Panglao, Bohol
		Jan	Feb	Mar	Apr	May	Jun	Jul	Aug	Sep	Oct	Nov	Dec	Year
Average high	°C °F	30.3; 86.5	30.5; 86.9	31.4; 88.5	32.6; 90.7	33.1; 91.6	32.5; 90.5	32.1; 89.8	32.3; 90.1	32.1; 89.8	31.9; 89.4	31.6; 88.9	31.0; 87.8	31.8; 89.2
Average mean	°C °F	26.3; 79.3	26.3; 79.3	26.9; 80.4	27.9; 82.2	28.5; 83.3	28.1; 82.6	27.8; 82.0	27.9; 82.2	27.7; 81.9	27.6; 81.7	27.3; 81.1	26.9; 80.4	27.5; 81.5
Average low	°C °F	22.3; 72.1	22.2; 72.0	22.5; 72.5	23.3; 73.9	23.9; 75.0	23.7; 74.7	23.5; 74.3	23.6; 74.5	23.4; 74.1	23.3; 73.9	23.1; 73.6	22.9; 73.2	23.1; 73.6
Average rainfall	mm in	119; 4.7	90; 3.5	88; 3.5	70; 2.8	96; 3.8	147; 5.8	137; 5.4	116; 4.6	130; 5.1	190; 7.5	217; 8.5	144; 5.7	1,544; 61
Climate-data.org July 2016				Köppen-Geiger climate classification Af								Coronas type III		

=== Barangays ===
Panglao is politically subdivided into 10 barangays. Each barangay consists of puroks and some have sitios.

PSGC	Barangay	Population			±% p.a.		Area		PD 2024	
		2024		2010			ha	acre	/km^{2}	/sq mi
071233001	Bil‑isan	8.7%	3,649	3,050	▴	1.24%	364	899	1,000	2,600
071233002	Bolod	4.6%	1,906	1,690	▴	0.83%	598	1,478	320	830
071233003	Danao	11.8%	4,935	3,860	▴	1.71%	790	1,952	620	1,600
071233004	Doljo	8.2%	3,417	3,004	▴	0.89%	110	272	3,100	8,000
071233005	Libaong	5.1%	2,132	1,842	▴	1.01%	423	1,045	500	1,300
071233006	Looc	6.1%	2,543	2,282	▴	0.75%	254	628	1,000	2,600
071233007	Lourdes	3.7%	1,544	1,387	▴	0.74%	377	932	410	1,100
071233008	Poblacion	12.7%	5,305	4,831	▴	0.65%	683	1,688	780	2,000
071233009	Tangnan	8.7%	3,645	3,324	▴	0.64%	629	1,554	580	1,500
071233010	Tawala	10.7%	4,477	3,333	▴	2.05%	892	2,204	500	1,300
	Total		41,760	28,603	▴	2.64%	4,779	11,809	870	14

== Demographics ==
Population census of Panglao
Year	Pop.	±% p.a.
1903	7,050	—
1918	9,065	+1.69%
1939	9,411	+0.18%
1948	11,274	+2.03%
1960	11,836	+0.41%
1970	13,309	+1.18%
1975	13,624	+0.47%
1980	14,547	+1.32%
1990	17,004	+1.57%
1995	18,095	+1.17%
2000	21,337	+3.60%
2007	25,558	+2.52%
2010	28,603	+4.18%
2015	33,553	+3.09%
2020	39,839	+3.68%
2024	41,760	+1.14%
Source: Philippine Statistics Authority

== Economy ==
Poverty incidence of Panglao (%)

Source: Philippine Statistics Authority

== Tourism ==
The primary tourist attraction of Panglao are its white sandy beaches, of which Alona Beach is the most famous and most developed. Alona Beach is about 1,500 metres (1,640 yd) long, lined with palm trees. resorts, and shops. However it has drawn criticism for its unrestrained development that ignored municipal development policies, warning against overcrowding and Alona to lose its paradise-like image. Other beaches in Panglao include Bagobo, Bolod, Danao, Doljo, and Momo.

Bohol–Panglao International Airport, also known as New Bohol International Airport, has been operational since November 28, 2018. It replaced Tagbilaran Airport as the main airport in Bohol.

Panglao is renowned for snorkeling and dive sites such as Doljo Beach, Garden Eels, Arco Point, Kalipayan, Napaling, and Puntod. The island's southern portion is ringed with reefs that are relatively narrow and shallow (5 to 6 metres (16 to 20 ft)) with submarine cliffs plunging to depths of 33 to 56 metres (108 to 184 ft). Tours can readily be arranged to further dive sites, including Balicasag and Pamilacan, Bohol islands.

== Gallery ==
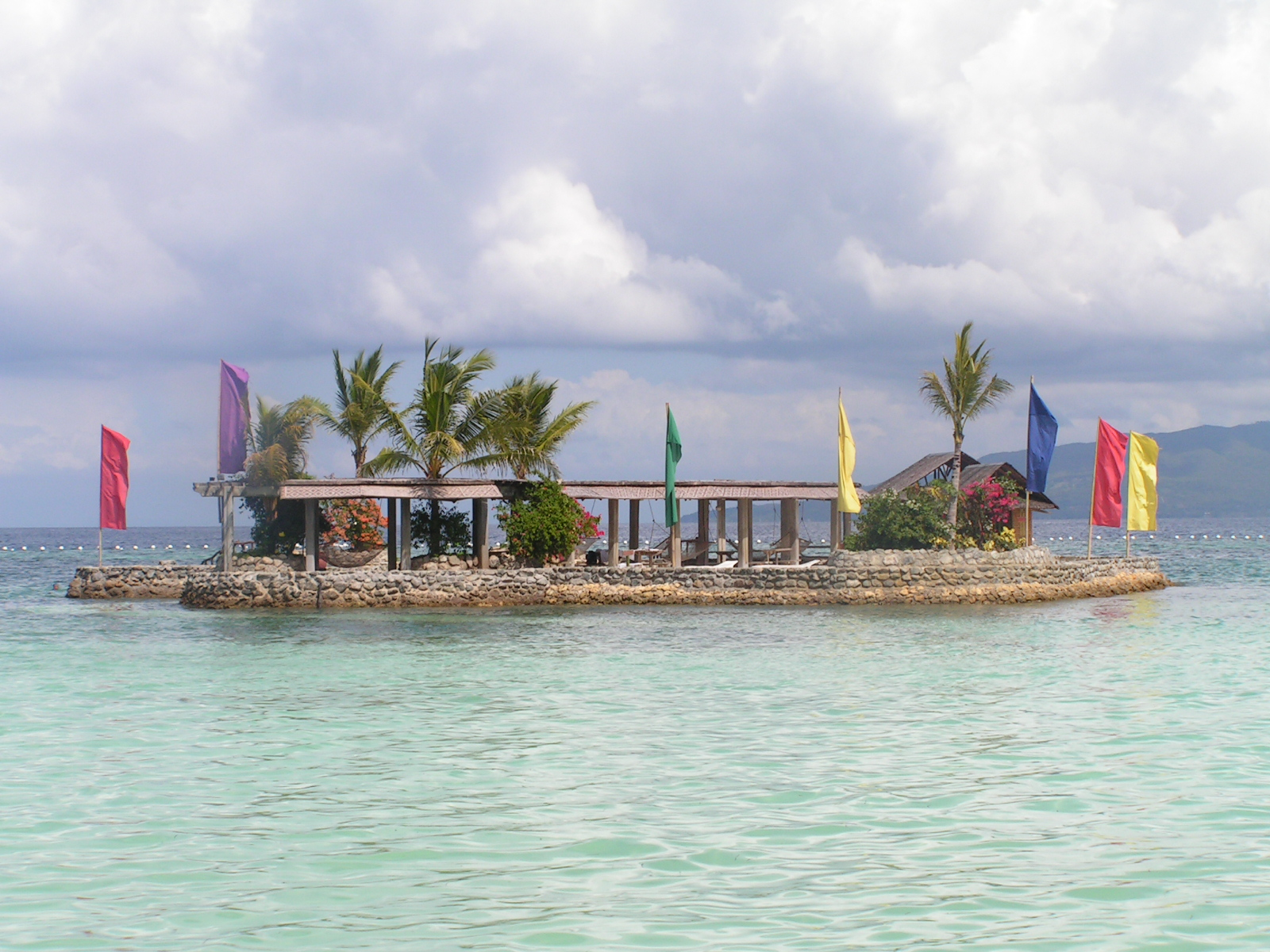
Panglao Island Nature Resort

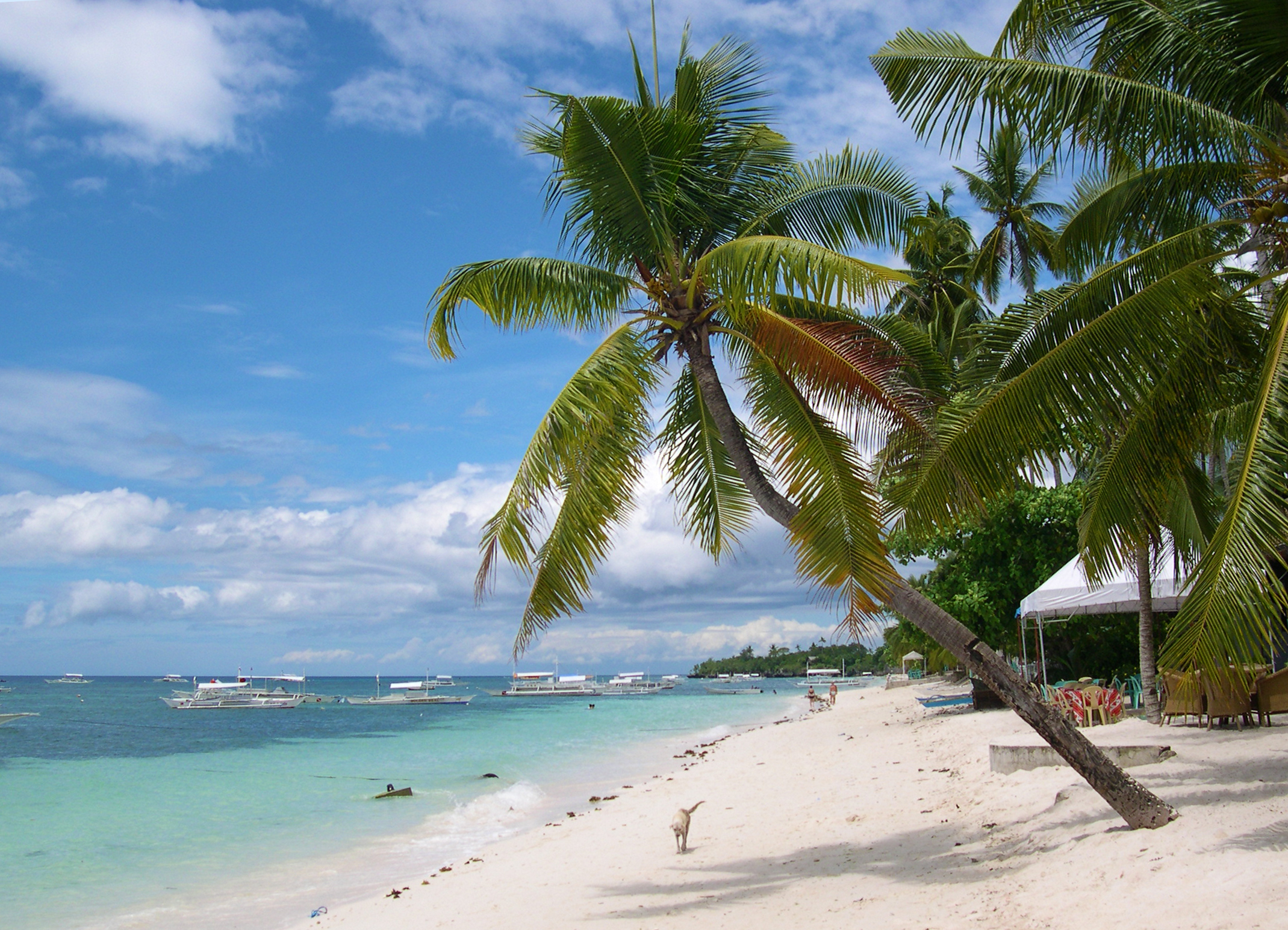
Alona Beach

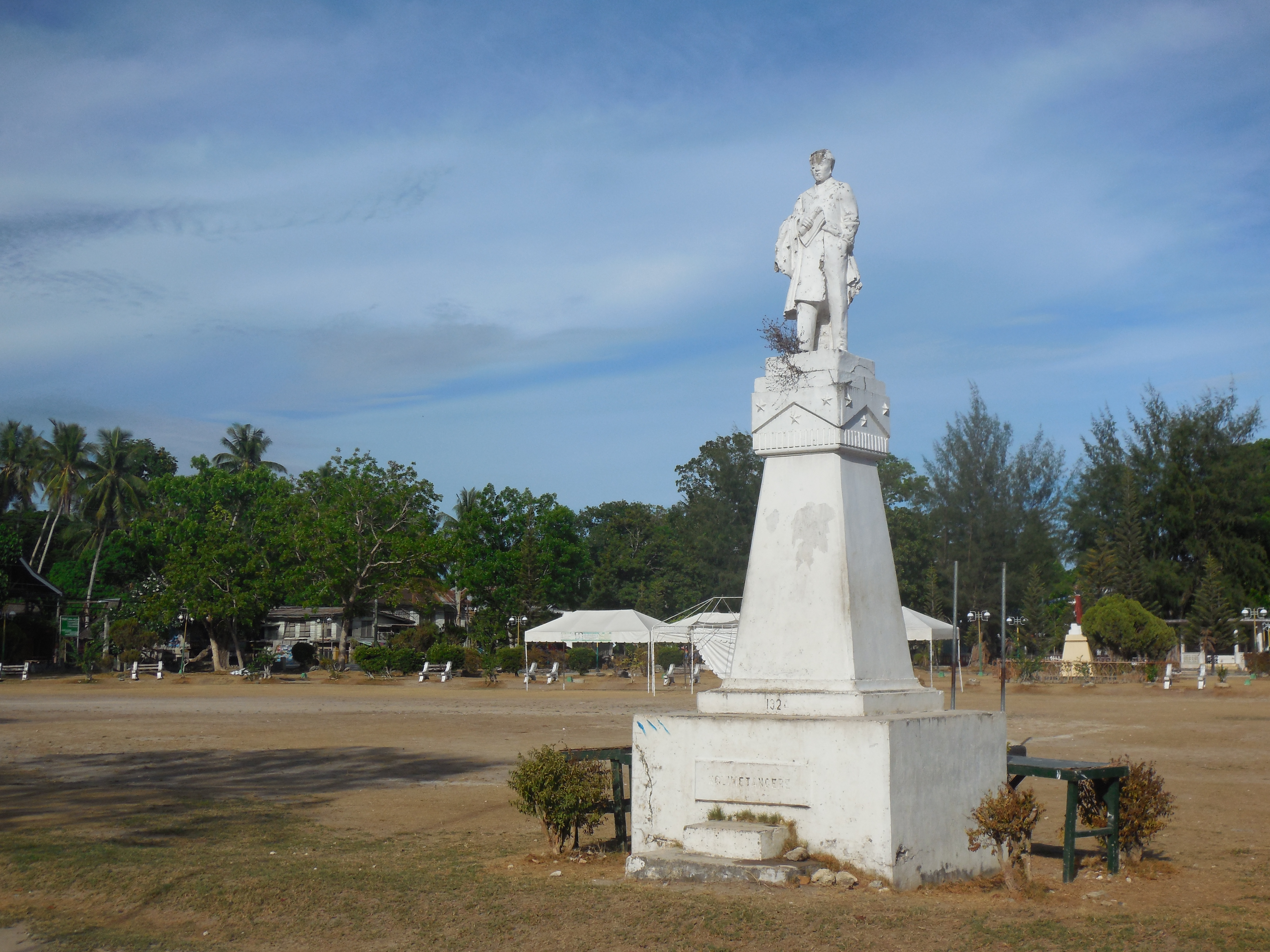
Rizal Monument at Panglao Plaza

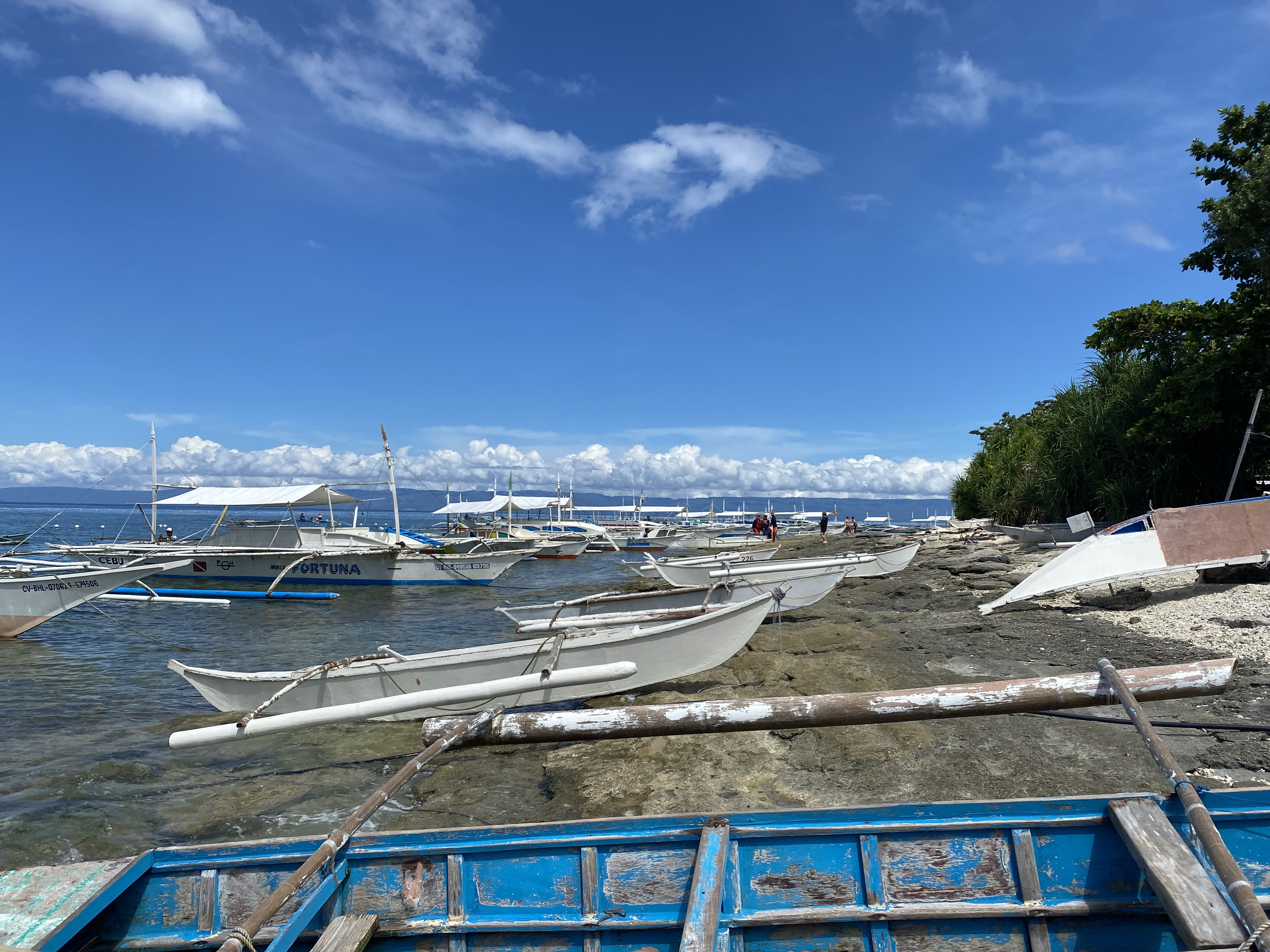
Boats docked on Balicasag Island

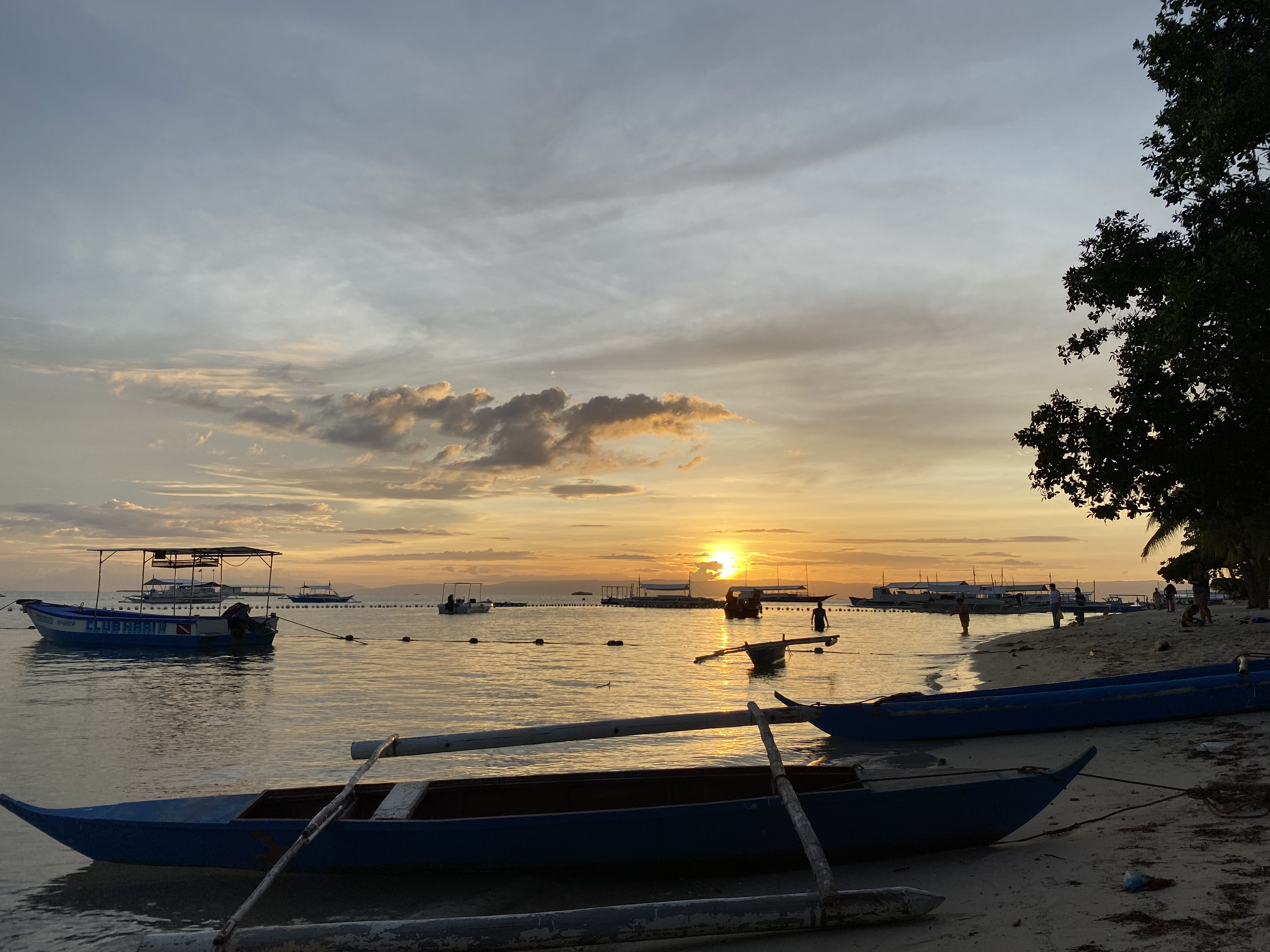
Sunset on a Panglao beach

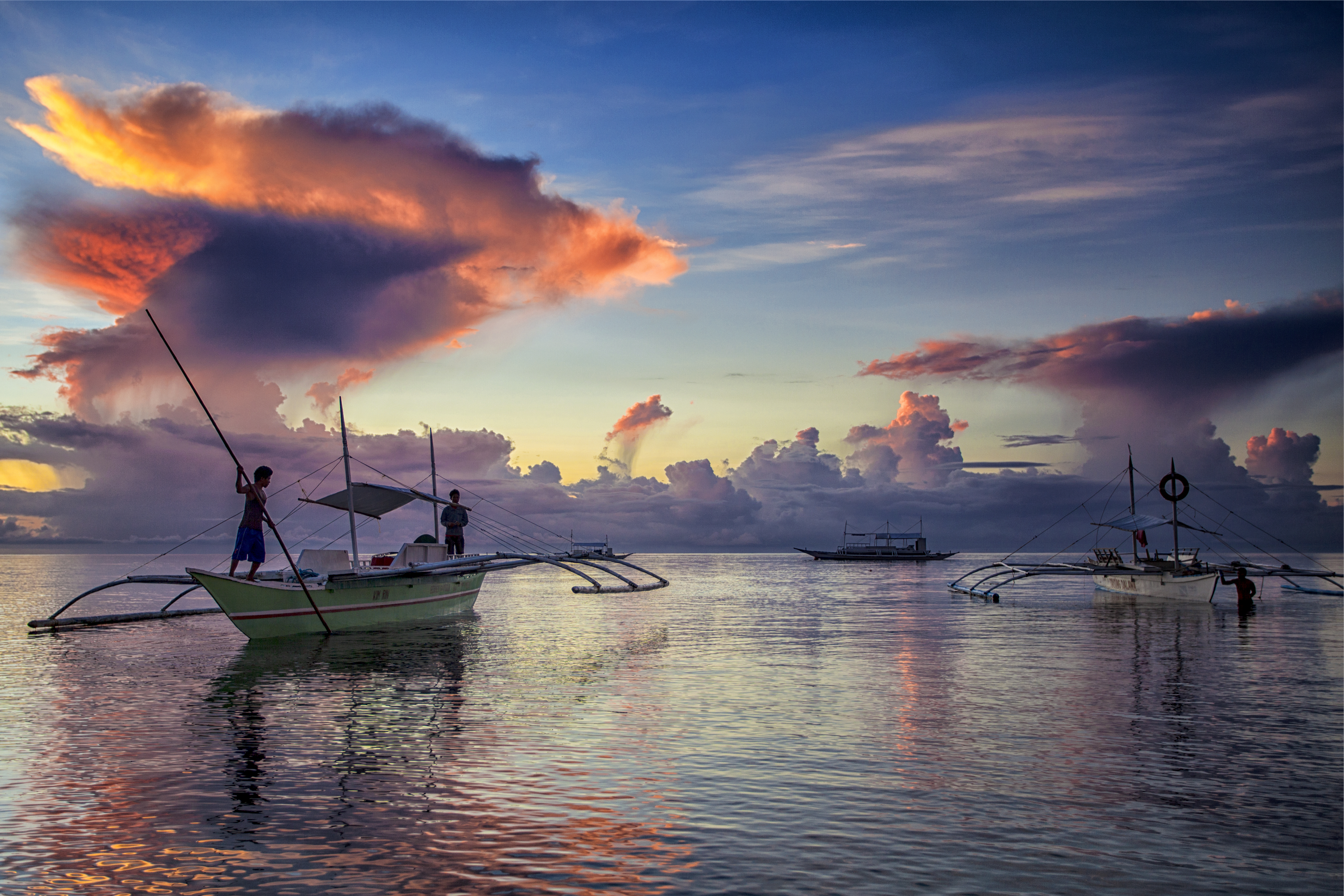
Fishermen of Panglao at early morning

== Notable personalities ==
- Rebecca Lusterio – Actress, born in Balicasag island
