= Dauis Church =

- Assumption of Our Lady Shrine-Parish Church
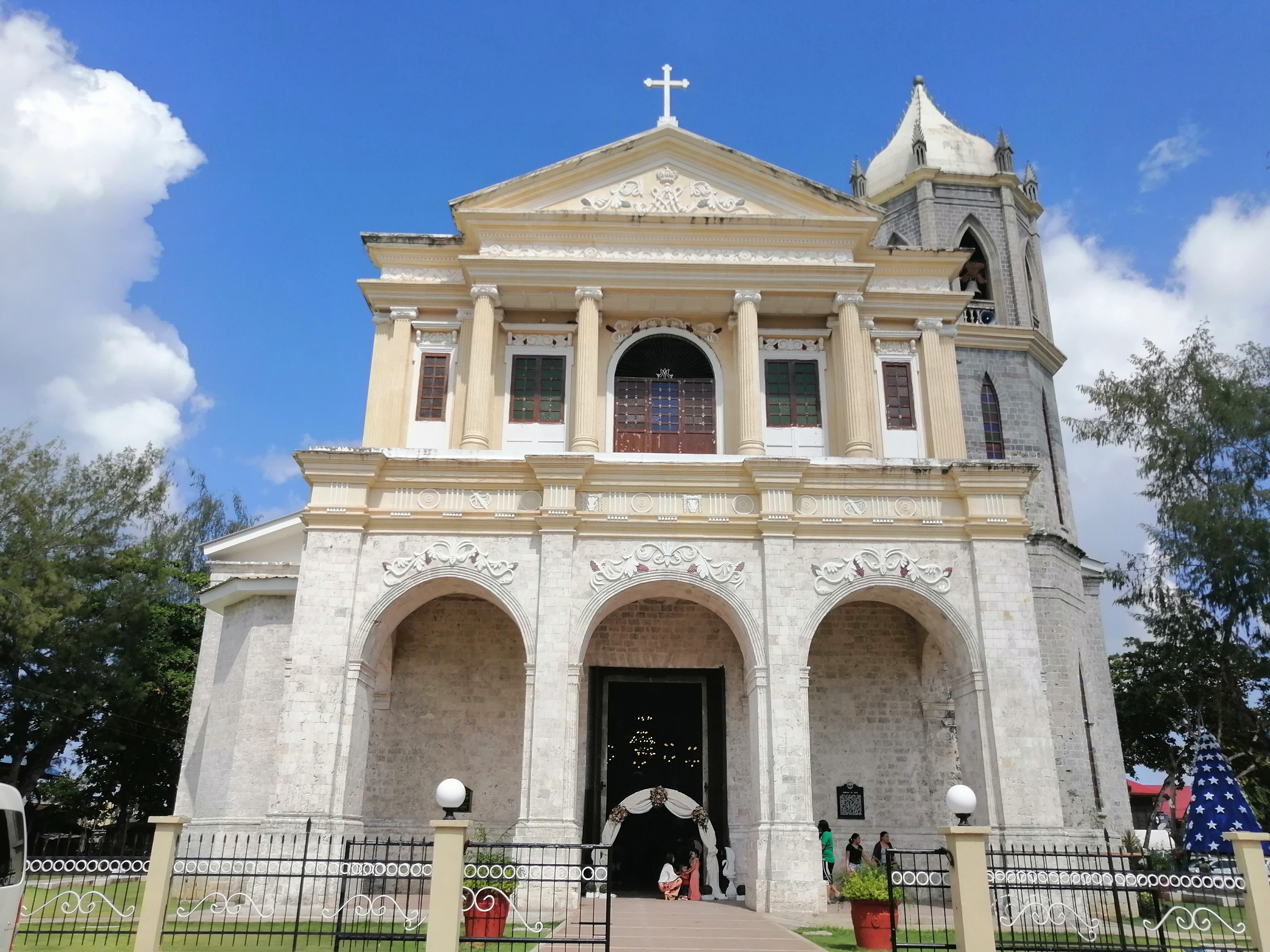
- Church façade in 2019, post-restoration

- Republic of the Philippines Dauis Church (Philippines)
- 9°37′33″N 123°51′54″E
- Location: Dauis, Bohol
- Country: Philippines
- Denomination: Roman Catholic

History
- Status: Diocesan Shrine
- Founded: 1697
- Founders: Fr. Diego de Ayala, SJ; Fr. Joseph Gregorio, SJ
- Dedication: Our Lady of the Assumption
- Consecrated: August 23, 1923

Architecture
- Functional status: Active
- Heritage designation: National Historical Landmark; National Cultural Treasure
- Designated: 2009, 2011
- Architectural type: Church building
- Style: Neo-Gothic, Neo-classic
- Years built: 1697; 1769 (dst. 1795); 1863–1879, 1919–1923 (dst. 2013); 2015–2017
- Groundbreaking: 2015
- Completed: August 15, 2017

Specifications
- Materials: Coral stones

Administration
- Province: Cebu
- Diocese: Tagbilaran
- Deanery: Assumption of Our Lady
- Parish: Assumption of Our Lady

Clergy
- Dean: Ruel Ramon
- Priest: Jose Sinforiano Monton

National Historical Landmarks
- Official name: Dauis Church Complex
- Designated: February 27, 2009
- Region: Central Visayas
- Legal Basis: Resolution No. 3, s. 2009
- Marker Date: May 16, 2009

National Cultural Treasures
- Official name: Shrine-Parish of the Assumption of the Blessed Virgin Mary Complex
- Designated: August 29, 2011
- Region: Central Visayas

Dauis Church, officially known as the Assumption of Our Lady Shrine-Parish Church, is a Roman Catholic church in the municipality of Dauis, Bohol, Philippines, within the jurisdiction of the Diocese of Tagbilaran. Founded by Jesuit priests in 1697, it is one of the oldest churches in the province. After being damaged by the 2013 Bohol earthquake, it was restored and reconstructed from 2015 to 2017.

The church houses an image of Our Lady of the Assumption, which was canonically crowned in 2023. The church is also famous for its miraculous underground water well. It has been declared a National Cultural Treasure by the National Museum of the Philippines and a National Historical Landmark by the National Historical Commission of the Philippines.

== History ==
Dauis Church was founded by Jesuit priests in 1697. The church was made of light materials based on Jesuit records. In 1753, Fr. Joseph Nepomuceno, S.J. built a convent in the church complex which became the Jesuits' residence after transferring from Loboc. By 1768, the Jesuits were expelled from the Philippines and the Augustinian Recollects took over.

In 1769, the Recollects built another church structure made of bamboo and wood; this was destroyed by a fire in 1795.

Construction of the fifth and current structure, made of stone, was initiated by Fr. Julio Saldana, a Recollect priest, in 1863. During this stage, the Recollects ended the administration of the parish church during the Philippine Revolution. The church was consecrated on August 23, 1923.

On August 15, 2004, the church was declared as a diocesan shrine of its patroness, Nuestra Señora de la Asuncion.

=== Heritage and cultural designations ===
In 2009, the National Historical Commission of the Philippines (NHCP) passed a resolution declaring Dauis Church as a National Historical Landmark; a marker was installed on May 16. On August 29, 2011, the National Museum of the Philippines designated the church a National Cultural Treasure; a new marker was unveiled on August 14, 2023.

=== 2013 earthquake and restoration ===
Animation of the church before and after the 2013 earthquake.

On October 15, 2013, a strong earthquake heavily damaged the church and several other churches designated as National Cultural Treasures.

Dauis Church was one of the first of twenty-five heritage churches in Bohol to be restored. The National Historical Commission of the Philippines (NHCP) facilitated the rehabilitation of the church. Restoration works began in 2015, and was reopened on August 15, 2017, the Solemnity of the Assumption of the Blessed Virgin Mary, as well as the church and town's feast day.

== Architecture ==
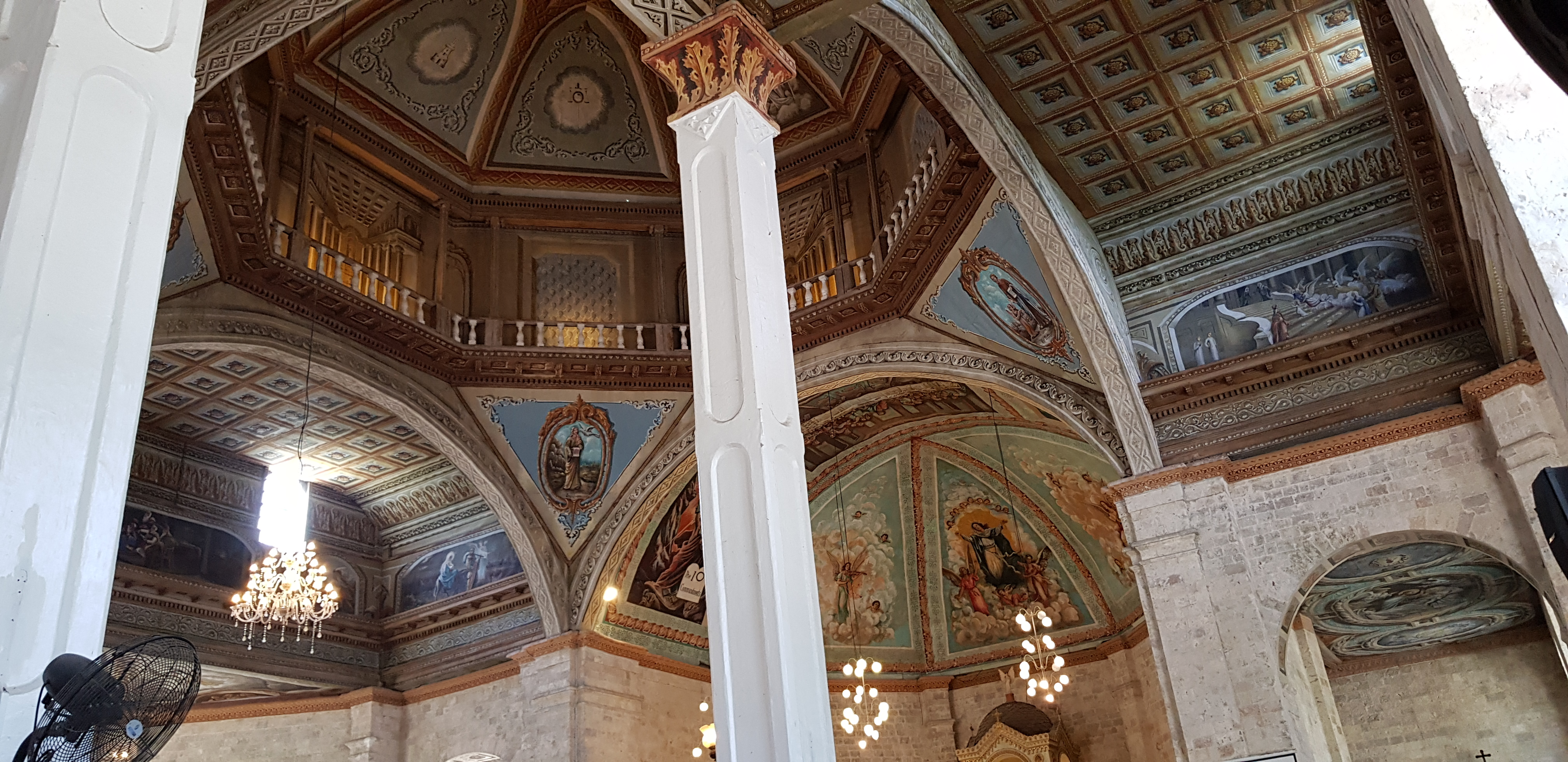
Columns and ceiling design of the church

Dauis Church sports a mix of neo-Gothic and neo-classical architecture. Its two-level neoclassical facade features a three-arch portico leading to the entrance of the church. The octagonal bell tower, first erected by the Recollects in 1774 as a then-lookout tower, is designed in the neo-Gothic style.

The central altar of Dauis Church resembles a temple-like design, in contrast to the wall-like retablo (reredos) of other old churches. Murals adorn the ceiling of the church, while its crossing is flanked by a cupola shaped in a low octagonal pyramid.

== Venerated Marian image ==
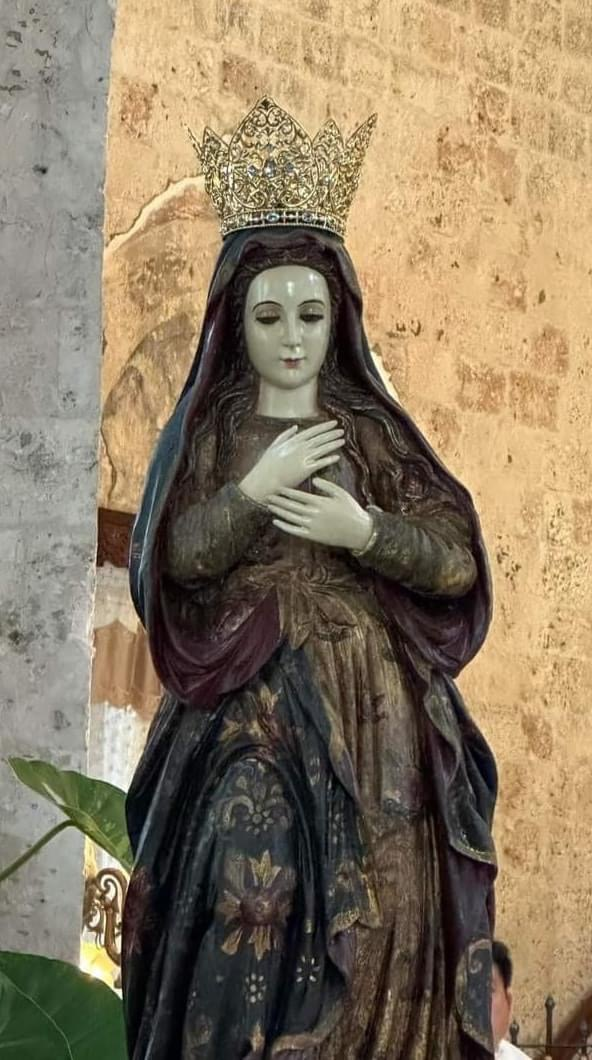
The canonically crowned image of Our Lady of the Assumption of Dauis.

The shrine houses the image of Nuestra Señora de la Asuncion, the titular of the church and the patroness of Dauis.

In July 2021, Bishop Alberto Uy petitioned the Holy See for the canonical coronation of the Marian image. On March 28, 2022, Pope Francis granted the coronation of the image; the coronation took place on August 15, 2023, making it the first canonically crowned image in the Diocese of Tagbilaran and the province of Bohol.

== See also ==
- List of Roman Catholic churches in Bohol

== Bibliography ==
- Jose, Regalado Trota (2001). Visita Iglesia Bohol (A Guide to Historic Churches). Manila: National Commission for Culture and the Arts. ISBN 9718140166.
