= Alona Beach =

Tourist beach in the province of Bohol, Philippines

Coordinates: 9°32′55″N 123°46′15″E

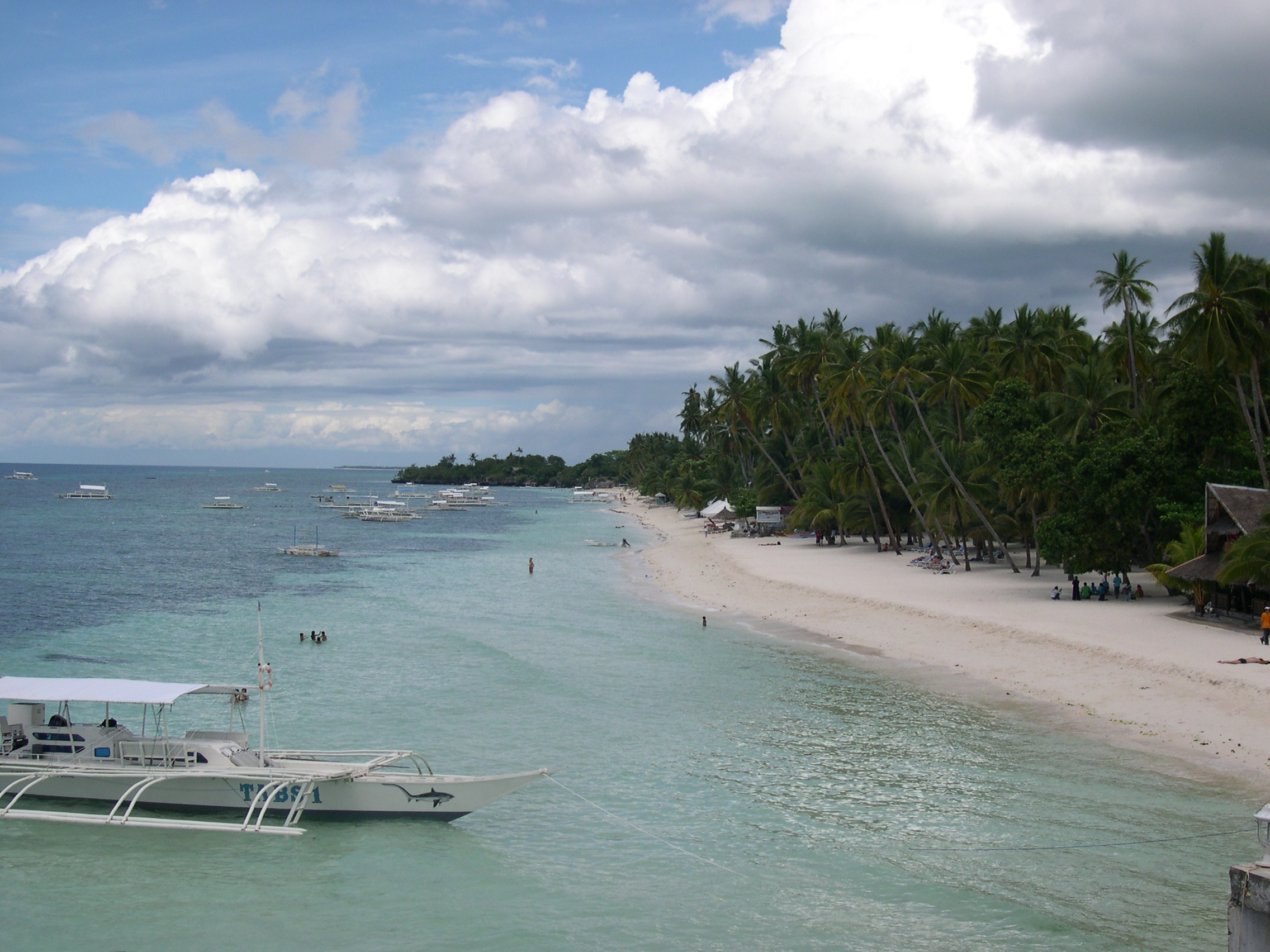
Alona Beach

The Alona beach is a popular public beach located at the south-west tip of Panglao Island, Bohol in the Philippines. The beach is situated less than two miles from the Bohol-Panglao International Airport It is known for its white sand, rocky cliffs, and commercial facilities that line the 1 kilometre (0.62 mi) stretch of beach. The beach is located near a coral reef and is a popular scuba-diving and snorkeling spot.

The beach is named after Filipino actress Alona Alegre who ran naked along the beach in 1973 for the movie “Esteban”, in which she co-starred along with Fernando Poe Jr.

== Geography ==
The beach is located at barangay Tawala in Panglao, one of the two municipalities in Panglao Island, Philippines. It is situated around 20 kilometres (12 mi) from the port of Tagbilaran and about 2 kilometres (1.2 mi) from the Bohol-Panglao International Airport. It is accessible by a sealed road, by car, motorbike, airport bus or jeepney. Alona Beach is rather small as it spans less than one kilometre (half-mile) of white powder sand surrounded by low rocky cliffs.

== Economics ==
The dominant economic activity is tourism. The beach is usually busy with an estimated one million visitors per day during peak season, according to a 2014 survey. There are a number of restaurants, bars, and resorts located on the left side and the right side of the beach. Many resorts offer a wide range of accommodation options with scuba and snorkeling as the most popular activities. Following the 2018 Boracay closure and redevelopment, Environment Secretary Roy Cimatu ordered the demolition of structures situated along the 20 metres (66 ft) easement zone of Panglao beaches including Alona beach. Among those demolished were a two-story building and sea walls. Businesses along the beach were severely affected during the COVID-19 pandemic.

The beach is connected to the Anos Fonacier Circumferential Road. An airport bus directly connects the beach to the airport and to Tagbilaran.

== Marine ecosystem ==
The underwater ecosystem is protected and the access to the marine reserve is limited every day. From time to time, boat trips are organized as far as Oslob to see whale sharks. Some can be spotted sporadically in the vicinity of the beach. The underwater fauna and the flora are rich; there are many healthy corals (inc. black coral), schools of fish (e.g. sardines), turtles, barracudas, lobsters and if lucky one may even spot whale sharks or dolphins. The underwater current can be quite strong from time to time, creating a lot of turbidity in the water.

=== Scuba diving ===
Alona Beach is a reputed destination for snorkeling and more importantly scuba diving. The nearby Balicasag and Pamilacan islands are of particular interest since both are marine reserves. There is a large number of dive shops in Alona Beach offering a variety of diving certification courses, technical courses and excursions for divers of all levels. Drift diving is a popular activity.

=== Fishing ===
Some sport fishing is organised on the beach but the main center for this activity is the seaport of Panglao town. Urchins are picked by locals and sold as a delicacy snack on the beach.
