= Cristal e-College =

University in Bohol, Philippines

Coordinates: 9.588°N 123.772°E

- The Cristal e-College seal
- Other names: Cristal E, Ce-C, CeC
- Former name: Cristal Computer Institute Inc. (2003–2004)
- Motto: Latin: Eruditio, Gubernatio, et Humanitas
- Motto in English: Knowledge, Leadership, and Humanity.
- Type: Private research, basic and higher education institution
- Established: November 2003; 23 years ago
- Founder: Victoriano Tirol Jr.
- President: Will Tyron Tirol
- Location: Dauis–Panglao Rd, Tawala, Panglao, Bohol, 6340, Philippines
- Campus: Suburban
- Medium of instruction: English, Filipino, Cebuano
- Colors: Blue and Gold
- Website: www.cec.edu.ph

Cristal e-College (abbreviated as Ce-C or CeC) is a private research higher education in Panglao, Bohol, Philippines. It was established on March 1, 2002 by Victoriano Tirol Jr. as a franchisee of Informatics Computer Institute. It offers programs in secondary and tertiary levels.

== History ==
Cristal e-College, initially called Cristal Computer Institute Incorporation, was granted collegiate status on November 10, 2003, initially offering technology-based programs such as computer science and information technology. Classes were held at the Cristal Towers in Tagbilaran City.

In September 2004, a new permanent campus was laid at Tawala, Panglao. Construction for the campus didn't begin until January 2005, and opened on June 20, 2005. The first year saw an enrollment of 173 students, increasing to 315 students the following year after the addition of new programs.

Around 2008, the college launched programs in maritime transport and engineering. This launch increased the college's student population to 1045 students. The college's early graduates successfully recruited by major international shipping agencies, such as Wilhelmsen-Smith Bell Shipping, Globemasters, and K Line.

In May 2009, a 144-capacity student dormitory was constructed on the campus. Additionally, the college secured full scholarship grants for deck and engine cadets from Bouvet Shipping Management Corporation.

In early 2012, the college received official approval from Ministry of Land, Infrastructure, Transport and Tourism under a new certification program for seafarers. The first batch of specialized class cadets under K Line graduated in April 2012.

In February 2023, student Abram Noja Arellano, placed 1st place in the Certified Mechanics licensure Examination, garnering a 90.35% rating. In September 2025 at the TOMSP awards, student Gabriel Bernalte, placed in the top 10 most outstanding maritime students of the Philippines. In February 2026, student Renalao N. Cabajog, named 10th place in the Licensure Examination for Professional Teachers Secondary Level in the Boholano topnotchers, earning 50,000 PHP.
