= Dauis =

Municipality in Bohol, Philippines

Dauis Mariveles
- Municipality
- Municipality of Dauis
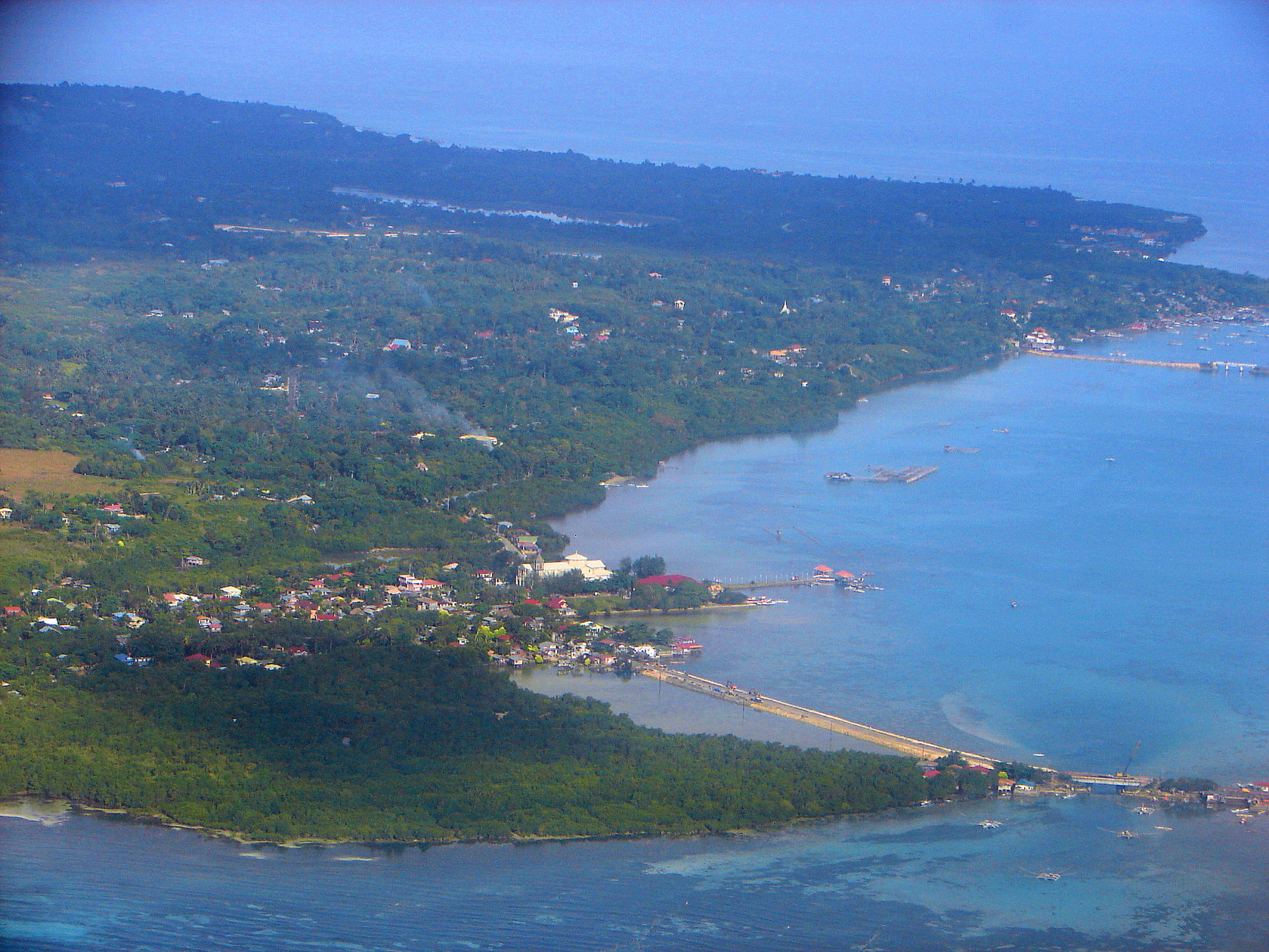
- Aerial view of Dauis, Panglao Island

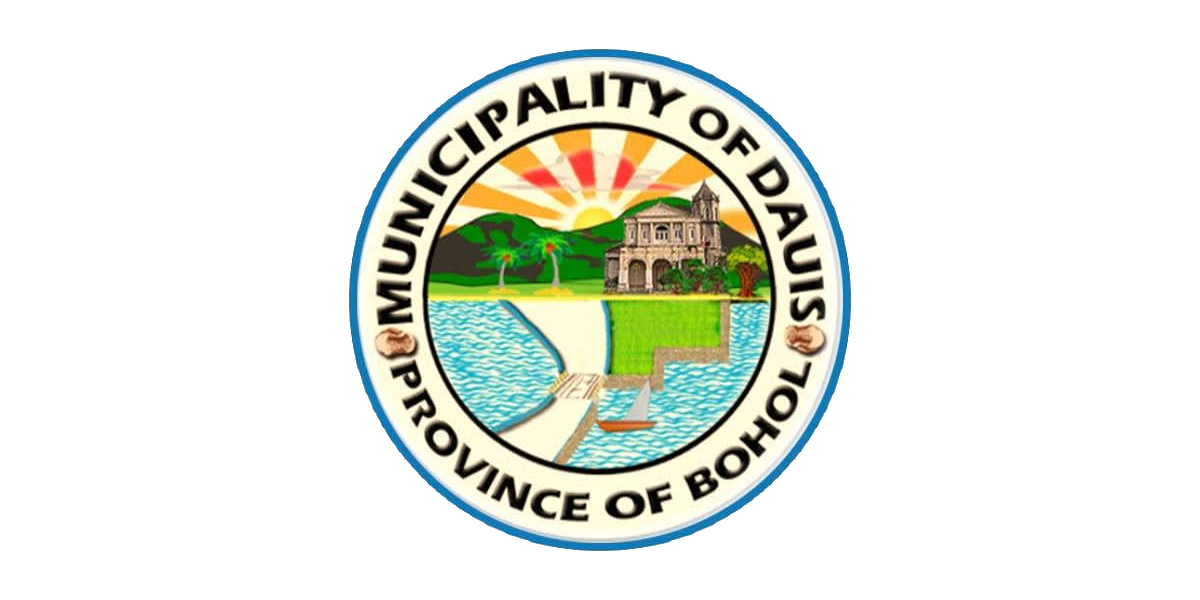
- Flag

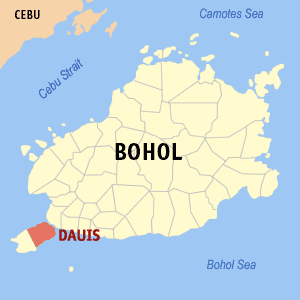
- Map of Bohol with Dauis highlighted
- Interactive map of Dauis
- Location within the Philippines
- Coordinates: 9°37′30″N 123°51′54″E
- Country: Philippines
- Region: Central Visayas
- Province: Bohol
- District: 1st district
- Founded: 1697
- Barangays: 12 (see Barangays)

Government
  - Type: Sangguniang Bayan
  - Mayor: Marietta T. Sumaylo
  - Vice Mayor: Marie Nickie H. Bolos
  - Representative: John Geesnell Yap
  - Municipal Council: Members: Rogelio G. Opada; Rhea Marie T. Pon; Ma. Dina C. Colarines; Randy B. Pingkian; Corazon D. Aranas; Rolly B. Guillena; Ramon M. Rulona; Jobert C. Bomediano; NB COMELEC
  - Electorate: 32,679 voters (2025)

Area
  - Total: 43.33 km^{2} (16.73 sq mi)
- Elevation: 34 m (112 ft)
- Highest elevation: 192 m (630 ft)
- Lowest elevation: 0 m (0 ft)

Population (2024 census)
  - Total: 53,864
  - Density: 1,243/km^{2} (3,220/sq mi)
  - Households: 11,522

Economy
  - Income class: 1st municipal income class
  - Poverty incidence: 16.96% (2023)
  - Revenue: ₱ 229.3 million (2024)
  - Assets: ₱ 604.2 million (2024)
  - Expenditure: ₱ 55 million (2024)
  - Liabilities: ₱ 68.44 million (2024)
- Time zone: UTC+8 (PST)
- ZIP code: 6339
- PSGC: 0701219000
- IDD : area code: +63 (0)38
- Native languages: Boholano dialect Cebuano; Tagalog
- Website: dauis.bohol.gov.ph

Dauis, officially the Municipality of Dauis (Cebuano: Munisipalidad sa Dauis; Tagalog: Bayan ng Dauis), is a municipality in the province of Bohol, Philippines. According to the 2024 census, it has a population of 53,864 people. The town has many fine beaches, resorts, and a historic church, built in the 17th century. The Hinagdanan Cave is also a draw for tourists.

== History ==
=== Spanish colonial era ===
Dauis is among Bohol's oldest municipalities, as evidenced by Chinese artifacts discovered in the 1970s. Dauis was a part of the Panglao and Bohol Centered Kedatuan of Bo-ol. Although most town records were lost during World War II, church documents confirm the parish was formally established by 1697. The now-ruined stone watchtower was constructed in 1774.

The first bridge between the poblacion of Dauis and Mansasa, Tagbilaran, was constructed by Spaniards during their reign, possibly in the 18th century. The bridge is still in place, used as a connection between the two islands. The other bridge was constructed near the old City Hall of Tagbilaran City, crossing towards Totolan. That bridge is known as 'the causeway' and leads as far as Panglao Beach resort about 17 kilometres (11 mi) from Tagbilaran. The 1818 census showed that Dauis-Tagbilaran had 2,055 native families and 9 Spanish-Filipino families.

=== American colonial era ===
In 1900, a Spanish official supervised the construction of a deep well in the poblacion, now located beneath the altar of the local church. The excavation was carried out by local residents using manual tools such as bolos, crowbars, pulleys, and ropes. The well reaches a depth of approximately 30 fathoms (about 55 meters or 180 feet) and has a diameter of around three meters (9.8 feet). The site is characterized by soil and stone layers containing limestone rock.

On November 15, 1907, Eusebio Circulado was elected the municipal president, but he informed the municipal council that he is ineligible. As a result, a special election was scheduled for April 8, 1908.

In 1914 one author proposed extending a preexisting water pipeline from Tagbilaran to Dauis, since the town had no water supply of its own at the time.

== Geography ==
Dauis is located in the northern part of Panglao Island. It is 3 kilometres (1.9 mi) from Tagbilaran.

=== Barangays ===
Dauis is politically subdivided into 12 barangays. Each barangay consists of puroks and some have sitios.

PSGC	Barangay	Population			±% p.a.	
		2024		2010		
071219001	Biking	6.4%	3,428	3,334	▴	0.19%
071219002	Bingag	8.2%	4,436	3,877	▴	0.94%
071219004	Catarman	8.8%	4,749	4,373	▴	0.57%
071219005	Dao	2.8%	1,514	1,331	▴	0.90%
071219012	Mariveles	6.8%	3,664	3,216	▴	0.91%
071219006	Mayacabac	7.3%	3,934	3,469	▴	0.88%
071219007	Poblacion	5.7%	3,074	2,672	▴	0.98%
071219003	San Isidro (Canlongon)	2.5%	1,330	1,238	▴	0.50%
071219008	Songculan	8.1%	4,375	3,870	▴	0.86%
071219009	Tabalong	10.0%	5,375	4,410	▴	1.38%
071219010	Tinago	5.1%	2,753	2,169	▴	1.67%
071219011	Totolan	13.1%	7,031	5,479	▴	1.75%
	Total		53,864	39,448	▴	2.19%

=== Climate ===
Climate data for Dauis, Bohol
Month	Jan	Feb	Mar	Apr	May	Jun	Jul	Aug	Sep	Oct	Nov	Dec	Year
Mean daily maximum °C (°F)	28 (82)	29 (84)	30 (86)	31 (88)	31 (88)	30 (86)	30 (86)	30 (86)	30 (86)	29 (84)	29 (84)	29 (84)	30 (85)
Mean daily minimum °C (°F)	23 (73)	22 (72)	23 (73)	23 (73)	24 (75)	25 (77)	24 (75)	24 (75)	24 (75)	24 (75)	23 (73)	23 (73)	24 (74)
Average precipitation mm (inches)	102 (4.0)	85 (3.3)	91 (3.6)	75 (3.0)	110 (4.3)	141 (5.6)	121 (4.8)	107 (4.2)	111 (4.4)	144 (5.7)	169 (6.7)	139 (5.5)	1,395 (55.1)
Average rainy days	18.6	14.8	16.5	16.7	23.9	26.4	25.6	24.1	24.4	26.3	23.7	20.5	261.5
Source: Meteoblue (Use with caution: this is modeled/calculated data, not measured locally.)

== Demographics ==
Population census of Dauis

Year	Pop.	±% p.a.
1903	8,378	—
1918	10,275	+1.37%
1939	12,154	+0.80%
1948	12,303	+0.14%
1960	13,595	+0.84%
1970	15,812	+1.52%

Year	Pop.	±% p.a.
1975	17,955	+2.58%
1980	18,260	+0.34%
1990	23,601	+2.60%
1995	24,041	+0.35%
2000	26,415	+2.04%
2007	36,525	+4.57%

Year	Pop.	±% p.a.
2010	39,448	+2.84%
2015	45,663	+2.83%
2020	52,492	+2.98%
2024	53,864	+0.62%

Source: Philippine Statistics Authority

== Economy ==
Poverty incidence of Dauis (%)

Source: Philippine Statistics Authority

== Culture ==
The town's 18th-century church, is dedicated to La Señora de la Asuncion or Our Lady of the Assumption. The church is believed to have been built of light materials by the first Spanish missionaries in 1697. Since then, the church has gone through several changes.

The image of the La Señora de la Asuncion is famed to be miraculous. Faithfuls come from near and far to hike the distance from the city to the site to invoke special petitions or mainly to honor the Patroness. In addition, at the foot of the altar of the church is a well also believed to have healing power. The water tastes fresh, despite the well's proximity to the seashore.

15 August

The town and all devotees of the La Señora de la Asuncion attend the Patroness' feast day every 15 August. Stories abound of the Patroness' sojourn and blessings. One of the stories tells of a man who found a camiseta (blouse) in his fishing boat after a lady passenger disembarked. On several occasions, devotees found the Patroness' camiseta full of amorseco. Many believe the Patroness must, on occasions, get down from her pedestal to visit them in their homes and farms. To this day, devotees continue to venerate and pay homage as manifestation of gratitude and appreciation after being healed of their ailments through the camiseta.

Last Sunday of January

Another fiesta is celebrated last Sunday of January, to commemorate a miracle that happened many years back. It is said that many young girls have seen the lady waving her hands as if bidding them to come near.

== Tourism ==
Dauis's major tourist attractions are Our Lady of Assumption Church and Hinagdanan Cave. Our Lady of Assumption Church is locally known as Señora de la Asunción. The church was built by Boholanos under forced labor imposed by the Spanish. It is constructed of solid rocks or stones and has paintings on the walls. There is a tower with a bell, outside the church another tower and also a small well. The front face of the church collapsed during the earthquake of 2013.

== Gallery ==
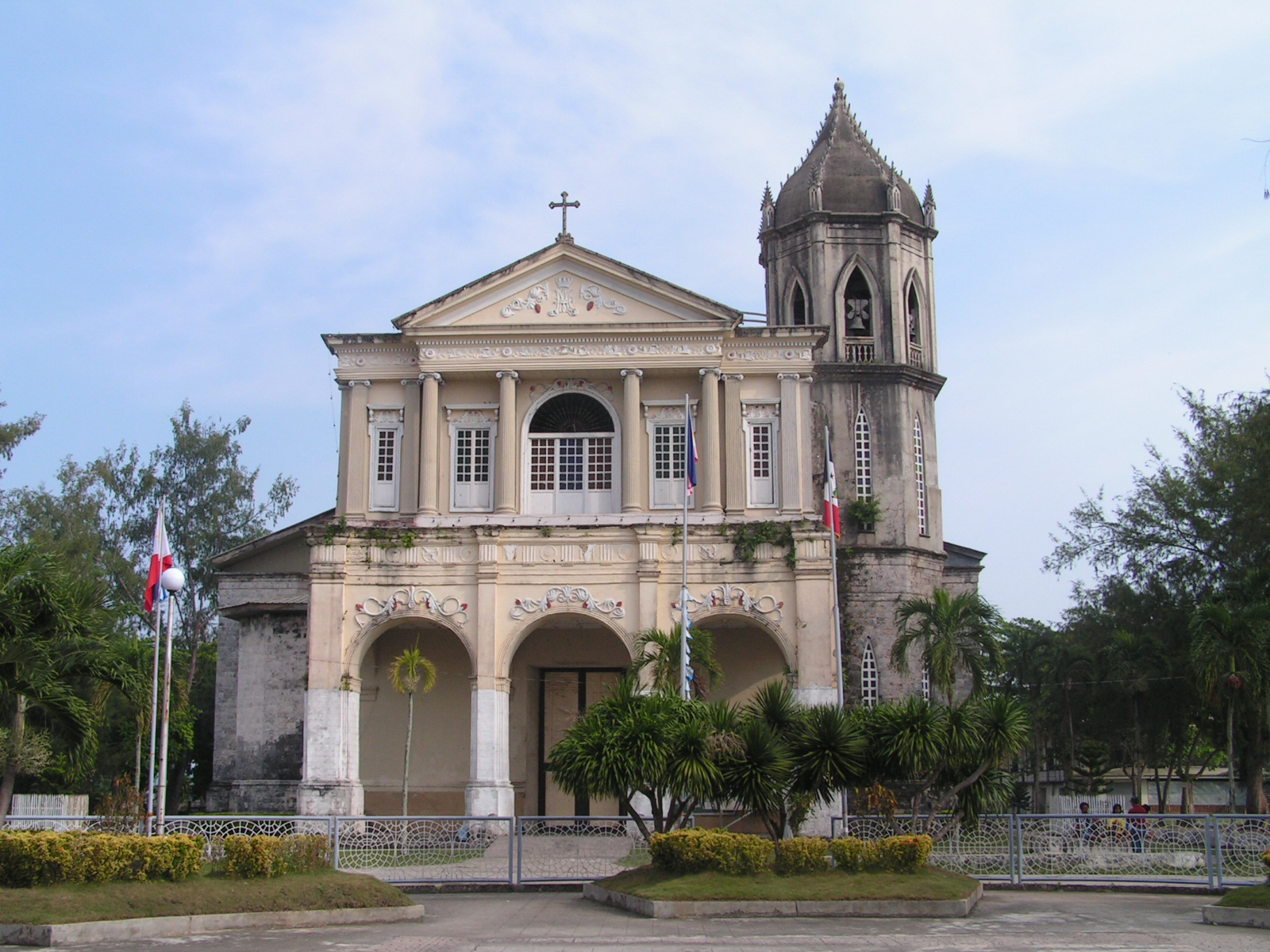
Roman Catholic Church, Dauis

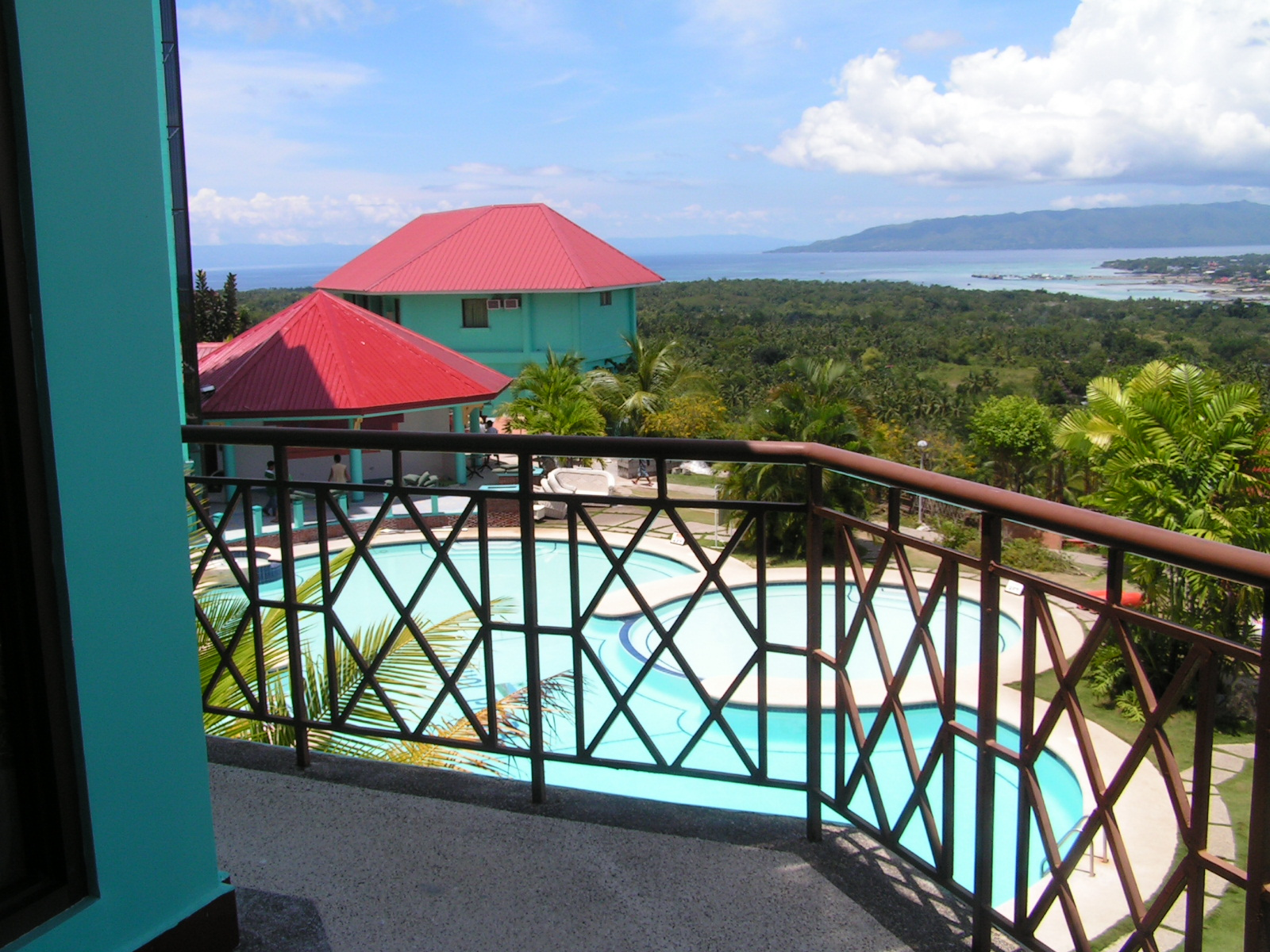
Bohol Plaza Resort, Dauis

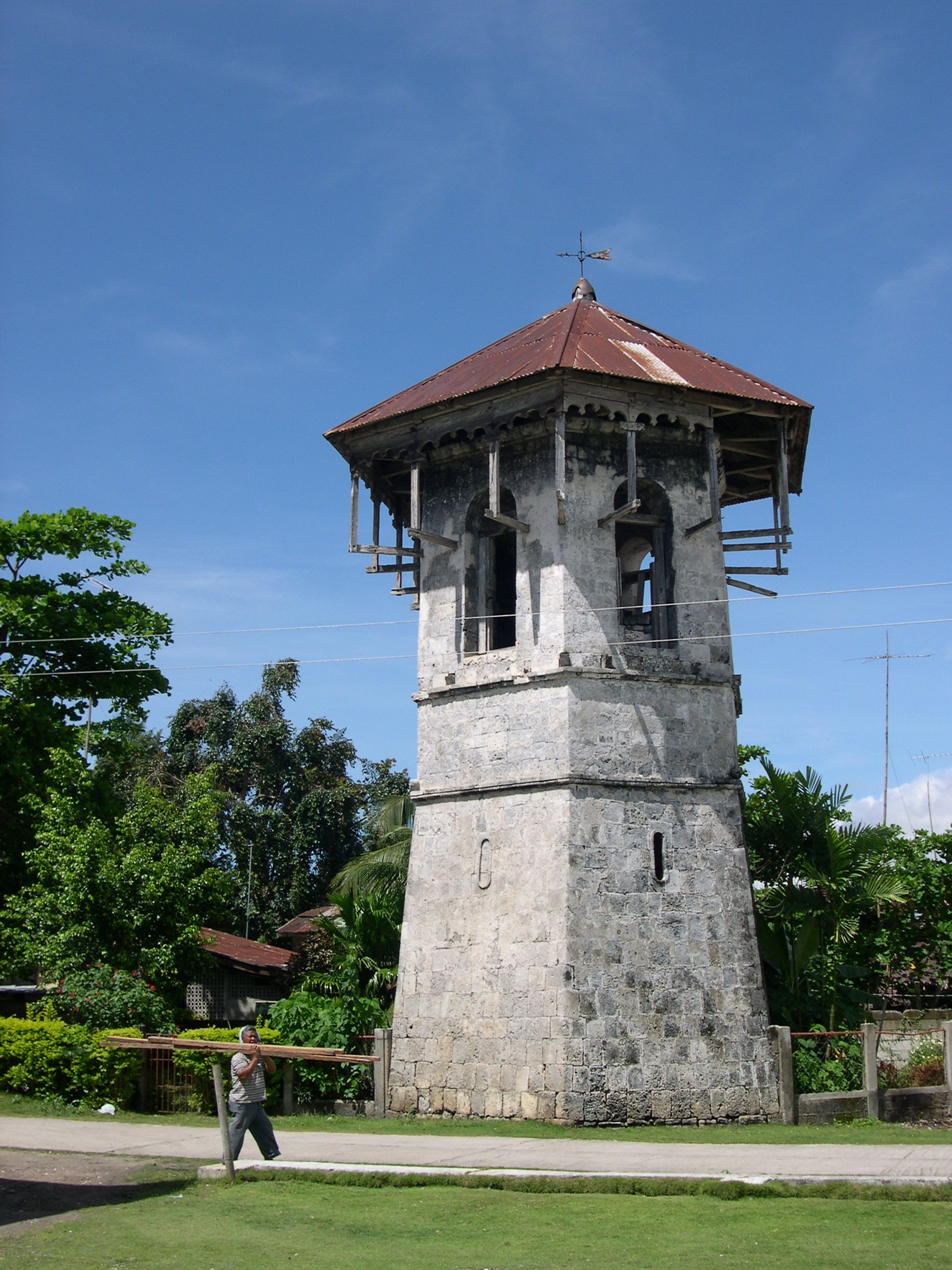
Watchtower in Dauis

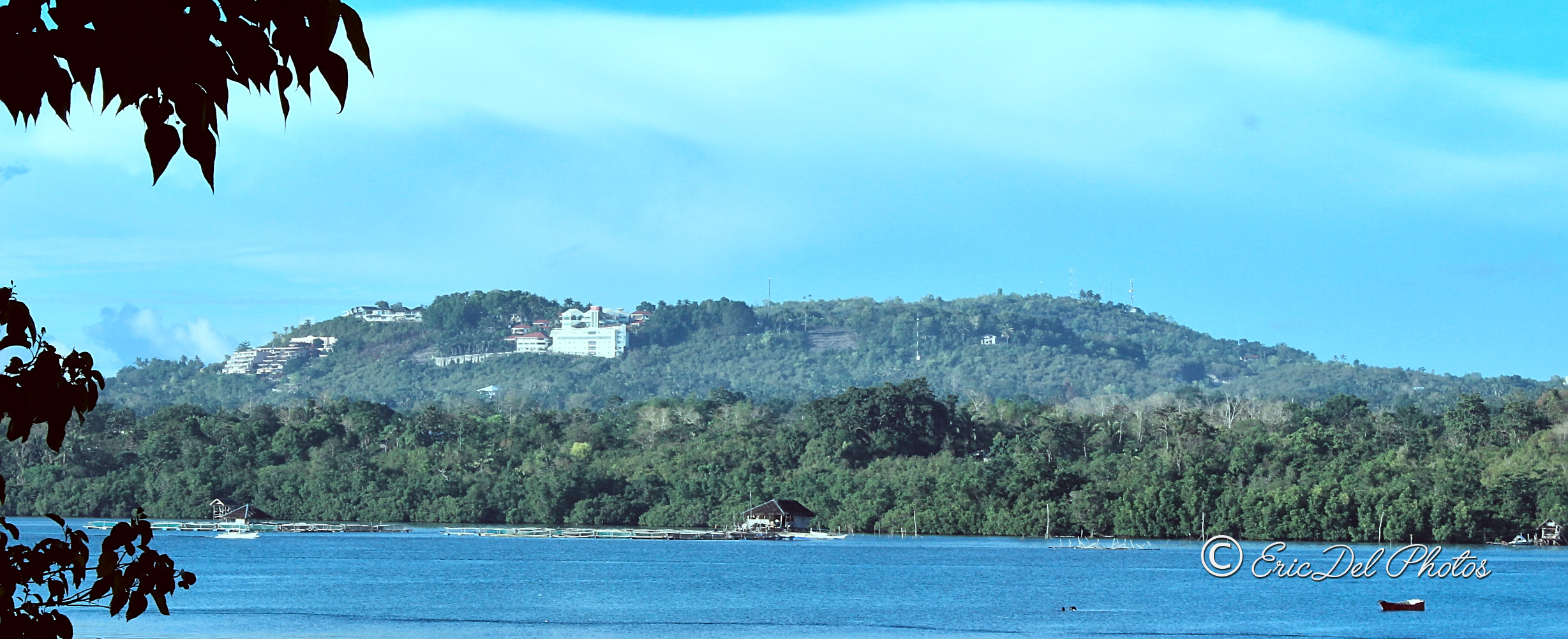
Panoramic view of Dauis
