= Hinagdanan Cave =

Cave in Dauis, Bohol, Philippines

Coordinates: 9°37′31″N 123°48′04″E

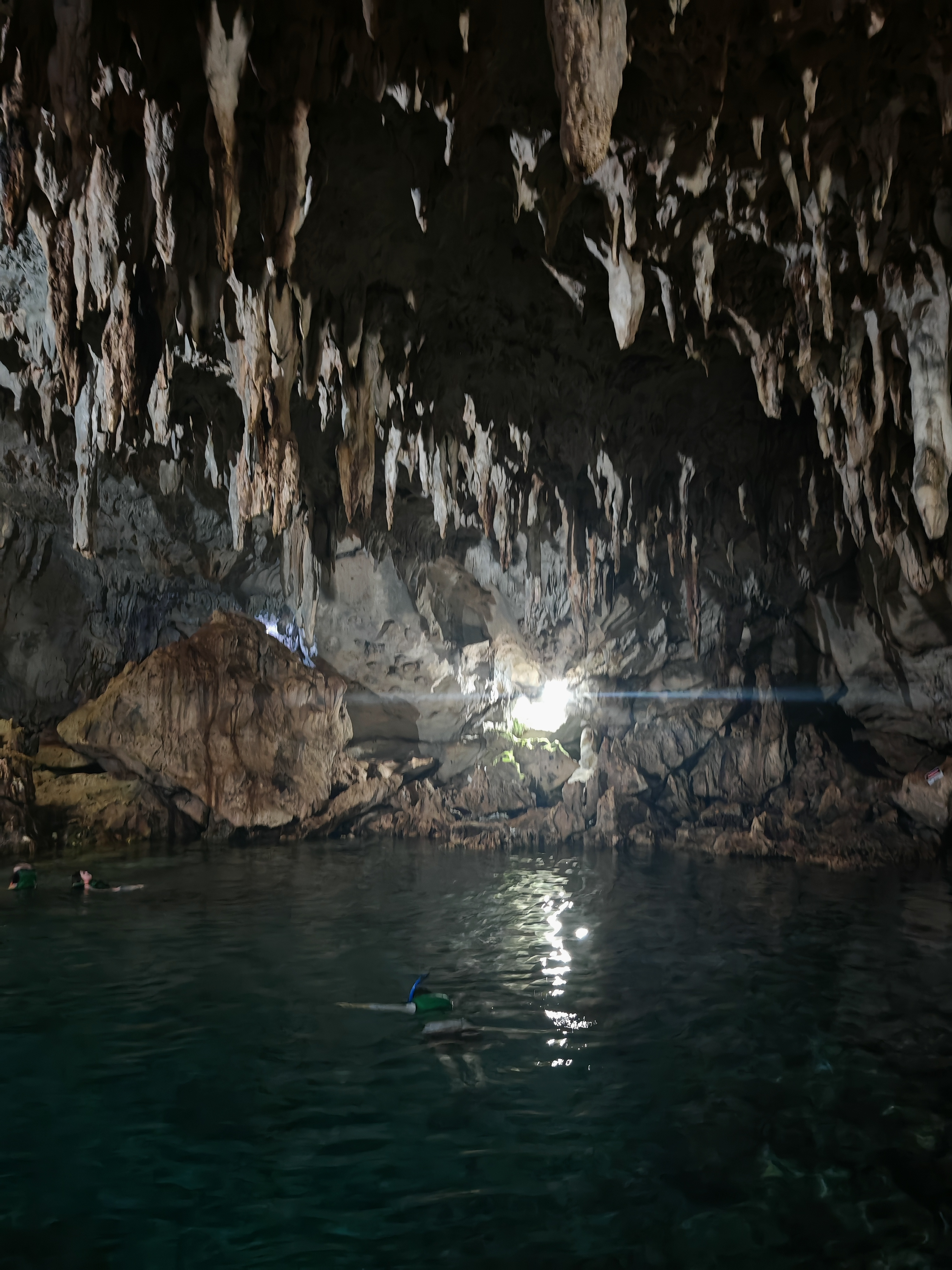
Snorkeling in Hinagdanan Cave

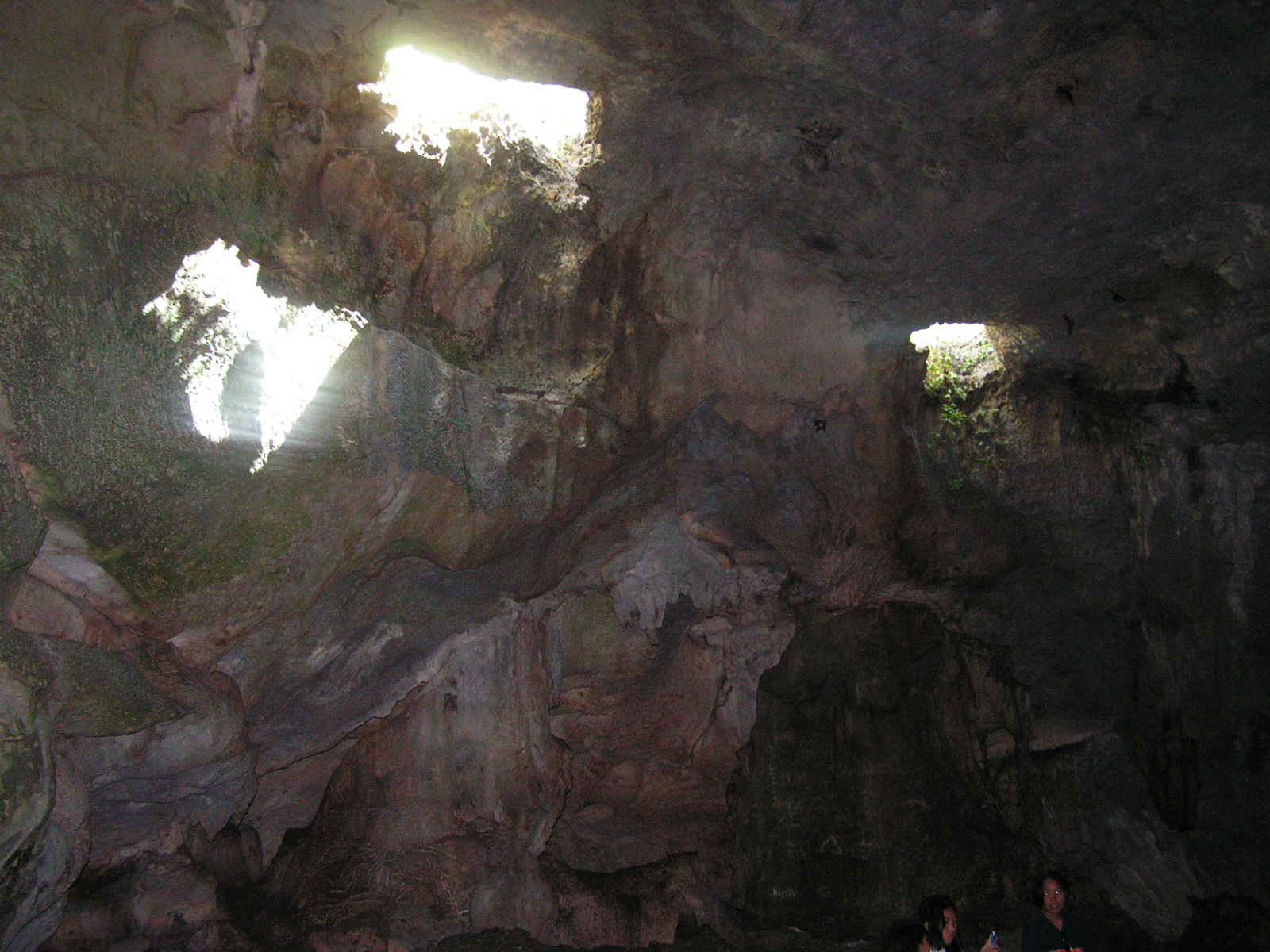
Inside Hinagdanan Cave, Dauis, Bohol

Hinagdanan Cave is a cave in the municipality of Dauis on Panglao Island, in Bohol Province, in the Philippines. It is a naturally lighted cavern with a deep lagoon and many large stalactites and stalagmites.

The cave is lit by sunlight which filters through holes in the ceiling. The underground lake is a popular swimming spot, but it has been known to test for high levels of various pollutants, since it is fed by ground runoff.

Hinagdanan Cave is made of limestone. Its entrance is a hole about 1 metre in diameter, visible from a limestone hill. Cement steps lead to the interior. The cave is slippery, but there's a rope railing to hold on to. The cave is filled with sleeping birds in small holes in the ceiling. The sunlight that enters the cave make it unsuitable for bats.

Hinagdanan Cave was accidentally discovered when the area's owner was clearing decaying branches. He threw a stone into the hole and heard a splash. After building a ladder to enter the cave, he named it Hinagdanan ("laddered").

The cave is about 100 metres long, with many beautiful stalagmite and stalactite rock formations. There is a lagoon with a green hue produced by the green limestone at its bottom. People used to bathe there, but it is no longer advised due to karst pollutants in the water.
