= San Agustin Academy (Panglao) =

Catholic school in Bohol, Philippines

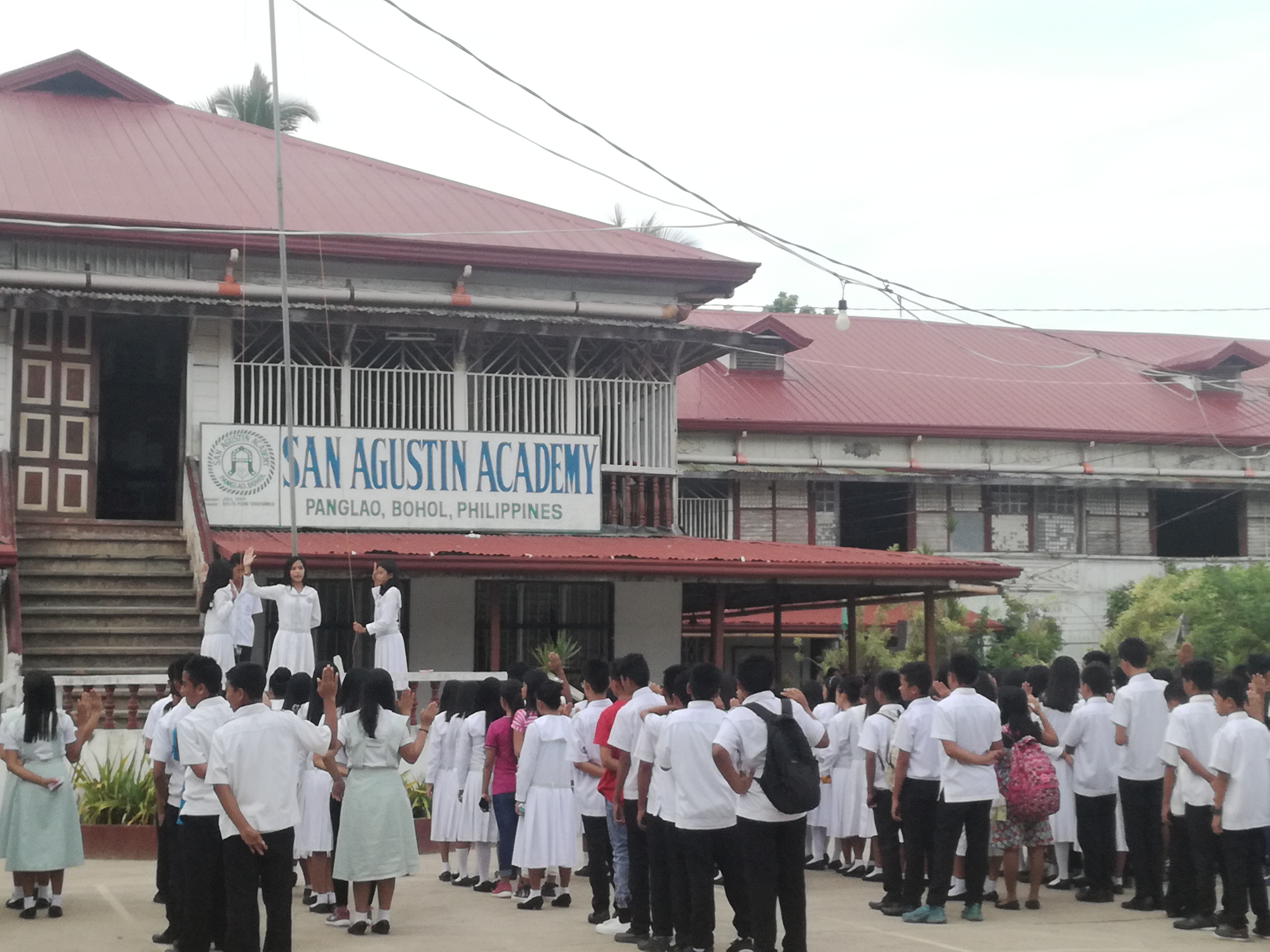

Address
- Poblacion, Panglao, Bohol; Panglao, Bohol; Philippines
- Coordinates: 9°34′40″N 123°44′45″E

Information
- Type: Private
- Patron saint(s): St. Augustine of Hippo
- Founded: July, 1949
- Founder: Pedro Torrefranca
- Principal: Paciencia G. Aranaydo
- Affiliation: Roman Catholic, BACS (Bohol Association of Catholic Schools-Tagbilaran)

San Agustin Academy (SAGA) is a Catholic private institution located near the Panglao Shore, beside St. Augustine Church of Panglao, Bohol, Philippines.

It is run by the Diocese of Tagbilaran-BACS-Bohol Association of Catholic Schools. It is the oldest high school institution of Panglao Town.
