= Panglao Island =

Island in the province of Bohol in the Philippines

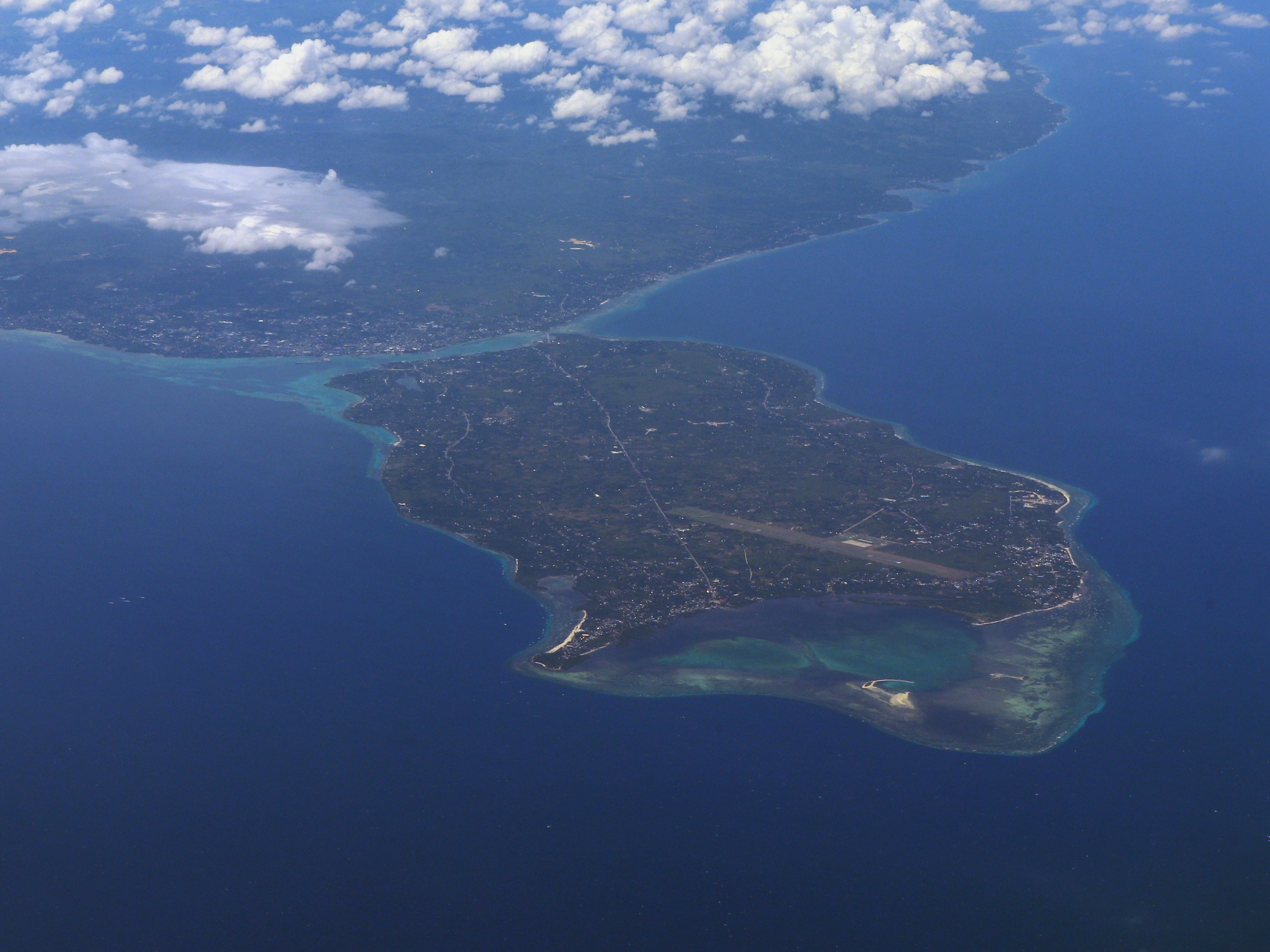
- Aerial view of Panglao Island in August 2023

- Location within Visayas Location within Philippines

Geography
- Location: Bohol Sea
- Coordinates: 9.6°N 123.82°E
- Area: 91.12 km^{2} (35.18 sq mi)
- Length: 16 km (9.9 mi)
- Width: 7.5 km (4.66 mi)

Administration
- Philippines
- Region: Central Visayas
- Province: Bohol
- Municipalities: Dauis; Panglao
- Largest settlement: Dauis (pop. 52,492)

Demographics
- Population: 92,331 (2015)
- Pop. density: 870/km^{2} (2250/sq mi)

Additional information

Panglao is an island in the north Bohol Sea, located in the Central Visayas region of the Visayas island group, in the south-central Philippines.

== Geography ==
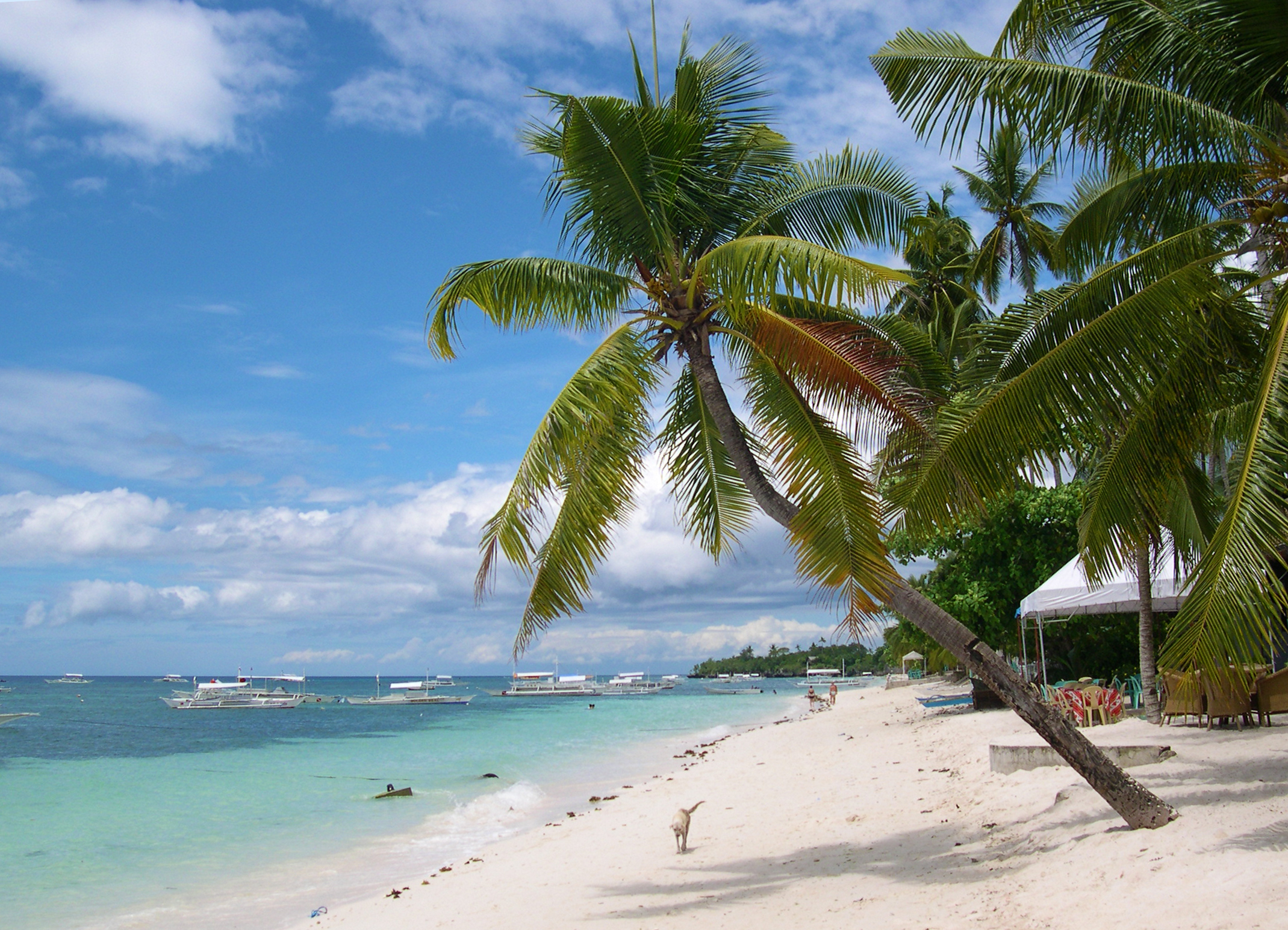
Panglao Island, Bohol

The island has an area of 91.12 square kilometres (35.18 sq mi). It is within Bohol Province, and comprises two municipalities: Dauis and Panglao. Panglao island is located southwest of the island of Bohol and east and south of Cebu.

Panglao has a terrain that ranges from plain, hilly to mountainous. Panglao is made of Maribojoc limestone, the youngest of the limestone units found in the western area of Bohol. The limestone composition delayed the development of the international airport as coralline limestone is soluble which causes formation of caves and sinkholes. One interesting geological feature found in the island is the Hinagdanan Cave which has an underground water source. The cave is an important water source as the island has no rivers or lakes.

Panglao is a popular tourist destination in the Philippines and includes several small islands, such as Gak-ang, Pontod, and Balicasag and is close to Pamalican island.

According to the 2015 census, it has a population of 79,216.

== History ==
=== Precolonial era ===
Panglao was known to Chinese, Malay, Siamese and Indonesian traders. It once housed the precolonial nation or Kedatuan of Bo-ol which fell from an attack by the Ternate Sultanate but was rebuilt as Spanish protectorate in Dapitan City.

The 1818 census showed that Dauis the capital of Panglao, had 2,055 native families and 9 Spanish-Filipino families from Spain and unknown number of Mexicans who had already arrived earlier and had assimilated to the natives.

== Biodiversity ==
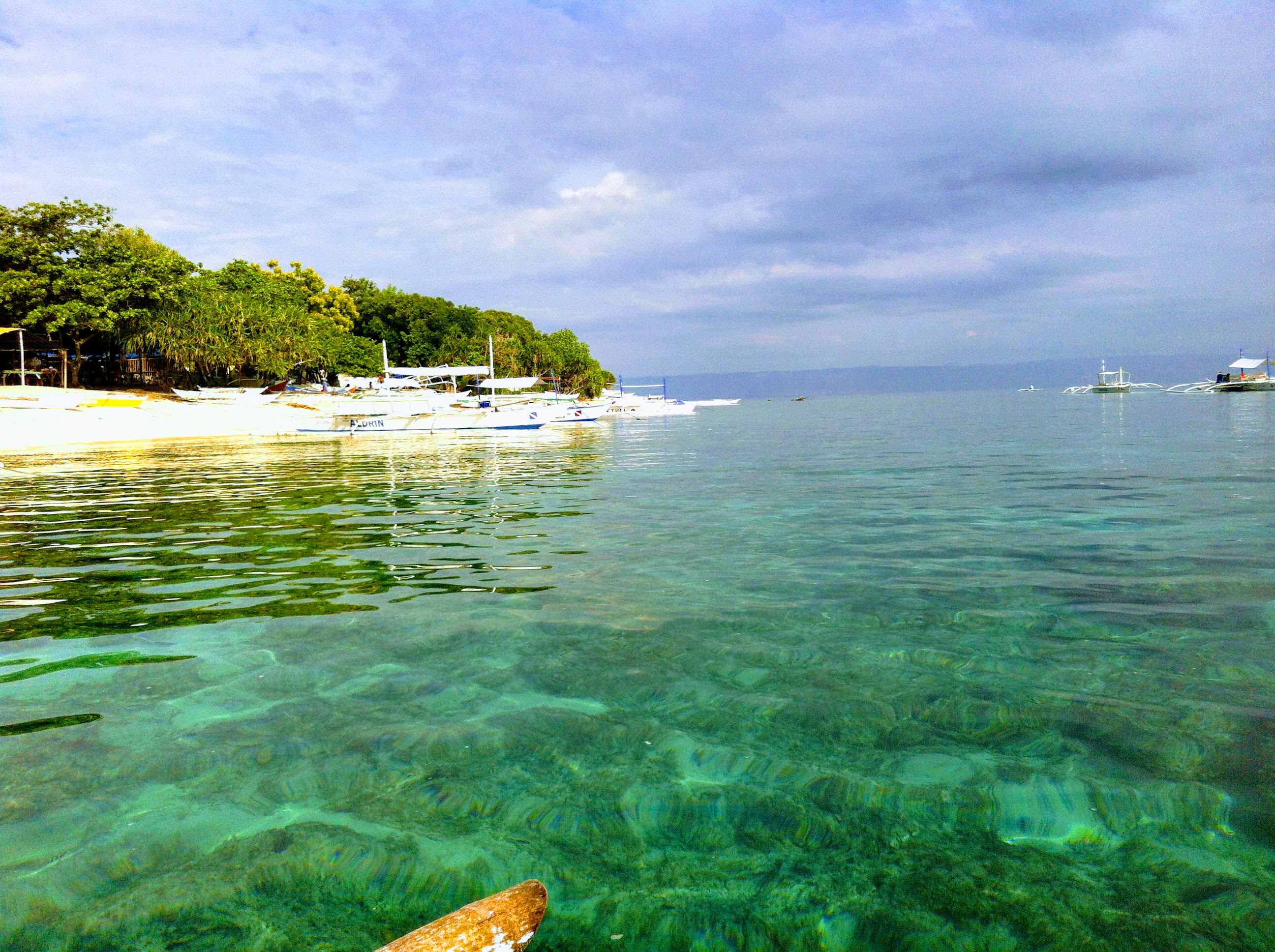
Balicasag Marine Sanctuary

About 250 new species of crustaceans and 2500 new species of mollusks were found around the island. The discovery was the work of the Panglao Marine Biodiversity Project. The project found that Panglao alone has more marine biodiversity than Japan and the Mediterranean Sea.

The Panglao Island Protected Seascape was declared a national park under Republic Act No. 11038 (Expanded National Integrated Protected Areas System Act of 2018) signed by President Rodrigo Duterte in July 2018.

== Tourism ==
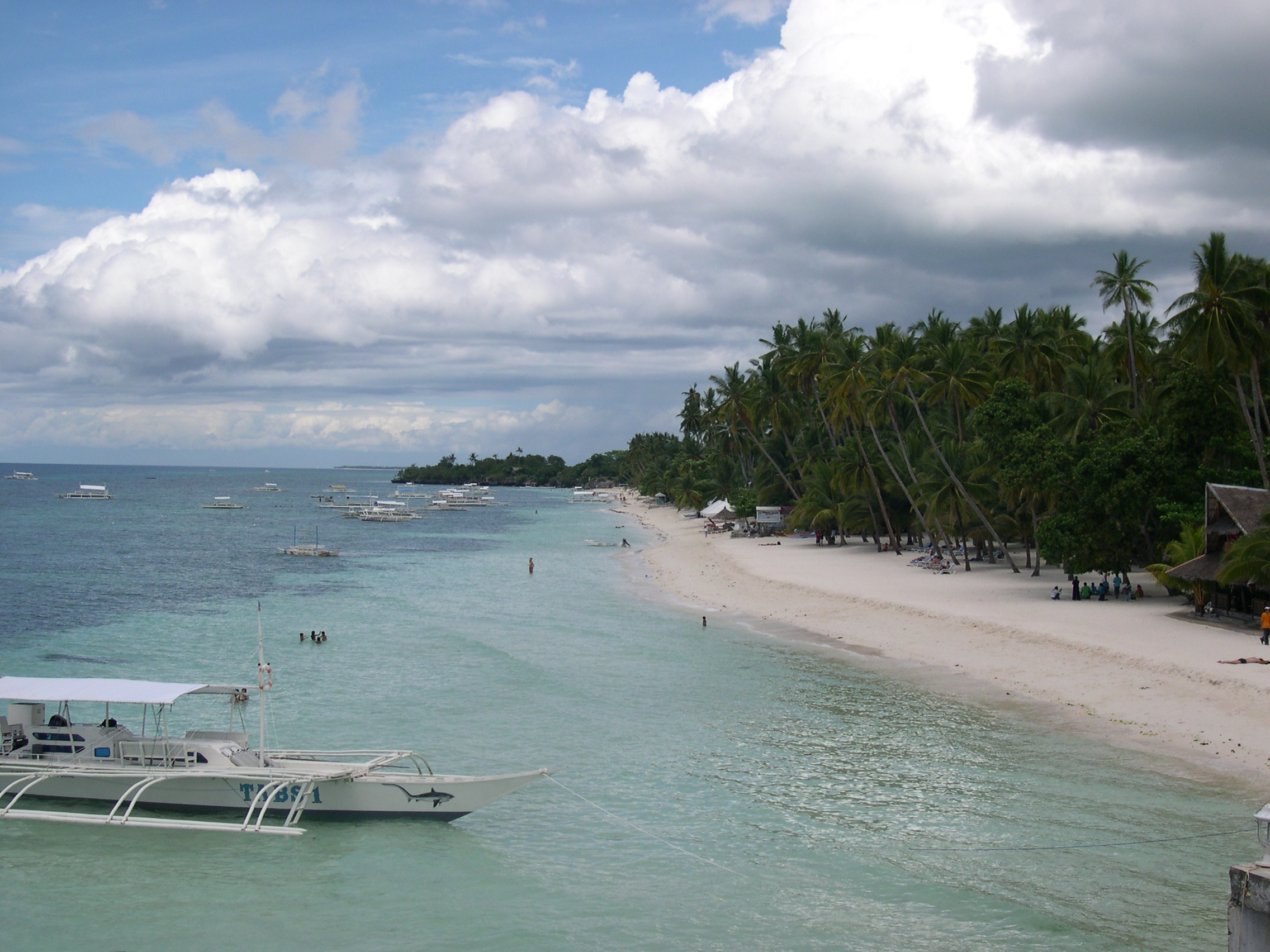
Alona Beach overview

Panglao island is one of the main tourist destinations on the Philippines. Alona Beach is the most popular tourist spot on the island, noted for its white sand and clear water. There are also a lot of attractions to do for tourists such as scuba diving, island hopping, dolphin watching, snorkeling, kitesurfing and fishing.

== Transportation ==
Bohol–Panglao International Airport (TAG/RPSP) is the primary international airport serving the province of Bohol. The airport opened in November 2018, replacing the former Tagbilaran Airport and now serving Panglao Island and the rest of Bohol. There are almost hourly daytime flights to and from Manila operated by Philippine Airlines, Cebu Pacific, and Air Asia. There are also flights to and from Davao and El Nido every second day. International flights recommenced after the pandemic to Korea with up to 3 flights a day, as well as scheduled charter flights from China. It is less than 2 hours of travel time by fast ferry to Cebu.

There is a regular air-conditioned bus service from the airport to Tagbilaran City (Island City Mall and v/v PHP 50 each way) and a circular route to Alona beach. Short trips are usually by Tuk-Tuks or motor tricycle taxis, fares negotiable.

The island is connected with the Bohol main island by two bridges namely the Cong. Suarez Bridge and the Gov. Borja Bridge. A third bridge, also connecting the island to mainland Bohol, is under construction.

== See also ==
- List of islands of the Philippines
- List of protected areas of the Philippines
