= Amor seco =

Amor seco (Spanish: dry love) is a common name for several plants and may refer to:

- Alchornea glandulosa, a tree species of the Acalyphoideae
- Bidens pilosa, an annual herb species in the family Asteraceae
- Chrysopogon aciculatus, a grass species
