= Spanish colonial fortifications in the Philippines =

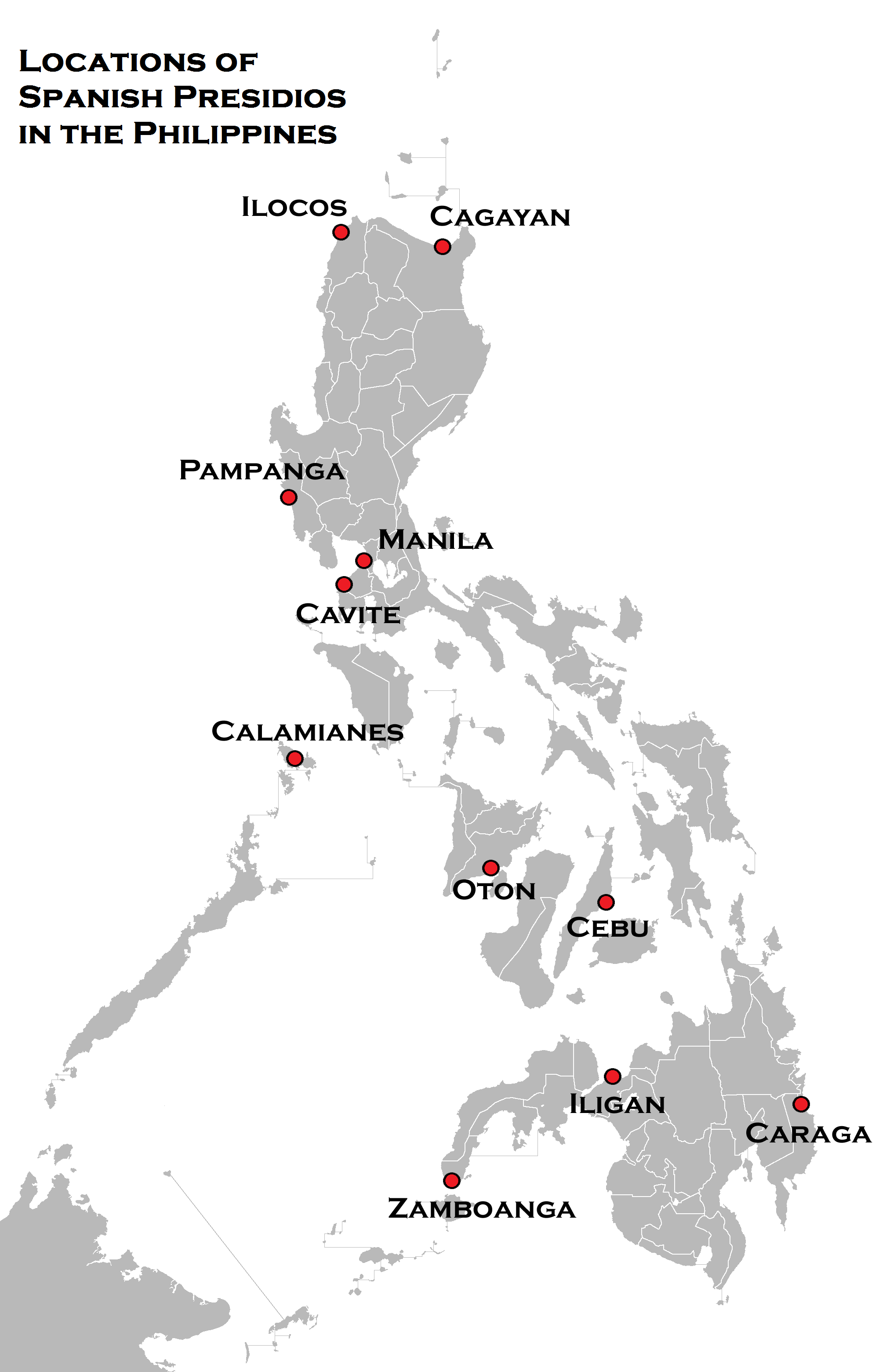
Map of the Presidios built in the Philippines during the 1600s, in Fortress of Empire by Rene Javellana, S. J. (1997)

The Spanish fortifications of the Philippines, or fuerzas, are strongholds constructed by Filipinos and Spaniards primarily for protection against local and foreign aggressors during the Spanish colonial period, and during the subsequent American and Japanese occupations. Structures built included fortresses, watchtowers, and bastions. Many are badly damaged, either due to old age or past conflicts. Currently, there are initiatives for restorations of all forts, beginning when the Baluarte Luna of La Union and the Intramuros of Manila were restored in the 2010s. In 2013, a typhoon and earthquake hit Central Visayas and damaged numerous Spanish fortifications, leading to the largest restoration activity for fortifications in Philippine history.

== List of forts ==
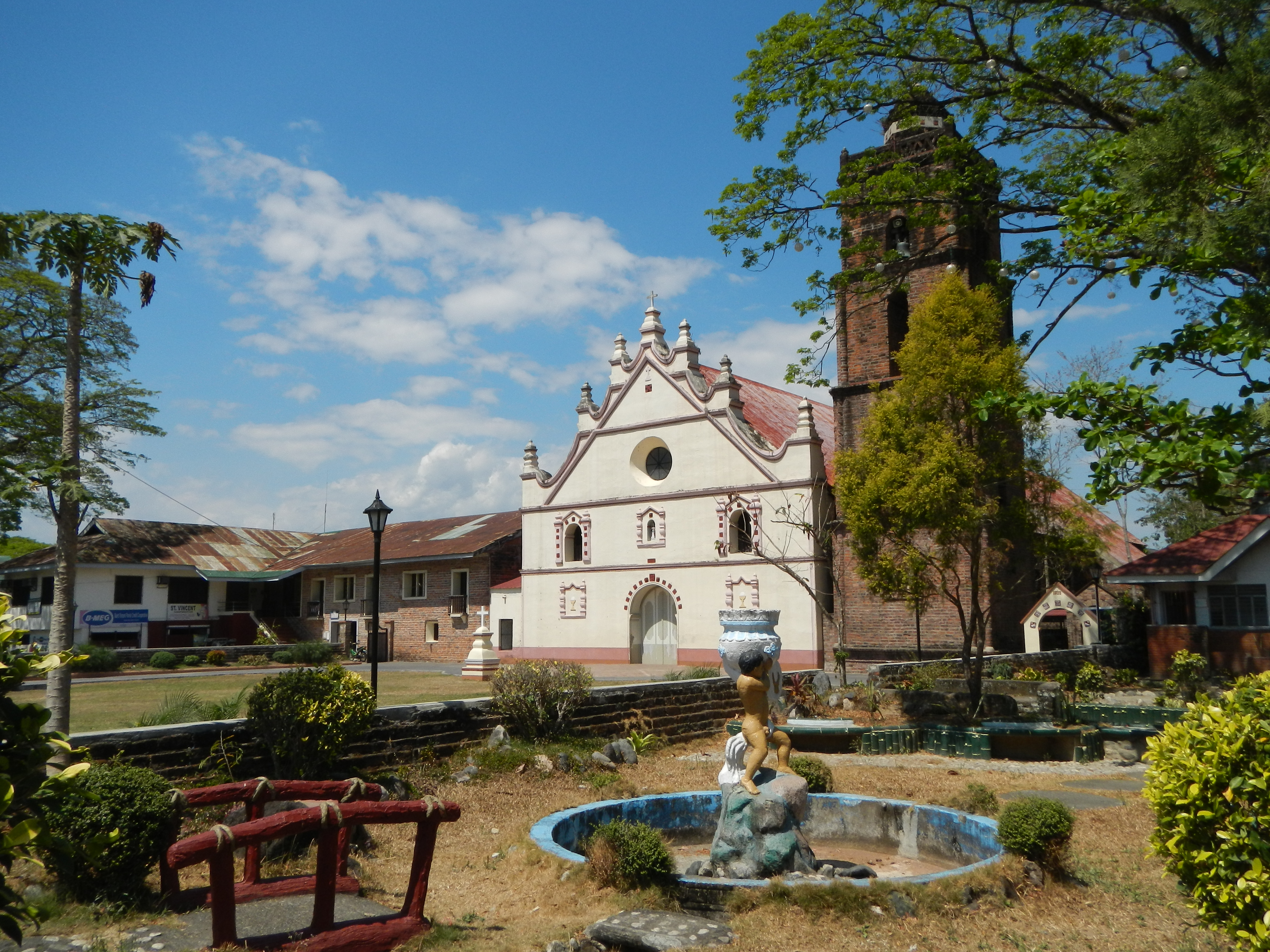
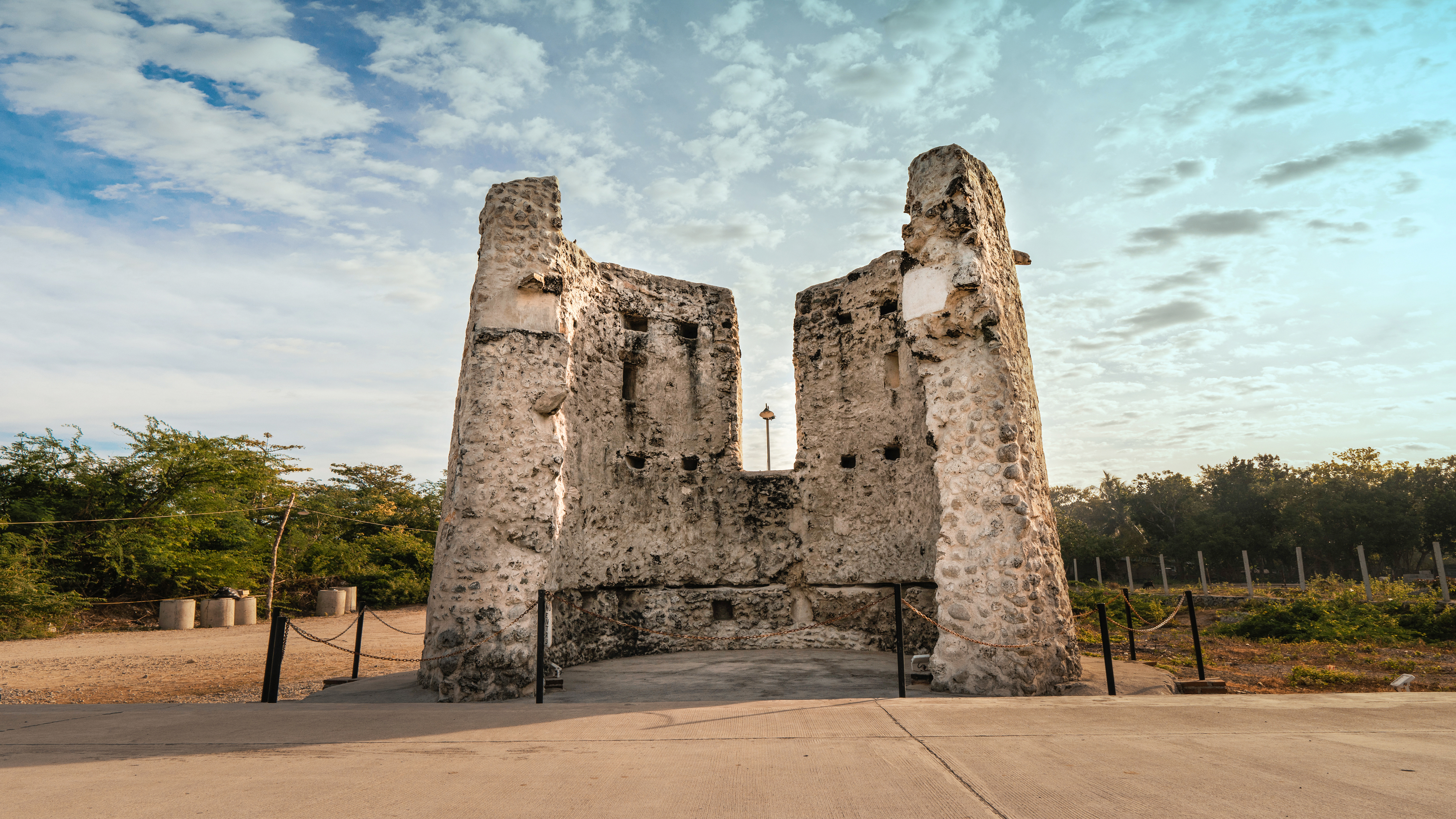
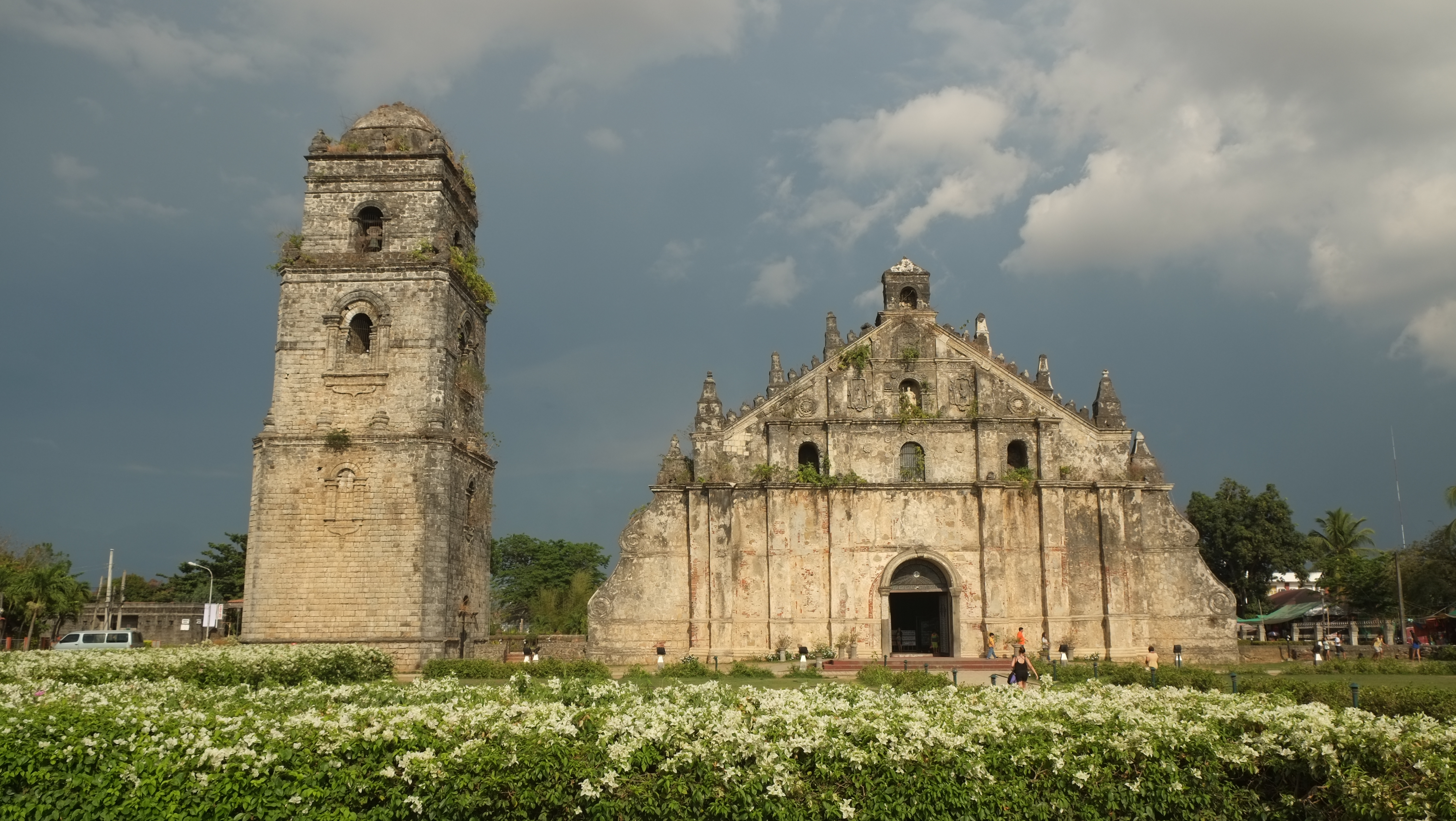
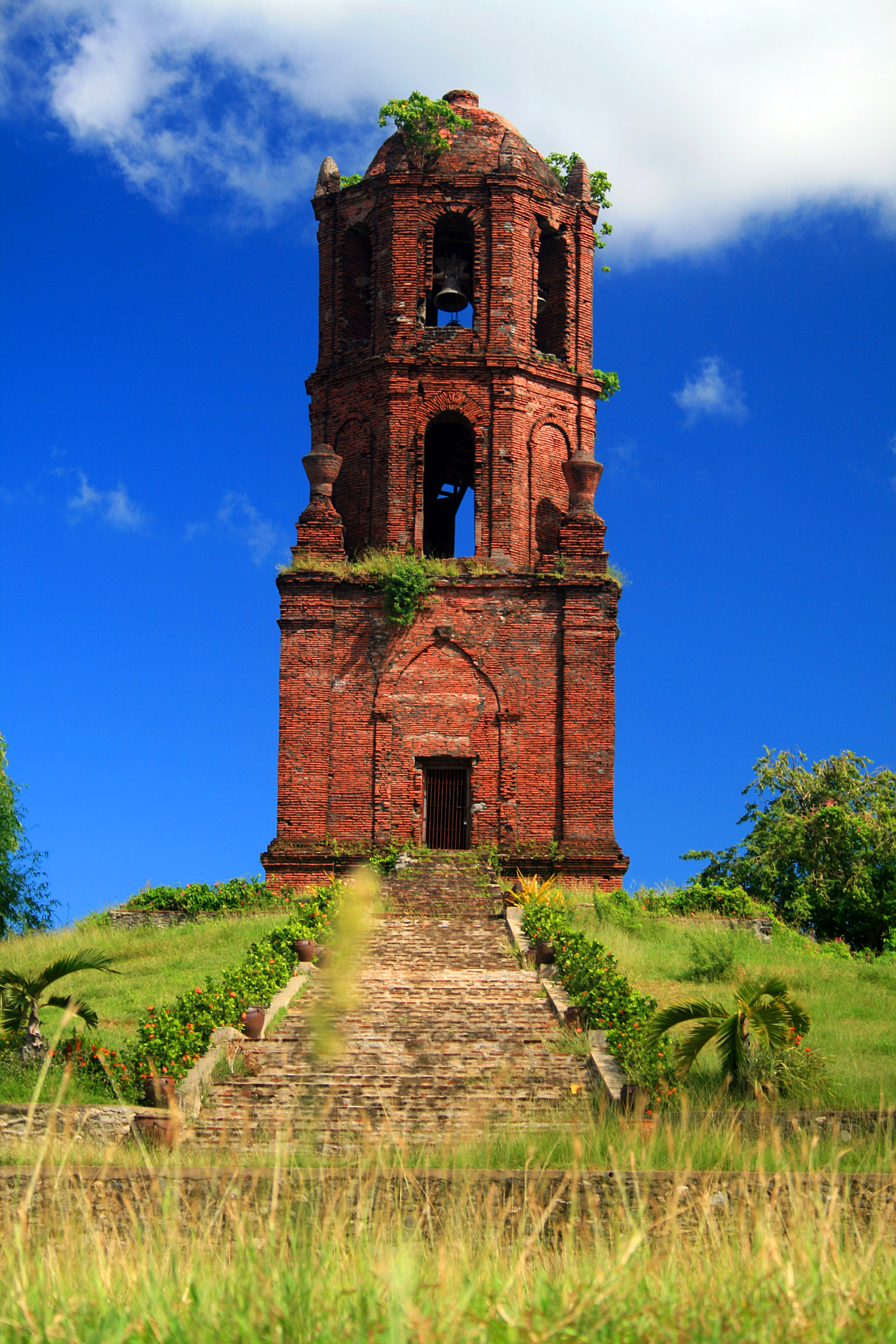
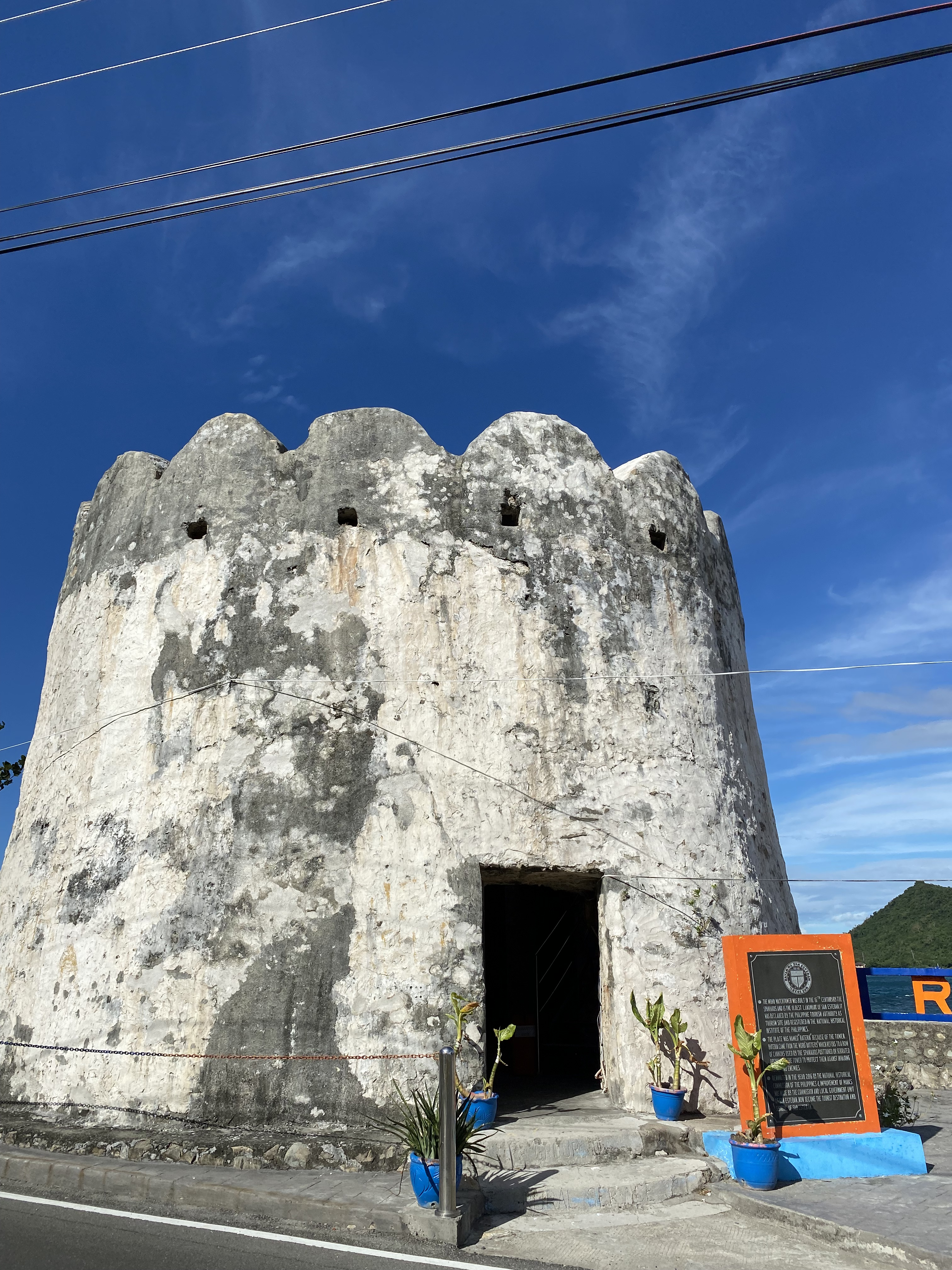
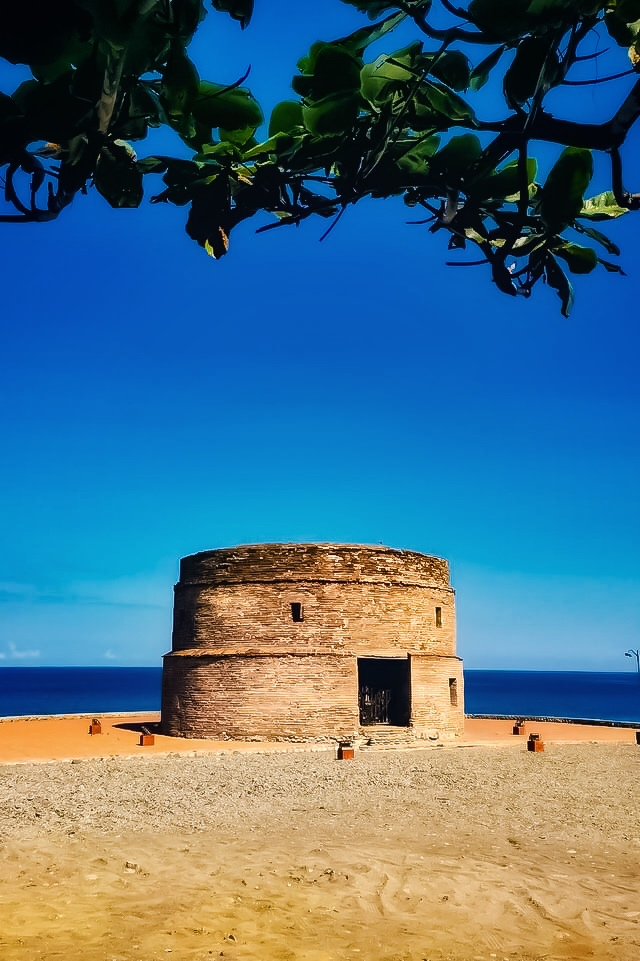
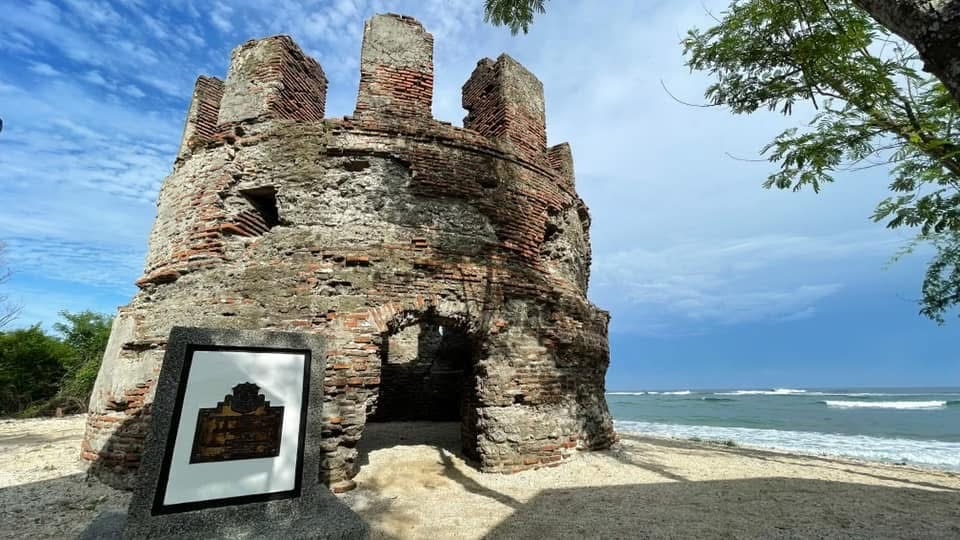
=== Northern Luzon ===
==== Batanes ====
Image	Name	Founded	Location	Condition	Type	Notes
	Fuerza de San Vicente	ca. 1798	Basco	ruin	defense	Remains near Basco Pier
	Fuerza de San Felix	unknown	Mahatao (?)	unknown	defense	status unconfirmed
==== Cagayan ====
Image	Name	Founded	Location	Condition	Type	Notes
	Aparri watchtower	unknown	Aparri, Cagayan	unknown	watchtower	status unconfirmed
	Castillo de San Francisco	ca. 1755	Lal-lo, Cagayan	destroyed	quadrilateral masonry fort	no remains
	Presidio de San José de Capinata	ca. 1755	Lal-lo, Cagayan	destroyed	fort	no remains
	Presidio de San José de Cavicunga	ca. 1755	Claveria, Cagayan	ruin	irregular trapezoidal palisade	no remains
	Fuerza de Tuao	ca. 1738	Tuao, Cagayan	ruin	quadrilateral masonry fort	quadrilateral form still visible
	Fuerza de Cabagan	ca. 1738	Cabagan, Isabela	destroyed	triangular masonry fort	Destroyed by earthquake and transferred to Cavicunga
	Fuerza de Santiago	ca. 1738	Itugud, Isabela	unknown	palisade	status unconfirmed
	Simbahan ng Parokya ni San Vicente Ferrer	1776	Dupax del Sur, Nueva Vizcaya	restored	fortress church
==== Ilocos ====
Image	Name	Founded	Location	Condition	Type	Notes
address: 8HJX+662, pasuquin	Pasuquin watchtower	1851	Pasuquin,Ilocos Norte	restored	watchtower	Botched restoration was subject of controversy
	Vijia watchtower	ca. 1600s	Bacarra, Ilocos Norte	restored	watchtower
address 2F8M+X3G CURRIMAO	Currimao northern watchtower	1893	Currimao, Ilocos Norte	restored	watchtower	One of twin watchtowers of Currimao
	Currimao southern watchtower	1893	Currimao, Ilocos Norte	leftover restored	watchtower	One of twin watchtowers of Currimao
coordinates 17.965362, 120.473401	Gabut norte watchtower	ca. 1800s	Badoc, Ilocos Norte	restored	watchtower	with an observation deck, a fixed staircase leadingup,and a panoramic view
	Iglesia de San Agustin de Paoay	1710	Paoay, Ilocos Norte	restored	fortress church
	Salomague watchtower	ca. 1800s	Cabugao, Ilocos Sur	destroyed	watchtower
	Sinait watchtower	ca. 1800s	Sinait, Ilocos Sur	unknown	watchtower
	Bantay watchtower	1590	Bantay, Ilocos Sur	restored	belfry and watchtower	Part of Bantay Church
	Santa twin watchtowers	ca. 1800s	Santa, Ilocos Sur	unknown	watchtowers	status unconfirmed
arderss: CCWR+PH6, Narvacan,Ilocos sur	Narvacan watchtowers	ca. 1500s	Narvacan, Ilocos Sur	restored	watchtower	with an observation deck, a fixed staircase leading up , and a panoramic view
	San Esteban watchtower	ca. 1500s	San Esteban, Ilocos Sur	restored	circular stone watchtower	with an observation deck, a fixed staircase leading up , and a panoramic view
	Santiago watchtower	ca. 1500s	Santiago, Ilocos Sur	ruins	circular stone watchtower
	Baluarte Luna	c.1600s	Luna, La Union	restored	circular rick watchtower and bastion
	Darigayos watchtower	c. 1600s	Luna, La Union	restored	watchtower	status unconfirmed
	Balaoan watchtower	c. 1600s	Balaoan, La Union	ruin	watchtower	The outside of the building is still standing
	Bacnotan watchtower	c. 1600s	Bacnotan, La Union	ruin	watchtower	Confined within private property
addres: J8M6+3C8,san fernando	San Fernando watchtower	c. 1600s	San Fernando, La Union	Fixer-upper	watchtower	It is accessible; it is on privete property
address: G8G7+MM5 pogo,bauang	Bauang watchtower	c. 1600s	Bauang, La Union	rubble	watchtower	only the foundation remains
address: 5GHF+HH5,laoag city, Hilagang Ilokos	Gabu sur watchtower	c. ?	laoag, La union	restored	watchtower

=== Central and Southeastern Luzon ===
==== Manila ====
Image	Name	Founded	Location	Condition	Type	Notes
	Fuerza de Santiago	1571	Intramuros, Manila	restored	Crown citadel	
	Fuerza de San Antonio Abad	1584	Malate, Manila	restored	Crown defense	
	Corregidor	1570	Corregidor Island	built over by Americans	defense, barracks, bastion, watchtower	
==== Southern Tagalog ====
Image	Name	Founded	Location	Condition	Type	Notes
	Fortaleza de San Felipe	1616	Cavite City, Cavite	restored	Crown defense	
	Porta Vaga	1602	Cavite City, Cavite	ruin	Crown palisade	
	Fuerza de Batangas (?)	unknown	Batangas, Batangas	destroyed	defense	
	Aplaya watchtower	1775	Bauan, Batangas	ruin	watchtower	
	Iglesia Parroquial de la Inmaculada Concepción	1754	Balayan, Batangas	restored	fortress church	Fort itself no longer exists, only the church and convent remain
	Loual watchtower	ca. 1689	Laurel, Batangas	unknown	watchtower	status unconfirmed
	Lemery watchtower	unknown	Lemery, Batangas	unknown	watchtower	status unconfirmed
	Punta Baluarte	unknown	Calatagan, Batangas	unknown	watchtower	status unconfirmed
	Nasugbu twin watchtowers	unknown	Nasugbu, Batangas	unknown	watchtower	status unconfirmed
	Fuerte de la Cota	unknown	Lucena, Quezon	unknown	defense	status unconfirmed
	Kutang San Diego	c.18th century	Gumaca, Quezon	restored	defense	
	Iskong Bantay	1752	Atimonan, Quezon	restored	watchtower	
	Atimonan Church	1752	Atimonan, Quezon	retsored	fortress church	
	Kutang San Pablo	1790	Pitogo, Quezon	restored	watchtower	
	Macalelon watchtower	1784	Macalelon, Quezon	restored	watchtower	Lighthouse built over
	Cuartel de Santo Domingo	1877	Santa Rosa, Laguna	ruin	garrison	
==== Central Luzon ====
Image	Name	Founded	Location	Condition	Type	Notes
	Subic naval station	1885	Subic, Zambales	only restored west gate	fortress	
	La Playa Honda	1738	Iba, Zambales	submerged in lahar	quadrilateral fortress	
	Fortaleza de Mamalas	?	Lubao, Pampanga	palisade	no remains	
	Morong Church	?	Morong, Bataan	fortress church	intact, in good condition	
	Baler naval station	1800s (?)	Baler, Aurora	unknown	naval station	status unconfirmed

=== Mimaropa ===
==== Mindoro and Marinduque ====
Image	Name	Founded	Location	Condition	Type	Notes
	Fuerza de Bongabong	1737	Bongabong, Oriental Mindoro	ruin	garrison	
	Mangarin Fort	1844	San Jose, Occidental Mindoro	ruin	defense	
	Calapan watchtower	unknown	Calapan, Oriental Mindoro	unknown	watchtower	status unconfirmed
	Punta Baluarte	ca. 1800s	San Teodoro, Oriental Mindoro	ruin	defense	
	Parokyang Katedral ng Kalinis-linisang Paglilihi	1580, 1792	Boac, Marinduque	restored	fortress church	
	Boac watchtower	unknown	Boac, Marinduque	ruins	watchtower	Only foundation remains
	Santa Cruz Parish Church	1760	Santa Cruz, Marinduque	restored	fortress church	
	San Isidro Labrador Parish Church	1807	Mogpog, Marinduque	restored	fortress church	
	Lubang watchtower	unknown	Lubang, Occidental Mindoro	unknown	stone watchtower	
==== Palawan and Cuyo Islands ====
Image	Name	Founded	Location	Condition	Type	Notes
	Fuerza de Sta. Isabel	1667	Taytay, Palawan	restored	defense	
	Culion Fort	1683	Culion, Palawan	restored	defense	
	Dumaran Church and watchtower	unknown	Dumaran, Palawan	destroyed, Church restored	fortress church and wooden watchtower	
	Silanga Church and watchtower	unknown	Taytay, Palawan	destroyed, Church restored	church fortress and palisade	
	Plaza Cuartel	unknown	Puerto Princesa, Palawan	restored	garrison	
	Fuerza de Caseledan	1690	Linapacan, Palawan	restored	defense	
	Fuerza de Cuyo	1680	Cuyo, Palawan	restored	pentagonal fortress	
	Fuerza de Cagayancillo	ca. 1710	Cagayancillo, Palawan	ruin	defense	Took nearly 130 years to finish construction
	Lucbuan Fort	unknown	Magsaysay, Palawan	ruin	defense	
	Baluarte de San Juan Bautista	1683	Agutaya, Palawan	restored	defense	
==== Romblon ====
Image	Name	Founded	Location	Condition	Type	Notes
	Twin Forts of Romblon	1645	Romblon, Romblon	restored	defense	
	Fuerza de San José	1645	Banton, Romblon	under restoration	defense	

=== Bicol ===
==== Camarines & Albay ====
Image	Name	Founded	Location	Condition	Type	Notes
	Libmanan Fort	?	Libmanan, Camarines Sur	unknown	stockade fortress	status unconfirmed
	Fuerza de San Fernando de Malaguit	1756	Paracale, Camarines Norte	destroyed	fortress	status unconfirmed
	Panganiban watchtowers	?	Jose Panganiban, Camarines Norte	ruin	watchtower	one tower remains
	Daet watchtower	?	Daet, Camarines Norte	unknown	watchtower	status unconfirmed
	Talisay watchtower	?	Talisay, Camarines Norte	unknown	watchtower	status unconfirmed
	Vinzons (Indan) watchtower	?	Vinzons, Camarines Norte	unknown	watchtower	status unconfirmed
	Capalonga watchtowers	?	Capalonga, Camarines Norte	unknown	watchtower	status unconfirmed
	Sinimbahanan	1658	Tiwi, Albay	ruin	fortress church and watchtower	
	Dakulang Simbahan	1879	Tabaco, Albay	restored	watchtower belfry	
	Malinao watchtower	?	Malinao, Albay	unknown	watchtower	status unconfirmed
	Libon watchtowers	?	Libon, Albay	unknown	watchtowers	three watchtowers, status unconfirmed
==== Sorsogon ====
Image	Name	Founded	Location	Condition	Type	Notes
	Fuerza de Sorsogon	1799	Sorsogon City, Sorsogon	destroyed	fortress	
	Casiboran watchtower	1799	Sorsogon City, Sorsogon	unknown	watchtower	status unconfirmed
	Capuy watchtower	1799	Sorsogon City, Sorsogon	unknown	watchtower	status unconfirmed
	Intramuros	1799	Sorsogon City, Sorsogon	ruin	citadel with bastions	Ruins within the public market
	Bacon watchtower	1799	Sorsogon City, Sorsogon	unknown	watchtower	status unconfirmed
	Manlalabong watchtower	1799	Sorsogon City, Sorsogon	unknown	watchtower	status unconfirmed
	Montufar Point watchtower	1799	Sorsogon City, Sorsogon	unknown	watchtower	status unconfirmed
	Sogod watchtower	1799	Sorsogon City, Sorsogon	unknown	watchtower	status unconfirmed, site uncertain
	Bilar watchtower	1799	Sorsogon City, Sorsogon	unknown	watchtower	status unconfirmed, site uncertain
	Pinatolan watchtower	1799	Sorsogon City, Sorsogon	unknown	watchtower	status unconfirmed, site uncertain
	Fuerza de Monreal	1799	Gubat, Sorsogon	ruin	fortress	
	Bagacay watchtower	1799 (?)	Gubat, Sorsogon	ruin	watchtower	
	Ariman watchtower	1799	Gubat, Sorsogon	unknown	watchtower	status unconfirmed
	Danglog watchtower	1799	Gubat, Sorsogon	unknown	watchtower	status unconfirmed
	Tagdon watchtower	1799	Gubat, Sorsogon	unknown	watchtower	status unconfirmed
	Bulusan watchtower	1799	Bulusan, Sorsogon	unknown	watchtower	status unconfirmed
	Macabare watchtower	1799	Bulusan, Sorsogon	unknown	watchtower	status unconfirmed
	Matnog watchtower	1799	Matnog, Sorsogon	unknown	watchtower	status unconfirmed
	Bulan watchtowers	1799	Bulan, Sorsogon	unknown	watchtowers	status unconfirmed, four watchtowers
	Boton wawtchtower	1799	Casiguran, Sorsogon	unknown	watchtower	status unconfirmed
	Casiguran watchtower	1799	Casiguran, Sorsogon	ruin	watchtower	visible at low tide, other reported watchtowers status unconfirmed
	Maohon watchtower	1799	Casiguran, Sorsogon	unknown	watchtower	status unconfirmed
	Ibalon watchtower	1799	Magallanes, Sorsogon	unknown	watchtower	status unconfirmed
	Bagatao watchtower	1799	Magallanes, Sorsogon	unknown	watchtower	status unconfirmed
	Juban Fort	1799	Juban, Sorsogon	destroyed	palisade and watchtowers	no remains
	Juban stone watchtwer	1799	Juban, Sorsogon	submerged, ruin	watchtower	poor condition
	Donsol watchtower	1799	Donsol, Sorsogon	unknown	watchtower	status unconfirmed
	Donsol Viejo watchtower	1799	Donsol, Sorsogon	unknown	watchtower	status unconfirmed
	Santa Magdalena watchtower	1799	Santa Magdalena, Sorsogon	unknown	watchtower	status unconfirmed
==== Masbate ====
Image	Name	Founded	Location	Condition	Type	Notes
	El Invincible de Obando	1752	Masbate	destroyed	quadrilateral fortress	
	Baleno watchtower	?	Baleno, Masbate	unknown	watchtower	status unconfirmed
	San Jacinto watchtower	1799	Ticao Island	unknown	watchtower	status unconfirmed

=== Western Visayas ===
==== Panay & Guimaras ====
Image	Name	Founded	Location	Condition	Type	Notes
	Fuerza de la Nuestra Señora del Rosario	1602	Iloilo City, Iloilo	destroyed	Crown quadrilateral fortress	
	Guimbal watchtowers	c.17th century	Guimbal, Iloilo	two restored, three ruins	watchtower	
	Roxas Fort	1738	Roxas City, Capiz	destroyed	Crown earthenwork palisade	
	Roxas watchtowers	1738 (?)	Roxas City, Capiz	ruins	stone watchtowers	
	St. Catherine of Alexandria Parish Church	1606	Mambusao, Capiz	fortress church remains	fortress church and wooden palisade	
	Miagao Church	1731	Miagao, Iloilo	good condition	fortress church	
	Hamtic Fort	?	Hamtic, Antique	destroyed	fortress (probably palisade)	
	Semirara Fort	unknown	Semirara, Antique	unknown	defense (?)	
==== Negros ====
Image	Name	Founded	Location	Condition	Type	Notes
	Bacolod watchtower	?	Bacolod, Negros Occidental	destroyed	watchtower	
	Dumaguete watchtower	early 1800s	Dumaguete, Negros Oriental	good condition	watchtower and belfry	
	Dauin watchtowers	early 1700s	Dauin, Negros Oriental	ruins	watchtowers	Uncompleted even in the colonial period

=== Central Visayas ===
==== Cebu ====
Image	Name	Founded	Location	Condition	Type	Notes
	Fuerte de San Pedro	1630	Cebu City, Cebu	intact, good condition	Crown triangular fortress	
	Danao Church - Fort System	1755	Danao, Cebu	intact, good condition - fort and palisade destroyed	fortress church, stone fort, and wooden palisade	
	Argao Church	1788	Argao, Cebu	citadel intact and in good condition	citadel with fortress church, fortified houses, and one ston watchtower	
	Boljoon Church	1783	Boljoon, Cebu	citadel largely intact and in good condition, ruined walls	citadel with fortress church and watchtower	
	Sogod Church	1832	Sogod, Cebu	church intact and in good condition, two bastions ruined	fortress church and bastions	
	Catmon Da-an	?	Catmon, Cebu	ruin	fortress?	scheduled for demolition
	Oslob watchtower	1788	Oslob, Cebu	ruin	watchtower	
	Bantayan sa Hari	1800s	Mandaue, Cebu	intact, in good condition	watchtower	
	Daanbantayan watchtower	?	Daanbantayan, Cebu	unknown	watchtower	status unconfirmed
	Minglanilla watchtower	?	Minglanilla, Cebu	intact, restored	watchtower	
	Carcar watchtowers	1604 (?)	Carcar, Cebu	ruin	three watchtowers	
	Dalaguete watchtowers	1768	Dalaguete, Cebu	intact, restored	watchtowers	one watchtower in town, one on hill nearby
	Obong watchtower	1825	Dalaguete, Cebu	ruin	watchtower	
	Coro watchtower	?	Dalaguete, Cebu	ruin	watchtower	
	Alcoy watchtower	?	Alcoy, Cebu	intact, in good condition	watchtower	
	Caceres watchtower	1800s	Oslob, Cebu	intact, in good condition	watchtower	
	Looc watchtower	1800s	Oslob, Cebu	intact, in poor condition	watchtower	
	Daang Lungsod Fort	1789	Oslob, Cebu	intact, in good condition	fortress with bastions	
	Daang Lungsod watchtower	1789	Oslob, Cebu	intact, in poor condition	watchtower	
	10 watchtowers form Brgy. Gawi to Pungtod	1800s(?)	Oslob, Cebu	unknown	watchtower	status unconfirmed
	Samboan watchtower	1800s(?)	Samboan, Cebu	intact, in good condition	watchtower	
	Sumilon watchtower	1800s(?)	Oslob, Cebu	unknown	watchtower	
	Aloguinsan watchtower	1800s	Aloguinsan, Cebu	ruin	watchtower	
	Presidio de Lawis	1628-1630	Madridejos, Cebu	ruin	quadrilateral bastioned fortress	
	Fuerza de Santa Fe	1790	Santa Fe, Cebu	ruin	quadrilateral bastioned fortress	
	Bantayan Church	1580	Bantayan, Cebu	intact, in good condition	fortress church	
	Bantayan watchtower	1790	Bantayan, Cebu	destroyed	watchtower	
	Punta Baluarte	1800s	Bantayan, Cebu	unknown	watchtower	status unconfirmed
	Poro watchtower	1800s	Poro, Cebu	ruin	watchtower	
	San Francisco watchtower	1800s	San Francisco, Cebu	ruin	watchtower	
==== Bohol ====
Image	Name	Founded	Location	Condition	Type	Notes
	Tagbilaran Cathedral	1595	Tagbilaran, Bohol	good condition	fortress church	
	Baclayon Church	1596	Baclayon, Bohol	good condition	fortress church	
	Baclayon watchtower	?	Baclayon, Bohol	destroyed	watchtower	
	Loay Church	1822	Loay, Bohol	good condition	fortress church	
	Loay watchtower	?	Loay, Bohol	ruin	watchtower	
	Dimiao Fort	?	Dimiao, Bohol	destroyed	fortress	
	Dimiao watchtower	?	Dimiao, Bohol	destroyed	watchtower	near church, foundations remain
	Loboc Church	1596	Loboc, Bohol	good condition	fortress church and bastion	bastion converted into cistern behind convent
	Maribojoc Church	1767 or 1768	Maribojoc, Bohol	good condition	fortress church	
	Fuerte de San Vicente Ferrer (Punta Cruz)	1796	Maribojoc, Bohol	restored	watchtower	
	Talibon Church	1800s	Talibon, Bohol	intact, restored	fortress church	
	Talibon watchtower	?	Talibon, Bohol	destroyed	wooden watchtower	
	Jagna Church	1631	Jagna, Bohol	intact, restored	fortress church	
	Balilihan watchtowers	1840	Balilihan, Bohol	intact, poor condition	watchtower belfry	
	Dauis watchtower	1796	Dauis, Bohol	restored	watchtower	
	Panglao watchtower	1851	Panglao, Bohol	intact	watchtower	
	Pamilacan Fort	1800s	Pamilacan, Bohol	ruin	triangular fortress	
	Cabilao watchtower	1700s(?)	Cabilao Island, Bohol	ruin	watchtower	foundations remain
==== Siquijor ====
Image	Name	Founded	Location	Condition	Type	Notes
	Siquijor watchtower	?	Siquijor	intact, in good condition	watchtower	
	Enrique Villanueva watchtower	?	Siquijor	ruin	watchtower	

=== Eastern Visayas ===
==== Leyte ====
Image	Name	Founded	Location	Condition	Type	Notes
	Carigara Fort	1700s	Carigara, Leyte	ruin, barely visible	fortress	
	Carigara watchtower	1700s	Carigara, Leyte	intact, in poor condition	watchtower	
	Palompon Fort	1700s	Palompon, Leyte	destroyed	fortress (palisade?)	
	Palo Church	1718	Palo, Leyte	destroyed, new Palo Cathedral built over	fortress church	
	Tanauan Church	1704	Tanauan, Leyte	ruin	fortress church	
	Ormoc Church	1700s	Ormoc, Leyte	bastion intact	fortress church with bastions	
	Hilongos Church	1700s	Hilongos, Leyte	intact, in good condition	fortress church with bastions	
	San Juanico Strait watchtowers	1700s(?)	Babatngon, Leyte	unknown	watchowers	status unconfirmed
	Matalom watchtower	1841	Matalom, Leyte	intact, in good condition	watchtower	
	Maasin Fort	1700s	Maasin, Southern Leyte	intact, in god condition	quadrilateral fortress	
	Sogod watchtower	180s(?)	Sogod, Southern Leyte	ruin	watchtower	
	Maasin watchtower	1700s	Maasin, Southern Leyte	intact, restored	watchtower	
==== Samar ====
Image	Name	Founded	Location	Condition	Type	Notes
	Fuerza de Capul	1596	Capul, Northern Samar	ruin	fortress church	
	Capul watchtower	?	Capul, Northern Samar	intact, in good condition	watchtower	
	Fuerza de Almuraya & Laoang Church	1600s	Laoang, Northern Samar	both fortress and fortress church intact and in good condition	fortress and fortress church	
	Fuerza de San Ignacio, Simbahan ng San Ignacio	1649-1650	Palapag, Northern Samar	both fortress and fortress church intact and in good condition, ruined	quadrilatral fortress and fortress church	
	Tubig Church	1700s	Taft, Eastern Samar	ruin	fortress church with bastions	
	Sulat Church	1700s	Sulat, Eastern Samar	intact, modern renovation built over	fortress church with bastions	
	Guiain Fort and Church	1754	Guiuan, Eastern Samar	both intact, in god condition	quadrilateral fortress with bastions and fortress church	
	Basey Church	1700s (?)	Basey, Samar	old walls remain	fortress church	
	Paranas Fort	1700s (?)	Paranas, Samar	unknown	fortress	
	Catbalogan Fort and Church	1700s	Catbalogan, Samar	both intact, in good condition	fortress and fortress church with bastions	
	Zumarraga Fort	1700s (?)	Zumarraga, Samar	unknown	fortress	status unconfirmed
	Biliran Fort	1765 (?)	Biliran, Biliran	ruin	quadrilateral fortress	Probably constructed by Gaspar Ignacio de Guevara, leader of a breakaway religious movement from the Catholic Church
	Nasunugan Watchtower	1765	Biliran, Biliran	intact, ruin	watchtower	

=== Mindanao ===
==== Zamboanga ====
Image	Name	Founded	Location	Condition	Type	Notes
	Real Fuerte de Nuestra Señora del Pilar de Zaragoza	1635	Zamboanga City, Zamboanga del Sur	restored	quadrilateral bastioned fortress	
	La Caldera	1800s	Zamboanga City, Zamboanga del Sur	demolished in 1967	fortress and naval station	
	San Ramon detachment	1898	Zamboanga City, Zamboanga del Sur	unknown	military detachment	status unconfirmed
	Fuerte de Alfonso XII	1890	Tukuran, Zamboanga del Sur	ruin	military detachment	
	Margosatubig detachment	1800s	Margosatubig, Zamboanga del Sur	unknown	military detachment	status unconfirmed
	Cotta de Dapitan	1761	Dapitan, Zamboanga del Norte	fortress foundations remain	fortress and wooden watchtower	
	Fuerza de Santa Maria	mid-1800s	Siocon, Zamboanga del Norte	no remains	fortress and naval station	
	Sindangan naval station	mid-1800s	Sindangan, Zamboanga del Norte	no remains	naval station	
	Dipolog watchtower	?	Dipolog, Zamboanga del Norte	no remains	watchtower	
	Fuerza de Jolo	1876	Jolo, Sulu	destroyed	citadel	
==== Northern Mindanao ====
Image	Name	Founded	Location	Condition	Type	Notes
	Fuerte de la Concepcion y del Triunfo	1756	Ozamiz, Misamis Occidental	restored	citadel	
	Oroquieta Church and watchtower	?	Oroquieta, Misamis Occidental	no remains	wooden fortress church and watchtower	
	Fuerza de Agustin de San Pedro OAR	1700s (?)	Cagayan de Oro, Misamis Oriental	no remains	stone fortress and fortress church	
	Initao watchtower	?	Initao, Misamis Oriental	no remains	watchtower	
	Hiponan watchtower	?	Opol (?), Misamis Oriental	no remains	watchtower	
	Laguindingan watchtower		Laguindingan, Misamis Oriental	ruin	watchtower	
	Guinsiliban watchtowers		Guinsiliban, Camiguin	no remains of wooden watchtower, stone watchtower intact (restored)	watchtowers	
	Fuerza de Almonte	1891	Bacolod, Lanao del Norte	ruin	fortress	
==== Caraga & Davao ====
Image	Name	Founded	Location	Condition	Type	Notes
	Butuan Fort and Church	1700s (?)	Butuan, Agusan del Norte	only ruined watchtower remains	fortress and fortress church	
	Fuerza de Agustin de San Pedro OAR	1680s	Bunawan, Agusan del Sur	no remains, inundated?	quadrilateral wooden palisade	
	Butuan detachment	1800s	Butuan, Agusan del Norte	no remains	military detachment	
	Fuerza de San Jose	1609	Tandag, Surigao del Sur	ruin	Crown fortress	Only foundations remain
	Paniquian watchtower	?	Surigao del Sur (?)	unknown	watchtower	site uncertain
	Surigao watchtower	?	Surigao del Norte	no remains	watchtower	
	Cateel Fort	?	Cateel, Davao del Norte	no remains	wooden palisade with earth embankments	
	Davao military detachment	?	Davao City, Davao del Sur	no remains	military detachment	
==== Soccsksargen ====
Image	Name	Founded	Location	Condition	Type	Notes
	Libungan detachment	1800s	Libungan, Cotabato	unknown	military detachment	status unconfirmed
	Glan detachment	1800s	Glan, Sarangani	unknown	military detachment	status unconfirmed
==== Bangsamoro ====
Image	Name	Founded	Location	Condition	Type	Notes
	Polloc Fort and Church	1800s	Parang, Maguindanao del Norte	unknown	stone fortress and fortress church	
	Parang Fort	?	Parang, Maguindanao del Norte	unknown	fortress	status unconfirmed
	Cotabato detachment	1800s	Cotabato, Maguindanao del Norte	unknown	military detachment	status unconfirmed
	Tamontaka detachment	1800s	Cotabato, Maguindanao del Norte	unknown	military detachment	status unconfirmed
	Tumbao detachment	1800s	Kabuntalan, Maguindanao del Norte	unknown	military detachment	status unconfirmed
	Fuerza de Pikit	1893	Malidegao, Cotabato	ruin	fortress	
	Fuerza de Regina Regente	1893	Malidegao, Cotabato	unknown	fortress	status unconfirmed

== UNESCO World Heritage status ==
=== Tentative list ===
On May 16, 2006, a collection of five well-preserved examples of Spanish Colonial architecture was added to the UNESCO World Heritage Tentative List in the Cultural category.

The collection titled "Spanish Colonial Fortifications of the Philippines" include the following buildings located throughout the country:

1. Fuerza de Capul, Northern Samar
2. Dauis Watchtower, Dauis, Bohol
3. Punta Cruz Watchtower, Maribojoc, Bohol
4. Fuerza de San Andres, Romblon, Romblon
5. Fuerza de Sta. Isabel, Taytay, Palawan

In 2015, by recommendation of UNESCO, the fortifications were removed from the tentative list of the Philippines as they 'will have a hard time meeting the standards of the organization'. The old town of Capul (Northern Samar), old town of Romblon (Romblon province), and old town of Taytay (Palawan) were recommended as possible heritage sites in the future once the Philippines submits them in the tentative list, along with a complete dossier.

=== Future reinclusion list ===
Heritage groups have been advocating for the return of the fortifications in the tentative list, but with the inclusion of at least twenty-one more Spanish colonial fortifications throughout the country to maximize its potential to be included in the World Heritage List. Restoration activities on numerous fortifications throughout the country are currently ongoing in a bid to support the future nomination of the fortifications to UNESCO. However, some fortifications are within private lands, hindering cultural agencies of government from restoring those forts. The possible return of the fortifications in the tentative list is supported by both governments of the Philippines and Spain. Other proposed properties are:

1. Intramuros, Manila
2. Cuartel de Santo Domingo, Santa Rosa, Laguna
3. Fuerza de Cuyo, Cuyo, Palawan
4. Fuerza de Cagayancillo, Cagayancillo, Palawan
5. Real Fuerza de Nuestra Señora del Pilar de Zaragoza, Zamboanga City
6. Fuerza de San Felipe, Cavite City
7. Fuerza de San Pedro, Cebu
8. Fuerte de la Concepcion y del Triunfo, Ozamiz, Misamis Occidental
9. Fuerza de San Antonio Abad, Manila
10. Fuerza de Pikit, Malidegao, Cotabato
11. Fuerza de Santiago, Romblon, Romblon
12. Fuerza de Jolo, Jolo, Sulu
13. Fuerza de Masbate, Masbate
14. Fuerza de Bongabong, Bongabong, Oriental Mindoro
15. Cotta de Dapitan, Dapitan, Zamboanga del Norte
16. Fuerte de Alfonso XII, Tukuran, Zamboanga del Sur
17. Fuerza de Bacolod, Bacolod, Lanao del Norte
18. Guinsiliban Watchtower, Guinsiliban, Camiguin
19. Laguindingan Watchtower, Laguindingan, Misamis Oriental
20. Kutang San Diego, Gumaca, Quezon
21. Baluarte Luna, Luna, La Union

== See also ==
Architecture of the Philippines

- List of ruined churches in the Philippines

History of the Philippines (1565–1898)

- Spanish–Moro conflict
- Piracy in the Sulu and Celebes Seas
- Military history of the Philippines

Fortification

- List of forts
