= List of ruined churches in the Philippines =

The Philippines possesses dozens of ruined church sites dating to the Spanish colonial period.

== List ==
Image	Name	Location	Order	Structural type	Ref.
	Bacarra	Bacarra, Ilocos Norte	Augustinian	belfry	
	Bancuro	Naujan, Oriental Mindoro	Augustinian	church	
	Bangahon Church Ruins	Gandara, Samar		church	
	Banza	Butuan, Caraga		belfry	
	Binongtoan	Carigara, Leyte		church	
	Budiao	Daraga, Albay		church	
	Cagsawa	Daraga, Albay	Franciscan	belfry	
	Dulag	Dulag, Leyte		church	
	Dumaguete belfry	Dumaguete, Negros Oriental		belfry	
	Ermita	Dimiao, Bohol		church	
	Ermita	Dumangas, Iloilo		church	
	Gui-ob	Catarman, Camiguin		church	
	Igbaras	Igbaras, Iloilo		church	
	Kuta	Bongabong, Occidental Mindoro		church	
	Mangarin	San Jose, Occidental Mindoro		church	
	Mataguisi	Pudtol, Apayao		church	
	Maybato	Hamtic, Antique		church	
	Nahulugang Kampana	Lagonoy, Camarines Sur		belfry	
	Nassiping	Gattaran, Cagayan		church	
	Nuestra Señora de la Escalera	Nasugbu, Batangas		church	
	Old Taal	San Nicolas, Batangas		church	
	Old Tanauan	Talisay, Batangas		church	
	Palapag	Palapag, Northern Samar		church	
	Pasuquin	Pasuquin, Ilocos Norte		church	
	Pata	Sanchez-Mira, Cagayan	Dominican	church	
	Pinagbayanan	Paluan, Occidental Mindoro		church	
	Pinagbayanan	San Juan, Batangas		church	
	Pindangan	San Fernando, La Union		church	
	Saint Augustine	Panglao, Bohol		church	
	Saint Hyacinth	San Jacinto, Pangasinan		church	
	San Agustin de Hippo	Bantay, Ilocos Sur		church	
	San Diego	Silay, Negros Occidental		church	
	San Francisco de Asis	Tarangnan, Northern Samar		church	
	San Francisco de Assisi	Escalante, Negros Occidental		church	
	San Guillermo de Aquitania	Magsingal, Ilocos Sur		church	
	San Jacinto de Polonia	Camalaniugan, Cagayan		church	
	San Juan de Dios Church	Cavite City	Hospitallers of Saint John of God	church	
	San Julian de Cuenca	Janiuay, Iloilo		belfry	
	San Pablo de Cabagan	Isabela		church	
	San Pedro	San Jose, Antique	Augustinian	church	
	Santa Barbara	Zumarraga, Samar		church	
	Santa Maria	Lal-lo, Cagayan		church	
	Santa Monica Church belfry	Cavite City	Augustinian Recollects	belfry	
	Santa Rosa de Lima	Bacacay, Albay		church	
	Seven Dolors	Hernani, Eastern Samar		church	
	Siaton	Siaton, Negros Occidental		church	
	Sinimbahanan	Tiwi, Albay		church	
	Tabang	Santo Niño, Cagayan		church	
	Tumbaga	Sariaya, Quezon		church	
	Tucalana	Lal-lo, Cagayan de Oro		church	
	Old Oton Church	Oton, Iloilo	Augustinian	church	

== See also ==
- Architecture of the Philippines
  - Baroque Churches of the Philippines
  - Spanish colonial fortifications in the Philippines
- Church architecture
- Indigenous Philippine shrines and sacred grounds
- History of the Philippines (1565–1898)
  - Catholic Church in the Philippines
