= Punta Cruz Watchtower =

Historic watchtower in Bohol, Philippines

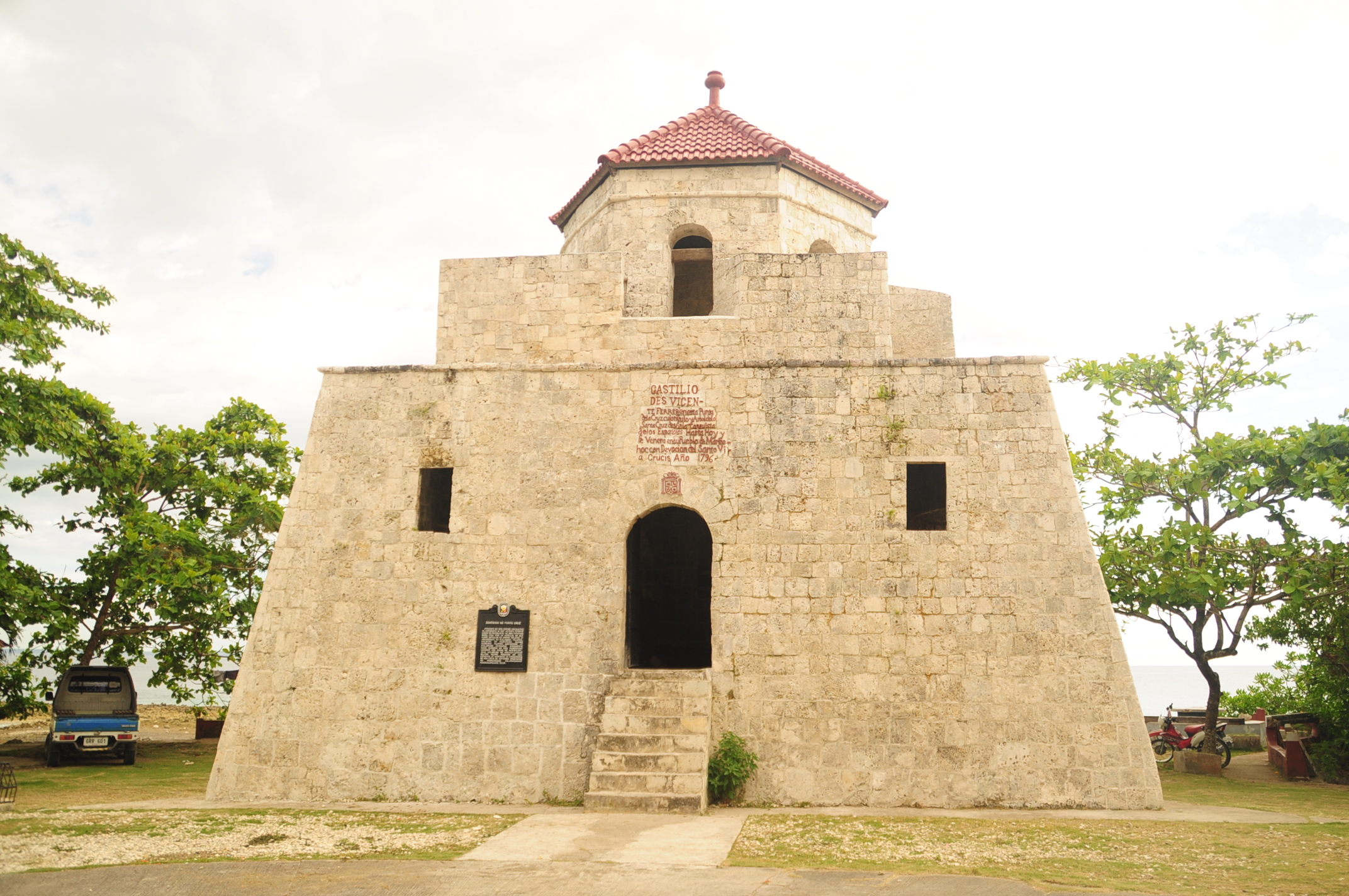
- Restored Punta Cruz Watchtower following the 2013 Bohol earthquake
- Interactive map of the Punta Cruz Watchtower area
- Alternative names: Fuerte de San Vicente Ferrer; Maribojoc Watchtower

General information
- Status: National Cultural Treasure
- Type: Watchtower
- Location: Maribojoc, Bohol, Philippines
- Coordinates: 9°44′06″N 123°47′24″E
- Completed: 1796
- Owner: Municipality of Maribojoc

Technical details
- Material: Stones and wood

Website
- Punta Cruz Historical Watchtower

The Fort of Saint Vincent Ferrer (Spanish: Fuerte de San Vicente Ferrer) or commonly known as Punta Cruz Watchtower (Tagalog: Bantayan ng Punta Cruz) is a Spanish colonial era watchtower located at the western tip of the municipality of Maribojoc, Bohol, Philippines. Also known as Maribojoc Watchtower because of its geographical location, it is located three kilometers (1.9 mi) away from Maribojoc Church. It is known for being the "only perfect isosceles triangle" tower-fort structure in the Philippines.

The watchtower experienced moderate to serious damage based on a technical assessment done by the National Commission for Culture and the Arts after the 2013 Bohol earthquake.

== Description ==
Oriented northeast, the watchtower was used as a defense system against Moro pirates from the south. It was built under Augustinian Recollect priest Father Manuel Sanchez de Nuestra Sra. del Tremendal and was finished in 1796. Made of cut coral stones, its base is shaped as a perfect isosceles triangle connected to a short hexagonal tower on the second level. The tower is known for being the "only perfect isosceles triangle" tower-fort structure in the Philippines. It has several levels (or floors). Its central room contains a niche for religious image, in particular of Saint Vincent Ferrer. Wooden beams that support masonry walls are still present inside.

The Spanish coat-of-arms and an inscription highlighted by reddish earth tint can be seen at the tower's entrance.

== Dedication ==
The tower is dedicated to the secondary patron of Maribojoc, San Vicente Ferrer, as shown on the inscriptions on the tower entrance and an image of the saint inside.

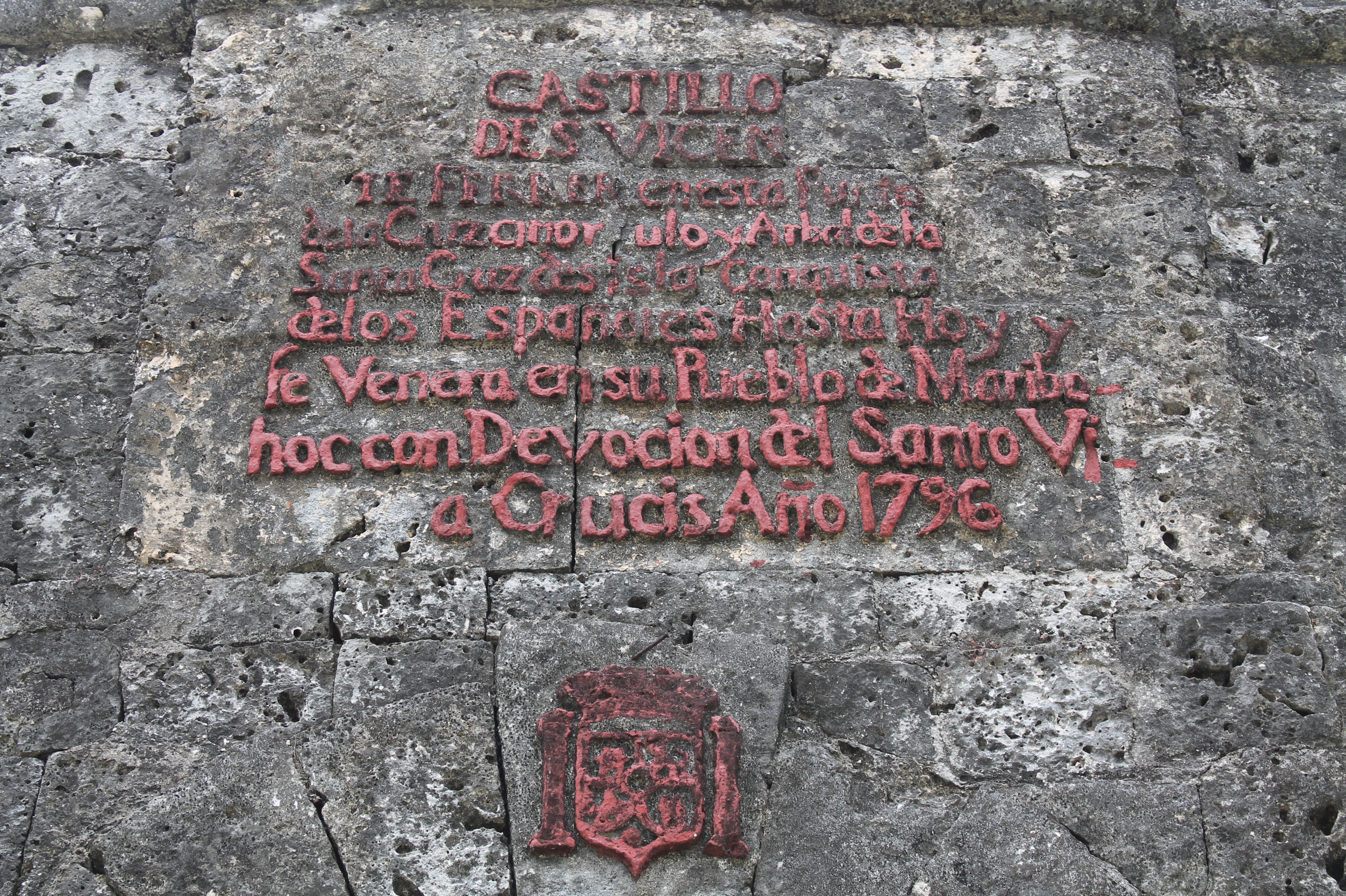
| Castillo de S. Vicente Ferrer en esta Punta de la Cruz [...?] y Árbol de la Santa Cruz desde la conquista de los Españoles Hasta Hoy y fe Venera en su Pueblo de Maribohoc con Devoción del Santo Via Crucis Año 1796 Castillo de San Vicente Ferrer in this Punta de la Cruz, whose title and tree of the Holy Cross have been venerated since the time of the Spanish Conquest until today in his town of Maribohoc, with devotions to the Stations of the Holy Cross, year 1796. |

Adjacent to the watchtower is a wooden cross in a rock clip facing the sea. The people of Maribojoc, being under the patronage of the Holy Cross, believe that they are protected by the Holy Cross from Moro pirates.

== Historical and cultural declarations ==
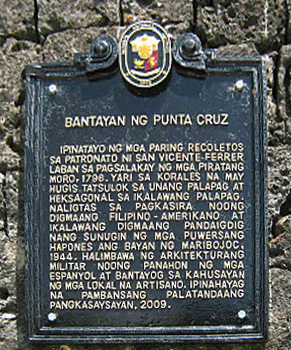
Watchtower NHI historical marker

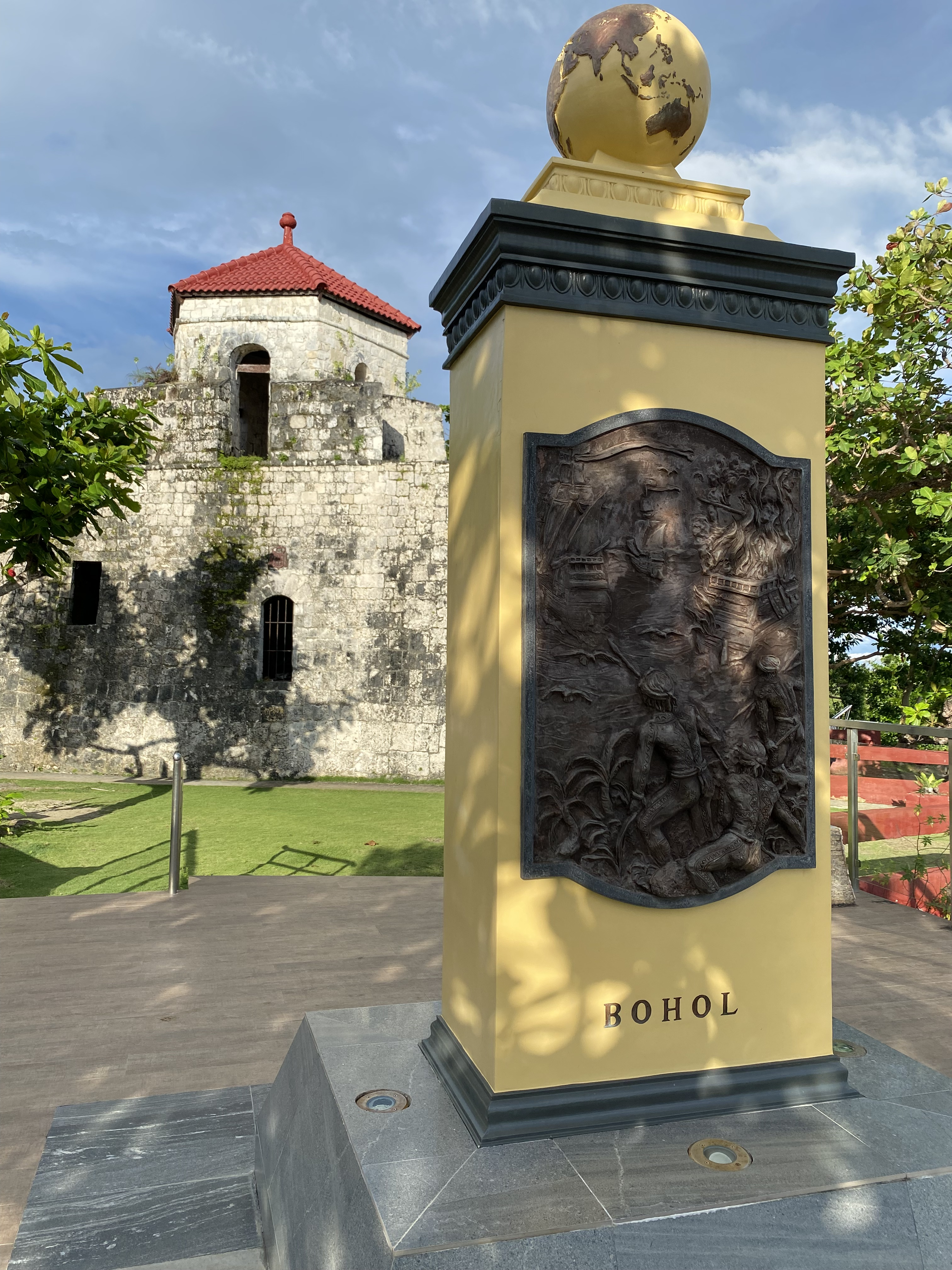
Philippine Quincentennial historical marker located beside the fort

The Punta Cruz Watchtower was declared as a National Historical Landmark in February 2009. Its historical marker was unveiled by the municipality of Maribojoc and the National Historical Institute (now National Historical Commission of the Philippines) in May 2009. It was also declared by the National Museum of the Philippines as a National Cultural Treasure under the collective group of Bohol Watchtowers together with the watchtowers of Dauis, Panglao, Pamilacan, Loay and Balilihan on August 29, 2011 and official marker unveiling in July 2012.

Together with Fuerza de Capul in Northern Samar, Dauis watchtower in Bohol, Fuerza de San Andres in Romblon and Fuerza de Sta. Isabel in Taytay, Palawan, the Punta Cruz Watchtower is being considered to the UNESCO World Heritage Tentative List since 2006 under the collective group of Spanish Colonial Fortifications of the Philippines.

== 2013 Bohol earthquake ==
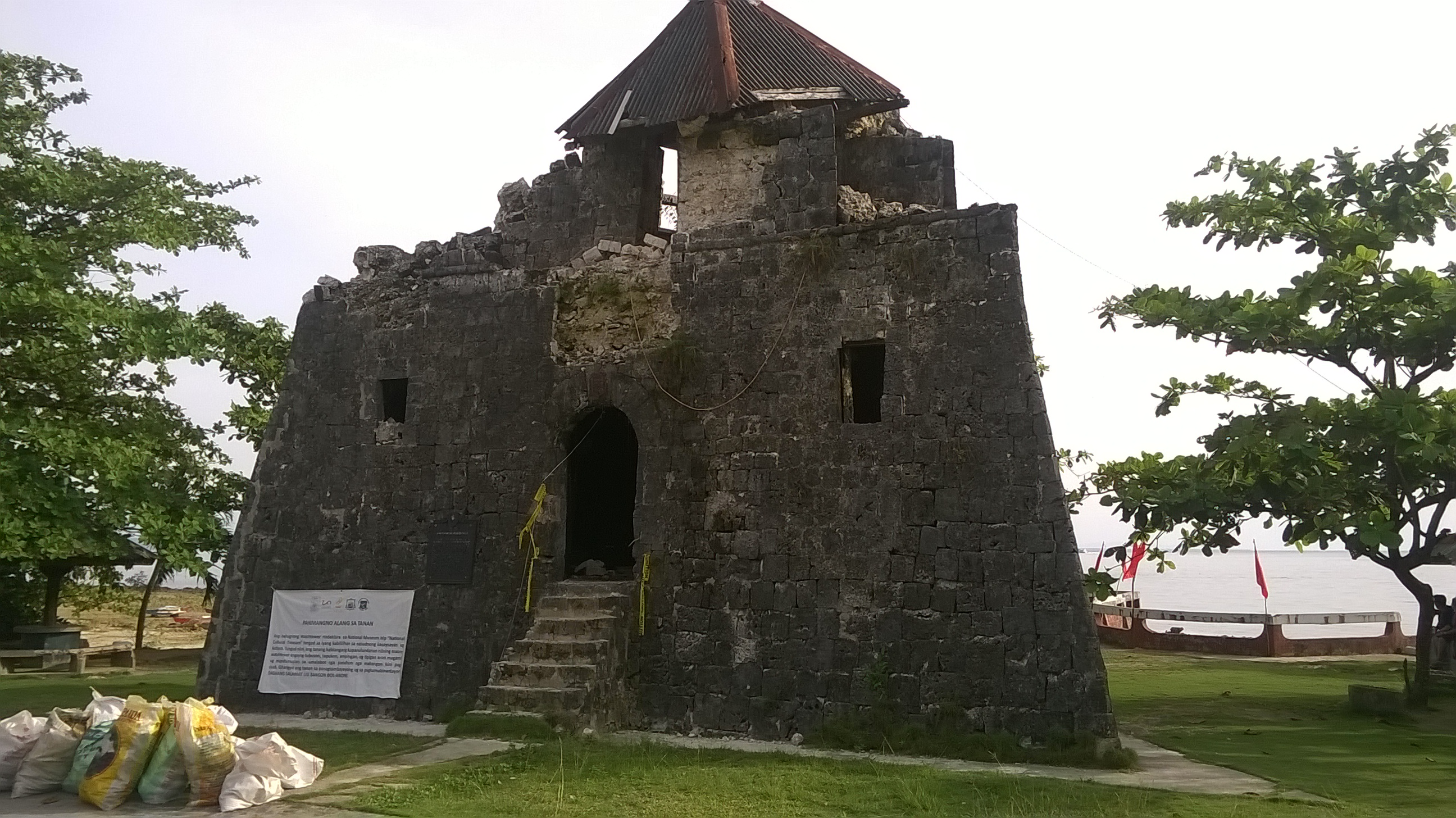
Punta Cruz Watchtower after the 2013 Bohol earthquake

One of the largest earthquakes to hit Bohol struck the island at 8:12 AM on October 15, 2013. The center of the M7.2 earthquake was near Sagbayan, Bohol. Based on the technical assessment conducted by the National Commission for Culture and the Arts after the 2013 Bohol earthquake, the watchtower experienced moderate to serious damage. It has since been restored since 2016.

== See also ==
- Maribojoc Church

== Bibliography ==
- Jose, Regalado Trota (2001). Visita Iglesia Bohol: A Guide to Historic Churches. Manila: National Commission for Culture and the Arts. pp. 81–86. ISBN 971-814-016-6.
