= Maribojoc Church =

Roman Catholic church in Bohol, Philippines

- Santa Cruz Parish Church
- Diocesan Shrine of San Vicente Ferrer; Holy Cross Parish Church
- Iglesia Parroquial de La Santa Cruz y Santuario Diocesano de San Vicente Ferrer (Spanish)
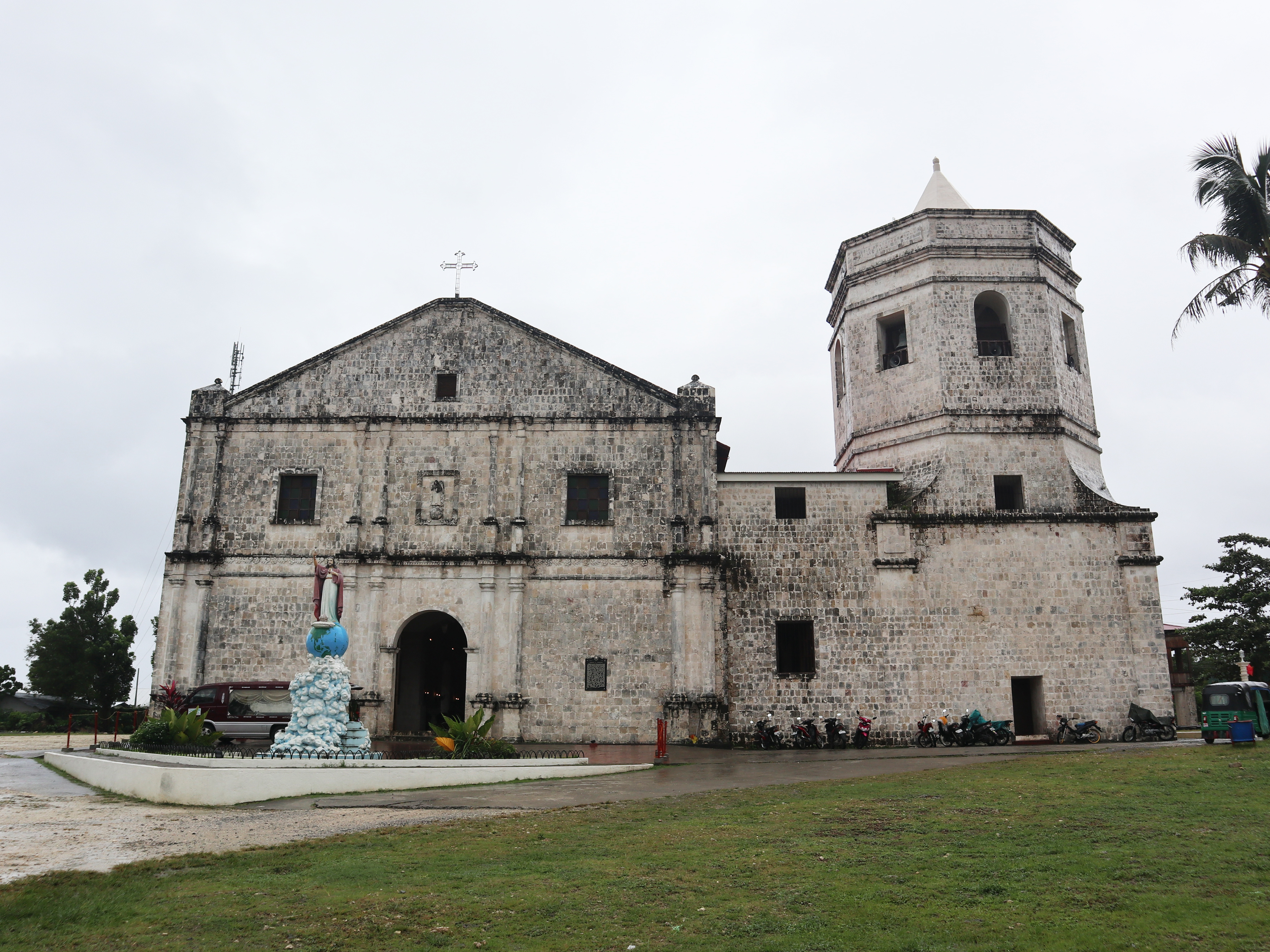
- The church in January 2023

- Location in the Visayas Location in the Philippines
- 9°44′25″N 123°50′36″E
- Location: Poblacion, Maribojoc, Bohol
- Country: Philippines
- Denomination: Roman Catholic

History
- Status: Diocesan Shrine and parish church
- Founded: 1767 or 1768
- Founder(s): Fr. Juan Soriano, SJ
- Dedication: Vicente Ferrer
- Other dedication: Holy Cross
- Consecrated: 1872

Architecture
- Heritage designation: National Cultural Treasure
- Designated: May 5, 2010
- Architectural type: Church building
- Style: Baroque
- Years built: 1852–1872 (dst. 2013); c. late 2010s–2021
- Completed: December 12, 2021

Specifications
- Materials: Coral stones

Administration
- Province: Cebu
- Diocese: Tagbilaran
- Deanery: Our Lady of Light
- Parish: Santa Cruz/Holy Cross

Clergy
- Priest: Fr. Efren D. Dolauta

Santa Cruz Parish Church, also known as Holy Cross Parish Church and Maribojoc Church, is a Roman Catholic parish church in the municipality of Maribojoc, Bohol, Philippines, under the Diocese of Tagbilaran. The parish was first established by the Jesuits in 1767 or 1768 with Father Juan Soriano, SJ as its first parish priest. The Augustinian Recollects later administered the community until 1898.

The church was built in 1852 under Father Manuel Plaza and completed in 1872. In 2005, it was designated by the diocese as the Diocesan Shrine of San Vicente Ferrer. It was also declared a National Cultural Treasure by the National Museum of the Philippines and a National Historical Landmark by the National Historical Commission of the Philippines.

When a 7.2 magnitude earthquake struck Bohol and other parts of Central Visayas in 2013, the entire building crumbled to the ground, leaving only the image of the Sacred Heart of Jesus standing. It was reopened in 2021.

== Location ==
Just like the other towns of Bohol, the church and convent of Maribojoc were located on the "uptown", a portion of the town that is usually elevated compared to the rest of the town, called "downtown". The back of the church faced downtown and the sea. The uptown and downtown portions of Maribojoc were connected by a stone stairway finished in 1842. Instead of a plaza in front of the church, a ravine and the plaza were located on either side.

== Church history ==
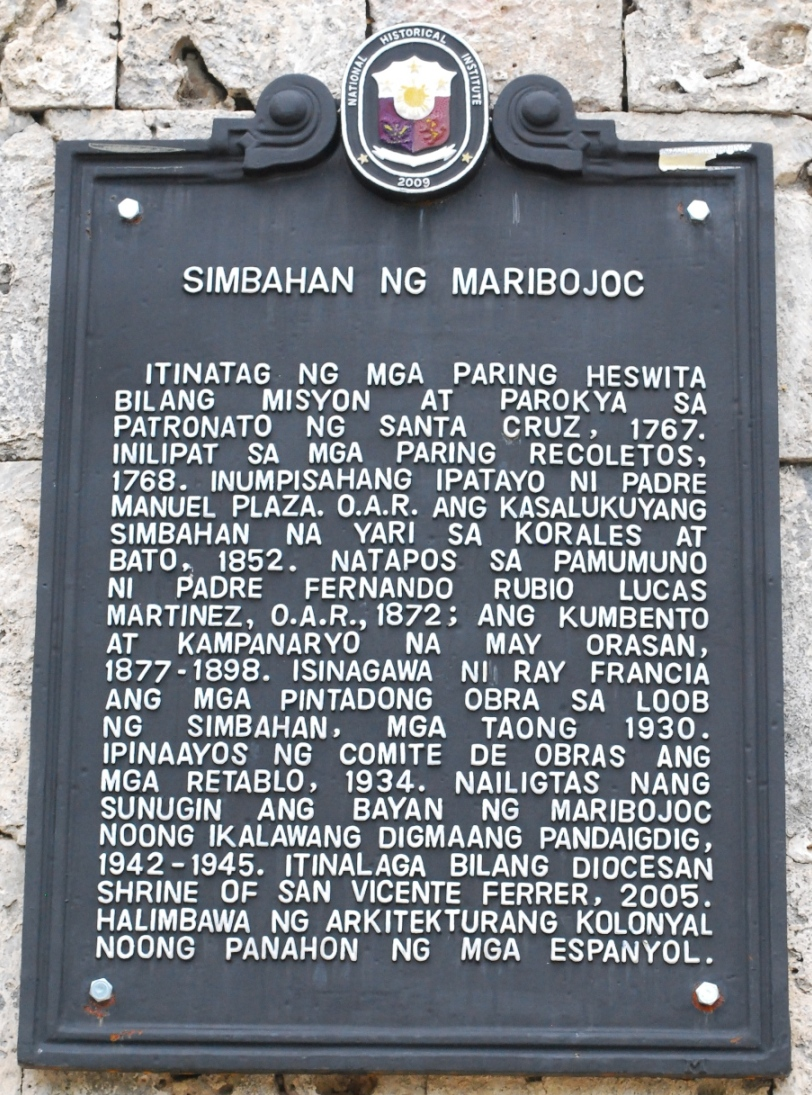
Church NHI historical marker installed in 2009

The Jesuits started evangelizing the town of Maribojoc (originally Malabojoc) as a mission station in the early 1600s. It was built in the settlement along the Abatan River at Viga, now part of Antequera, including a church built by Father Gabriel Sánchez. The parish was founded in 1767 or 1768. With the canonical erection of the Holy Cross Parish, Father Juan Soriano, SJ, was installed as its first parish priest.

When the Jesuits left Maribojoc in 1768, the Augustinian Recollects administered to the spiritual needs of the town until 1898. Father Julian de Santa Ana, from the Recollects, served as the second parish priest. In 1794 and 1880, the towns of Cortes and Antequera established their own parish, separate from Maribojoc. The first church was constructed in a muddy area of the town proper from 1798 and was finished after 18 years under forced labor (polos y servicios) in 1816. To build the church, parishioners were instructed to bring not less than 4 pounds of rock from the sea every time they attended.

The church, made of coral stones under the Recollects, was built in 1852 under the auspices of Father Manuel Plaza, who served as parish priest from 1843 to 1859, then continued under Father Fernando Rubio. After twenty years, the church was finished in 1872. Father José Sánchez also built part of Maribojoc church and its Neo-Gothic retablo. The church was spared during the Philippine–American War, the Second World War and natural calamities. In 2009, the National Historical Institute (NHI), now National Historical Commission of the Philippines, installed a historical marker in the presence of Tagbilaran Bishop Most Reverend Leonardo Medroso and Ambeth Ocampo, chairman of NHI. The church was declared a National Cultural Treasure on May 5, 2010. Its marker was unveiled on July 22, 2012, at the Old Provincial Building of Bohol in Tagbilaran. Although the church survived previous natural calamities and wars, it did not survive the 2013 Bohol earthquake.

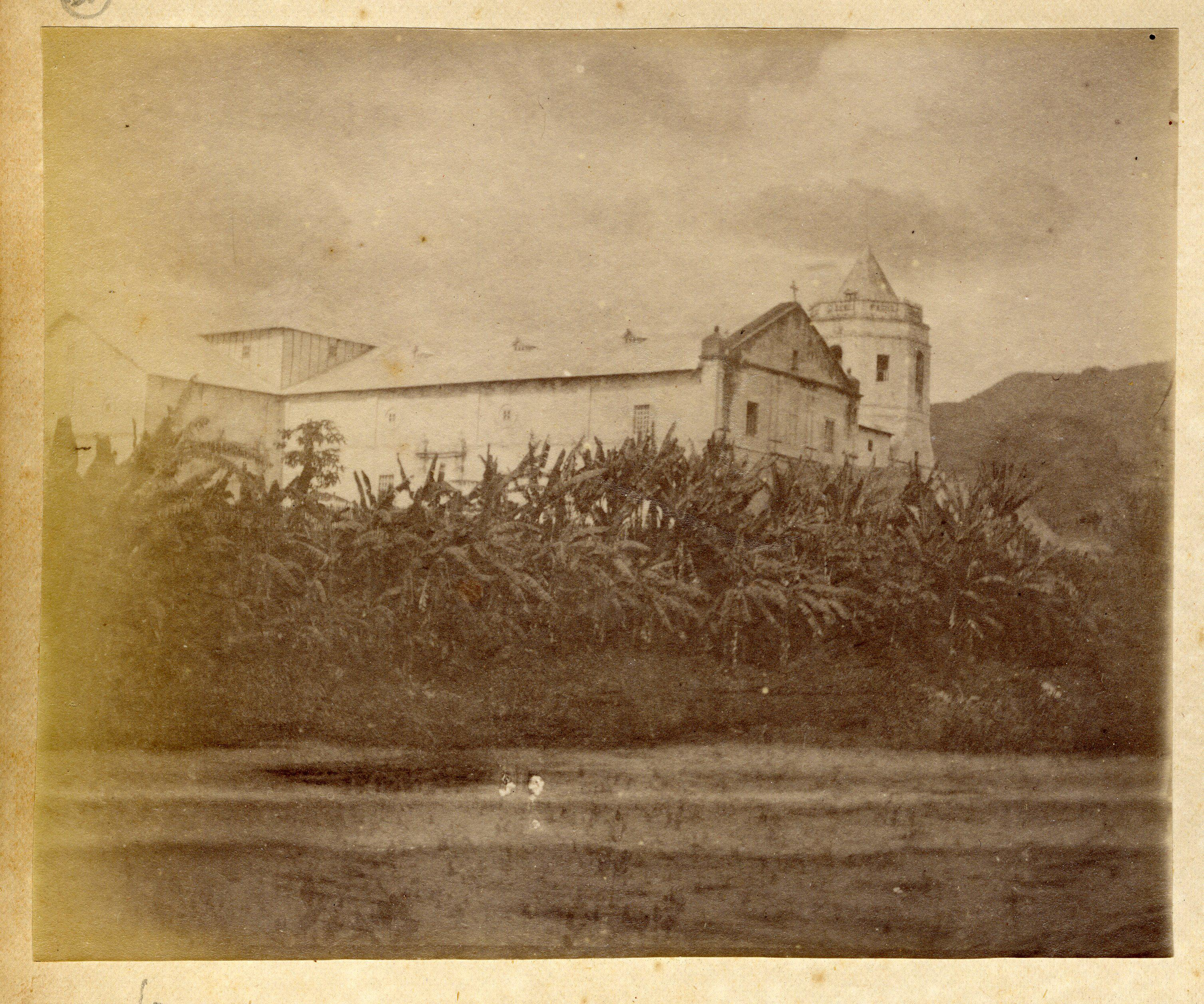
Maribojoc church, undated (possibly early 20th century)

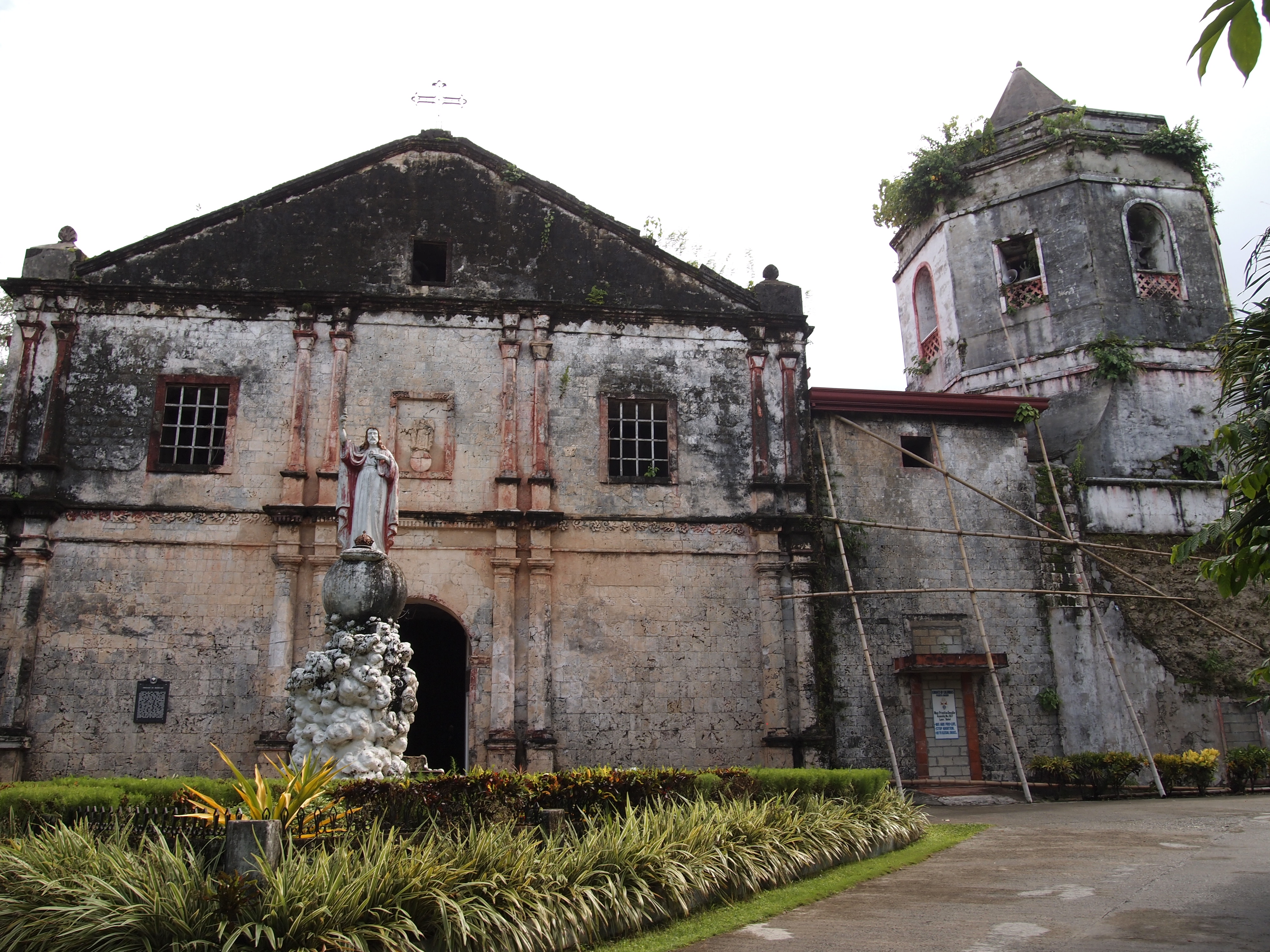
Church facade prior to the 2013 earthquake

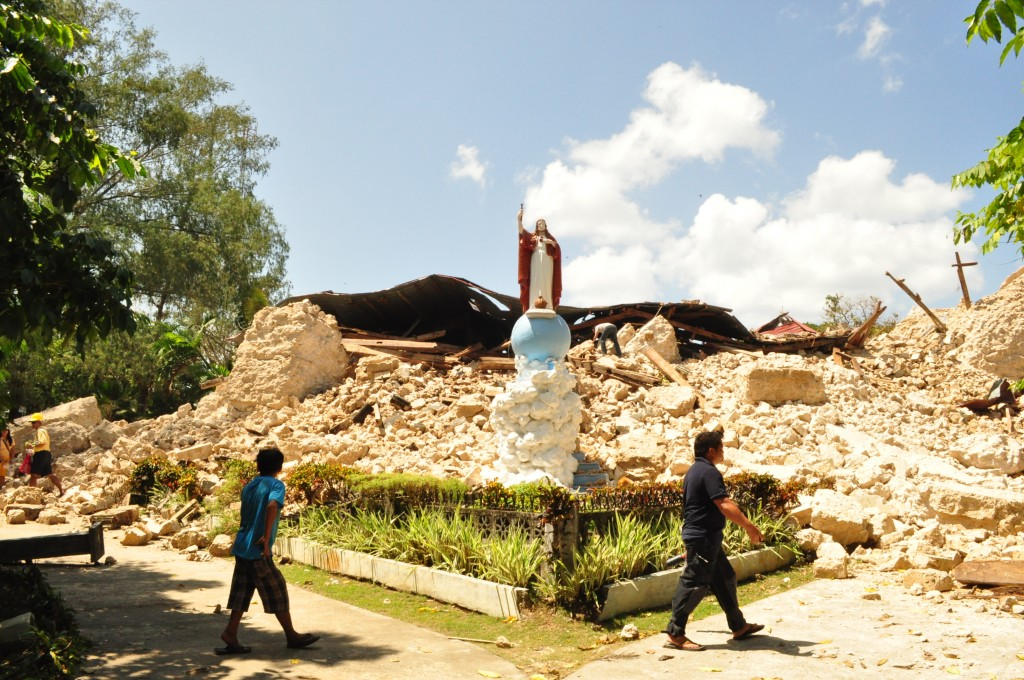
Church rubble following the 2013 earthquake

=== 2013 earthquake and restoration ===
On October 15, 2013, a strong earthquake heavily damaged the church and several other churches designated as National Cultural Treasures. Major damage was observed at the churches of Maribojoc and Loon. Both churches were left in rubble, having been totally destroyed. At Maribojoc Church only the image of the Sacred Heart of Jesus that remained standing in front of the church.

The Diocese of Tagbilaran restored Maribojoc Church and all other churches destroyed by the earthquake. The church's edifice and the paintings in the ceiling were restored. The church reopened on December 12, 2021, Gaudete Sunday.

== Architecture ==
The church of Maribojoc resembled a cross or cruciform with a low, four-sided pyramidical roof and octagonal cupola. Walls were consistently divided into thick and thin portions designed with finely cut coral stones on the sides.

=== Façade ===
Its façade was simply decorated by narrow pilasters and niches of saints. A bas relief of the church's secondary patron, San Vicente Ferrer, was prominently located on the center of the facade. A string of finely cut coral stones, molded into flowers, could be seen on the lower cornice of the facade. Beside the façade was an extension of a bulky belfry.

=== Bell tower ===
The bell tower of Maribojoc had seven bells and two windows with clock faces. One of the clocks, installed on October 15, 1893, during the term of Father Lucas Martínez, had an inscription of "José Altonaga", indicating that it came from a well-known company in Manila during the late 19th century. On that same day, lightning rods costing ₱ 900 were installed. It also had a separate entrance on the ground floor, possibly for easy access during changing shifts of watchmen. The largest of its seven bells was dedicated to San Vicente in the 1870s. When Father Pedro Quiterio was assigned to Maribojoc, he ordered the repair of the clock in the bell tower in December 1933.

=== Interior ===
The interior exhibited a contrast of bare nave walls against the paintings drawn on the metal ceilings leading to the main altar and retablo mayor. The ceiling paintings were known to be works of Raymundo Francia, as shown by his signature on one corner of the dome in the 1930s. An acknowledgment on the initiative of the San Tarcisio Martir Maribojoc Catholic Association 'Comité de Obras' could also be seen painted before the crossing. Several paintings by Francia on metal had deteriorated even before the total destruction of the church by earthquake in 2013. The Francia paintings were never touched up nor repainted. The new church dome (or cimborrio) was constructed in June 1889. Ray Francia was again commissioned to do mural works on the cimborrio by painting the Epistles of The Four Apostles, namely the saints John, Matthew, Luke and Mark.

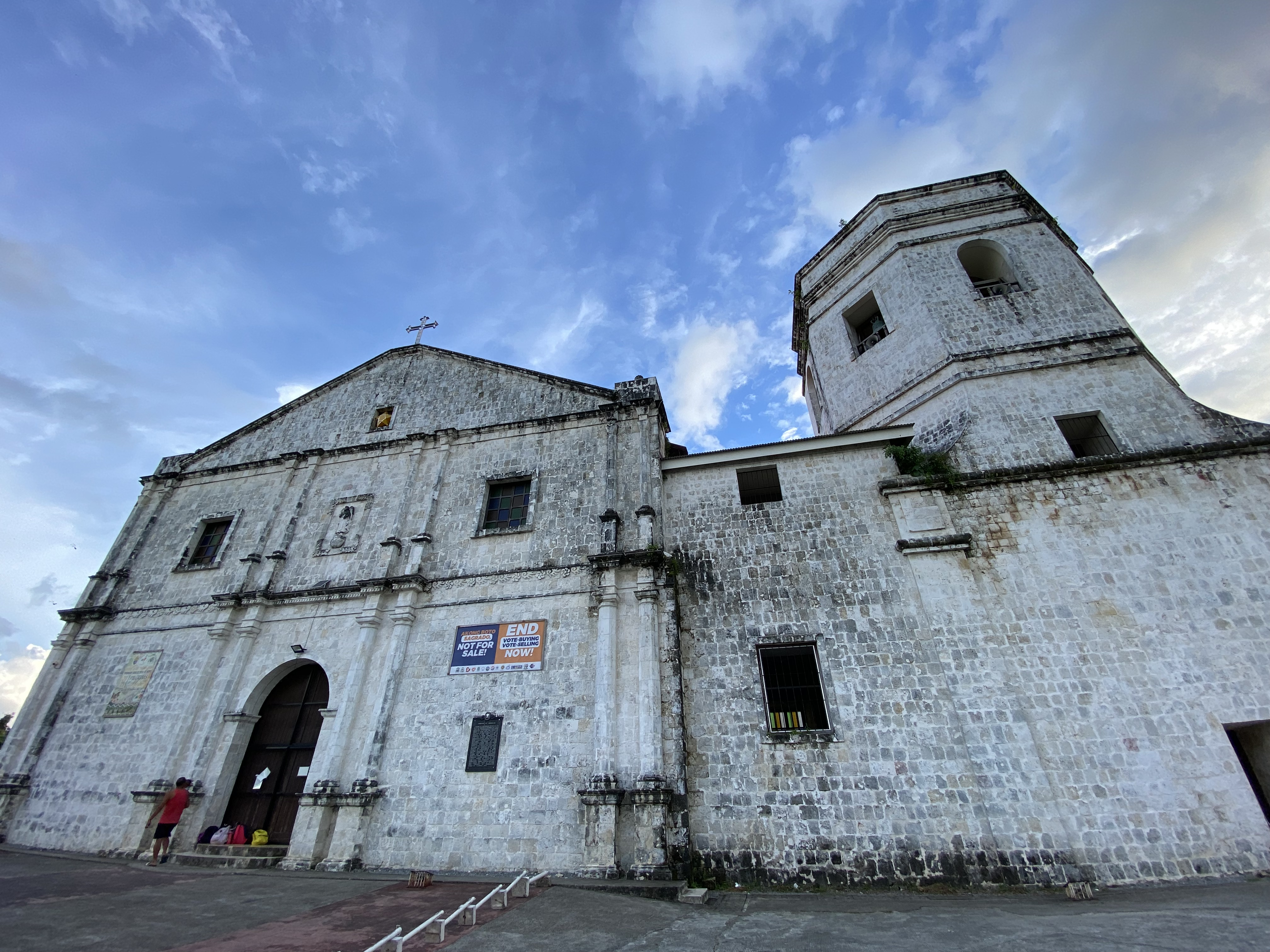
Church façade in 2025

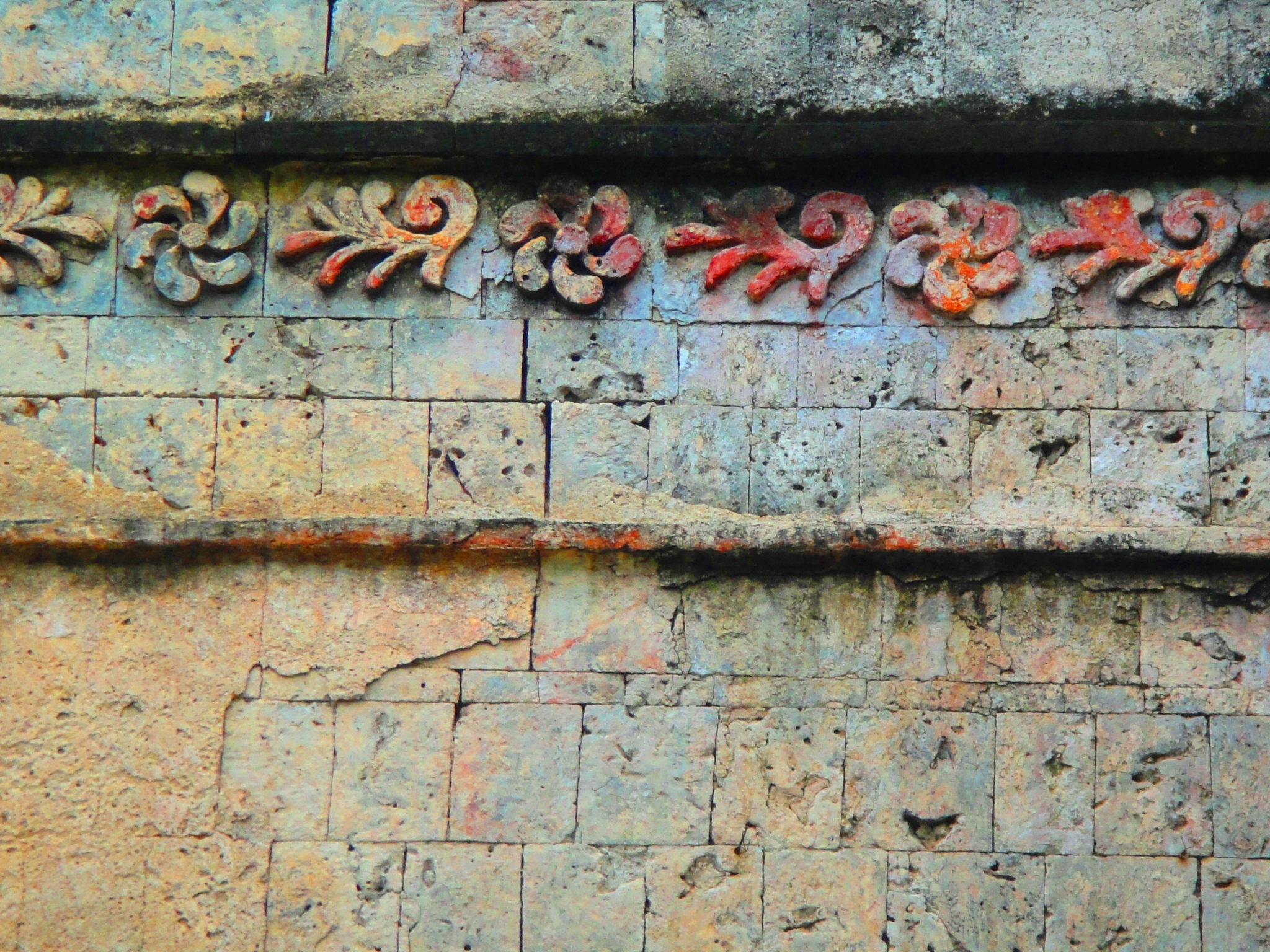
Coral stone walls

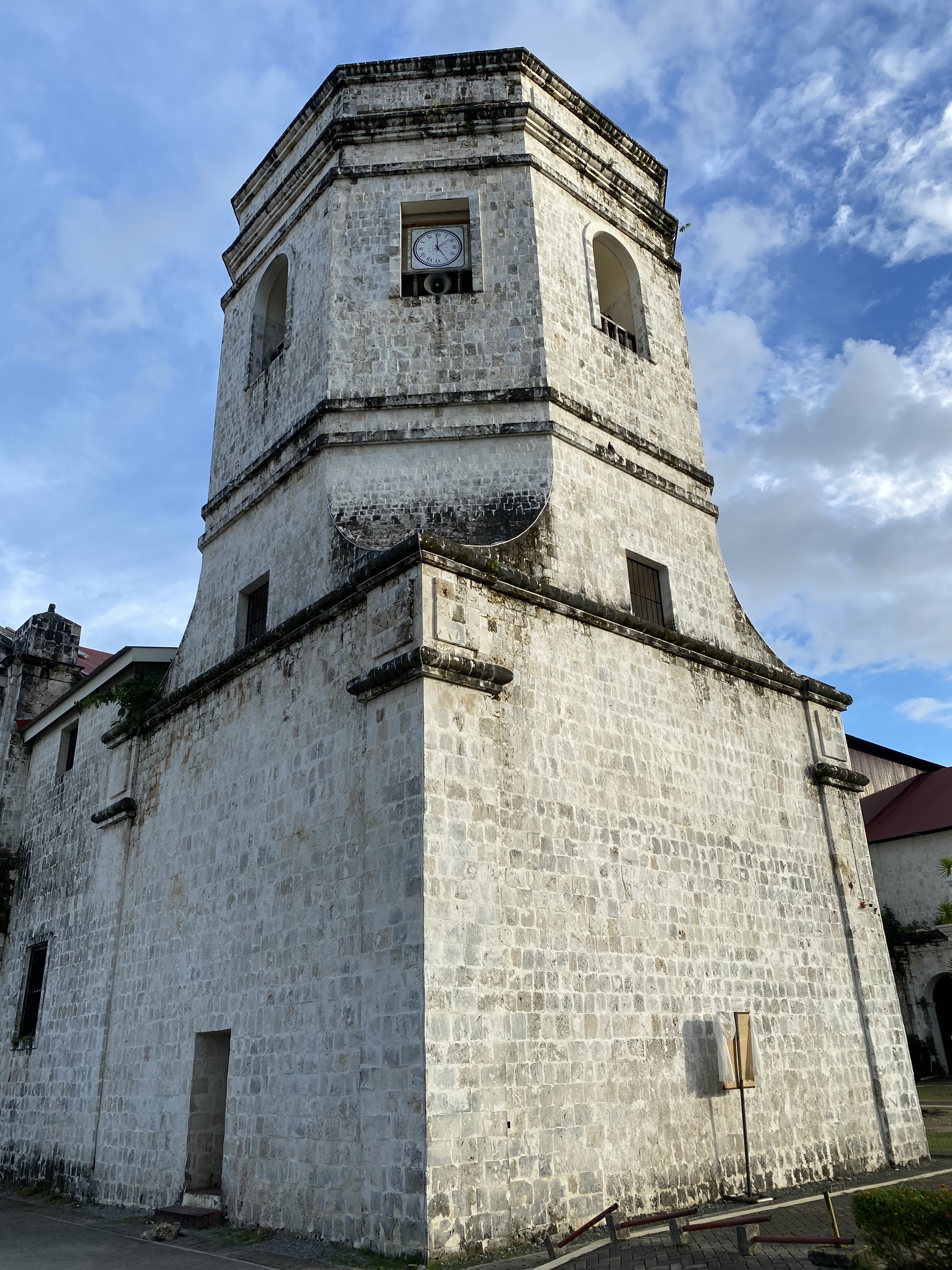
Bell tower

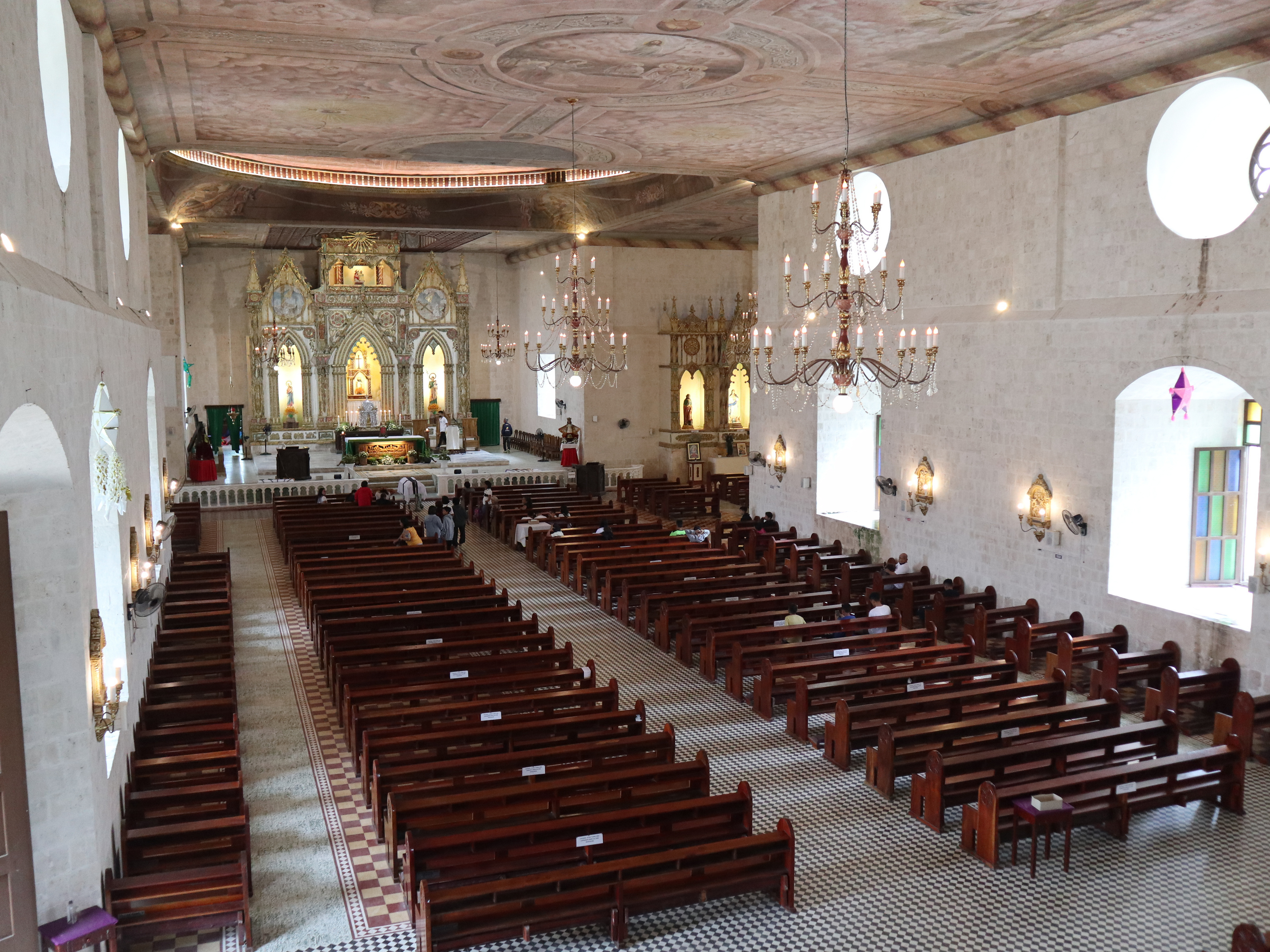
Church interior in 2023

=== Retablo ===
Maribojoc had five intricately carved Neo-Gothic retablos in the sanctuary and transepts. Striking features of the retablo were the presence of arches, crockets, Mudéjar stars and the profusion of carving. The whole retablo was probably completed on January 7, 1934, as a project of the Comité de Obras during the term of Father Quiterio Sarigumba (P.Q.S.) as seen on the inscription in the upper reaches of the central retablo. An older retablo, built from 1616 to 1692, predated the church.

The image of Santa Cruz, the town's patron, was located in a small shrine on top of another containing the wooden statue of San Vicente Ferrer, the town's secondary patron, on the central niche of the retablo-mayor. Above the central niche was the image of the Holy Trinity. On both sides, above the two other niches on the main altar, were paintings of the allegories of the Finding and Veneration of the True Cross. The rest of the retablos in the transept contained images of saints.

=== Choir loft ===
Connected to the choir loft was a small area where a large organ with metal pipes could be seen. The organ, which still needed restoration at the time of the earthquake, was last played in 1975. Estimated to have been built by Spanish pipe organ makers between the 17th and 19th centuries, the Maribojoc organ was one of the remaining 14 Spanish era pipe organs, three of which were in Bohol. Also located in the choir loft was a lectern for choral books. On the ceiling, a mural of the sacrament of baptism depicted Father Quiterio Sarigumba as the officiating priest. Father Sarigumba, also known as the "builder priest", was known for having repaired portions of Jagna Church and the addition of new facades to the churches of Inabanga and Panglao. A passage to the belfry was located in the choir loft.

=== Sacristy and convent ===
The sacristy was located behind the sanctuary. Another passageway lead from the sanctuary to the church convent. Unlike other churches, the convent of Maribojoc, built under the second term of Father Fernando Rubio, was attached to the back of the church and parallel to the epistle transept, forming a continuous "I" pattern instead of the usual "L" pattern. The convent was a traditional bahay-na-bato, with its ground floor made of stone and the second floor made of contemporary materials. Parts of the convent were used as the St. Vincent Institute, a school and the church museum, which housed liturgical objects, old canonical books (Bautizos, Defuociones, Casamientos, Actas), relics of St. Vincent Ferrer and another relic of the Holy Cross brought by Father Soriano, SJ from Jerusalem. Another stone stairway at the back of the convent, finished in 1864, connected the downtown to the port and led to an octagonal tower.

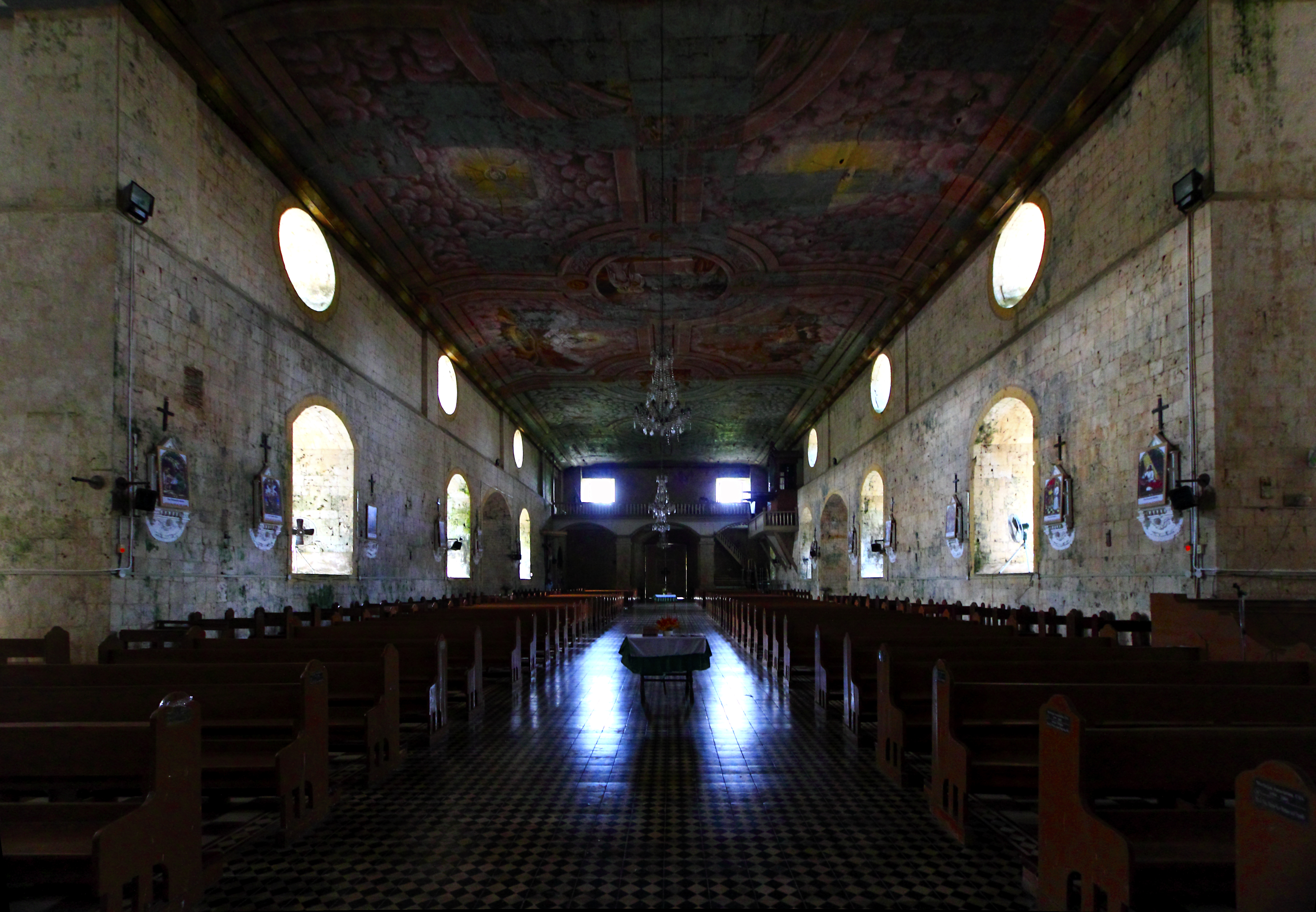
Church nave

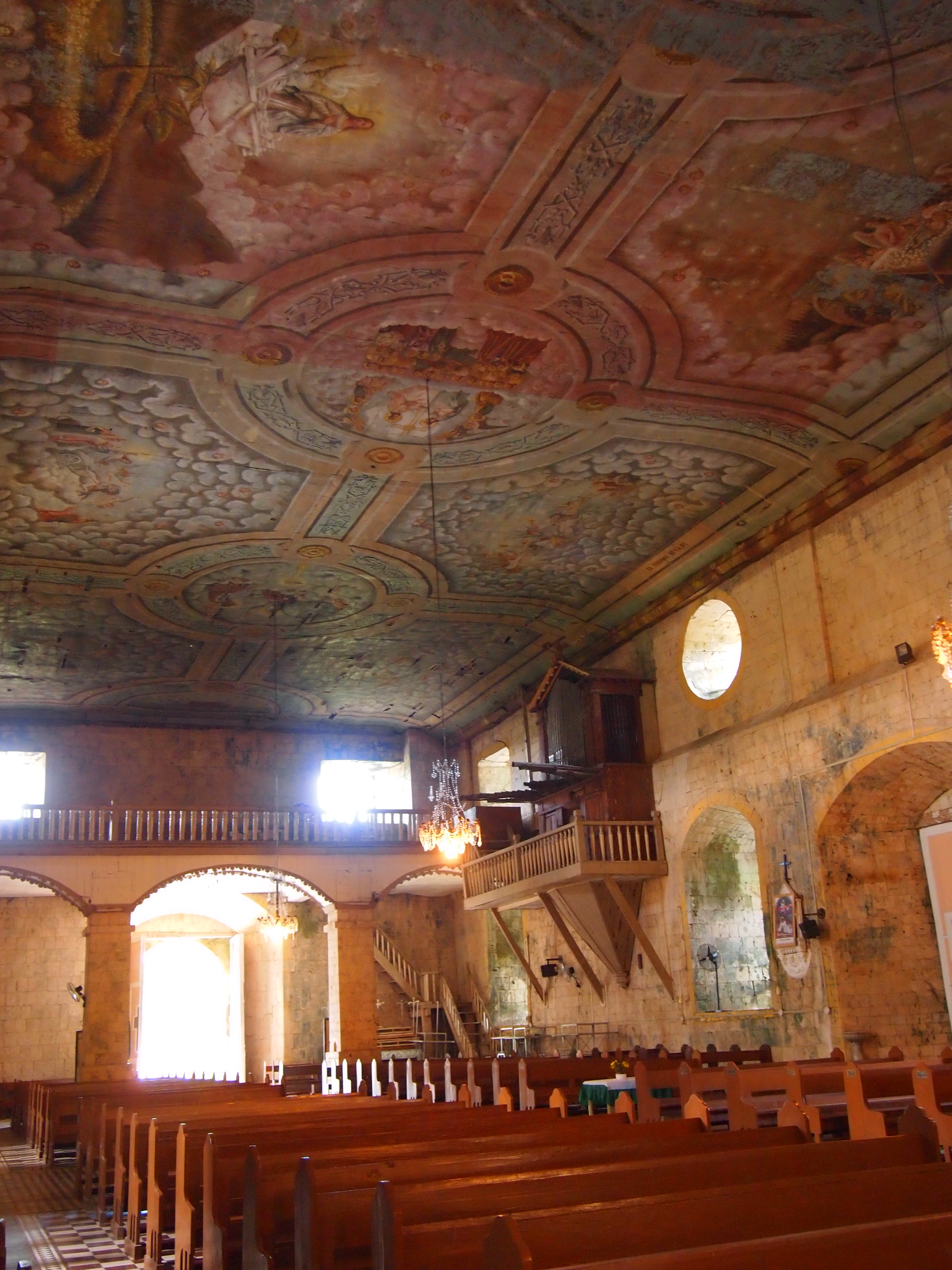
Ceiling paintings on Maribojoc Church by Raymundo Francia

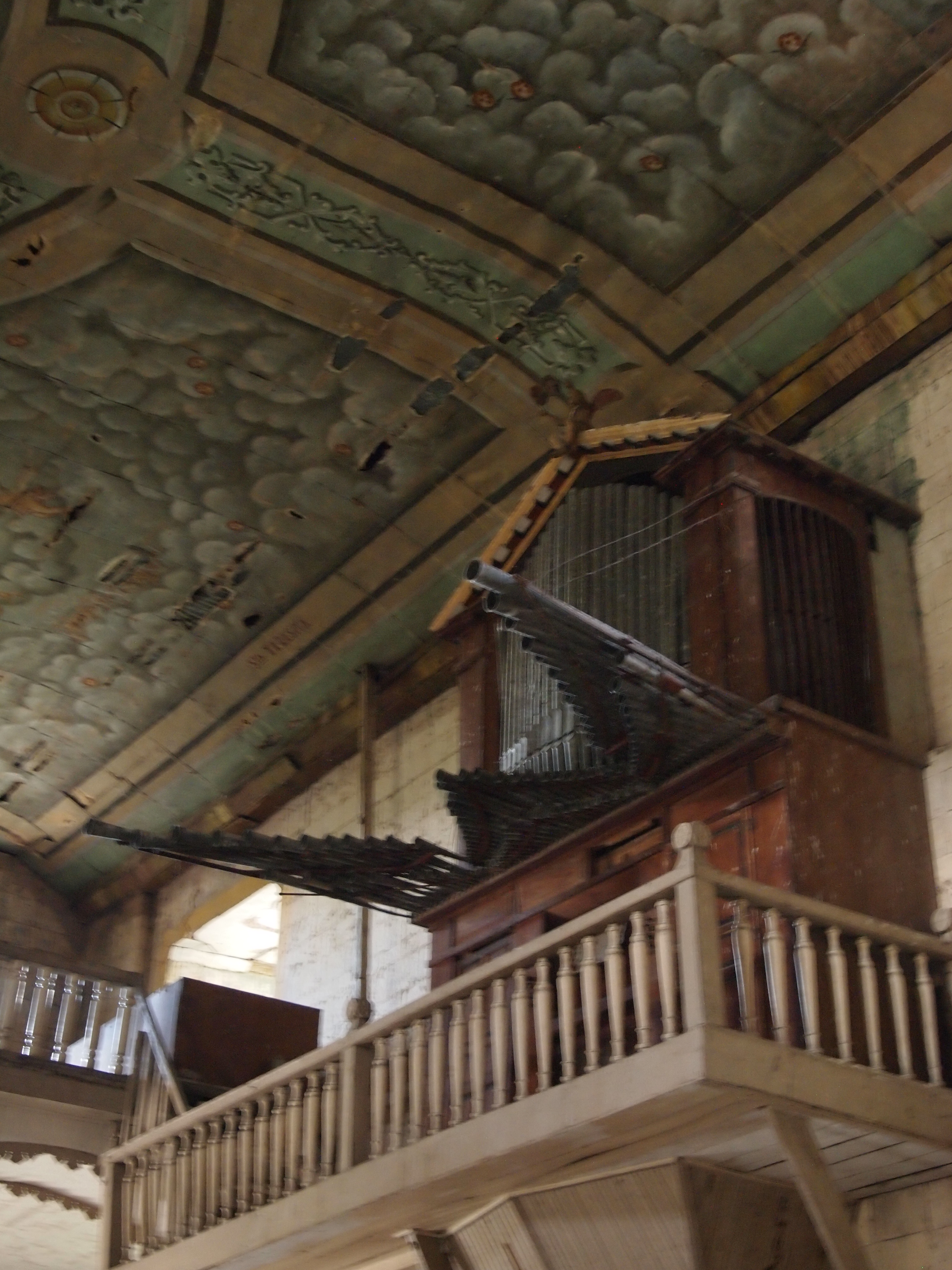
Spanish-era pipe organ

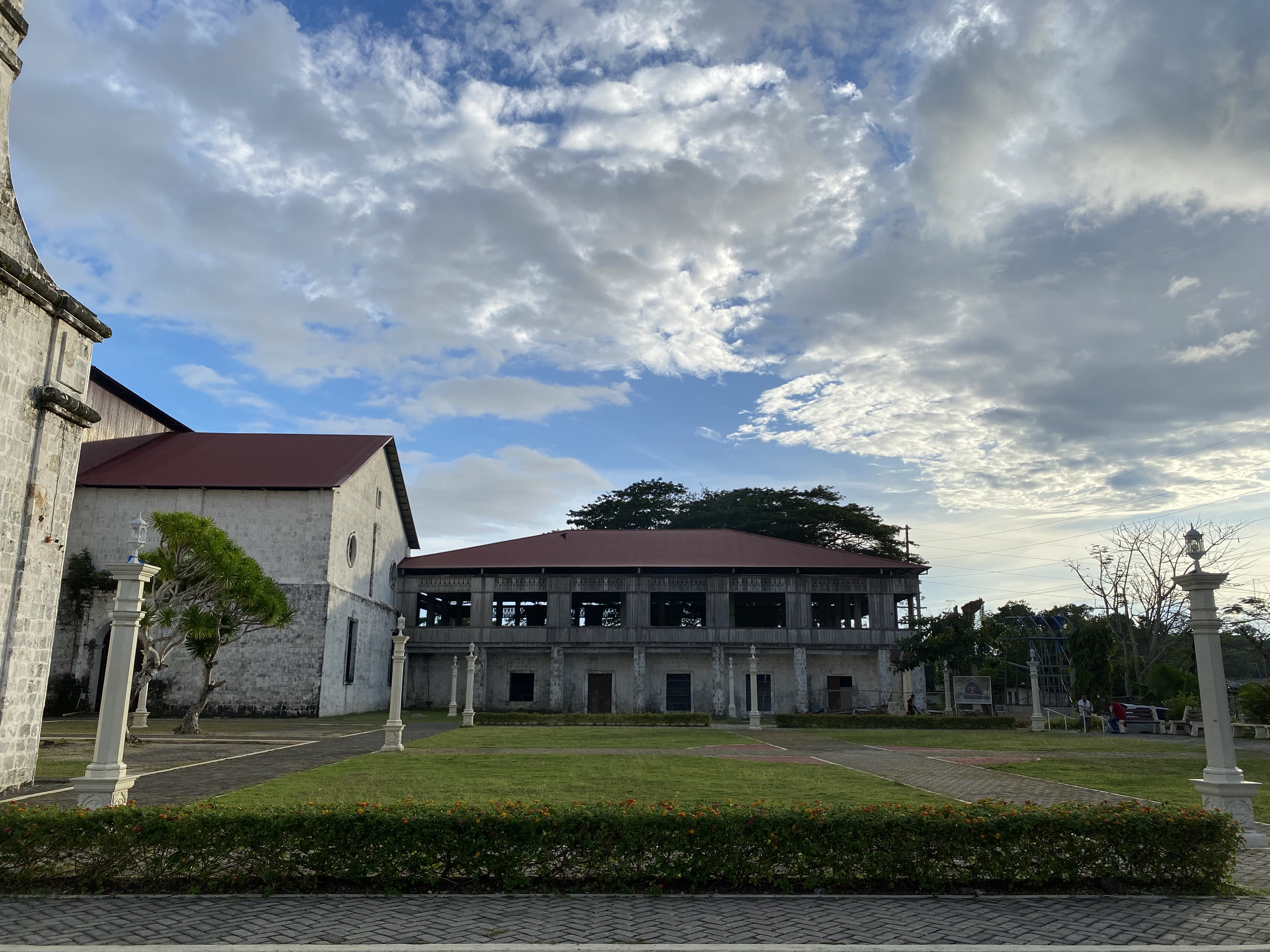
Sacristy and convent

== See also ==
- Punta Cruz Watchtower - other colonial-era structure in Maribojoc damaged by the 2013 earthquake

== Bibliography ==
- Jose, Regalado Trota (2001). Visita Iglesia Bohol (A Guide to Historic Churches). Manila: National Commission for Culture and the Arts. pp. 81–86. ISBN 9718140166.
