= Bantayan Church =

- Saints Peter and Paul Parish; Parish of Saint Peter Apostle (canon)
- Parroquia de San Pedro Apostol (Spanish)
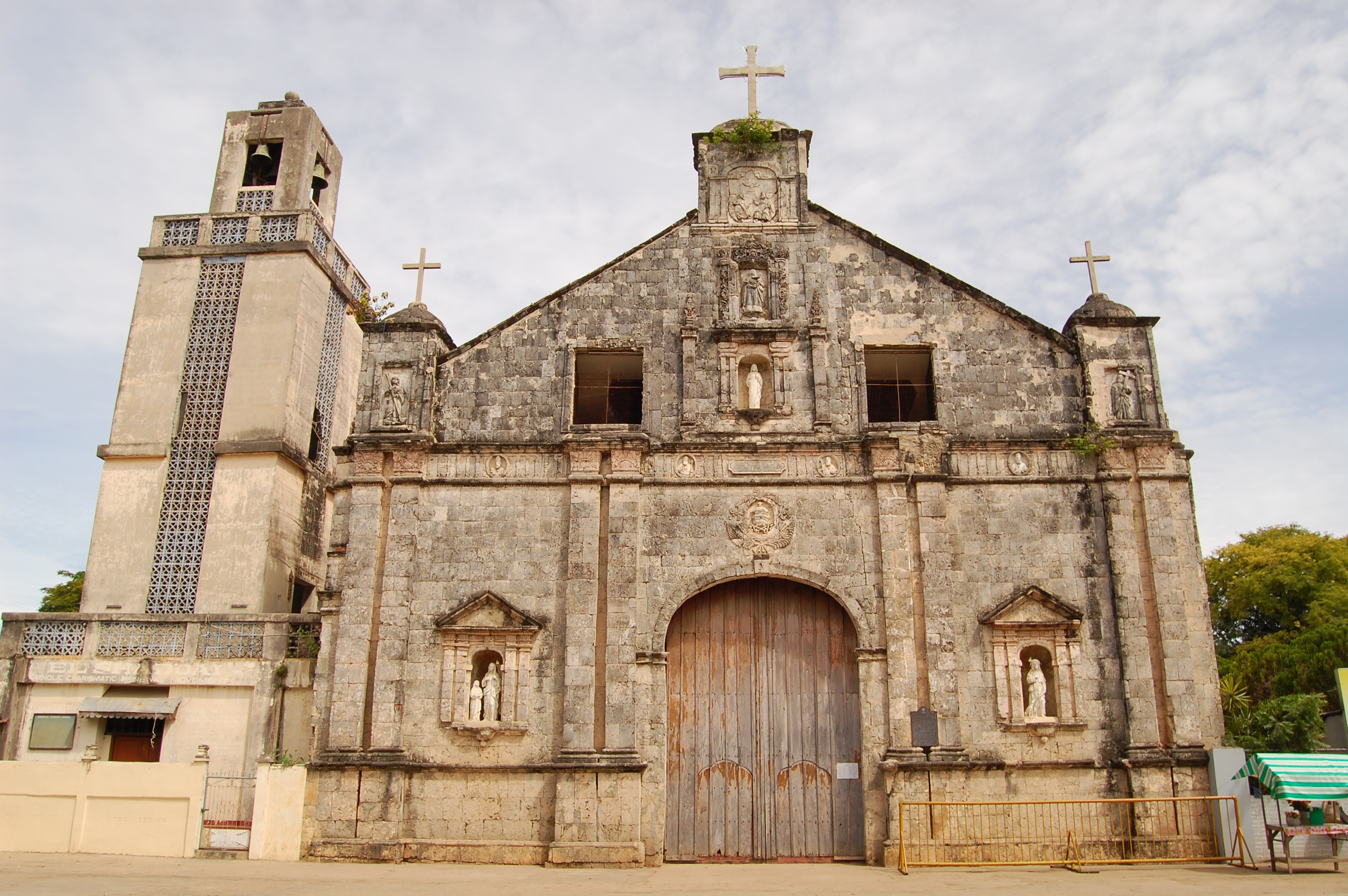
- Church facade in 2010
- Bantayan Church
- Location: Bantayan, Cebu
- Country: Philippines
- Denomination: Roman Catholic

History
- Status: Parish church
- Founded: 1580
- Dedication: Peter the Apostle

Architecture
- Architectural type: Church building
- Style: Baroque
- Groundbreaking: 1839 (Note: Current building)
- Completed: 1863

Administration
- Archdiocese: Cebu

The Saints Peter and Paul Parish Church, commonly known as Bantayan Church and canonically as Parish of Saint Peter Apostle, is a Roman Catholic church in Bantayan, Cebu, Philippines.

Its parish is the oldest in Visayas in Mindanao with the first church building built in 1580. The current structure however was built in 1863.

== History ==
=== Early years ===
The first church building of the Bantayan Church in Bantayan, Cebu was built on June 15, 1580 by the Augustinian priests. It is the oldest parish in the Philippines outside of Manila. It is also regarded as the first parish in Visayas and Mindanao. The parish also preceded the Diocese of Cebu itself which was established in 1595.

Initially known as the Convento de la Asunción de Nuestra Señora, the place of worship was initially dedicated to the Nuestra Señora de la Asuncion. It was later placed under the patronage of Peter the Apostle. The jurisdiction of the parish once extended to Maripipi in Panamao (modern day Biliran) and Limangcawayan in Leyte.

The church was burned by Muslim raiders in 1600 but was rebuilt shortly thereafter.

=== Current building ===
On July 27, 1824, Pope Leo XII granted an indult to the residents of Bantayan parish to exempt them from the practice of abstinence from meat during Lent which remained valid until 1843. The current church building was constructed from 1839 to 1863. The fisherfolk refrained from fishing due to the reconstruction activities. This and the indult is the origin to why Bantayan residents stop fishing activities and not observing abstinence from meat during the Lenten season to this day.

Its name was informally changed to the Saints Peter and Paul Parish in the 1980s when a parish priest added Paul the Apostle as the second patron saint.

In September 2018, the painting of a mural entitled Dibuho sa Kisame on the church ceiling began.

In 2022, Bishop Emilio Bataclan started the initiative to affirm the name of the parish as the Parish of Saint Peter Apostle (Spanish: Parroquia de San Pedro Apostol) with the unveiling of a parish logo.

The church was partially damaged due to the 2025 Cebu earthquake.

== Mural ==
The Dibuho sa Kisame is a 1,130-square-meter (12,200 sq ft) ceiling mural It is a visual catechism which depicts the Creation, Fall of Man, and Redemption. It was painted from 2018 to 2019 by a group of twelve artists from Cebu and Leyte, led by Aris Avelino Pastor.
