= Kuta Church Ruins =

Roman Catholic church ruins in Oriental Mindoro, Philippines

- Mga Guho ng Simbahan ng Kuta (Filipino)
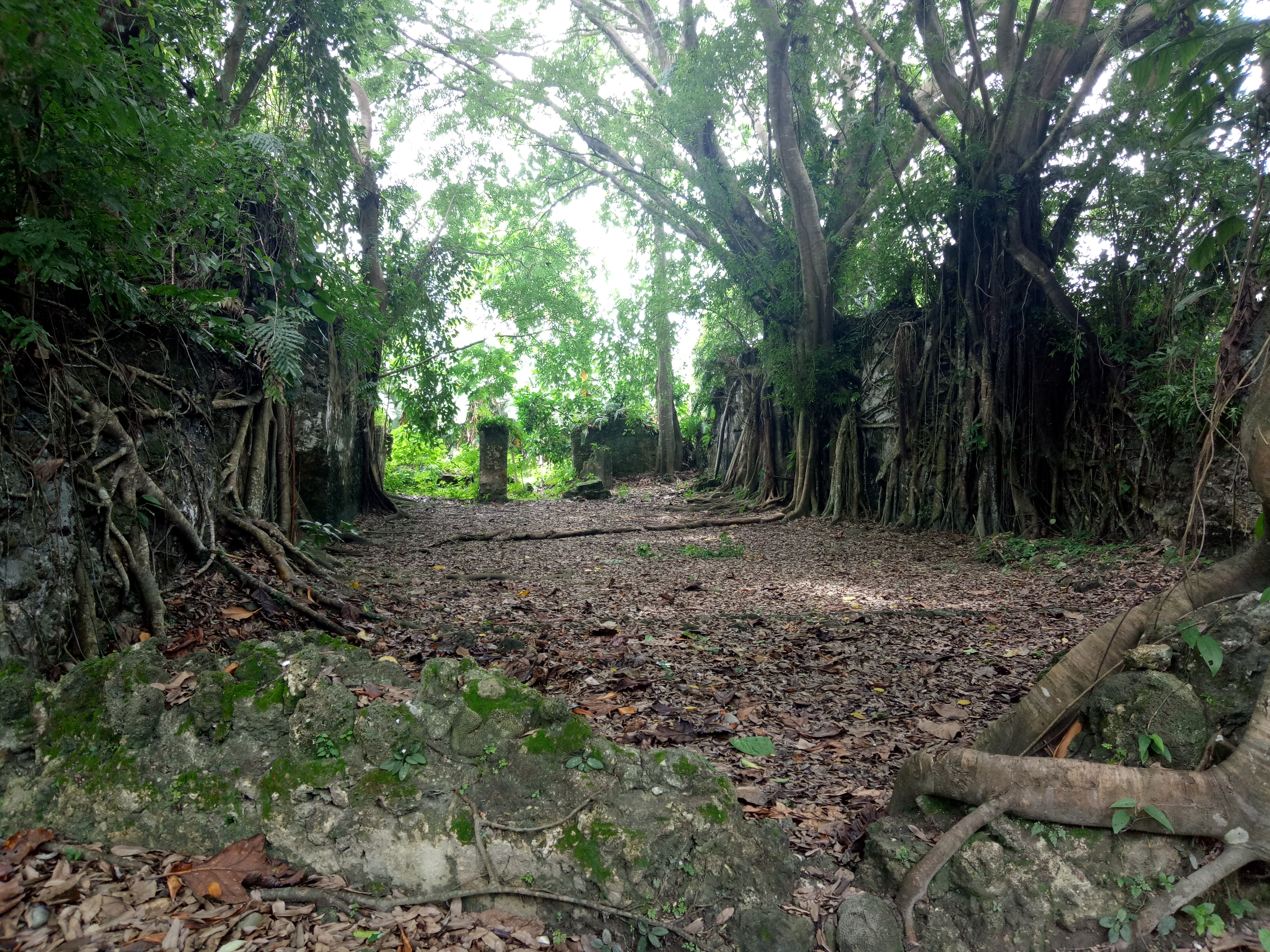
- The church ruins in 2019

- Location within Luzon Location within Philippines
- 12°43′23.81″N 121°30′44.24″E
- Type: Church
- Location: Sitio Cuta, Barangay Anilao, Bongabong, Oriental Mindoro, Philippines

Site notes
- Management: National Historical Commission of the Philippines

The Church of Kuta or Fuerza de Bongabong is a ruined 18th-century Roman Catholic church built by the Recollects in Bongabong, Oriental Mindoro, Philippines.

Model of Kuta Church located in the Municipal Hall of Bongabong

== History ==
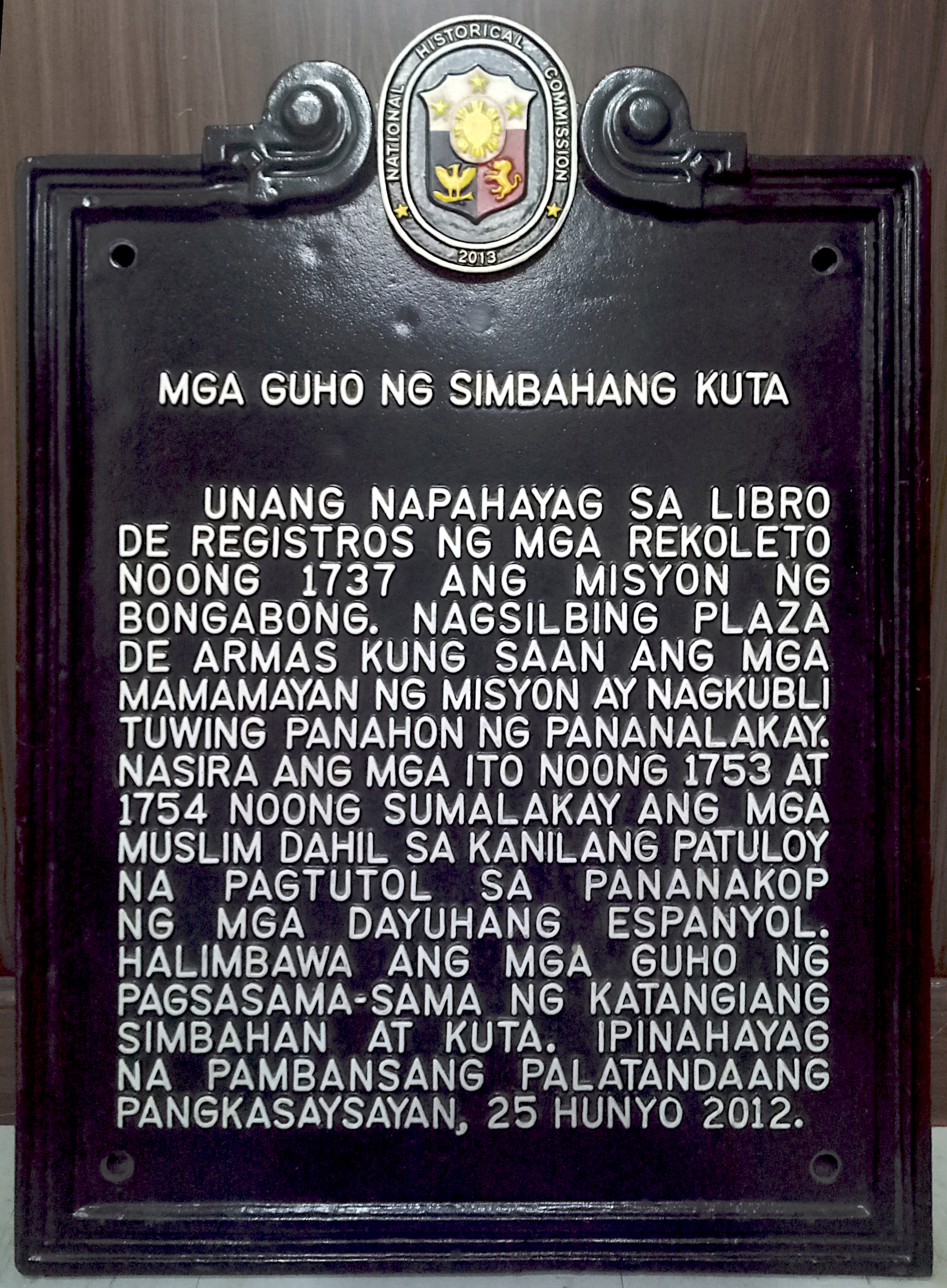
National historical marker created in 2013

The Recollect mission of Bongabong was first mentioned in the Libro de Registros in 1737. The church served as garrison for the townsfolk in times of Muslim raids. It was destroyed during the Muslim raids between 1753 and 1754.

On June 25, 2012, the site was declared by the National Historical Commission of the Philippines as a National Historical Landmark.
