= Bohol fault system =

Reverse fault system in Bohol, Philippines

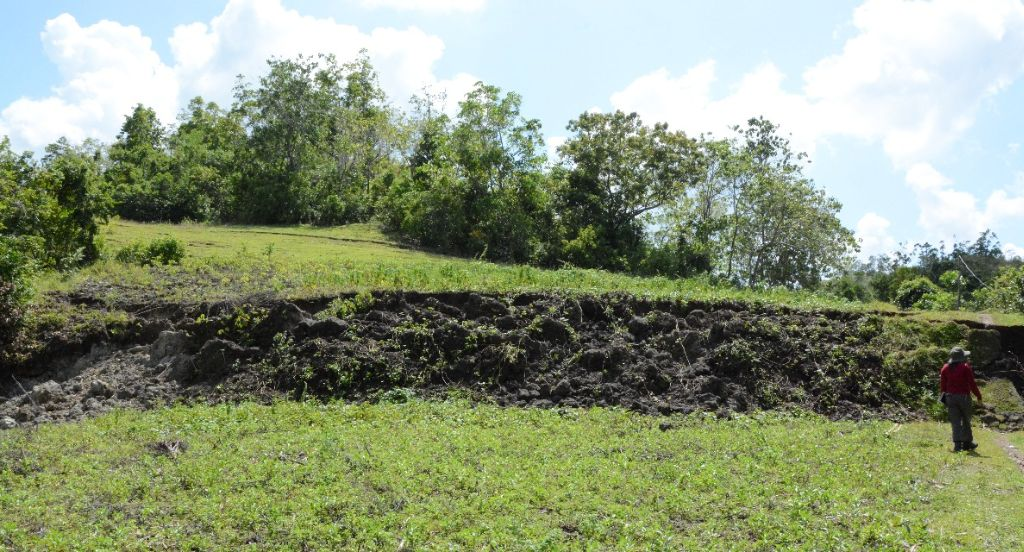
- Surface rupture of the North Bohol Fault during the 2013 Bohol earthquake at Inabanga, Bohol
- Etymology: Bohol
- Named by: Philippine Institute of Volcanology and Seismology
- Year defined: 2013
- Country: Philippines
- Region: Central Visayas
- State: Bohol
- Cities: North; Loon, Calape, Inabanga, Tubigon, Buenavista, Clarin, Sagbayan, Getafe, Trinidad; South; Maribojoc, Tagbilaran to Anda; East; Loay, Loboc, Bilar, Batuan, Carmen, Pilar

Characteristics
- Range: Inabanga & Clarin
- Segments: North Bohol Fault, East Bohol Fault
- Depth: 30 km (19 mi)

Tectonics
- Plate: Philippine Sea plate and Sunda plate
- Status: Active
- Earthquakes: 1990, 2013
- Type: Reverse fault
- Movement: Dextral
- Age: Gelasian
- Orogeny: Mindanao-Surigao-Davao Orogeny
- Volcanic arc/belt: Bohol Corridor

All known recent magnitude ≥ 6.0 M_{w} in Bohol. In 1990 (6.8 M_{w}) near Anda. and the well-known 2013 Bohol earthquake (7.2 M_{w}).

The Bohol fault system is a reverse fault system in Bohol province, Philippines. This fault system contains three segments: the newly found North Bohol Fault following the 2013 Bohol earthquake, the South Offshore Fault, and the East Bohol Fault.

The North Bohol Fault is located in Inabanga and near Clarin. The South Offshore Fault affects the southern towns, while the East Bohol Fault starts at the SW part of Bohol from Loay and goes east towards Pilar.

== Bohol fault segments ==
=== North Bohol Fault ===
The North Bohol Fault or Inabanga fault is a reverse fault located at Anonang, Inabanga which was found on 15 October 2013 during the Bohol earthquake. According to the Philippine Institute of Volcanology and Seismology, a new fault occurs only once in a century. The North Bohol fault, shaped as a hanging wall and also known as the "Great Wall of Bohol", became one of the tourist attractions in Bohol province.

=== South Offshore Fault ===
The South Offshore Fault is adjacent to the town of Anda. It affects the southern coastal towns from Anda in the east to Maribojoc in the west. The epicenter of the destructive magnitude 6.8 earthquake on February 8, 1990, was near Anda as shown in the map to the right.

=== East Bohol Fault ===
The East Bohol Fault is a dominantly strike slip fault located at the southern portion of Bohol province, opposite to the North Bohol fault.

== Bohol earthquake ==
The 2013 Bohol earthquake was a deadly event which happened on 15 October, striking the provinces of Bohol, Cebu, Negros Oriental, Masbate and Leyte.

The M_{w} 7.2 earthquake produced a ~50-km-long, ~12-km-wide northeast trending zone of uplift with an ~8-km-long discontinuous ground rupture indicating predominantly reverse-slip movement on a southeast dipping fault.

Displacement along the northeastern segment of the NBF in Inabanga is significantly larger in the northeast than in the southwest. In the northeast, the displacement was mostly 2 m and reached a maximum of 5 m, while in the southwest, the displacement was mostly less than 1 m. The maximum and average displacements, which were measured along the nearly continuous approximately 2-km-long ground rupture in Sitio Cumayot, Barangay Anonang, Inabanga, were around 5 and 2 m, respectively.

Documentation of the nearly continuous northern terminus of the earthquake ground rupture revealed its association to preexisting scarps of the previously unmapped, quaternary-active North Bohol Fault. Trenching across the rupture at four sites not only reveals the geometry and kinematics of the fault but also shows at least one or two pre-2013 surface rupturing events. Onshore geologic mapping and offshore seismic reflection profiles demonstrate the presence of an island-wide, northeast–southwest trending fold-and-thrust belt through which deformation related to the regional shortening across the Visayan Sea Basin in the central Philippines is likely distributed.

== See also ==
- Chocolate Hills
