= 1990 Bohol Sea earthquake =

Earthquake in the Philippines

- UTC time: 1990-02-08 07:15:32
- ISC event: 377912
- USGS-ANSS: ComCat
- Local date: February 8, 1990
- Local time: 15:15:32 PST
- Magnitude: 6.8 M_{w}
- Depth: 25.9 km (16 mi)
- Epicenter: 9.755°N 124.694°E
- Fault: Bohol fault system
- Type: Dip-slip
- Areas affected: Bohol, Camiguin, Siquijor
- Total damage: ₱157 million ($7 million)
- Max. intensity: PEIS VII (RFS VIII)
- Tsunami: Yes, 2 meter waves observed in Camiguin island
- Landslides: Yes
- Aftershocks: 6.6 M_{w}
- Casualties: 6 fatalities, 200+ injuries

The 1990 Bohol earthquake occurred on February 8, 1990, at 15:15:32 (UTC +8) which had a magnitude of 6.8 M_{w}. The earthquake had a moderate depth of 25.9 km (16 mi). Most of the damage was observed in the province of Bohol. A tsunami hit the southeastern coastline of Bohol and the island of Camiguin. There were 6 deaths, over 200 injuries and an estimated ₱157 million ($7 million) in total damage reported.

Twenty-three years later, a much more devastating 7.2 M_{w} under the same fault system would strike the island killing 222 individuals.

== Tectonic setting ==
The Philippines is usually prone to earthquakes due to its location within the Pacific Ring of Fire, where most of the world's seismological events occur. The Bohol Sea is home to segments of the Philippine fault system, a system of fault line extending from the Northwestern province of Ilocos Sur, transversing through Quezon province, Masbate Island and the Eastern Visayas region, and ending at the end of Davao Gulf. The fault that had ruptured suggested a northeast–southwest trending nodal plane. However, overlaying layers of milocene dated limestone suggested that the fault was inactive for numerous years.

== Earthquake ==
The epicentre of the quake was located 17 km southeast of Tagbilaran and was due to the rupture of an unknown normal fault line offshore Bohol island. The ruptures have caused dipping in a southeastern direction. It recorded a moment magnitude of 6.7–6.8, measuring an intensity of VII (Destructive) on the PHIVOLCS Intensity Scale, as well as a maximum intensity of VIII (Damaging tremor) on the Rossi-Forrel scale recorded in Tagbilaran.

Approximately 30 minutes after the mainshock, an aftershock with a close magnitude of 6.6 M_{w}occurred near the same area, with a different slip pattern, directing in a northwestward direction. The said aftershock caused some damage and further worsened the conditions from the already affected buildings.

=== Tsunami ===
The rupture from the unknown fault that caused tsunami waves reported as high as 2 meters to strike the surrounding islands nearby. There were no damage reported from the waves.

== Casualties and damage ==
Damage was mostly sustained by the Eastern and Southeastern Coastline of Bohol most of which were due to poorly built infrastructure that could not stand such strong movement. Estimates say that about 3,000 units of houses and other structures as well as 182 of which were totally demolished such as a bridge connecting the towns of Jagna and Duero and roads to the town of Anda. Landslides, Fissures, multiple Mud Volcanoes, and a drastic increase of sea levels were observed in particular places near the epicenter. The total cost is estimated at ₱157 million ($7 million).

There were 6 confirmed deaths from the quake and at least 200 injuries. A further 46,000 were displaced and 7,000 homeless.

== See also ==
- 2013 Bohol earthquake
- List of earthquakes in 1990
- List of earthquakes in the Philippines
