= 2013 Bohol earthquake =

Magnitude 7.2 earthquake in Bohol

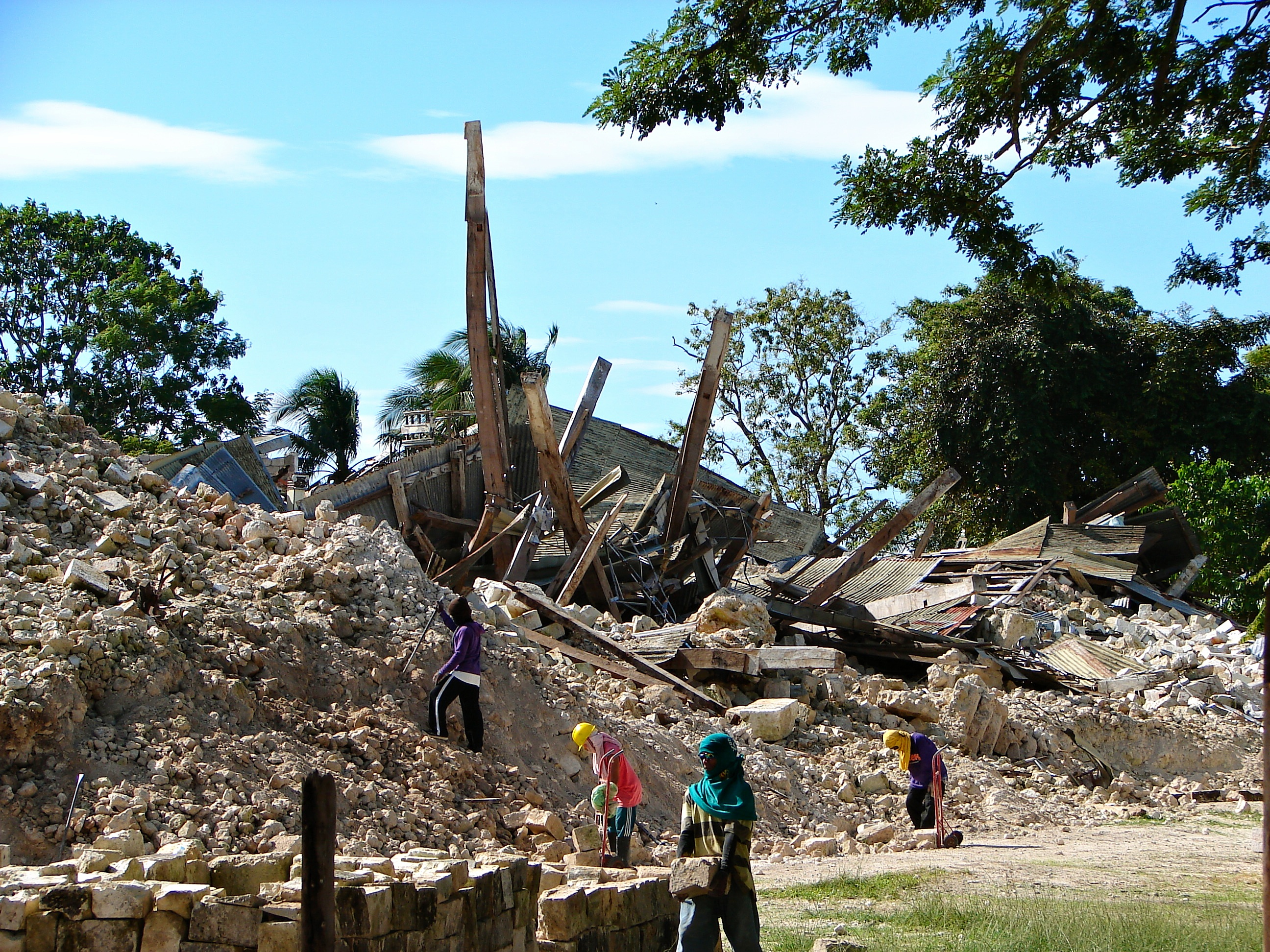
- The rubble of the Church of Our Lady of Light in Loon, Bohol, the oldest and one of the largest in the province

- Location within Visayas Location within Philippines
- UTC time: 2013-10-15 00:12:32
- ISC event: 609078498
- USGS-ANSS: ComCat
- Local date: October 15, 2013
- Local time: 8:12:31 PST
- Duration: 34 seconds
- Magnitude: M_{w} 7.2
- Depth: 12 km (7.5 mi)
- Epicenter: 9.880°N 124.117°E
- Fault: North Bohol Fault
- Type: Reverse
- Areas affected: Philippines
- Max. intensity: PEIS VIII (MMI IX)
- Peak acceleration: 0.7—0.8 g
- Landslides: Cebu: Aloguinsan, Argao, Boljoon; Bohol: Alicia, Antequera, Balilihan, Bilar, Carmen, Clarin, Corella, Cortes, Danao, Dimiao, Lila, Loboc, Loon
- Aftershocks: 4,465 (122 felt) (as of December 31, 2013)
- Casualties: 222 dead; 8 missing; 976 injured

The 2013 Bohol earthquake occurred on October 15 at 8:12:31 PST in Bohol, an island province located in Central Visayas, Philippines. The magnitude of the earthquake was recorded at M_{w} 7.2, its epicenter in the vicinity of 6 kilometres (3.7 mi) S 24° W of Sagbayan, and its depth of focus at 12 kilometres (7.5 mi). It affected the whole Central Visayas region, particularly Bohol and Cebu. The earthquake was felt in the whole Visayas area and as far as Masbate island in the north and Cotabato provinces in southern Mindanao.

According to official reports by the National Disaster Risk Reduction and Management Council (NDRRMC), 222 were reported dead, 8 were missing, and 976 people were injured. In all, more than 73,000 structures were damaged, of which more than 14,500 were destroyed.

It was the deadliest earthquake in the Philippines in 23 years since the 1990 Luzon earthquake. The energy released by the quake was equivalent to 32 of the atomic bomb dropped in Hiroshima. Previously, Bohol was also hit by an earthquake on February 8, 1990 that damaged several buildings and caused a tsunami.

On November 8 (November 7 UTC), just three weeks after the earthquake, Super Typhoon Haiyan (Yolanda) struck the region. Although the storm's eye missed the area affected by the earthquake, it sent some 40,000 Boholanos still living in temporary shelters back to evacuation centers and disrupted relief efforts in the province.

== Geology ==
The earthquake produced an approximate 50 kilometres (31 mi)-long, 12 kilometres (7.5 mi)-wide northeast trending zone of uplift with an approximate 8 kilometres (5.0 mi) long discontinuous ground rupture indicating predominantly reverse-slip movement on a southeast dipping fault.

Initially it was thought that the epicenter was 2 kilometres (1.2 mi) east of Carmen, Bohol, triggered by the East Bohol Fault. However, according to the Philippine Institute of Volcanology and Seismology (PHIVOLCS), the 7.2 earthquake may have been caused by a previously undiscovered fault transecting Bohol running east-northeast-west-southwest parallel to the island's northwest coast. This was apparent in the pattern of epicenters of the subsequent aftershocks.

Documentation of the nearly continuous northern terminus of the earthquake ground rupture revealed its association to preexisting scarps of the previously unmapped, Quaternary-active North Bohol Fault (NBH). Trenching across the rupture at four sites not only reveals the geometry and kinematics of the fault but also shows at least one or two pre-2013 surface rupturing events. Onshore geologic mapping and offshore seismic reflection profiles demonstrate the presence of an island-wide, northeast–southwest trending fold-and-thrust belt through which deformation related to the regional shortening across the Visayan Sea Basin in the central Philippines is likely distributed.

Displacement along the northeastern segment of the NBF in Inabanga is significantly larger in the northeast than in the southwest. In the northeast, the displacement is mostly 2 metres (6 ft 7 in) and reaches a maximum of 5 metres (16 ft), while in the southwest, the displacement is mostly less than 1 metre (3 ft 3 in). The maximum and average displacements, which were measured along the nearly continuous approximately 2 kilometres (1.2 mi) long ground rupture in Sitio Cumayot, Barangay Anonang, Inabanga, are around 5 and 2 metres (16.4 and 6.6 ft), respectively.

=== Seismic intensity ===
PEIS reported intensities
Intensity Scales	Location
VIII	Antequera; Buenavista; Carmen; Catigbian; Clarin; Inabanga; Loon; Maribojoc; Sagbayan; Tubigon (BOHOL)
VII	Tagbilaran City, Bohol; Cebu City; Lapu Lapu City; Mandaue City; Toledo City; Carcar City; Naga City (CEBU)
VI	Hinigaran, Negros Occidental; Dumaguete City; Siquijor Island
V	Iloilo City; La Carlota City; Guimaras Island; Abuyog, Leyte; Ozamis City; Sibulan, Negros Oriental; Camiguin Island; Gingoog, Misamis Oriental; Cagayan de Oro City
IV	Roxas City; Masbate City; Bulusan, Sorsogon; Hinunangan; Tabon Tabon; San Pablo; Bato, Leyte; Patnungon, Antique; Dipolog City; Bacolod City; Naval, Biliran; Bayawan City; Baybay, Southern Leyte; San Jose Antique; Guihulngan, Negros Oriental; Butuan; Tacloban City

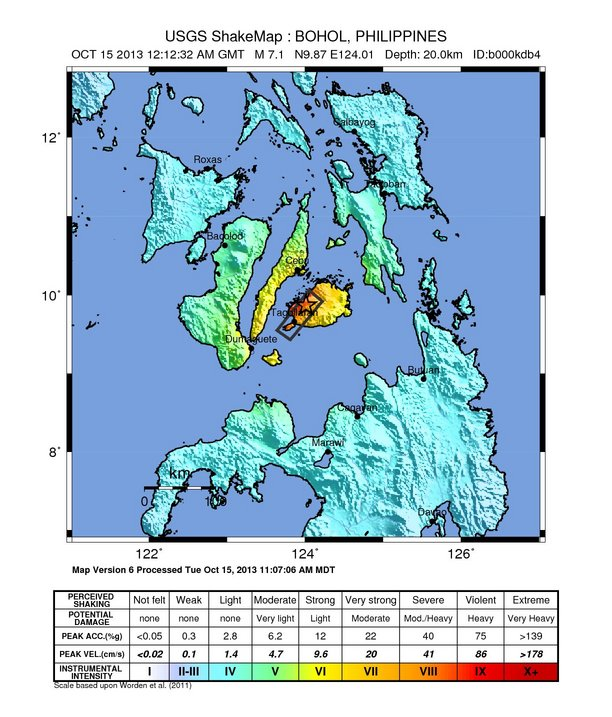
Shakemap for the event

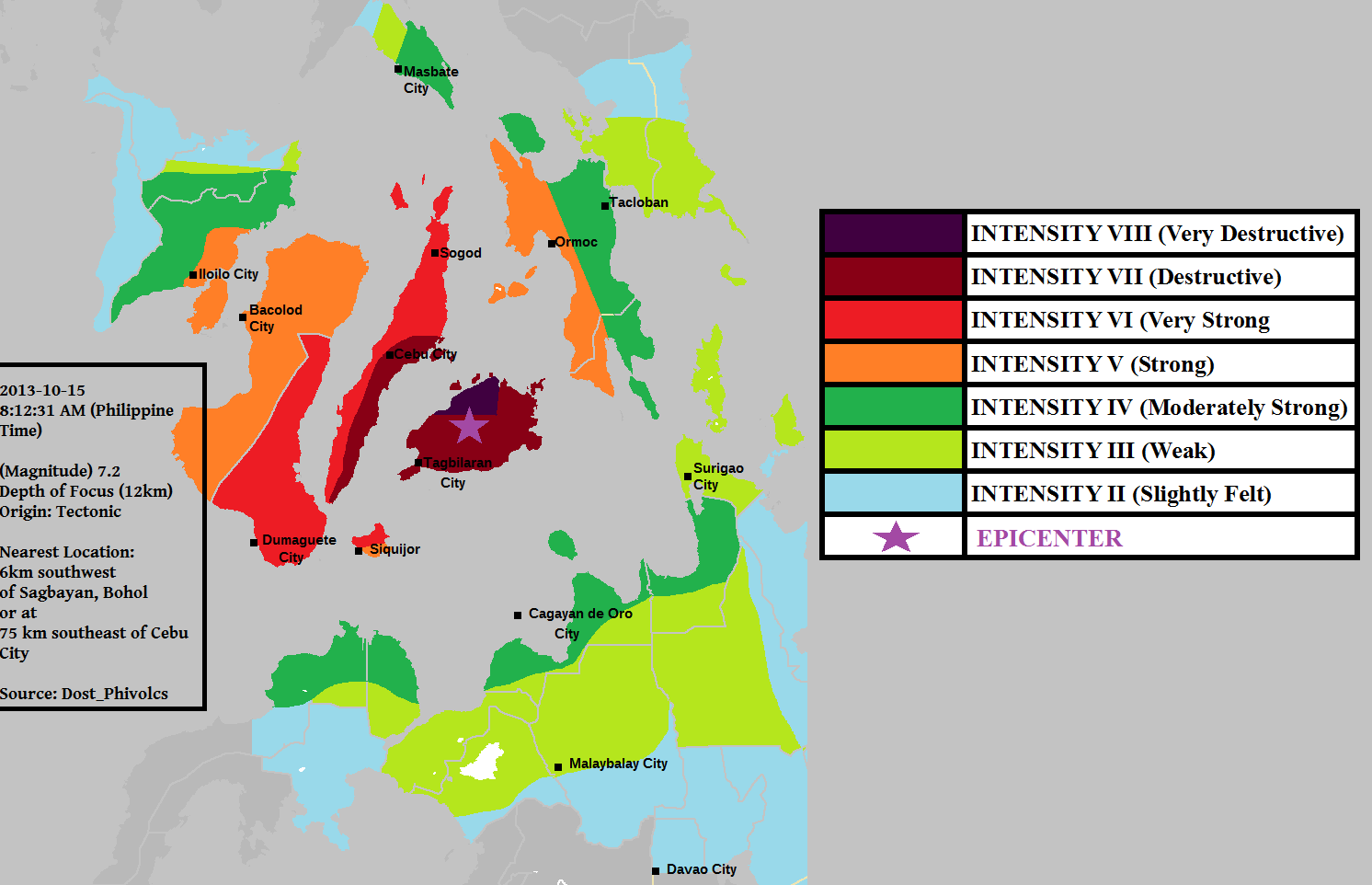
Intensity map during the earthquake

=== North Bohol Fault ===
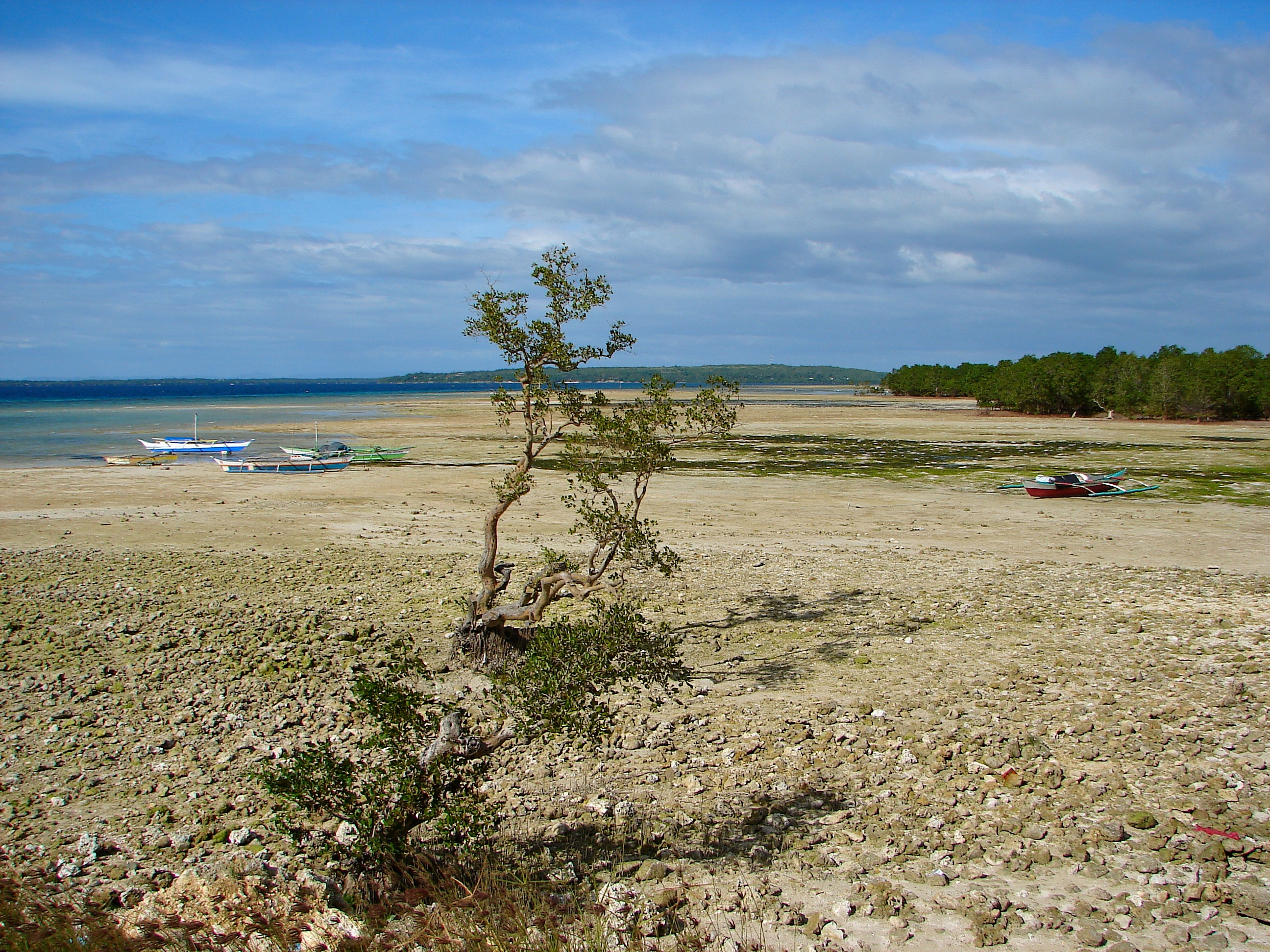
Raised sea bottom at Loon (the water used to extend to the mangroves at right)

PHIVOLCS reported that the NBF, which generated the earthquake, is a northeast–southwest trending reverse fault along the western sector of Bohol island. Surface ruptures ranging from 0.10 metres (3.9 in) to as high as 5 metres (16 ft) in vertical displacements were exposed in barangay Anonang in Inabanga, Bohol. The mapped surface of the NBF is 6 kilometres (3.7 mi) long from barangay New Anonang in Buenavista to barangay Napo in Inabanga and generally trends 40 degrees northeast and dips at 50 degrees southeast.

The longest, continuous individual trace mapped by the team is approximately 2 kilometres (1.2 mi) in Anonang. In this barangay, surface rupture trends 40 degrees northeast. The surface rupture manifested as prominent fault scarps, which range from 2 metres (6 ft 7 in) to 5 metres (16 ft) of vertical displacements. Other geomorphic manifestations observed in Anonang include 2.5 metres (8 ft 2 in) vertical displacement of Cawasan Creek in Sitio Calubian, producing a small waterfall at the point where the fault transects the creek. Other typical features associated with reverse faulting, such as scallops, bulges and warps, were also observed in the deformation zone, which extended as wide as 30 metres (98 ft) in some places.

=== Aftershocks ===
Aftershocks continued to rattle Bohol Island and Cebu for several months. By December 6, 2013, 4,026 aftershocks were recorded, 114 of which were felt. Included in the aftershocks was the 5.3 magnitude tremor experienced at 12:59 a.m. on October 26, and another 4.8 magnitude quake at 1:28 p.m. on November 12, centered at San Isidro, Bohol.

== Warnings ==
The Pacific Tsunami Warning Center did not issue a Pacific-wide tsunami threat. The United States Geological Survey issued a yellow warning, saying "some casualties and damage are possible and the impact should be relatively localized. Past yellow alerts have required a local or regional level response." SHOA, of the Chilean Navy, stated the earthquake would not affect national or South American coasts.

== Casualties and infrastructure damage ==
The earthquake struck as the Philippines was observing the Muslim holiday of Eid-al-Adha. The public holiday had closed schools, some businesses, and offices which helped reduce the number of casualties.

A total of ₱2.25 billion worth of damage to public buildings, roads, bridges, and flood controls was reported in Bohol and Cebu. A total of 671,103 families or more than 3.2 million people were affected by the quake. Out of the total number of affected, 71,822 families or more than 348,000 people were displaced.

=== Bohol ===
The most casualties and damage occurred in Bohol. A total of 209 people were confirmed dead, 877 people were confirmed injured, and eight confirmed missing. A rough estimate of the damage was expected to be at least at ₱2.2 billion. The town of Loon had the largest number fatalities (67). A total of 1,255,128 people (the province's entire population) were affected by the quake. Nearly 71,900 residential houses were damaged (out of which 14,480 were destroyed), with the towns of Loon, Tubigon, Carmen, and Calape among the worst affected.

A building at the Tagbilaran Port Terminal and a ceiling of the second floor and the tower of Tagbilaran Airport collapsed. Loboc Church, Loon Church and Maribojoc Church collapsed; the façade of Baclayon Church and its bell tower were totally damaged. Other churches, including those in Loay, Dauis, Dimiao, and Tubigon were also severely damaged. In Carmen, a freestanding bell tower and an observation deck in the island's renowned Chocolate Hills were destroyed, with some hills themselves damaged by landslides.

Several government buildings and numerous schools in the province were also partially or totally damaged, including the municipal halls of twelve towns. The provincial district hospital in Loon collapsed, trapping and killing patients. Some 32 bridges, including many along the National Road, and 13 road sections were damaged and impassable, hampering aid efforts. Energy services in the province were also cut off.

Damage in Bohol

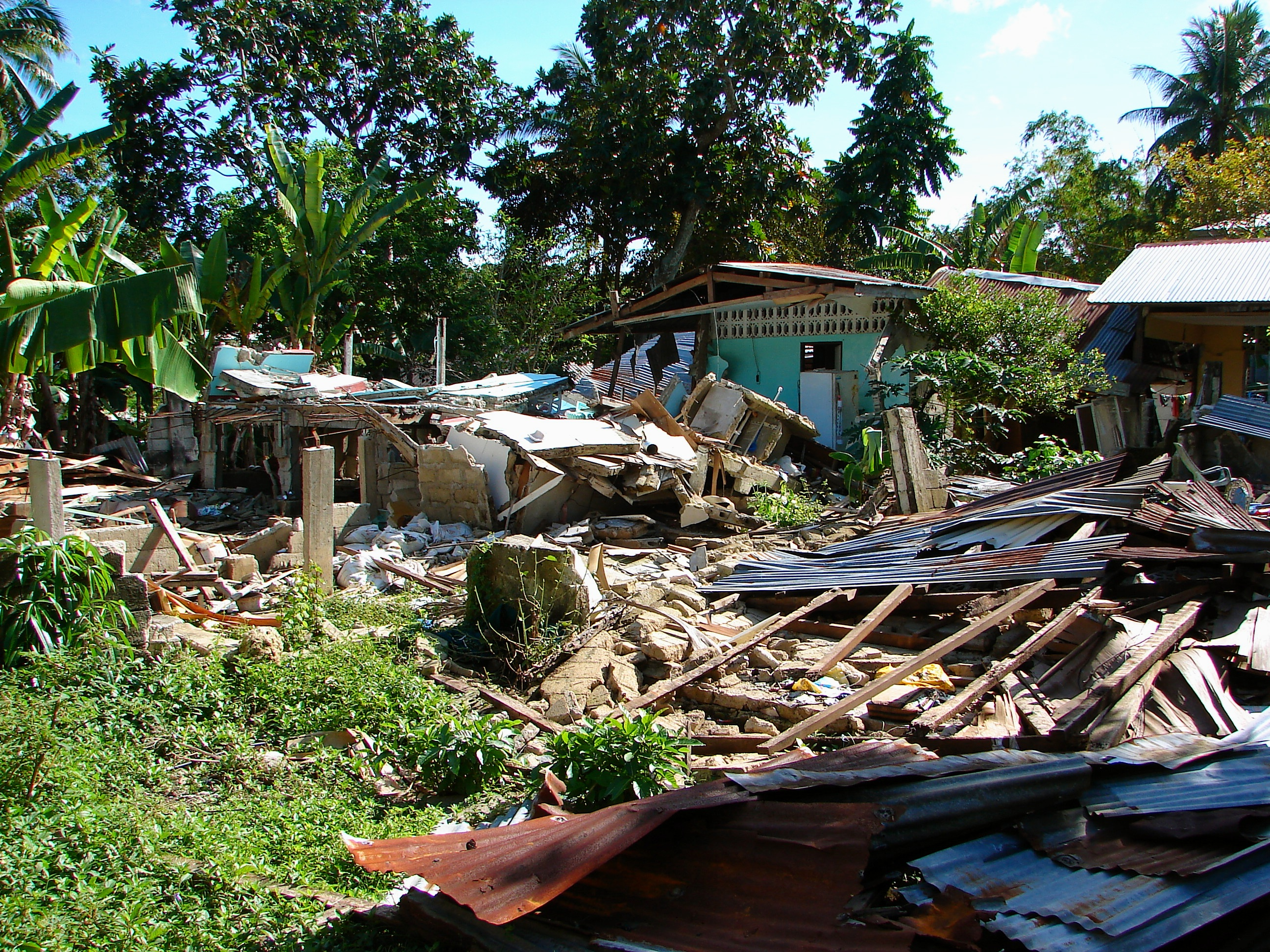
Destroyed houses in Loon

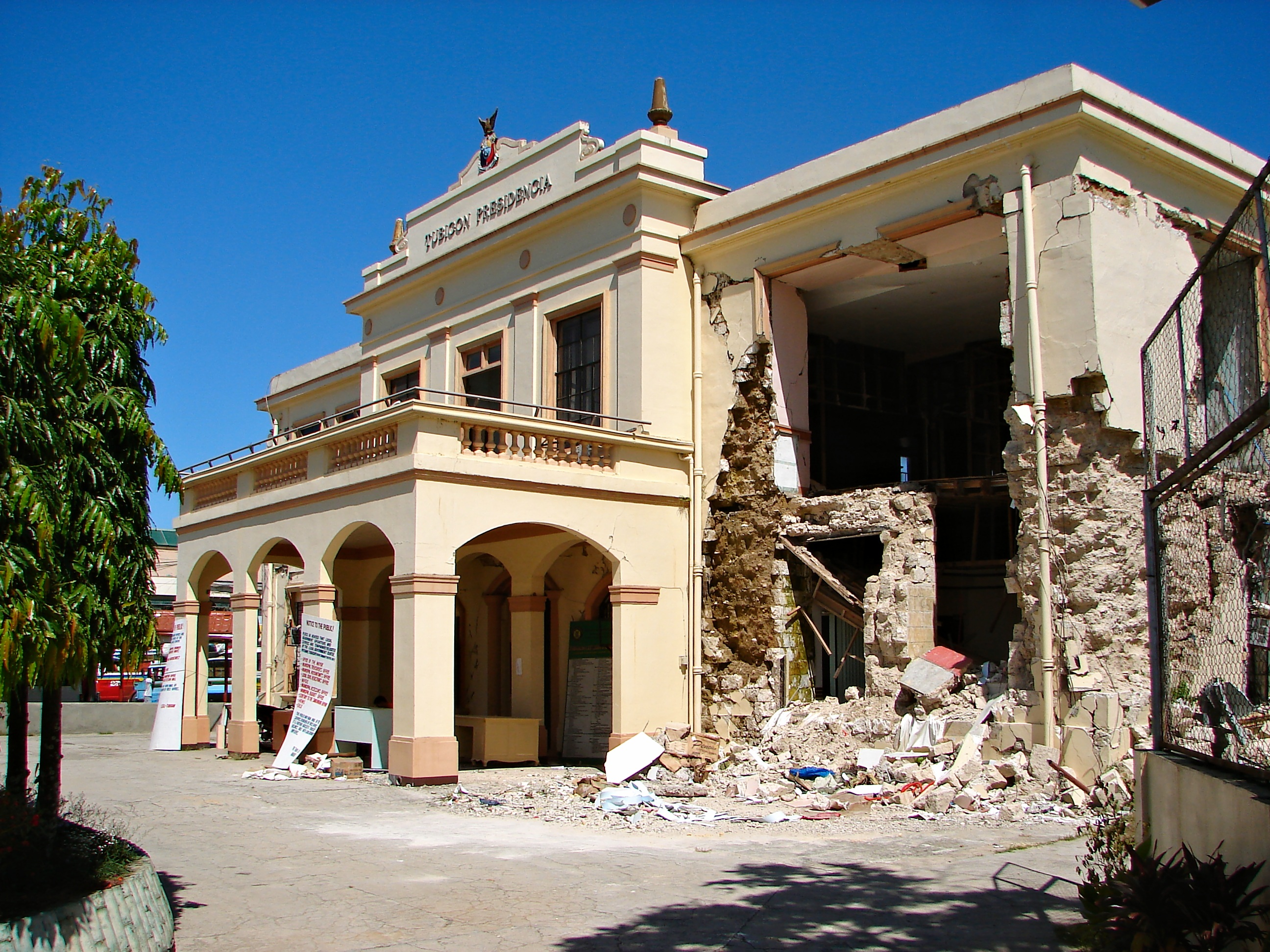
Destroyed town hall of Tubigon

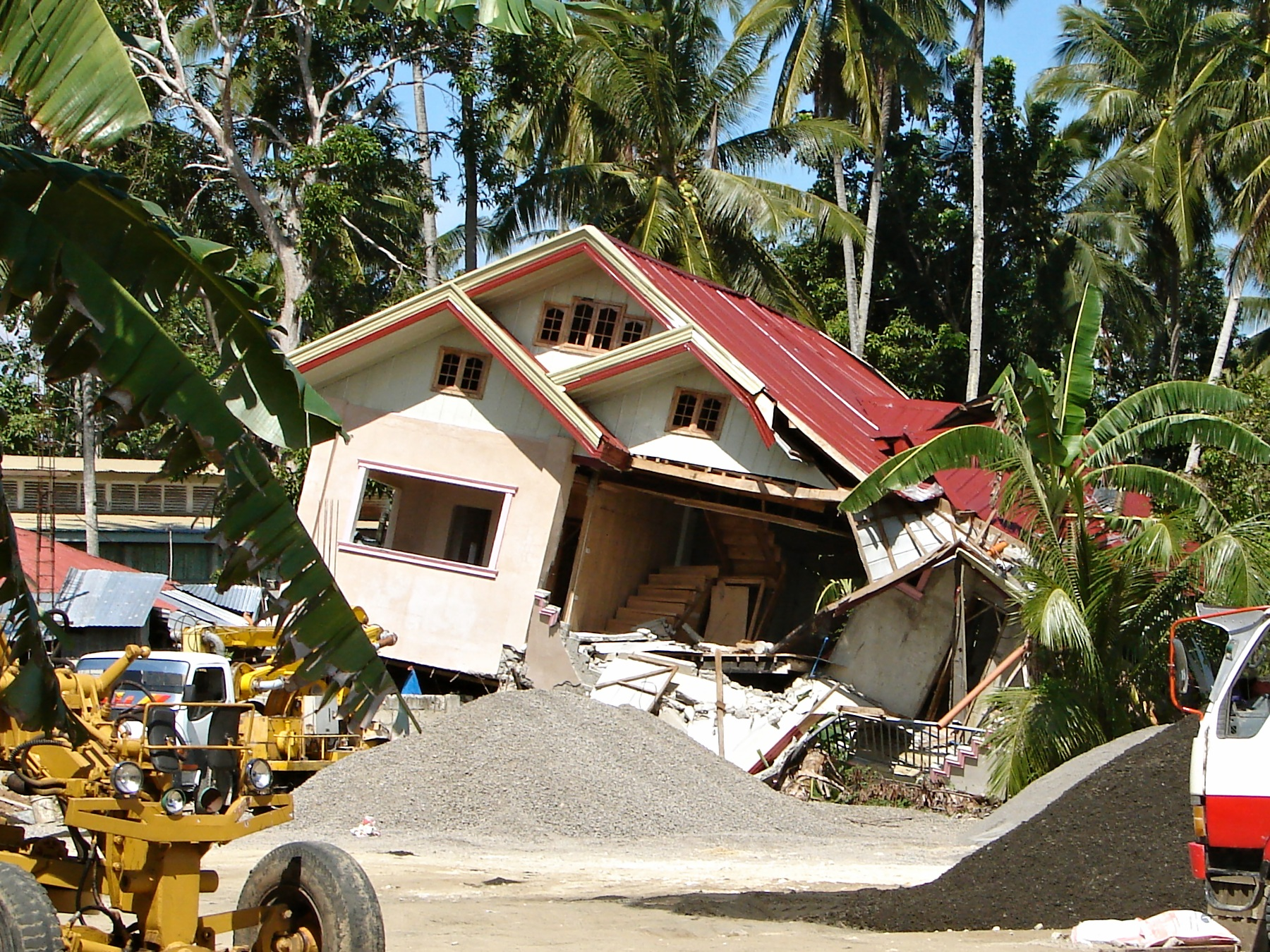
Destroyed house in Tubigon

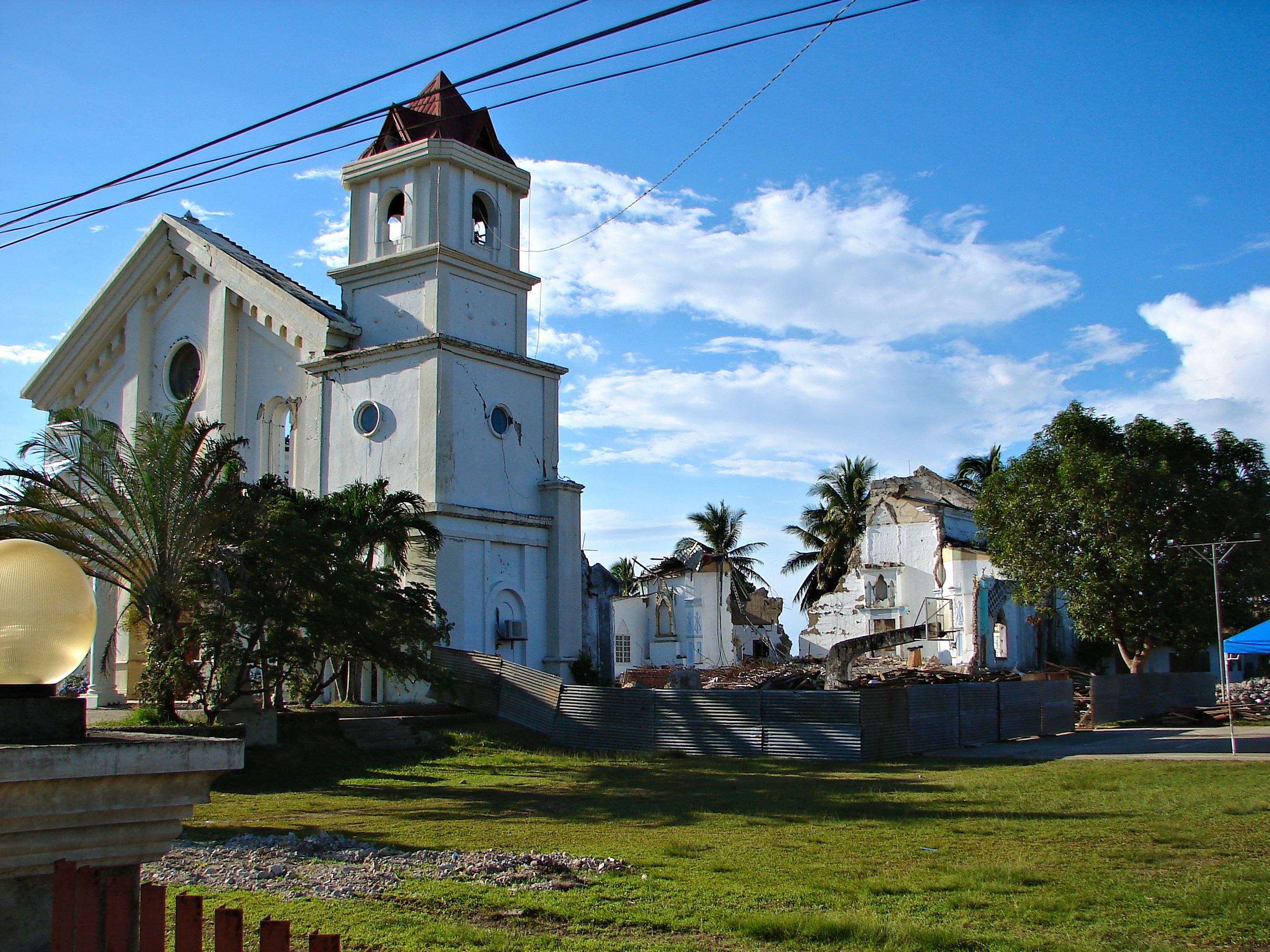
Destroyed church in Clarin

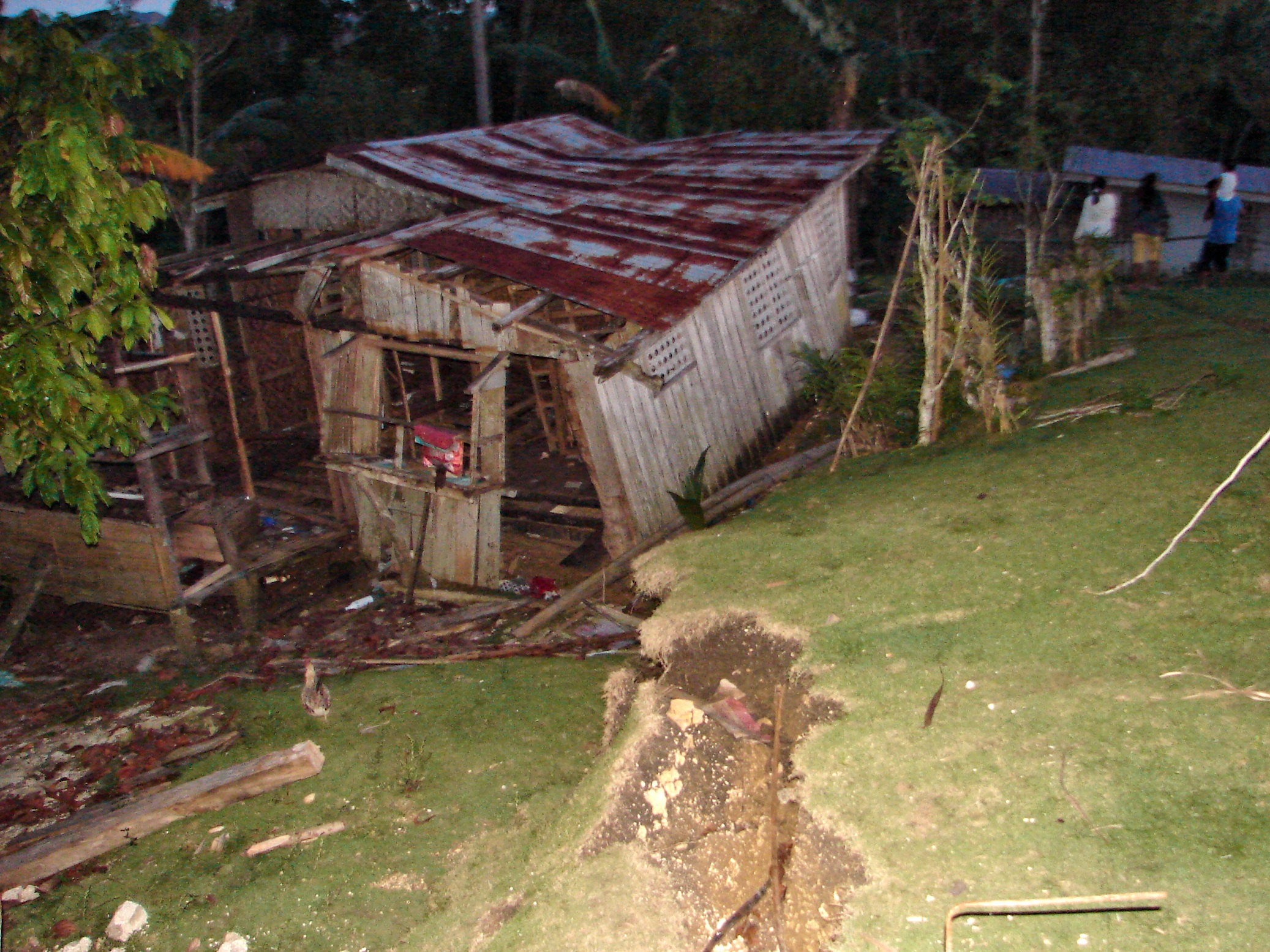
Destroyed home in Catigbian and ground rupture

=== Cebu ===
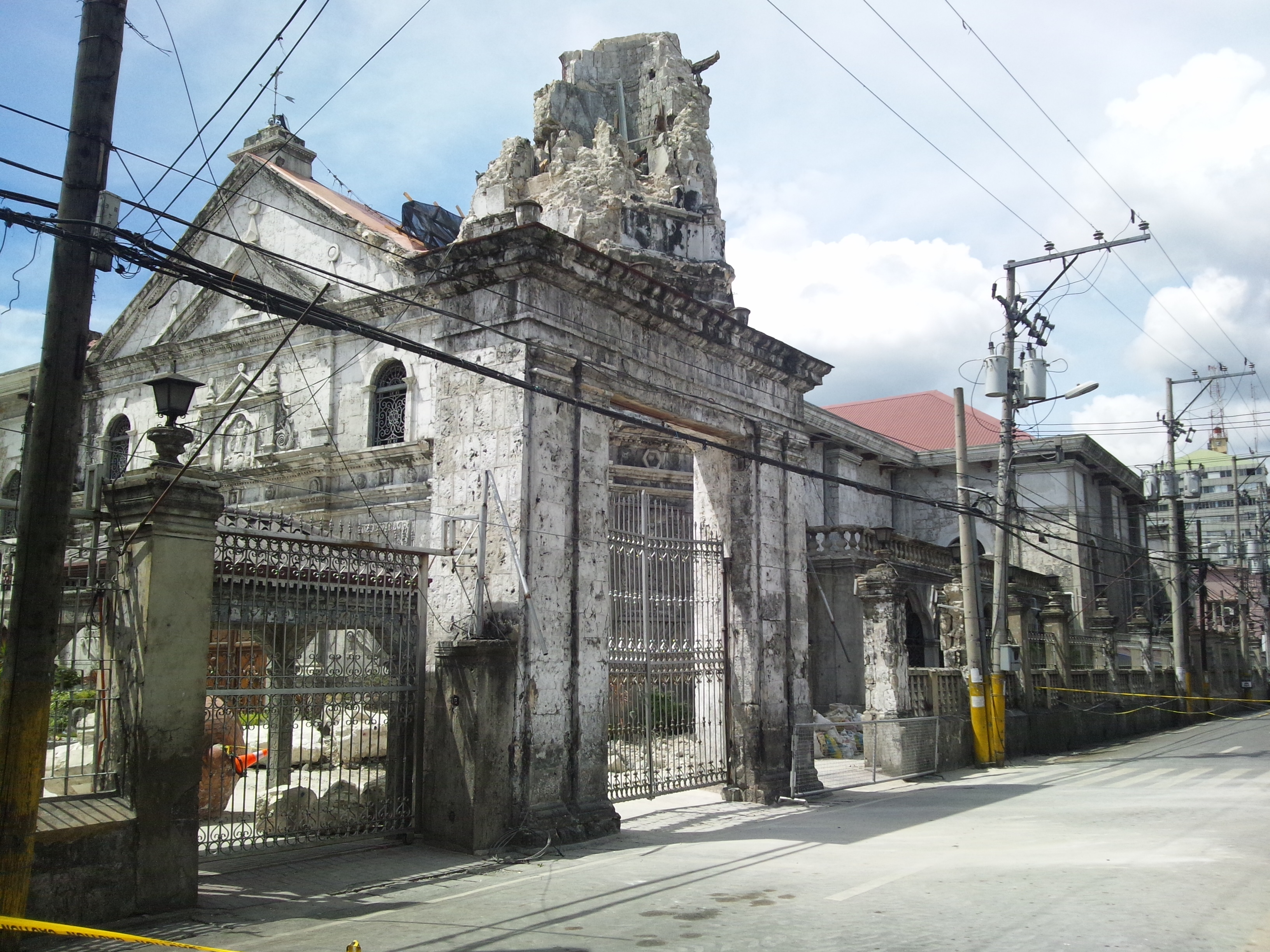
Basilica Minore del Santo Niño

Intensity V–VI was experienced at Metro and Southern Cebu, while the rest of Cebu experienced intensity VI. Twelve people were confirmed dead, 96 were injured, and a total of 404,107 families, or more than 1.9 million people were affected by the quake.

Several structures in Cebu City incurred total and partial damage. A building in Pasil Fish Port collapsed killing five people and injuring seven people. The Basilica Minore del Santo Niño's bell tower also collapsed. Cebu Provincial Capitol was badly hit by the quake. Several hospitals such as Cebu Doctors' University Hospital and St. Vincent Hospital incurred damage. A stampede in a gym caused five deaths and injured eight. A part of Mandaue City Public Market also collapsed, reportedly killing a vendor.

=== Other Visayas islands ===
Intensity VI was recorded in Hinigaran, Negros Occidental; intensity V in Iloilo, Bacolod, La Carlota, Guimaras, Abuyog, Baybay, and Bato in Leyte, Hinunangan, Saint Bernard, Maasin and Macrohon in Southern Leyte, and Sibulan in Negros Oriental; intensity IV in Roxas City, Masbate, Bulusan in Sorsogon, Patnongon and San Jose in Antique, Leon in Antique, Tacloban in Leyte, Tabon, and Borongan in Samar; Intensity IV and V at various towns in Aklan.

In Negros Occidental, several private buildings incurred damage. In Iloilo, the administration office of Iloilo Airport was slightly damaged. In Siquijor, one person had died and three people were injured from the quake. Two people, one from Negros Oriental and one from Iloilo, were also injured.

=== Mindanao ===
The quake was felt in intensity V in Cagayan de Oro and Gingoog in Misamis Oriental, Surigao and Butuan in Agusan del Norte; intensity IV in Davao City, Cotabato, Zamboanga, Bukidnon, Zamboanga del Norte and Tacurong but no people were reported dead. There were no casualties, and damage to properties and infrastructures in Mindanao.

== Effects ==
=== Transportation ===
Several flights from Cebu and Bohol airports and airport operations were put on hold as a response to check the safety status of the airport buildings. Mactan International Airport was later opened before midday; flights between Manila and Bohol were delayed due to temporary suspension of operations in Tagbilaran Airport for about three hours. By October 17, all operations of seaports in Bohol and Cebu were back to normal.

=== Health ===
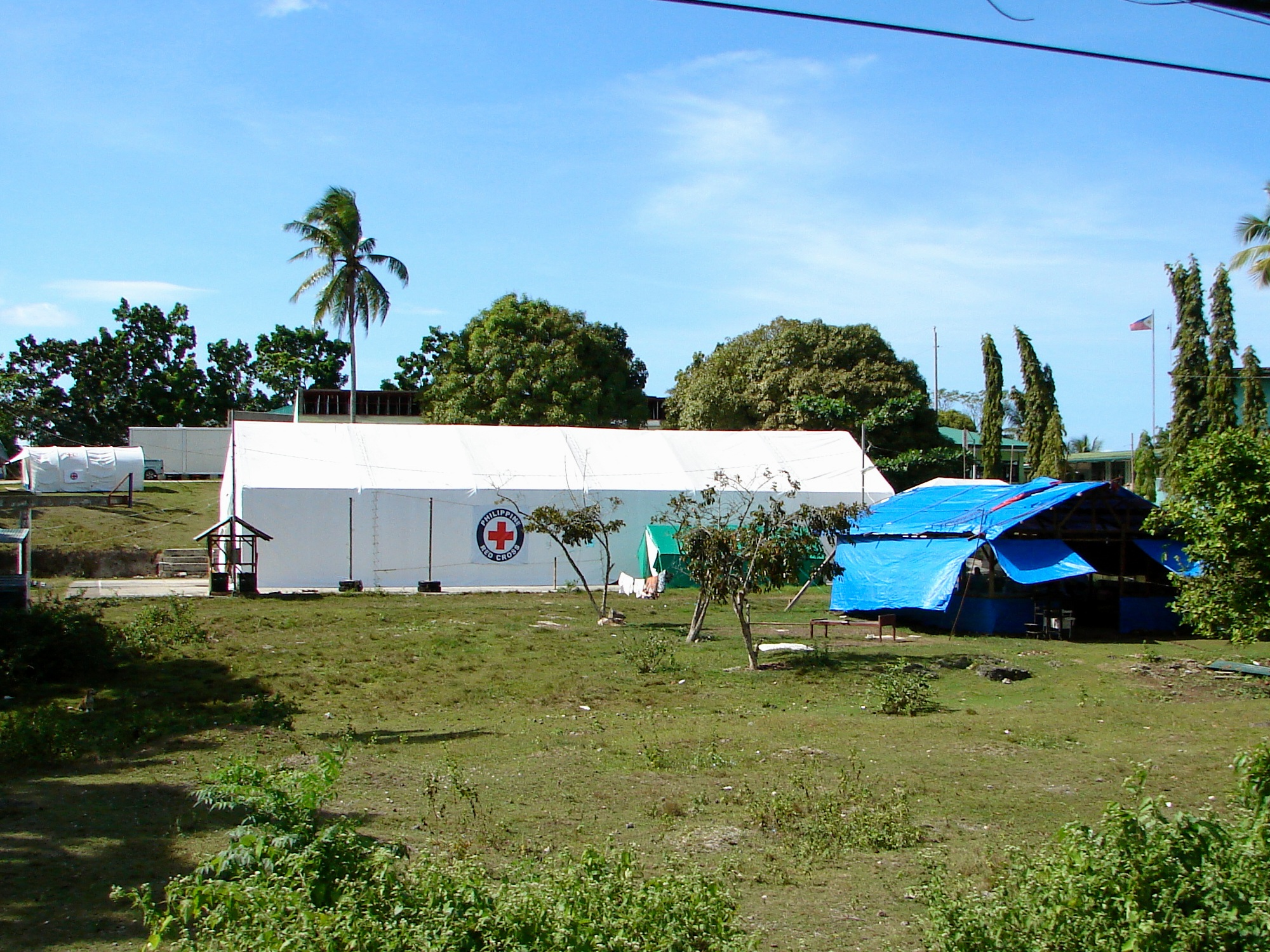
Field hospital, Loon

Many Bohol residents were left without adequate safe drinking water and sanitary facilities after the quake. Consequently, serious public health issues arose such as cases of diarrhea and water-borne diseases. Worst affected were the municipalities closest to the epicenter, such as Sagbayan, San Isidro, Calape, Tubigon, Clarin and Catigbian.

There were also threats to public health. Community health centers and hospitals were rendered useless, resulting in the use of makeshift wards outside the affected buildings. Food supply was also disrupted, with many markets unable to operate a week after the quake. Furthermore, prolonged periods of aftershocks forced the population to take residence in makeshift shelters, afraid to go inside weakened buildings, and causing psychological trauma.

=== Power and water supply ===
One in every five households in Bohol had no electricity a week after the earthquake hit. In terms of number of barangays, according to the Department of Energy, 91 percent of 602 villages had their power restored. On October 24, Tagbilaran City was the only town in the province where energy was fully restored. By November 3 nearly all electrical power had been restored.

By October 20, the water supply in 42 towns of Bohol was restored, but the towns of Calape, Cortes, Loon, Maribojoc, and Sagbayan still had a problem with their water supply.

As a result of Super Typhoon Haiyan (Yolanda), the province of Bohol suffered another round of power outages since the main source of electricity came from a power plant in Leyte which, along with transmission lines, were damaged by the storm. Massive brownouts and blackouts lasted for several weeks, even affecting the water supply. Electrical power was restored to all municipalities by November 23.

=== Postponement of 2013 barangay elections in Bohol ===
On October 16, 2013, the provincial government of Bohol asked to the Commission on Elections (COMELEC) for the postponement of the barangay elections after the province was heavily devastated by the quake. The following day, Bohol governor Edgar Chatto announced during the visit of President Benigno Aquino III that the provincial board would submit a resolution to the COMELEC postponing October 28 elections. The same day COMELEC visited the province and evaluated the safety conditions of polling centers. On October 22 COMELEC officially announced the postponement of elections in Bohol citing safety issues and the integrity of the buildings being used as polling centers. The elections in the province was rescheduled on November 25 and synchronized with the affected barangays of Zamboanga City, which was affected by the armed conflict against the Moro National Liberation Front on September 9 to 28, 2013.

== Response ==
=== Government response and aid ===
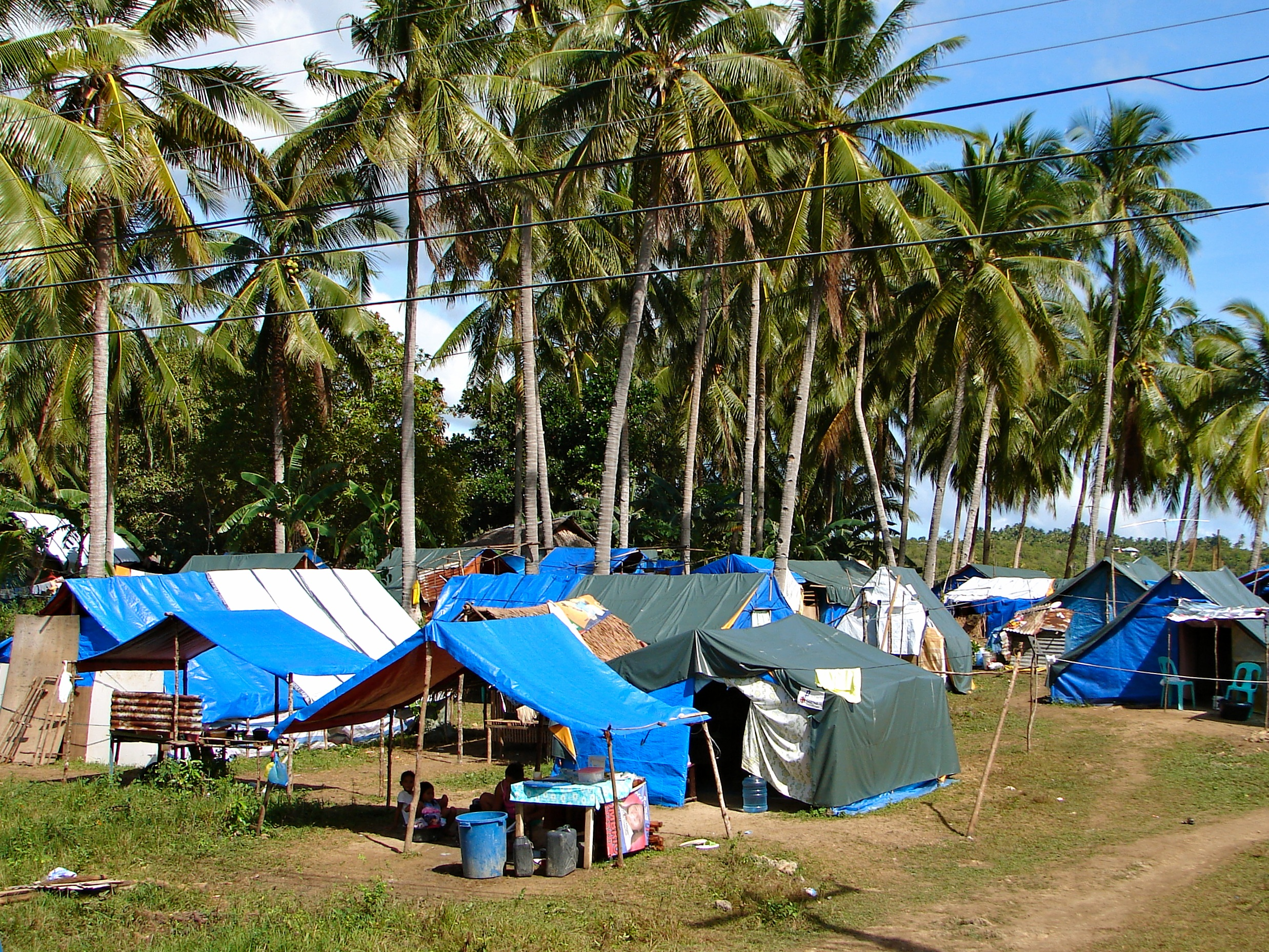
Camp of temporary shelters with displaced people in Loon

States of calamity were issued by Cebu and Bohol provincial governments on October 15. The National Commission for Culture and the Arts, National Historical Commission of the Philippines, and the National Museum expressed their commitment to rehabilitate the ten heritage churches damaged by the quake. Many of the churches destroyed are iconic and are historical landmarks. One was the Basilica Minore del Santo Niño, which is the oldest church in the Philippines. PHIVOLCS continuously monitors the geological activity of the region. The Philippine National Police declared a full alert status and deployed 271 personnel and 27 vehicles in Bohol and Cebu and has continuously monitored the effects of the earthquake. The Armed Forces of the Philippines coordinated with local governments and provincial disaster management units for updates on the situation and for damage assessments. The Department of Health placed the affected region into code red alert status. On October 16, the regional consular office of the Department of Foreign Affairs in Cebu suspended its operations in order to inspect for damage at its offices.

Philippine President Benigno Aquino III visited the provinces of Cebu and Bohol on October 16 and assessed the damage caused by the quake. Minutes upon his arrival in Tagbilaran, Bohol, a 5.1 magnitude aftershock occurred.

The Department of Social Welfare and Development released ₱10 million for the purchase of relief goods for displaced families. The department planned to distribute two thousand family packs and 100 rolls of laminated sacks that would be airlifted by the Philippine Air Force's C130. It allocated ₱98 million (US$2.2 million) in standby funds.

The city government of Davao City also pledged at least ₱3 million of cash assistance. The cities of Ormoc and Baybay, Leyte donated ₱2.1 million.

As a post-earthquake effect, several local businesses and tourist resorts had a very difficult time in the months after the earthquake, caused by fear from tourists that such event might occur again. After a year, positive signs of recovery thrived for Bohol Island amid rehabilitation efforts.

=== International response and aid ===
The Spanish government sent messages of sympathy and solidarity to the Philippine government. Spain also cited the damage and destruction of the churches, which they consider as part of their historical heritage during the Spanish colonial period. New Zealand Prime Minister John Key also sent a letter to President Aquino expressing their heartfelt sympathies to the people affected by the disaster. Canada, through Foreign Minister John Baird, also offered sympathies and stated that his country is ready to help the Philippines. Japan, through ambassador Toshinao Urabe, wrote a letter to Aquino extending the people's and government's sympathies to the quake hit victims.

Japan delivered emergency relief goods (150 tents and 485 plastic sheets) worth approximately $383,000 for the victims, and later decided to extend additional assistance of $3.5 million through the International Organization for Migration (IOM), the International Federation of Red Cross and Red Crescent Societies (IFRC), United Nations Children's Fund (UNICEF), and United Nations Development Programme (UNDP). The government of Taiwan has provided funds worth $100,000. Malaysia donated RM100,000 for the children affected by the disaster. The United States, through the US Agency for International Development (USAID), donated $50,000 worth of non-food relief items and 6,000 hygiene kits. The South Korea government donated $300,000 of funds to help rehabilitate the provinces of Bohol and Cebu. On October 21, the German government extended their sympathies to the people of the Philippines affected by the disaster. The German government also pledged ₱13.7 million that wuld be coursed through German humanitarian organization Johanniter-Unfall-Hilfe. On October 25, the Australian Government announced that it would provide ₱124 million worth of funds to the quake-hit areas for humanitarian needs. A total of ₱44 million would be provided for family survival kits containing sleeping mats, mosquito nets and water containers direct from the Philippine Red Cross, rice direct from the World Food Programme, and kits for women direct from United Nations Population Fund.

=== Aid from organizations ===
The United Nations' World Food Program prepositioned a thousand metric tons of rice, 15 metric tons of high energy biscuits and other non-food items to the affected areas in Bohol and Cebu provinces. The Association of Southeast Asian Nations' Coordinating Center for Humanitarian Assistance also delivered relief supplies to Bohol. The Philippine Red Cross (PRC) donated relief operations, and deployed volunteers and rescue teams to the depressed areas. The Singapore Red Cross (SRC) donated S$100,000 worth of relief goods, and deployed a team of volunteers in the affected areas on October 18. SRC volunteers also assisted surgeons conducting surgical operations in Tagbilaran City. On October 18, Oxfam International deployed a team of experts to assess the health and sanitation conditions in Bohol, and donated 400 water treatment solutions for distribution to various health centers in the province. On October 25, the United Nations called on the international community to raise US$46.8 million of aid for the quake-affected areas.

A 2014 report indicated that Bohol residents impacted by the quake have taken up mushroom farming, for which they are paid in rice, as part of a "Food-For-Work programme implemented in partnership with the Bureau of Fisheries and Agriculture and the Philippine Coconut Authority."

=== Other charity and fundraising activities ===
GMA Network's Kapuso Foundation and ABS-CBN's Sagip Kapamilya Foundation aided the victims of the quake by providing relief items such as food and bottled water. A benefit concert called #BangonSugBohol was also held in Cebu. Some private individuals from the least-affected Tagbilaran City mobilized and provided aid by distributing relief goods and used clothing. Different local and foreign companies also donated different relief items. Different local religious, civic, and humanitarian groups also conducted relief operations in Bohol.

== See also ==
- 2025 Cebu earthquake – Magnitude 6.9 earthquake in the Philippines
- 2017 Leyte earthquake
- List of earthquakes in 2013
- List of earthquakes in the Philippines

== Sources ==
- Kobayashi, Tomokazu (2014), "Remarkable ground uplift and reverse fault ruptures for the 2013 Bohol earthquake (Mw 7.1), Philippines, revealed by SAR pixel offset analysis" (PDF), Geoscience Letters, 1 (7), Asia Oceania Geosciences Society: 7, Bibcode:2014GSL.....1....7K, doi:10.1186/2196-4092-1-7, S2CID 55441099
