= Inabanga =

Municipality in Bohol, Philippines

- Municipality
- Municipality of Inabanga
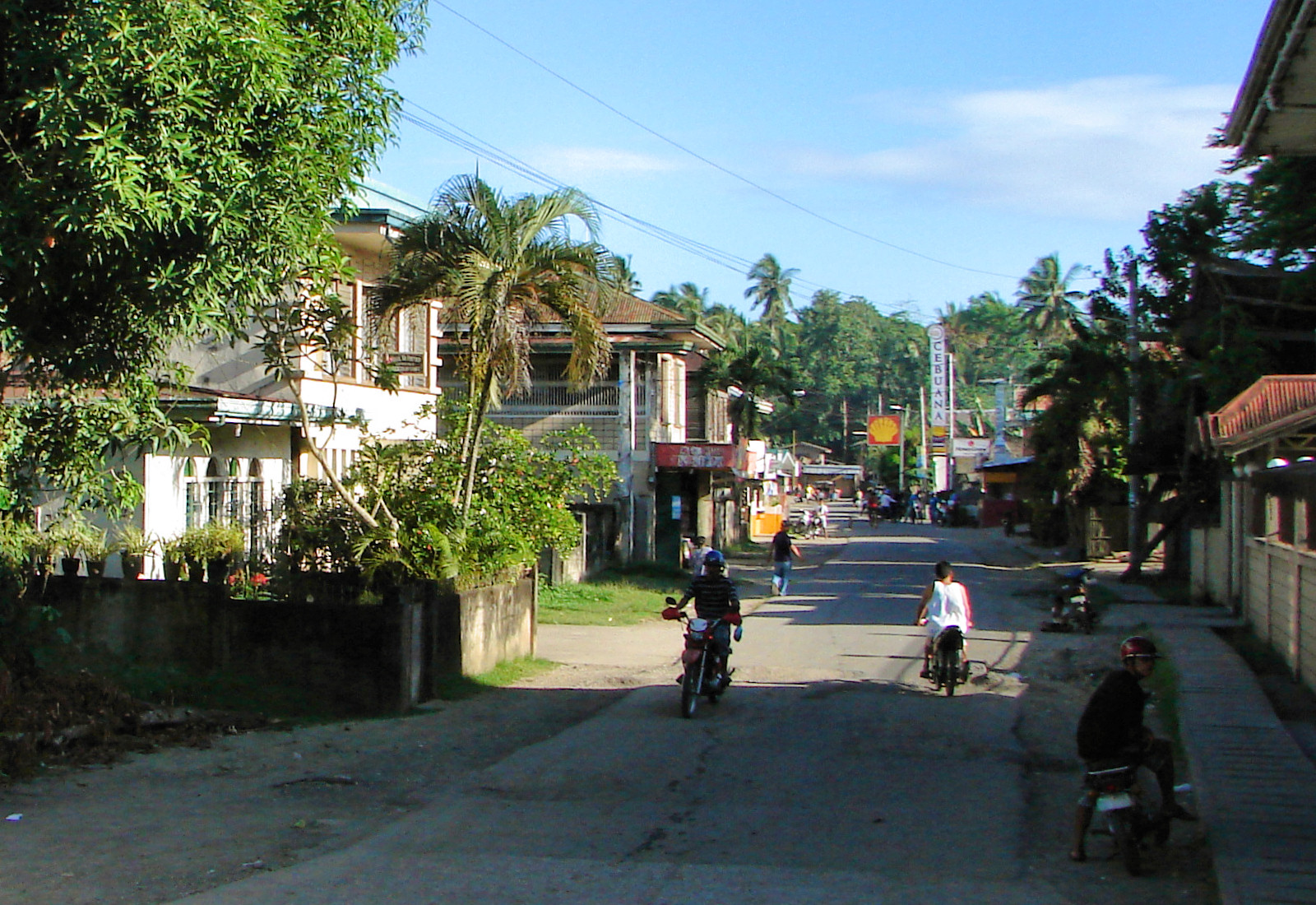

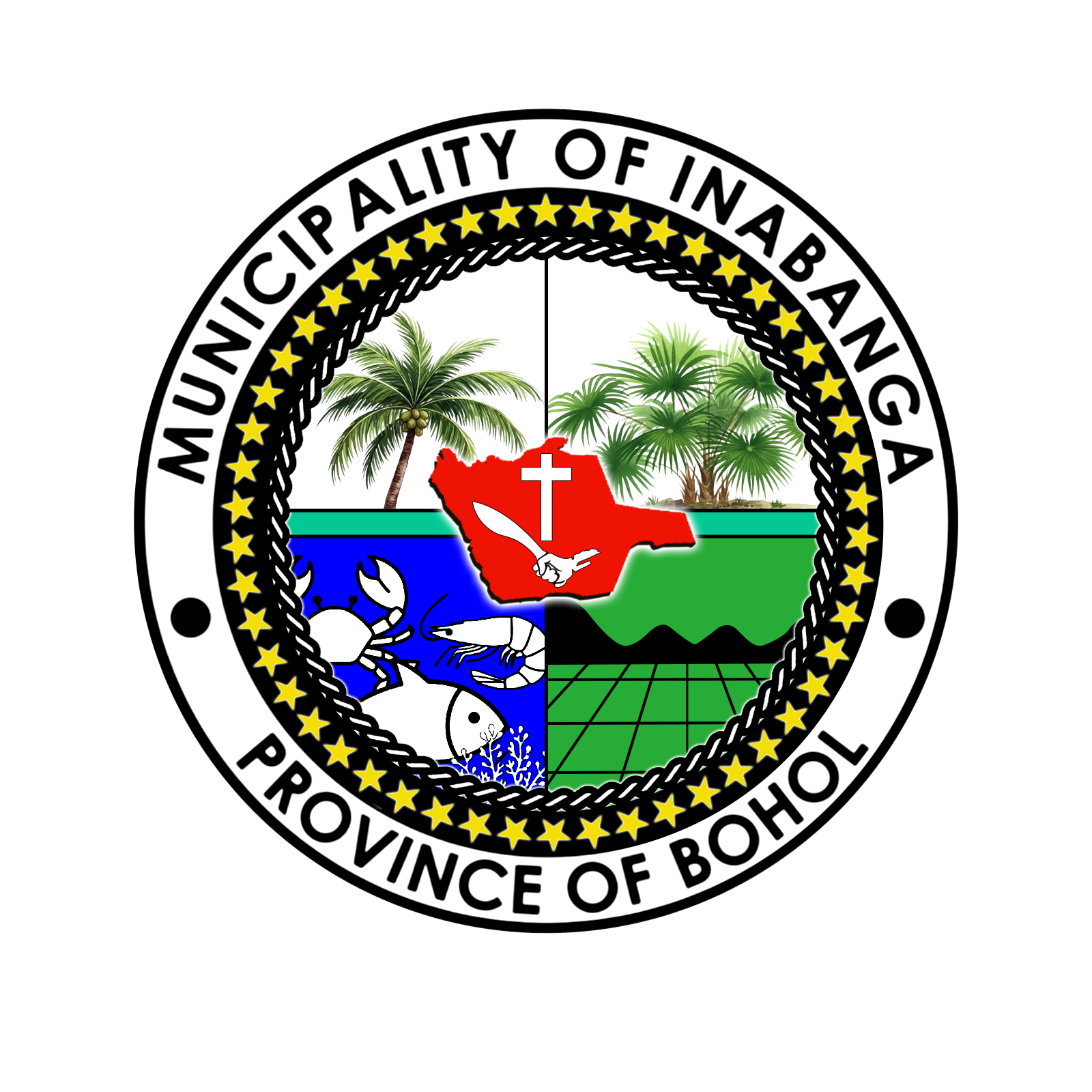
- Flag Seal

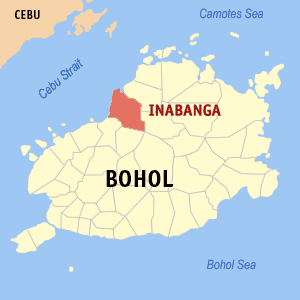
- Map of Bohol with Inabanga highlighted
- Interactive map of Inabanga
- Location within the Philippines
- Coordinates: 10°02′N 124°04′E
- Country: Philippines
- Region: Central Visayas
- Province: Bohol
- District: 2nd district
- Barangays: 50 (see Barangays)

Government
  - Type: Sangguniang Bayan
  - Mayor: Dexter M. Ancla
  - Vice Mayor: Hermogenes C. Cenabre, Jr.
  - Representative: Maria Vanessa Aumentado
  - Municipal Council: Members: Fermin E. Divinagracia; Louie Francis E. Abisado; Francis A. Celmar; Romil S. Petecio; Francis Lord P. Alesna; Kitty M. Jumao-as; Roel B. Fortich; Teodoro S. Lamorin; NB COMELEC
  - Electorate: 33,493 voters (2025)

Area
  - Total: 125.63 km^{2} (48.51 sq mi)
- Elevation: 9.0 m (29.5 ft)
- Highest elevation: 141 m (463 ft)
- Lowest elevation: −3 m (−9.8 ft)

Population (2024 census)
  - Total: 49,133
  - Density: 391.09/km^{2} (1,012.9/sq mi)
  - Households: 11,015

Economy
  - Income class: 1st municipal income class
  - Poverty incidence: 16.83% (2023)
  - Revenue: ₱ 286.8 million (2024)
  - Assets: ₱ 971.6 million (2024)
  - Expenditure: ₱ 247.9 million (2024)
  - Liabilities: ₱ 181.7 million (2024)

Service provider
  - Electricity: Bohol 1 Electric Cooperative (BOHECO 1)
- Time zone: UTC+8 (PST)
- ZIP code: 6332
- PSGC: 071224000
- IDD : area code: +63 (0)38
- Native languages: Boholano dialect Cebuano; Eskayan; Tagalog
- Website: www.inabanga.gov.ph

Inabanga, officially the Municipality of Inabanga (Cebuano: Munisipyo sa Inabanga; Tagalog: Bayan ng Inabanga), is a municipality in the province of Bohol, Philippines. According to the 2024 census, it has a population of 49,133 people.

Inabanga celebrates its fiesta on 29 and 30 June, to honor the town patron, Saint Paul. The old 1818 Spanish era census showed that it had 1,815 native families and 41 Spanish-Filipino families.

Inabanga was the site of the 2017 Bohol clashes between Philippine security forces and Moro ISIL-affiliated militants led by members of the Abu Sayyaf.

== Geography ==
Inabanga is located at the mouth of the Inabanga River, the largest river in Bohol. It is 71 kilometres (44 mi) from Tagbilaran.

Land use:

- Timberland area: 5,305 ha (13,110 acres)
- Mangrove area: 767 ha (1,900 acres)
- Alienable & Disposable (A & D): None

Soil cover:

- Bantog clay
- Inabanga clay
- Bolinao clay
- Annam clay
- Hydrosol

=== Barangays ===
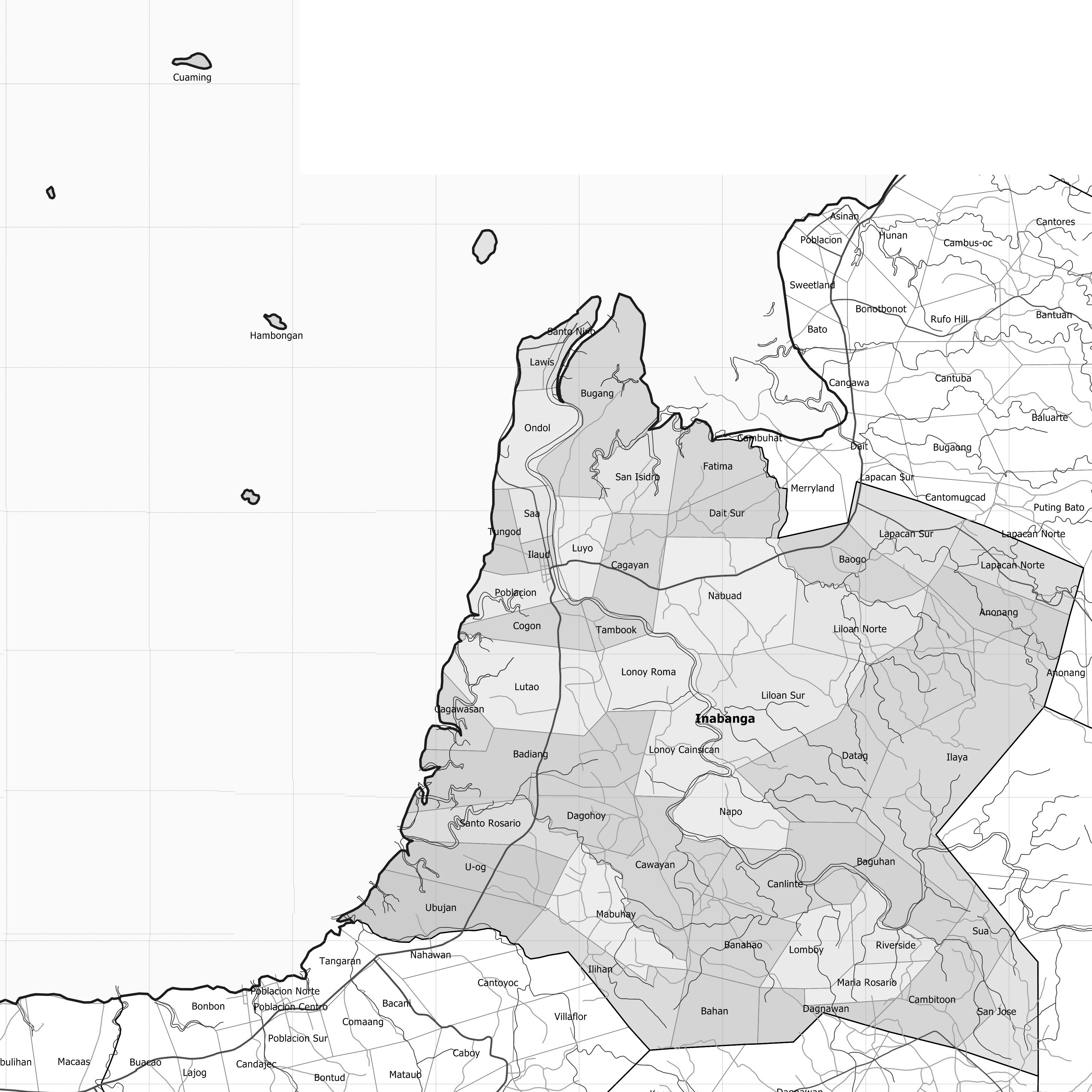
Map of Inabanga showing barangays and islands

Inabanga is politically subdivided into 50 barangays. Each barangay consists of puroks and some have sitios.

PSGC	Barangay	Population			±% p.a.	
		2024		2010		
071224001	Anonang	1.5%	748	721	▴	0.25%
071224002	Bahan	1.3%	651	464	▴	2.37%
071224003	Badiang	2.2%	1,085	1,083	▴	0.01%
071224005	Baguhan	1.0%	501	541	▾	−0.53%
071224007	Banahao	1.5%	760	652	▴	1.07%
071224008	Baogo	2.5%	1,226	1,252	▾	−0.15%
071224009	Bugang	1.6%	810	696	▴	1.05%
071224010	Cagawasan	3.0%	1,452	1,290	▴	0.82%
071224011	Cagayan	0.9%	429	390	▴	0.66%
071224012	Cambitoon	2.3%	1,132	919	▴	1.45%
071224013	Canlinte	0.6%	276	276	Steady	0.00%
071224014	Cawayan	2.0%	969	1,147	▾	−1.16%
071224015	Cogon	1.7%	820	865	▾	−0.37%
071224016	Cuaming	6.0%	2,951	2,826	▴	0.30%
071224017	Dagnawan	1.3%	630	637	▾	−0.08%
071224018	Dagohoy	3.1%	1,540	1,310	▴	1.12%
071224019	Dait Sur	1.6%	778	622	▴	1.56%
071224020	Datag	1.3%	661	559	▴	1.17%
071224021	Fatima	1.8%	861	721	▴	1.23%
071224022	Hambongan	1.4%	666	523	▴	1.69%
071224023	Ilaud (Poblacion)	1.8%	861	954	▾	−0.71%
071224024	Ilaya	0.8%	414	376	▴	0.67%
071224025	Ilihan	0.8%	414	398	▴	0.27%
071224027	Lapacan Norte	0.8%	396	350	▴	0.86%
071224028	Lapacan Sur	2.4%	1,187	1,217	▾	−0.17%
071224029	Lawis	2.6%	1,297	1,389	▾	−0.47%
071224030	Liloan Norte	3.0%	1,492	1,490	▴	0.01%
071224031	Liloan Sur	2.4%	1,165	954	▴	1.39%
071224032	Lomboy	1.2%	591	589	▴	0.02%
071224033	Lonoy Cainsican	1.4%	696	656	▴	0.41%
071224034	Lonoy Roma	1.2%	581	593	▾	−0.14%
071224035	Lutao	2.4%	1,199	1,173	▴	0.15%
071224036	Luyo	1.7%	822	732	▴	0.81%
071224037	Mabuhay	0.9%	449	383	▴	1.11%
071224038	Maria Rosario	1.6%	764	424	▴	4.16%
071224039	Nabuad	4.1%	1,998	1,804	▴	0.71%
071224040	Napo	1.5%	728	706	▴	0.21%
071224041	Ondol	2.3%	1,107	1,122	▾	−0.09%
071224042	Poblacion	2.0%	966	930	▴	0.26%
071224043	Riverside	0.5%	260	260	Steady	0.00%
071224044	Saa	1.3%	619	634	▾	−0.17%
071224045	San Isidro	1.7%	844	992	▾	−1.11%
071224046	San Jose	4.3%	2,116	1,566	▴	2.10%
071224047	Santo Niño	1.4%	686	799	▾	−1.05%
071224048	Santo Rosario	2.3%	1,117	997	▴	0.79%
071224049	Sua	1.4%	709	554	▴	1.72%
071224050	Tambook	0.9%	464	490	▾	−0.38%
071224051	Tungod	2.4%	1,184	1,089	▴	0.58%
071224052	U‑og	1.9%	957	1,112	▾	−1.03%
071224053	Ubujan	2.3%	1,111	1,064	▴	0.30%
	Total		49,133	43,291	▴	0.88%

=== Climate ===
Climate data for Inabanga, Bohol
Month	Jan	Feb	Mar	Apr	May	Jun	Jul	Aug	Sep	Oct	Nov	Dec	Year
Mean daily maximum °C (°F)	28 (82)	28 (82)	29 (84)	31 (88)	31 (88)	30 (86)	30 (86)	30 (86)	30 (86)	29 (84)	29 (84)	28 (82)	29 (85)
Mean daily minimum °C (°F)	23 (73)	23 (73)	23 (73)	23 (73)	24 (75)	24 (75)	24 (75)	24 (75)	24 (75)	24 (75)	24 (75)	23 (73)	24 (74)
Average precipitation mm (inches)	98 (3.9)	82 (3.2)	96 (3.8)	71 (2.8)	104 (4.1)	129 (5.1)	101 (4.0)	94 (3.7)	99 (3.9)	135 (5.3)	174 (6.9)	143 (5.6)	1,326 (52.3)
Average rainy days	18.0	14.1	17.1	16.8	23.7	25.7	25.8	23.3	24.2	25.9	24.0	20.6	259.2
Source: Meteoblue (modeled/calculated data, not measured locally)

== Demographics ==
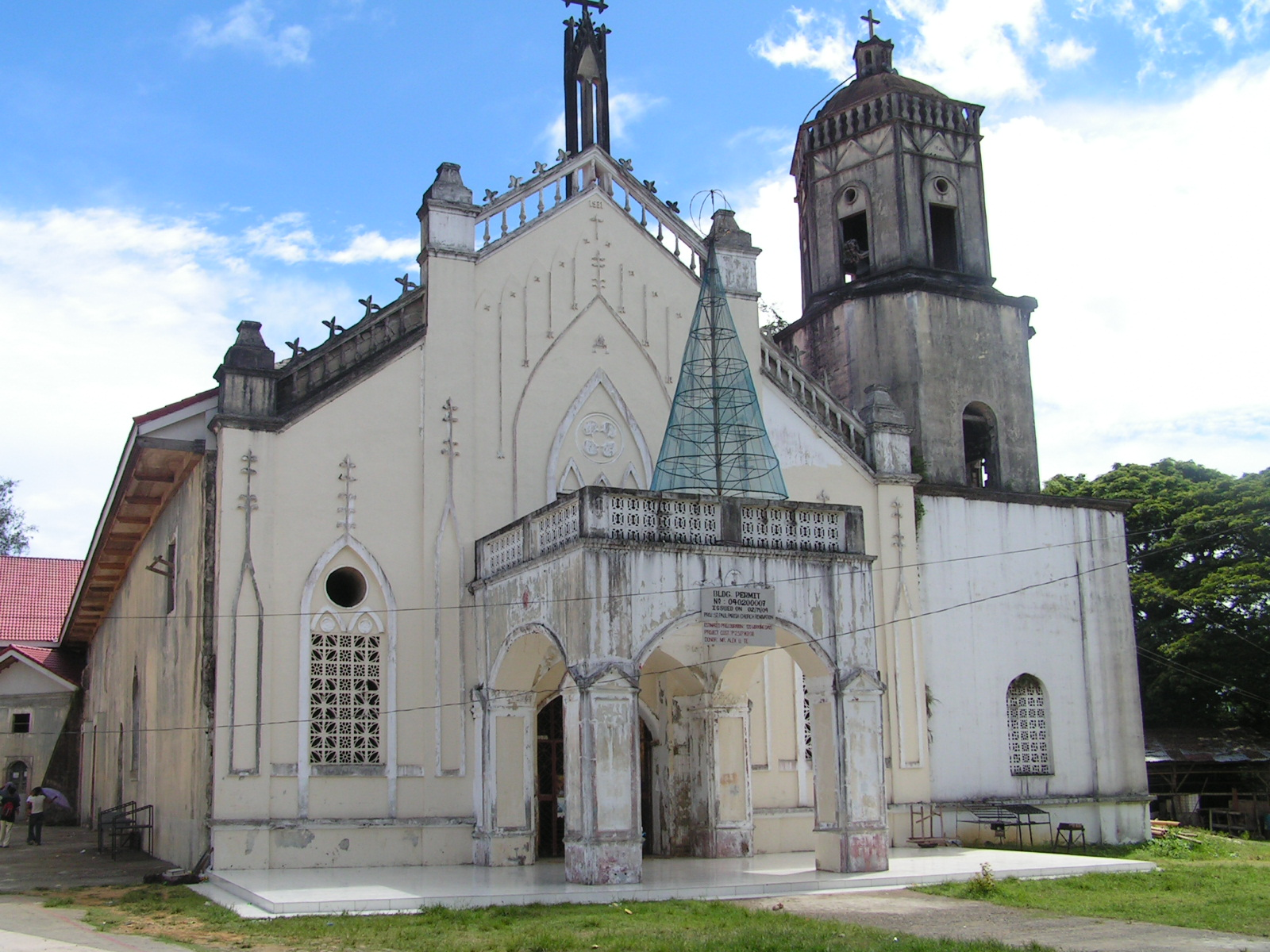
Roman Catholic Church, Inabanga

Population census of Inabanga

Year	Pop.	±% p.a.
1903	13,123	—
1918	14,210	+0.53%
1939	15,371	+0.37%
1948	16,239	+0.61%
1960	16,732	+0.25%
1970	19,618	+1.60%

Year	Pop.	±% p.a.
1975	21,895	+2.23%
1980	23,494	+1.42%
1990	26,163	+1.08%
1995	29,354	+2.18%
2000	30,643	+0.93%
2007	32,034	+0.61%

Year	Pop.	±% p.a.
2010	43,291	+11.58%
2015	45,880	+1.11%
2020	48,534	+1.19%
2024	49,133	+0.29%

Source: Philippine Statistics Authority

Predominant religion: Roman Catholic.

== Economy ==
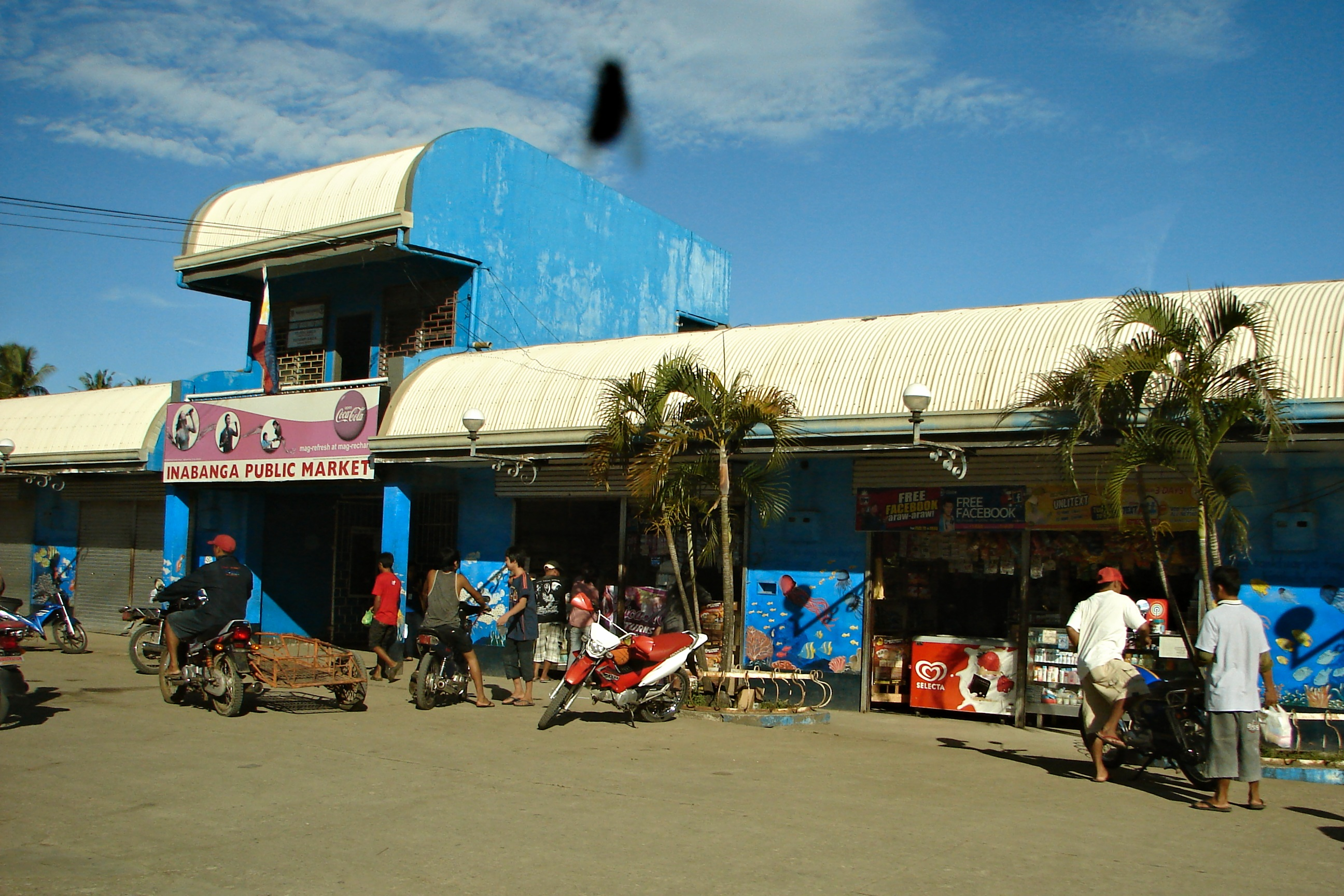
Public market

Poverty incidence of Inabanga (%)

Source: Philippine Statistics Authority

Annual income (2016): ₱114.0 million

Major industries:

- farming
- fishing
- mat weaving
- nipa thatch making

== Tourism ==
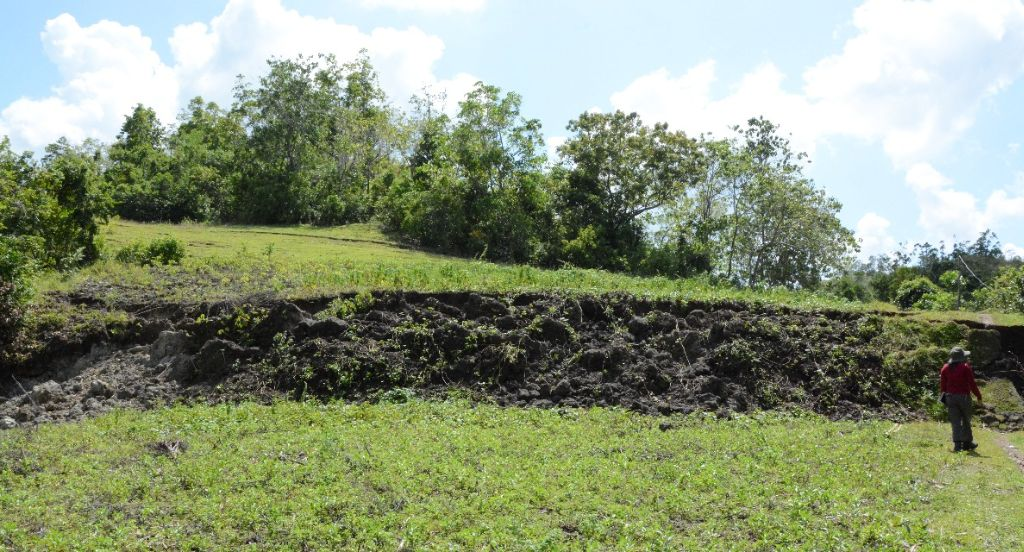
North Bohol fault, a new fault of the Bohol fault system (BFS) located in Inabang, barangay Anonang

The North Bohol fault, which appeared during the 2013 Bohol earthquake, became a tourist attraction in Bohol province.

== Infrastructure ==
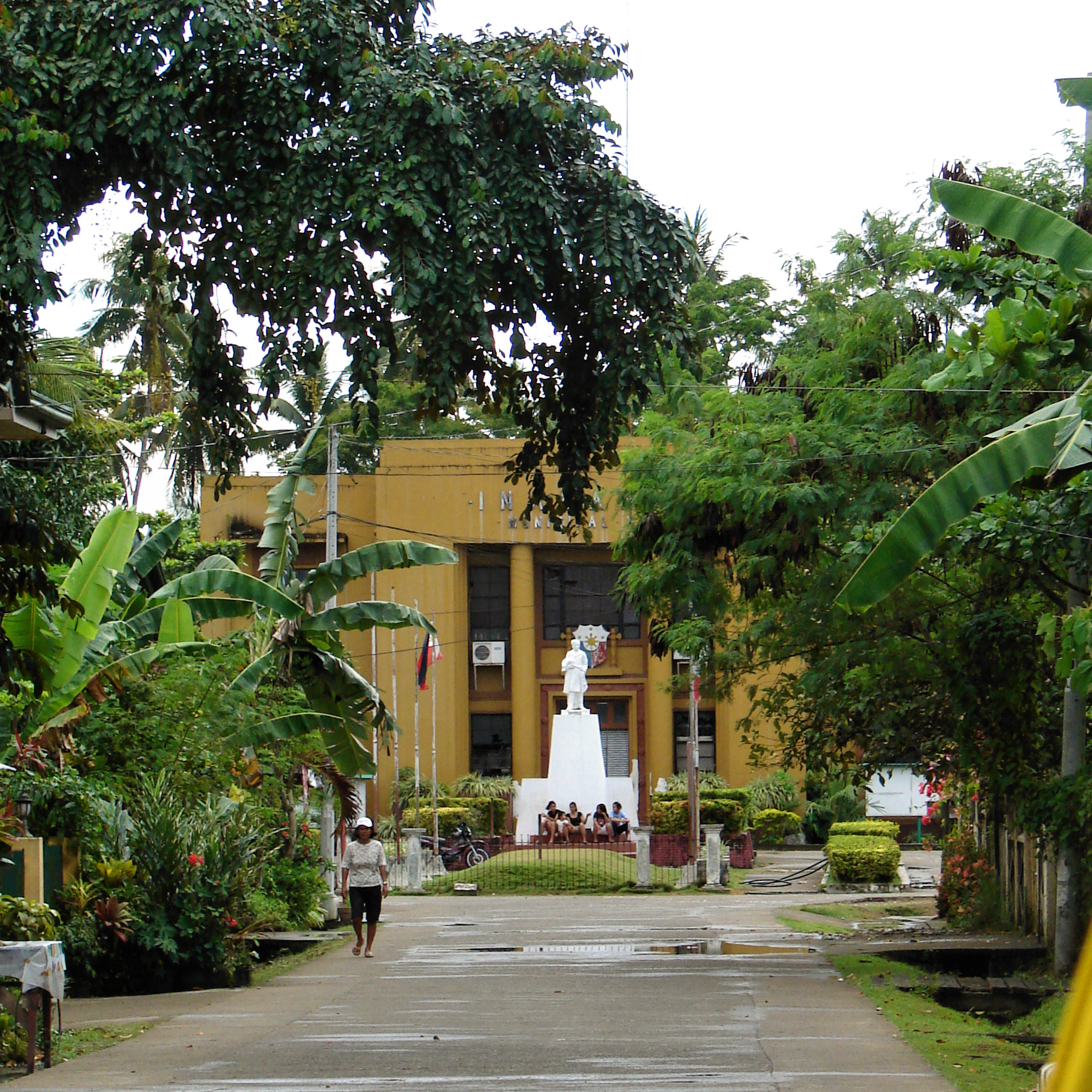
Municipal Hall Inabanga

=== Transportation ===
Total road length: 130.6 kilometres (81 mi)

Total number of bridges: 8

=== Utilities ===
Water supply:

- Main source of potable water: Groundwater
  - L1 facilities – 489 water wells
  - L2 systems in brgy Pob.
  - L3 systems serving 22 barangays
- Potable water demand (1998): 73,230 cubic metres (19,000,000 US gal; 59 acre⋅ft) per day

Energization status (2010):

- 50 barangays energized
- 8,710 actual household connections (98%)
- 8,900 potential house connections

Number of households with access to sanitary toilets: 7,686 (86%)

=== Welfare ===
- Number of Barangay Health Stations: 28
- Number of Hospitals: 1
- Number of Municipal Health Centers: 1
- Number of Day Care Centers: 50

== Education ==
Literacy rate: 92%

Tertiary education:

- Inabanga College of Arts and Sciences (INB-CAS)

Secondary and high schools:

- North:
  - Cuaming HS
  - Inabanga HS - Nabuad
  - Inabanga North Integrated School
  - San Jose NHS
- South:
  - Saint Paul's Academy
  - Dagnawan Integrated School
  - Southern Inabanga HS

Elementary and primary schools:

- North:
  - Anonang ES
  - Baogo ES
  - Cambitoon ES
  - Cuaming ES
  - Dait Sur ES
  - Datag ES
  - Hambongan ES
  - Inabanga North Integrated Sch.
  - Lawis ES
  - Liloan Norte ES
  - Liloan Sur ES
  - Nabuad ES
  - Ondol ES
  - San Isidro ES
  - San Jose ES
- South:
  - Banahao ES
  - Cagawasan ES
  - Cawayan ES
  - Dagnawaan Integrated Sch.
  - Dagohoy ES
  - Inabanga South Central ES
  - Lutao ES
  - Santo Rosario ES
  - U-og Ubujan ES

== Notable personalities ==
- Francisco Dagohoy - Filipino revolutionary leading the longest revolt in the Philippines
- Yamyam Gucong - Pinoy Big Brother: Otso Big Winner, actor and comedian
