= Buenavista, Bohol =

Municipality in Bohol, Philippines

Buenavista
- Municipality
- Municipality of Buenavista
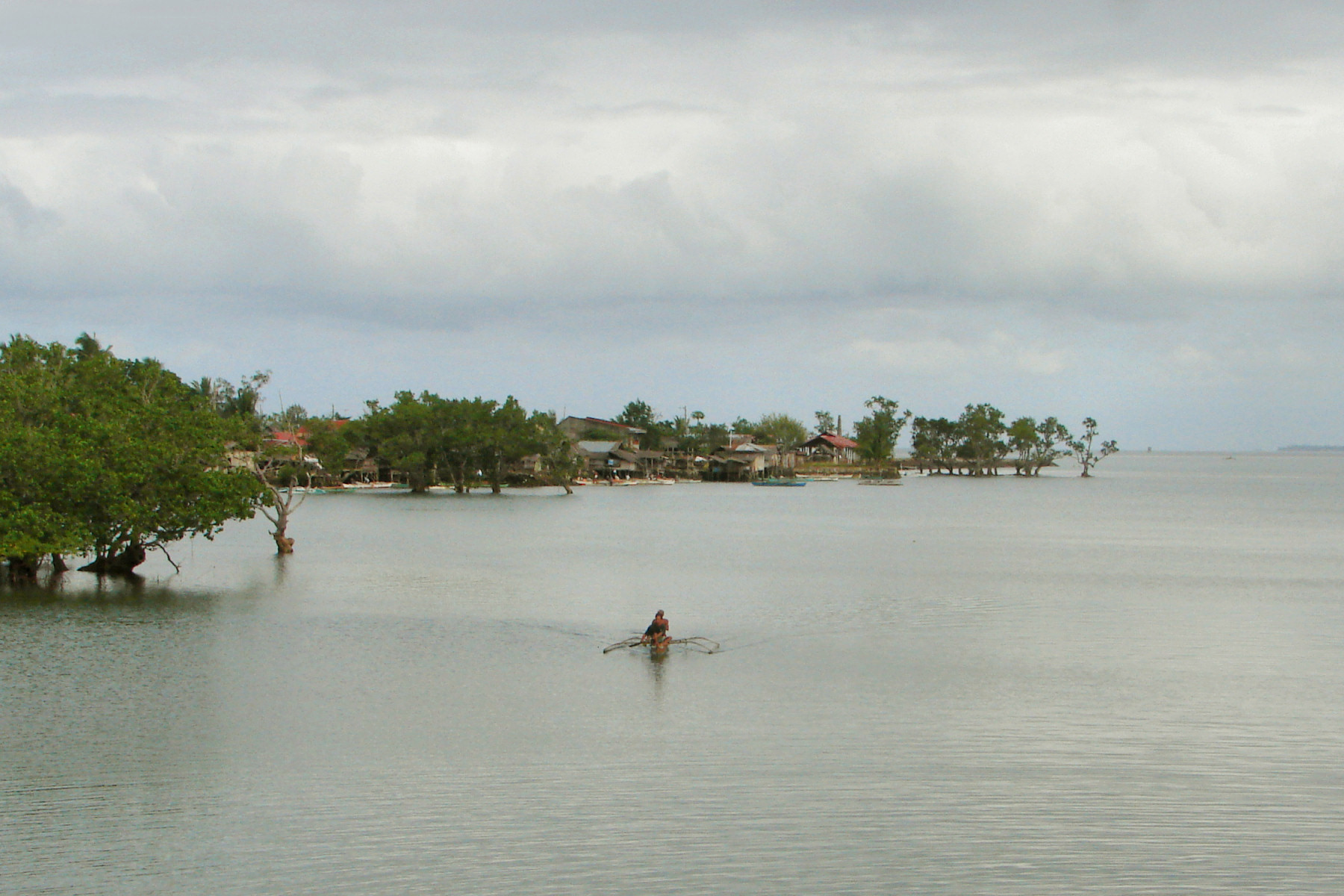
- Buenavista, Bohol

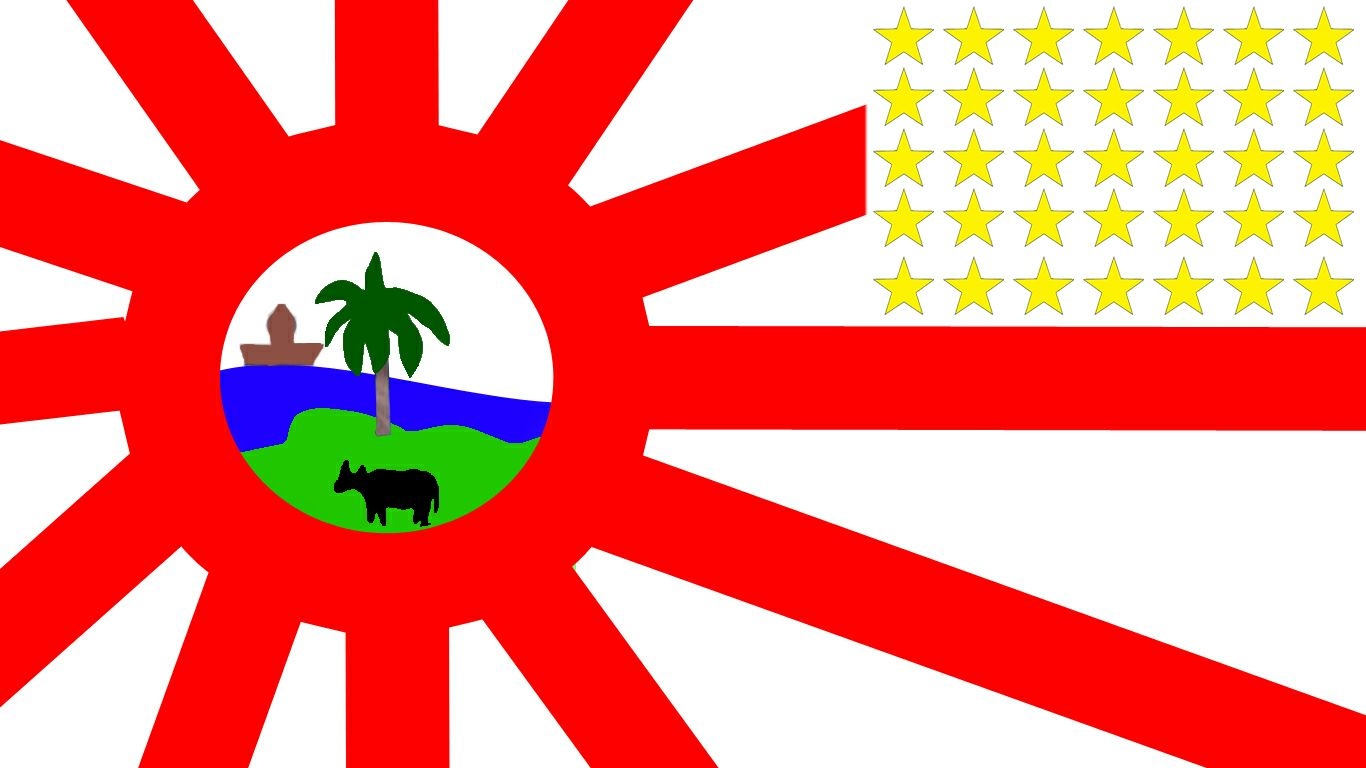
- Flag

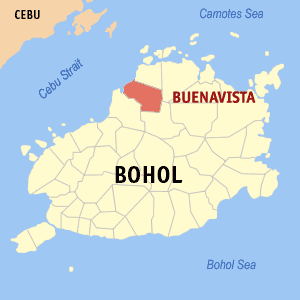
- Map of Bohol with Buenavista highlighted
- Interactive map of Buenavista
- Location within the Philippines
- Coordinates: 10°05′N 124°07′E
- Country: Philippines
- Region: Central Visayas
- Province: Bohol
- District: 2nd district
- Founded: 26 October 1959
- Barangays: 35 (see Barangays)

Government
  - Type: Sangguniang Bayan
  - Mayor: Dave D. Duallo
  - Vice Mayor: Elsa G. Tirol
  - Representative: Ma. Vanessa Cadorna-Aumentado
  - Municipal Council: Members: Phildon Lowell A. Torregosa; Ralph U. Celosia; Cristobal M. Erojo; Ho Chi P. Torregosa; Vidal E. Tampus; Alicia C. Lopez; Rey B. Celocia; Zenon H. Añora
  - Electorate: 22,943 voters (2025)

Area
  - Total: 96.00 km^{2} (37.07 sq mi)
- Elevation: 18 m (59 ft)
- Highest elevation: 173 m (568 ft)
- Lowest elevation: −3 m (−9.8 ft)

Population (2024 census)
  - Total: 31,095
  - Density: 323.9/km^{2} (838.9/sq mi)
  - Households: 6,803

Economy
  - Income class: 1st municipal income class
  - Poverty incidence: 24.34% (2023)
  - Revenue: ₱ 340.2 million (2024)
  - Assets: ₱ 704.1 million (2024)
  - Expenditure: ₱ 237.8 million (2024)
  - Liabilities: ₱ 115.3 million (2024)

Service provider
  - Electricity: Bohol 2 Electric Cooperative (BOHECO 2)
- Time zone: UTC+8 (PST)
- ZIP code: 6333
- PSGC: 071209000
- IDD : area code: +63 (0)38
- Native languages: Boholano dialect Cebuano; Tagalog

Buenavista, officially the Municipality of Buenavista (Cebuano: Munisipyo sa Buenavista; Tagalog: Bayan ng Buenavista), is a municipality in the province of Bohol, Philippines. According to the 2024 census, it has a population of 31,095 people.

Buenavista is 82 kilometres (51 mi) from Tagbilaran.

Buenavista celebrates its fiesta on October 7, to honor the town patron Santo Rosario.

== History ==
Pangpang was the original name of the place, located between the municipalities of Getafe and Inabanga. During Spanish period, Pangpang is part of Getafe in civil aspect but part of Inabanga in religious aspect. Later, it was named Buenavista which means beautiful view in Spanish, and further divided into barangay Buenavista Norte and Buenavista Sur.

On October 26, 1959, barangays of Buenavista Norte, Buenavista Sur, and Cabul-an Island, separated from Getafe to become the independent municipality of Buenavista, through Executive Order No. 362 signed by President Carlos P. Garcia.

== Geography ==
=== Barangays ===
Buenavista is politically subdivided into 35 barangays. Each barangay consists of puroks and some have sitios.

| PSGC | Barangay | Population | | | ±% p.a. | |
| | | 2024 | | 2010 | | |
|---|---|---|---|---|---|---|
| 071209001 | Anonang | 0.9% | 280 | 405 | ▾ | −2.53% |
| 071209002 | Asinan | 2.4% | 733 | 800 | ▾ | −0.61% |
| 071209003 | Bago | 1.8% | 557 | 575 | ▾ | −0.22% |
| 071209004 | Baluarte | 1.2% | 376 | 437 | ▾ | −1.04% |
| 071209005 | Bantuan | 2.0% | 632 | 659 | ▾ | −0.29% |
| 071209006 | Bato | 2.1% | 664 | 664 | Steady | 0.00% |
| 071209007 | Bonotbonot | 2.5% | 779 | 801 | ▾ | −0.19% |
| 071209008 | Bugaong | 1.4% | 449 | 489 | ▾ | −0.59% |
| 071209011 | Cambuhat | 3.6% | 1,125 | 1,045 | ▴ | 0.51% |
| 071209012 | Cambus‑oc | 2.3% | 718 | 716 | ▴ | 0.02% |
| 071209013 | Cangawa | 3.7% | 1,160 | 1,091 | ▴ | 0.43% |
| 071209014 | Cantomugcad | 0.9% | 293 | 296 | ▾ | −0.07% |
| 071209015 | Cantores | 2.0% | 624 | 570 | ▴ | 0.63% |
| 071209016 | Cantuba | 3.2% | 993 | 923 | ▴ | 0.51% |
| 071209017 | Catigbian | 2.2% | 688 | 624 | ▴ | 0.68% |
| 071209018 | Cawag | 2.0% | 623 | 668 | ▾ | −0.48% |
| 071209019 | Cruz | 2.9% | 893 | 897 | ▾ | −0.03% |
| 071209020 | Dait | 3.2% | 981 | 1,044 | ▾ | −0.43% |
| 071209021 | Eastern Cabul‑an | 6.8% | 2,100 | 1,924 | ▴ | 0.61% |
| 071209022 | Hunan | 2.6% | 816 | 882 | ▾ | −0.54% |
| 071209025 | Lapacan Norte | 1.2% | 388 | 398 | ▾ | −0.18% |
| 071209026 | Lapacan Sur | 1.7% | 530 | 479 | ▴ | 0.71% |
| 071209028 | Lubang | 3.4% | 1,044 | 1,052 | ▾ | −0.05% |
| 071209029 | Lusong (Plateau) | 2.6% | 794 | 626 | ▴ | 1.67% |
| 071209030 | Magkaya | 2.3% | 701 | 828 | ▾ | −1.15% |
| 071209031 | Merryland | 0.8% | 262 | 241 | ▴ | 0.58% |
| 071209032 | Nueva Granada | 2.2% | 694 | 549 | ▴ | 1.64% |
| 071209033 | Nueva Montana | 2.1% | 653 | 550 | ▴ | 1.20% |
| 071209034 | Overland | 2.9% | 894 | 944 | ▾ | −0.38% |
| 071209035 | Panghagban | 3.4% | 1,054 | 1,134 | ▾ | −0.51% |
| 071209036 | Poblacion | 3.0% | 923 | 859 | ▴ | 0.50% |
| 071209037 | Puting Bato | 1.7% | 540 | 556 | ▾ | −0.20% |
| 071209038 | Rufo Hill | 2.5% | 786 | 866 | ▾ | −0.67% |
| 071209039 | Sweetland | 2.3% | 725 | 714 | ▴ | 0.11% |
| 071209040 | Western Cabul‑an | 5.7% | 1,766 | 1,725 | ▴ | 0.16% |
| | Total | | 31,095 | 27,031 | ▴ | 0.98% |

=== Climate ===
Climate data for Buenavista, Bohol
| Month | Jan | Feb | Mar | Apr | May | Jun | Jul | Aug | Sep | Oct | Nov | Dec | Year |
|---|---|---|---|---|---|---|---|---|---|---|---|---|---|
| Mean daily maximum °C (°F) | 28 (82) | 28 (82) | 29 (84) | 31 (88) | 31 (88) | 30 (86) | 30 (86) | 30 (86) | 30 (86) | 29 (84) | 29 (84) | 28 (82) | 29 (85) |
| Mean daily minimum °C (°F) | 23 (73) | 23 (73) | 23 (73) | 23 (73) | 24 (75) | 24 (75) | 24 (75) | 24 (75) | 24 (75) | 24 (75) | 24 (75) | 23 (73) | 24 (74) |
| Average precipitation mm (inches) | 98 (3.9) | 82 (3.2) | 96 (3.8) | 71 (2.8) | 104 (4.1) | 129 (5.1) | 101 (4.0) | 94 (3.7) | 99 (3.9) | 135 (5.3) | 174 (6.9) | 143 (5.6) | 1,326 (52.3) |
| Average rainy days | 18.0 | 14.1 | 17.1 | 16.8 | 23.7 | 25.7 | 25.8 | 23.3 | 24.2 | 25.9 | 24.0 | 20.6 | 259.2 |
Source: Meteoblue

== Demographics ==
Population census of Buenavista
| Year | Pop. | ±% p.a. |
|---|---|---|
| 1960 | 10,992 | — |
| 1970 | 13,523 | +2.09% |
| 1975 | 15,802 | +3.17% |
| 1980 | 18,088 | +2.74% |
| 1990 | 21,665 | +1.82% |
| 1995 | 24,215 | +2.11% |
| 2000 | 25,960 | +1.50% |
| 2007 | 26,443 | +0.25% |
| 2010 | 27,031 | +0.80% |
| 2015 | 27,261 | +0.16% |
| 2020 | 29,711 | +1.83% |
| 2024 | 31,095 | +1.10% |
Source: Philippine Statistics Authority

== Economy ==
Poverty incidence of Buenavista (%)

Source: Philippine Statistics Authority

== Education ==
Secondary and high schools
  - Cabul‑an National High School
  - Cangawa National High School
  - Lubang National High School
  - Panghagban High School
  - Buenavista Municipal High School at Sweetland
Elementary and primary schools
  - Anonang Primary
  - Asinan Elementary
  - Bago Primary
  - Baluarte Primary
  - Bantuan Primary
  - Bato Primary
  - Bonotbonot Primary
  - Buenavista Central Elementary
  - Bugaong Primary
  - Cabul-an Elementary
  - Cambuhat Primary
  - Cambus-oc Primary
  - Cangawa Elementary
  - Cantores Primary
  - Cantuba Primary
  - Catigbian Primary
  - Cawag Primary
  - Dait Norte Elementary
  - Lapacan Norte Primary
  - Lubang Elementary
  - Magkaya Elementary
  - Nueva Granada Primary
  - Nueva Montana Primary
  - Overland Elementary
  - P. Tirol Elementary
  - Panghagban Elementary
  - Plateau Primary
  - Putingbato Elementary
  - Rufo Hill Elementary
Tertiary school
  - Buenavista Community College
    - Courses Offered:
      - Bachelor of Elementary Education
      - Bachelor of Secondary Education
      - BS in Computer Science
      - Associate in Hotel and Restaurant Management

== Gallery ==
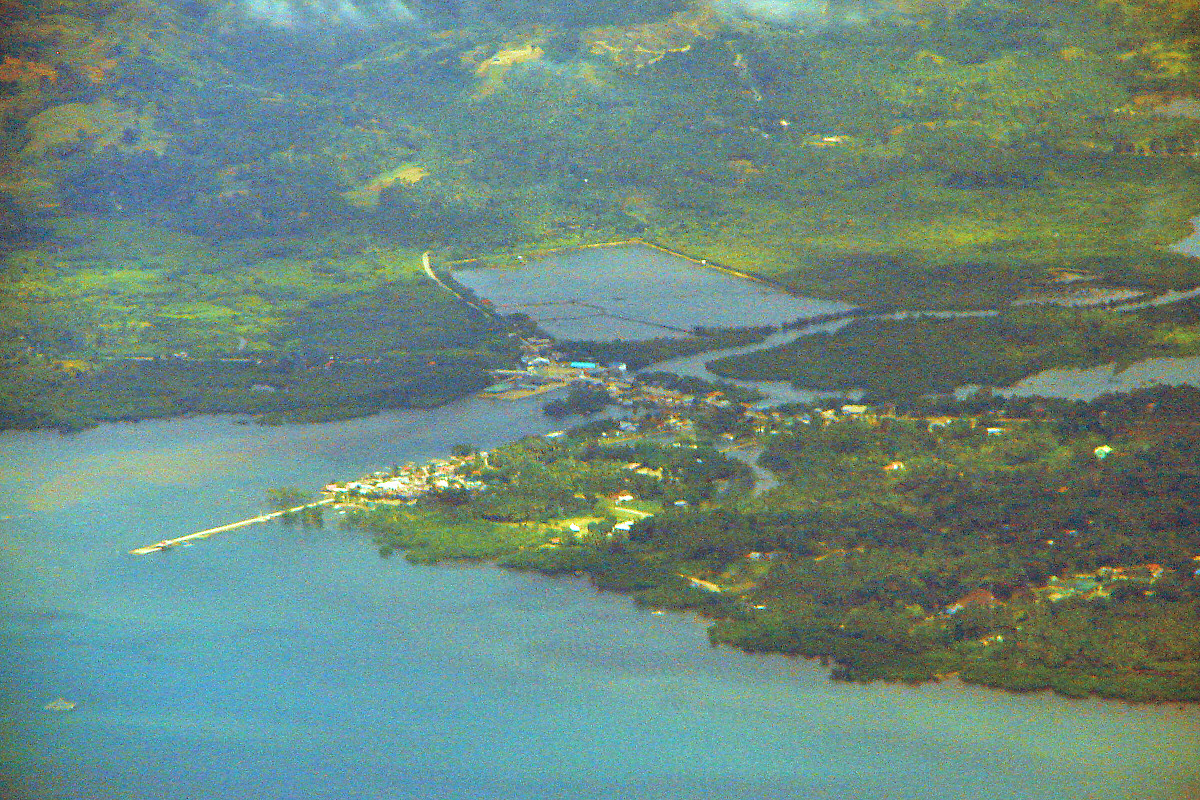
Aerial view

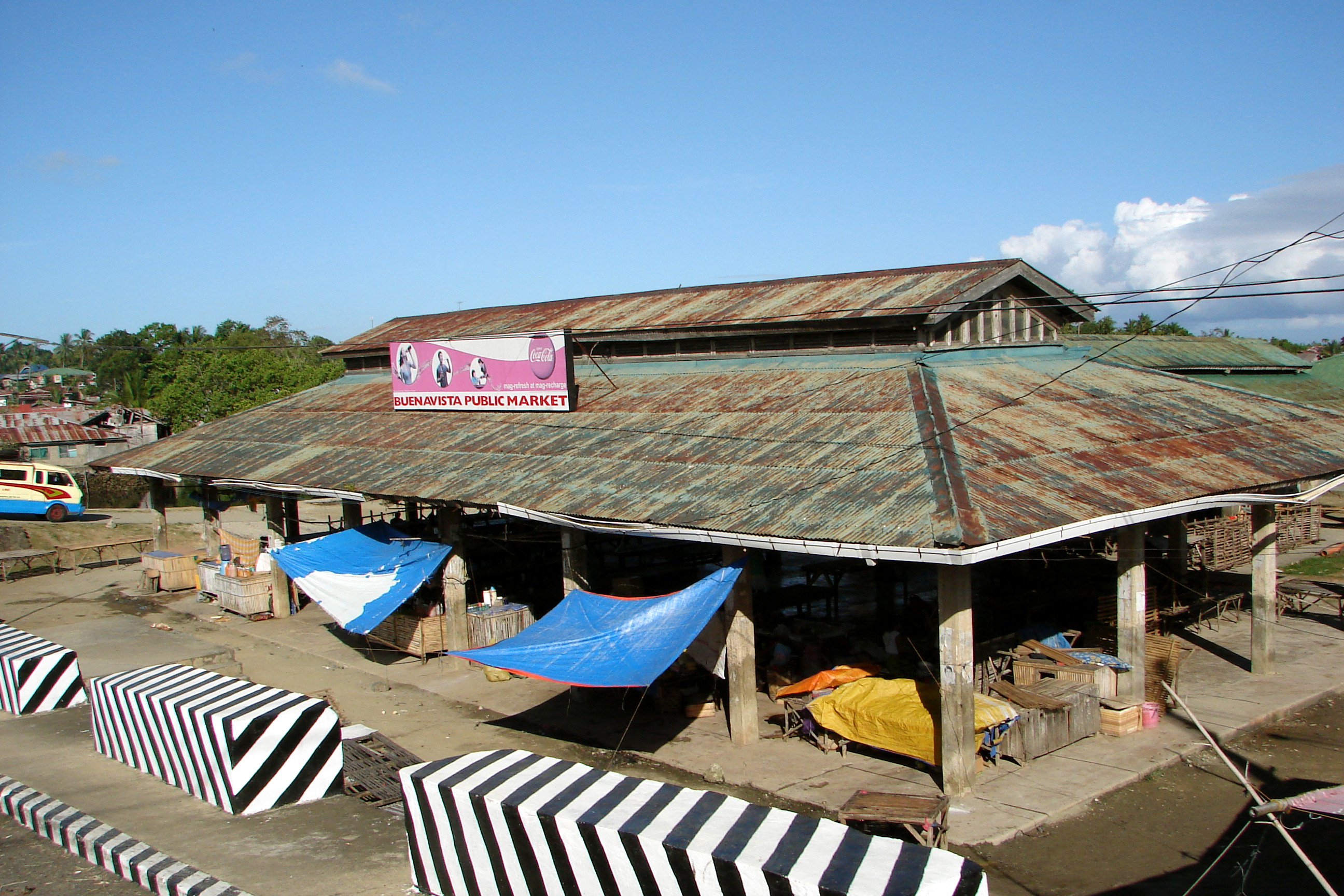
Public market

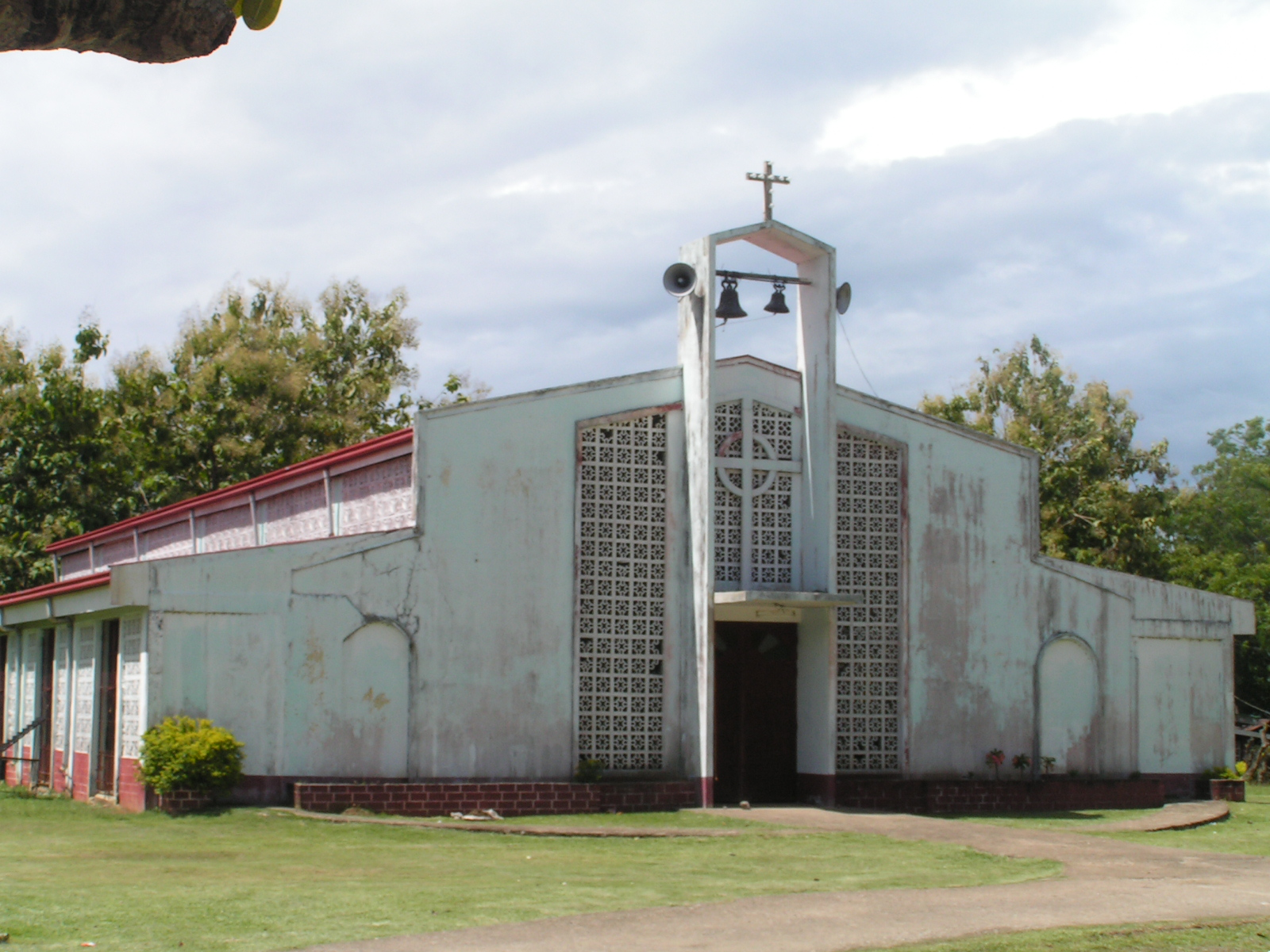
Roman Catholic Church
