= USS Stag =

United States Navy Ship

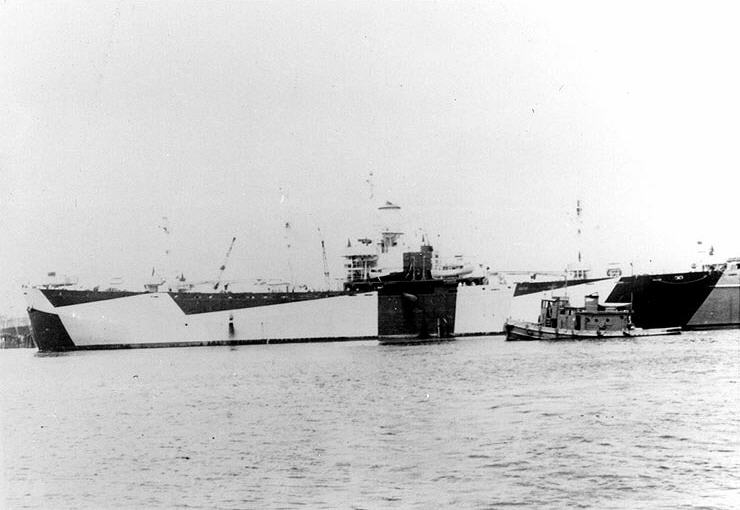
- USS Stag (AW-1) c. mid-1944, probably upon completion of conversion to a water distilling ship. She is painted in Camouflage Measure 32, Design 11F. The medium tones of this pattern are only faintly visible on the ship's forward and midships hull sides.

History

United States
- Name: USS Stag
- Builder: Delta Shipbuilding Company, New Orleans, Louisiana
- Laid down: 13 November 1943
- Launched: 7 January 1944
- Commissioned: 16 February 1944
- Decommissioned: 30 April 1946
- Stricken: 1 July 1960
- Fate: Scrapped, 1970

General characteristics
- Type: Distilling ship
- Displacement: 3,745 long tons (3,805 t) light; 14,350 long tons (14,580 t) full
- Length: 441 ft 6 in (134.57 m)
- Beam: 56 ft 11 in (17.35 m)
- Draft: 28 ft 4 in (8.64 m)
- Installed power: 2,500 hp (1,900 kW)
- Propulsion: 2 × oil-fired boilers; 1 × triple-expansion steam engine; 1 × screw
- Speed: 12 knots (22 km/h; 14 mph)
- Complement: 171 officers and enlisted
- Armament: 1 × 5"/38 caliber gun; 1 × 3"/50 caliber gun

USS Stag (AW-1) was one of four water distilling ships built for the United States Navy during World War II. The lead ship of two in her class, she was named for a ruminant mammal belonging to the family Cervidae.

Originally laid down as the SS Norman O. Pedrick on 13 November 1943 a Maritime Commission type (Z-ET1-S-C3) tanker hull (MC hull 1932) under Maritime Commission by the Delta Shipbuilding Company of New Orleans, Louisiana; launched on 7 January 1944, sponsored by Mrs. Parks B. Pedrick; acquired by the Navy from the War Shipping Administration under a bareboat charter on 16 February 1944; and commissioned the same day as the Armadillo-class tanker USS Stag (IX-128).

== Service history ==
Stag was converted from a tanker to a water distilling ship by the Tampa Shipbuilding Company in Tampa, Florida from 1 March through late July. Redesignated as USS Stag (AW-1) (date unknown), she held sea trials and shakedown off Galveston, Texas on 7 August. Twenty days later, she got underway for the Panama Canal. On 13 September, Stag stood out of the canal and proceeded independently to New Guinea. The 32-day cruise proved uneventful, and the tanker dropped anchor in Finschhafen, New Guinea, on 15 October only to receive orders to move to Hollandia that day. She arrived at Humboldt Bay on 18 October and was assigned to Service Squadron 9, Service Force, 7th Fleet. From 19 October through 21 November, she supplied fresh water to fleet units and merchantmen.

Stag sailed for the Philippines with a convoy on 22 November and arrived in San Pedro Bay, Leyte, six days later. She shuttled between there, Lingayen, Subic Bay, Mindoro, and Manila until mid-May 1945, supplying water to fleet units. On 16 May, she sailed for Morotai, Netherlands East Indies, and supplied water to units there for two months before returning to the Philippines. She continued operating in that archipelago until the end of the year when she was ordered to return, via Pearl Harbor and San Diego, to the East Coast.

Stag reported to the Commander, Atlantic Fleet, at Norfolk, Virginia on 25 February 1946 for duty and to the 5th Naval District on 5 March for disposal. She was decommissioned at Norfolk on 30 April and was struck from the Naval Vessel Register on 8 May 1946. Transferred to the Maritime Commission for lay up in the National Defense Reserve Fleet at James River, Fort Eustis, Virginia and renamed SS Norman O. Pedrick, the ship was ultimately scrapped in 1970 at Burriana, Spain.

== Vessels in the class ==
There were two vessels in the Stag-class:

- USS Stag (AW-1)
- USS Wildcat (AW-2)

== Other distilling ships ==
The other two distilling ships built during World War II were the two Pasig-class:

- USS Pasig (AW-3)
- USS Abatan (AW-4)
