= Stag-class distilling ship =

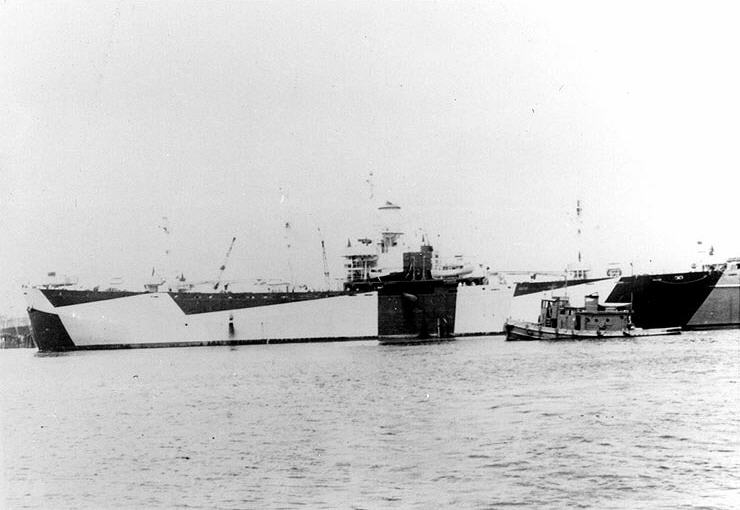
- USS Stag (AW-1) c. mid-1944, probably upon completion of conversion to a water distilling ship.

Class overview
- Name: Stag class
- Builders: Delta Shipbuilding Company, New Orleans, Louisiana
- Operators: United States Navy
- Preceded by: Armadillo-class tanker
- Completed: 2
- Retired: 2
- Scrapped: 2

General characteristics
- Type: Distilling ship
- Displacement: 3,745 long tons (3,805 t) light; 14,350 long tons (14,580 t) full
- Length: 441 ft 6 in (134.57 m)
- Beam: 56 ft 11 in (17.35 m)
- Draft: 28 ft 4 in (8.64 m)
- Installed power: 2,500 hp (1,900 kW)
- Propulsion: 2 × oil-fired boilers; 1 × triple-expansion steam engine; 1 × screw
- Speed: 12 knots (22 km/h; 14 mph)
- Complement: 171 officers and enlisted
- Armament: 1 × 5"/38 caliber gun; 1 × 3"/50 caliber gun

The Stag-class distilling ship was a class of two US Navy distilling ships that saw service in World War II. These ships were typically stationed at forward bases during conflict where they supported on-the-ground troops and front line naval units, converting salt water into fresh water.

== Ships ==
- USS Stag, lead ship in class, launched January 1944
- USS Wildcat, also launched January 1944
