= Abatan River =

River in Bohol, Philippines

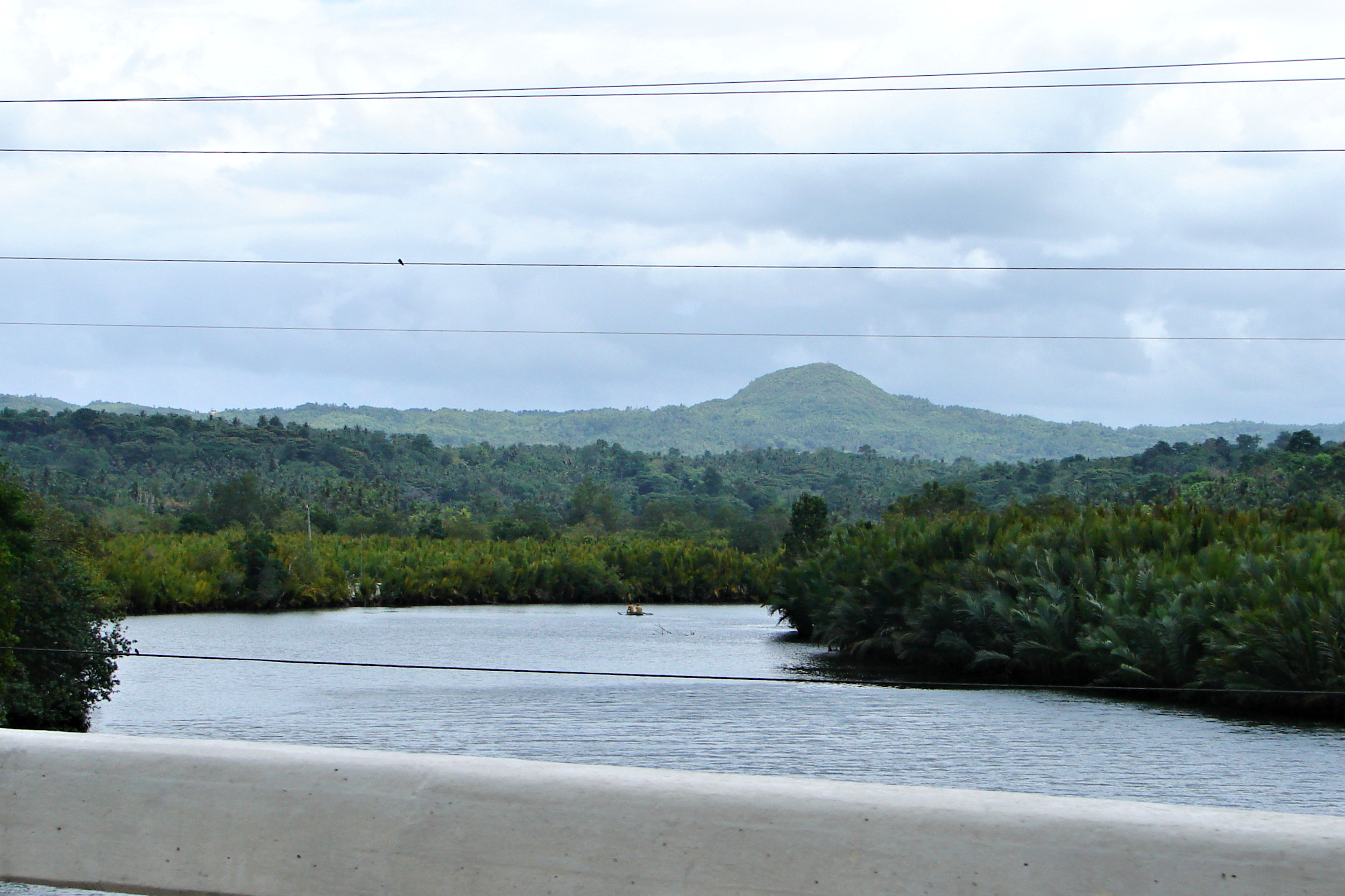
- Abatan River upstream

- Location within Visayas Location within Philippines

Location
- Country: Philippines
- Region: Central Visayas
- Province: Bohol

Physical characteristics
- Mouth: Maribojoc Bay (Cebu Strait)
  - location: Cortes
  - coordinates: 9°42′50″N 123°51′40″E
- Basin size: 350 km^{2} (140 sq mi)

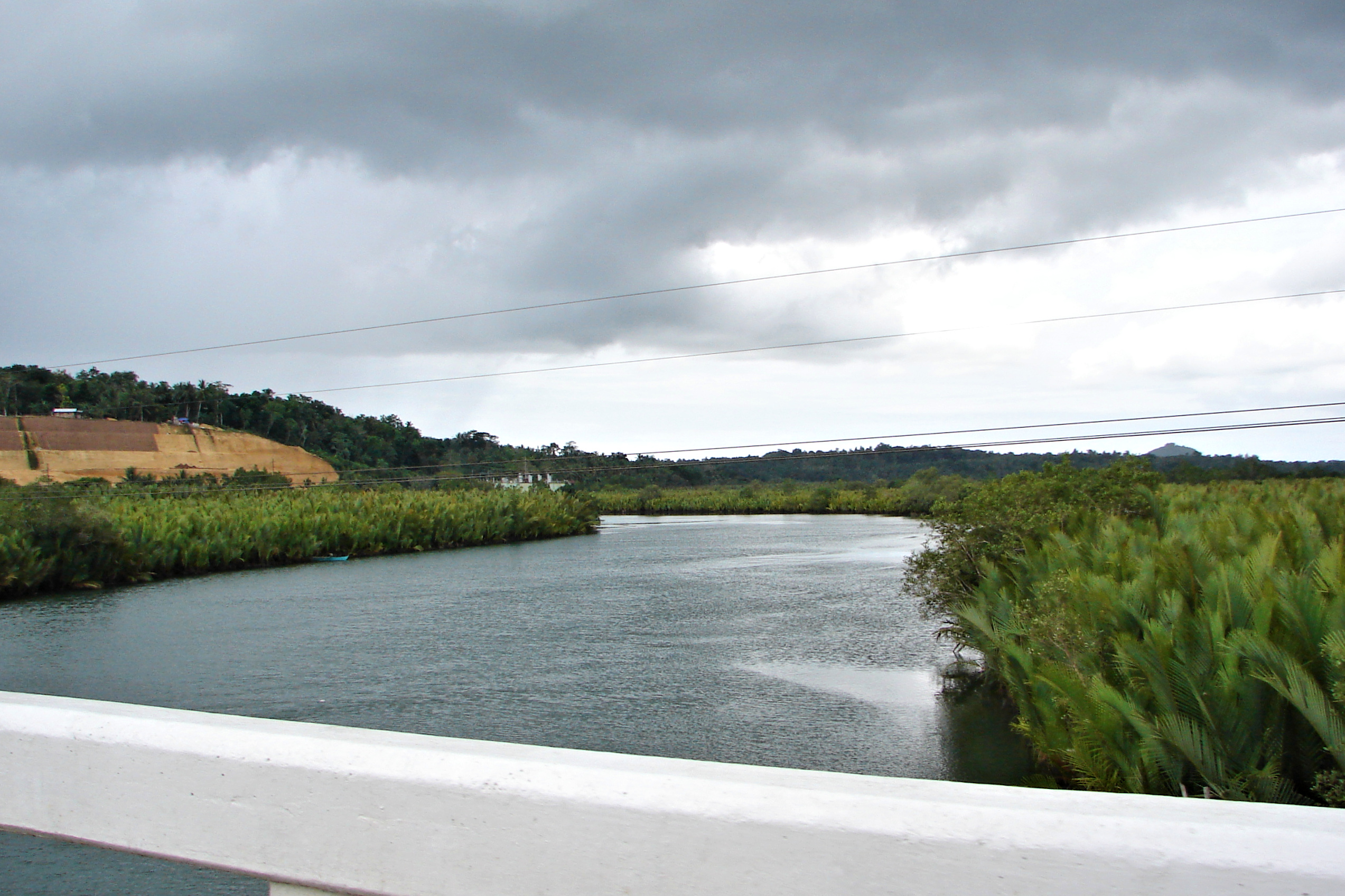
Abatan River looking downstream towards the mangrove estuary

The Abatan River is a river in western Bohol, Philippines. The river winds through the towns of Catigbian, Antequera, Balilihan, and Maribojoc to its mouth at Cortes.

The river is navigable for up to 19 kilometres (12 mi) for boats drawing 4 ft, and up to 25 kilometres (15.5 mi) for rafts. Its name comes from the word abad which means to meet or to converge.

At its mouth, the river opens up to an estuary, which consists of a mixed mangrove and nipa swamp. It covers about 1,000 acres (400 ha) and has 32 mangrove species growing in its estuary; as a result, it is one of the Philippines' most diverse mangrove forests and is the third largest riverine mangrove forest in Bohol; despite the presence of endangered plant and animal species, there are no conservation or protection efforts.

Historically prior to road construction, the river served as a waterway for the people going to and from the interior towns. Following the success of the Loboc River tours, there are river cruises from the Abatan River Visitor Center in Cortes to various communities upstream. Kayak exploration and stand-up paddle boarding are also available. The visitor center suffered severe damage from the 2013 Bohol earthquake.

During World War II, a ship in the United States Navy was commissioned: USS Abatan (AW-4), a Pasig-class distilling ship, was named after the river.

== Flora and fauna ==
The river basin is home to 273 plant species and 67 species of wild animals, as well as 8 species of fireflies, including Pteroptyx macdermotti which is very rare and endemic to the Philippines. The mangrove species Camptostemon philippinense (locally known as Gapas-gapas) is globally endangered and the rarest mangrove species in the Philippines.

The Abatan River estuary is home to the following true mangrove species (with local names in parentheses):

- Acanthus ebracteatus (Diluario)
- Acanthus volubilis
- Acrostichum aureum (Lagolo)
- Acrostichum speciosum (Paku laot)
- Aegiceras corniculatum (Saging-saging)
- Avicennia marina (Bungalon)
- Avicennia officinalis (Api-api)
- Avicennia rumphiana (Piapi)
- Bruguiera gymnorhiza (Busain)
- Bruguiera parviflora (Langarai)
- Bruguiera sexangula (Pototan)
- Camptostemon philippinense (Gapas-gapas)
- Ceriops tagal (Tangal or Tungog)
- Ceriops zippeliana
- Cynometra iripa
- Dolichandrone spathacea (Tuwi)
- Excoecaria agallocha (Alipata or Buta-buta)
- Heritiera littoralis (Dungon late)
- Lumnitzera littorea (Tabau)
- Lumnitzera racemosa (Kulasi)
- Nypa fruticans (Nipa)
- Osbornia octodonta (Taualis)
- Rhizophora apiculata (Bakauan lalaki)
- Rhizophora mucronata (Bakauan babae)
- Rhizophora stylosa (Bakauan bato)
- Scyphiphora hydrophylacea (Nilad or Sagasa)
- Sonneratia alba (Pagatpat)
- Xylocarpus granatum (Tabigi)
- Xylocarpus moluccensis (Piagau)

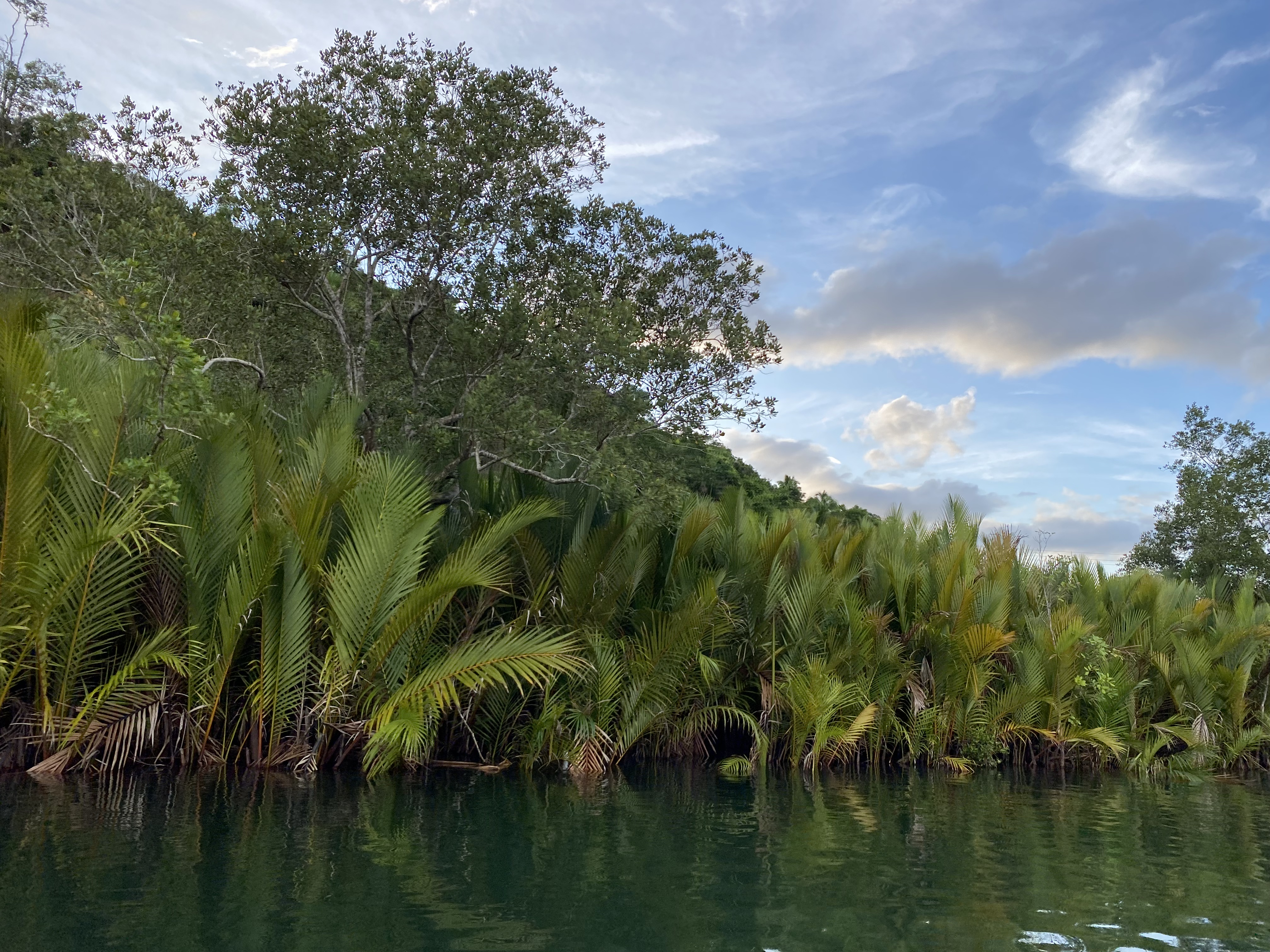
Mangroves of the Abatan River at Maribojoc

Animal varieties include mudskippers, rats, fruit bats like the Large flying fox (Pteropus vampyrus), lizards like the mangrove skink (Emoia atrocostata) and water monitor (Varanus salvator), as well as ants, spiders and fiddler crabs. Snake species include the King cobra (Ophiophagus hannah), which is locally known as Banakon, Samar cobra (Naja samarensis), locally known as Ugahipon, and the Philippine whipsnake, locally known as Hanlulukay (Dryophiops philippina). A new species of rock-eating shipworm (Lithoredo abatanicus) was identified in the river in June 2019, locally known as Antingaw.

== See also ==
Other significant rivers in Bohol:

- Inabanga River
- Loboc River
