= USS Wildcat (AW-2) =

Stag-class distilling ship

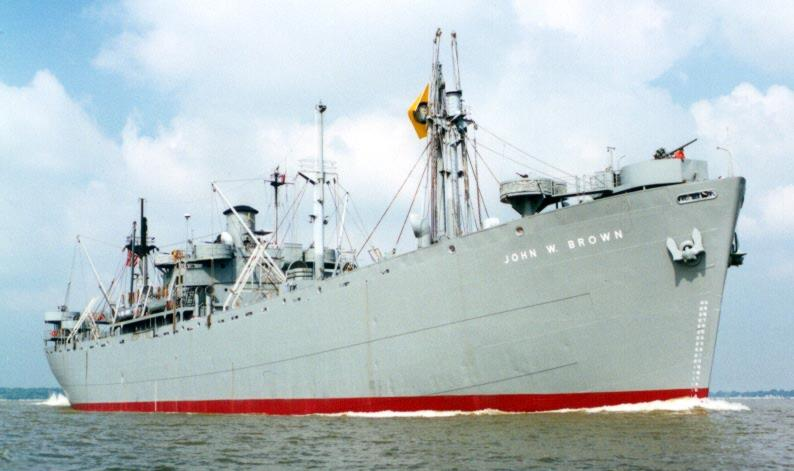
- Wildcat was a tanker variant liberty ship, similar to SS John W. Brown, seen here.

History

United States
- Name: USS Wildcat
- Builder: Delta Shipbuilding Company, New Orleans, Louisiana
- Laid down: 16 November 1943
- Launched: 7 January 1944
- Commissioned: 17 February 1944
- Decommissioned: 17 January 1947
- Stricken: 10 June 1947
- Fate: Scrapped, 1970

General characteristics
- Type: Distilling ship
- Displacement: 3,745 long tons (3,805 t) light; 14,350 long tons (14,580 t) full
- Length: 441 ft 6 in (134.57 m)
- Beam: 57 ft (17 m)
- Draft: 27 ft 9 in (8.46 m)
- Propulsion: Reciprocating steam engine, single propeller
- Speed: 12 knots (22 km/h; 14 mph)
- Complement: 148 officers and enlisted
- Armament: 1 × 5"/38 caliber gun; 1 × 3"/50 caliber gun; 12 × 20 mm cannon

USS Wildcat (AW-2), was a Stag-class distilling ship, built for the United States Navy during World War II, the only U.S. Naval vessel to be named for Felis silvestris.

Originally projected as the Liberty ship tanker SS Leon Godchaux; however, before her construction began, the ship was allocated to the Navy as an Armadillo-class tanker. She was classified as IX-130, an unclassified miscellaneous vessel, and renamed Wildcat on 27 October 1943 and acquired by the Navy under a bareboat charter from the War Shipping Administration. Her keel was laid down under a Maritime Commission contract (Z-ET1-S-C3, MCE hull 1934) on 16 November 1943 at New Orleans, Louisiana, by the Delta Shipbuilding Company. She was launched on 7 January 1944 sponsored by Mrs. Leonie Godchaux Mayer, reclassified AW-2 on 4 February 1944, delivered to the Navy at New Orleans on 16 February, and commissioned as the Stag-class USS Wildcat (AW-2) the following day, 17 February 1944.

Soon thereafter, the ship was shifted to Tampa, Florida, for hull alterations by the Tampa Shipbuilding Company, and was decommissioned at Key West, Florida, on 10 April 1944. At the naval operating base there, Wildcat underwent the balance of the conversion from tanker to water distilling ship into the autumn of 1944. She recommissioned at Key West on 15 October 1944.

== Service history ==
Wildcat conducted shakedown training in the Gulf of Mexico before she underwent post-shakedown alterations at the Todd Shipbuilding Company in Galveston, Texas. Wildcat departed Galveston on 5 December, bound via the Panama Canal Zone for the western Pacific. She transited the canal and at Balboa underwent minor repairs from 11 to 21 December to her engineering plant before she got underway on the latter day for the Admiralty Islands. She made port at Manus on 23 January 1945 and, two days later, shifted to Humboldt Bay, New Guinea. Attached to Service Squadron 9, 7th Fleet, Wildcat soon sailed in convoy for the Philippines and, on 6 February, dropped anchor in Leyte Gulf, off the municipality of Dulag, on the eastern coast of Leyte. Two days later, the ship moved to San Pedro Bay, Leyte, where she remained into April, distilling and issuing fresh potable water to small craft and merchant vessels.

She received a tender availability alongside the Whitney (AD-4) from 11 to 18 April before shifting to Calicoan Island to transfer her deck cargo to SS Ben Ruffin. Wildcat then returned to San Pedro Bay on 23 April to resume her water distilling and issuing duties there. Wildcat got underway for Manila on the morning of 25 April, but grounded on a pinnacle near the approach channel to San Pedro Bay at 0855. After she was refloated, she proceeded to Manicani Island, Samar, where she was dry-docked in ABSD-5 on 31 May for repairs to her damaged hull. She remained there until 4 July, when she shifted to YFD-21 for the remainder of the repairs. Upon completion of that hull work, Wildcat undocked on 19 July, headed for Manila on 24 July, and arrived on 26 July to assume duties there as station ship.

Anchored in Manila Bay when news of Japan's final capitulation came on V-J Day (15 August 1945), Wildcat's sailors witnessed the "riotous celebrations, skyrockets and light displays" which accompanied that welcome news. Wildcat later moved to Subic Bay, Luzon, but returned to Manila on 5 September to resume distilling and distributing potable water to the various ships and small craft. The distilling ship remained in Philippine waters through the autumn of 1945 and headed home to the United States in December. Wildcat was slated to be returned to the War Shipping Administration for disposal at Norfolk, Virginia, in mid-1946, but the ship was retained for use in Operation Crossroads, the atomic bomb tests at Bikini Atoll. Wildcat subsequently performed support tasks with Joint Task Force 1 in the summer of 1946. Declared "radiologically cleared," (free from radioactive contamination) the distilling ship was released from "Crossroads" on 11 September 1946.

Decommissioned at the 13th Naval District on 17 January 1947 and returned to the War Shipping Administration that day, the erstwhile water distilling ship was struck from the Naval Vessel Register on 10 June 1947. She was laid up at Olympia, Washington, with the National Defense Reserve Fleet. Wildcat was eventually broken up for scrap sometime in the mid-1970s.
