= USS Abatan =

Distilling ship in the US Navy

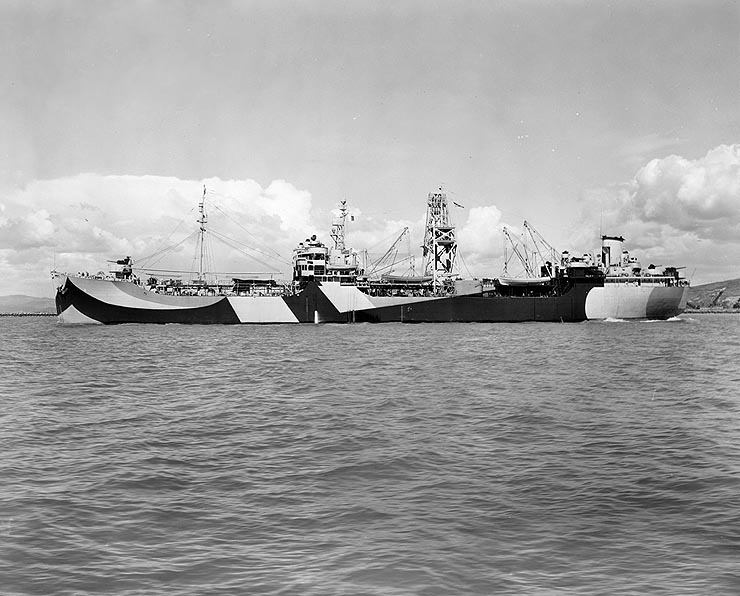
- Abatan at Mare Island Navy Yard in 1945. Her camouflage scheme is Measure 32, Design 7AO.

History

United States
- Name: USS Abatan
- Builder: Marinship Corporation, Sausalito, California
- Laid down: 9 June 1944
- Launched: 6 August 1944
- Commissioned: 29 January 1945
- Decommissioned: 27 January 1947
- Stricken: 1 July 1960
- Reinstated: 27 September 1962
- In service: 1962
- Out of service: 1979
- Stricken: 1 May 1970
- Fate: Sunk as a target, 1980

General characteristics
- Type: Pasig-class distilling ship
- Displacement: 6,640 long tons (6,747 t) light; 23,350 long tons (23,725 t) full
- Length: 523 ft 6 in (159.56 m)
- Beam: 68 ft (21 m)
- Draft: 30 ft 10 in (9.40 m)
- Propulsion: Turbo-electric, single propeller
- Speed: 15.1 knots (28.0 km/h; 17.4 mph)
- Complement: 265 officers and enlisted
- Armament: 1 × 5-inch/38-caliber gun; 4 × 3-inch/50-caliber guns; 4 × twin 40 mm guns; 4 × twin 20 mm guns

USS Abatan (AW-4) was a Pasig-class distilling ship built for the United States Navy during World War II, named after the Abatan River located in the southwestern part of Bohol Island in the Philippines.

Originally laid down as SS Mission San Lorenzo under a United States Maritime Commission contract on 9 June 1944 at Sausalito, California by the Marinship Corporation, she was renamed USS Abatan on 25 July 1944 in anticipation of her acquisition by the Navy and simultaneously designated AO-92 for naval service as an oiler, launched on 6 August 1944, sponsored by Mrs. John A. McCone, transferred to the Navy on 28 November 1944 at the Mare Island Navy Yard, Vallejo, California, converted there for naval service, completed as a distilling ship, redesignated USS Abatan (AW-4) on 24 August 1944 and placed in commission on 29 January 1945.

== Service history ==
=== World War II, 1945 ===
Late in February, the new distilling ship got underway for shakedown training off the coast of southern California. She left the continental United States on the 28th and shaped a course for the Western Caroline Islands. After pausing en route at Eniwetok, Abatan reached Ulithi on 21 March and remained there for more than six months providing potable water to various types of landing craft, patrol vessels, and escort ships. During this period of her service, Japan capitulated in mid-August.

=== Post-war activities, 1945–1946 ===
The ship sailed for Okinawa on 1 October, and stopped en route at Samar, Philippine Islands, to take on fresh water before continuing on to the Ryukyus. She reached her destination on 11 October and began issuing water to various fleet units. The ship left Okinawa on 15 November and set a course for Shanghai, China. She touched at that port on the 18th and remained stationed there through April 1946. The vessel left Chinese waters on 2 May and sailed via Okinawa to the Marshall Islands. Abatan reached Eniwetok on 31 May and assumed duties in connection with "Operation Crossroads," a series of tests conducted to determine the effects of atomic explosions upon warships. She was involved in this project until 27 June, when she weighed anchor and got underway for Kwajalein. The distilling ship arrived there the next day and remained in port providing potable water through 17 July. She then commenced a voyage to the east coast of the United States. The vessel visited Pearl Harbor, Hawaii, in late July; transited the Panama Canal; reported to the Atlantic Fleet in mid-August; and then proceeded to Philadelphia, Pennsylvania. She arrived there on 20 August and entered a preinactivation availability phase.

=== Decommissioned, 1947 –1962 ===
Abatan was placed out of commission, in reserve, on 27 January 1947 and was berthed at Philadelphia. Her name was struck from the Navy list on 1 July 1960, and the ship was transferred to the Maritime Administration for layup in the James River.

=== Water storage ship, 1962–1979 ===
Abatan was reacquired by the Navy and reinstated on the Navy list on 27 September 1962 for use as a backup fresh water storage ship at the Naval Base, Guantánamo Bay, Cuba. She was again struck from the Naval Vessel Register on 1 May 1970 but was retained as a hulk for storing water at Guantánamo Bay.

Late in 1979 all desirable equipment was removed from the hull, which was expended as a target on 10 March 1980 approximately 20 miles (32 km) west of Guadeloupe at 16 N – 62 W.
