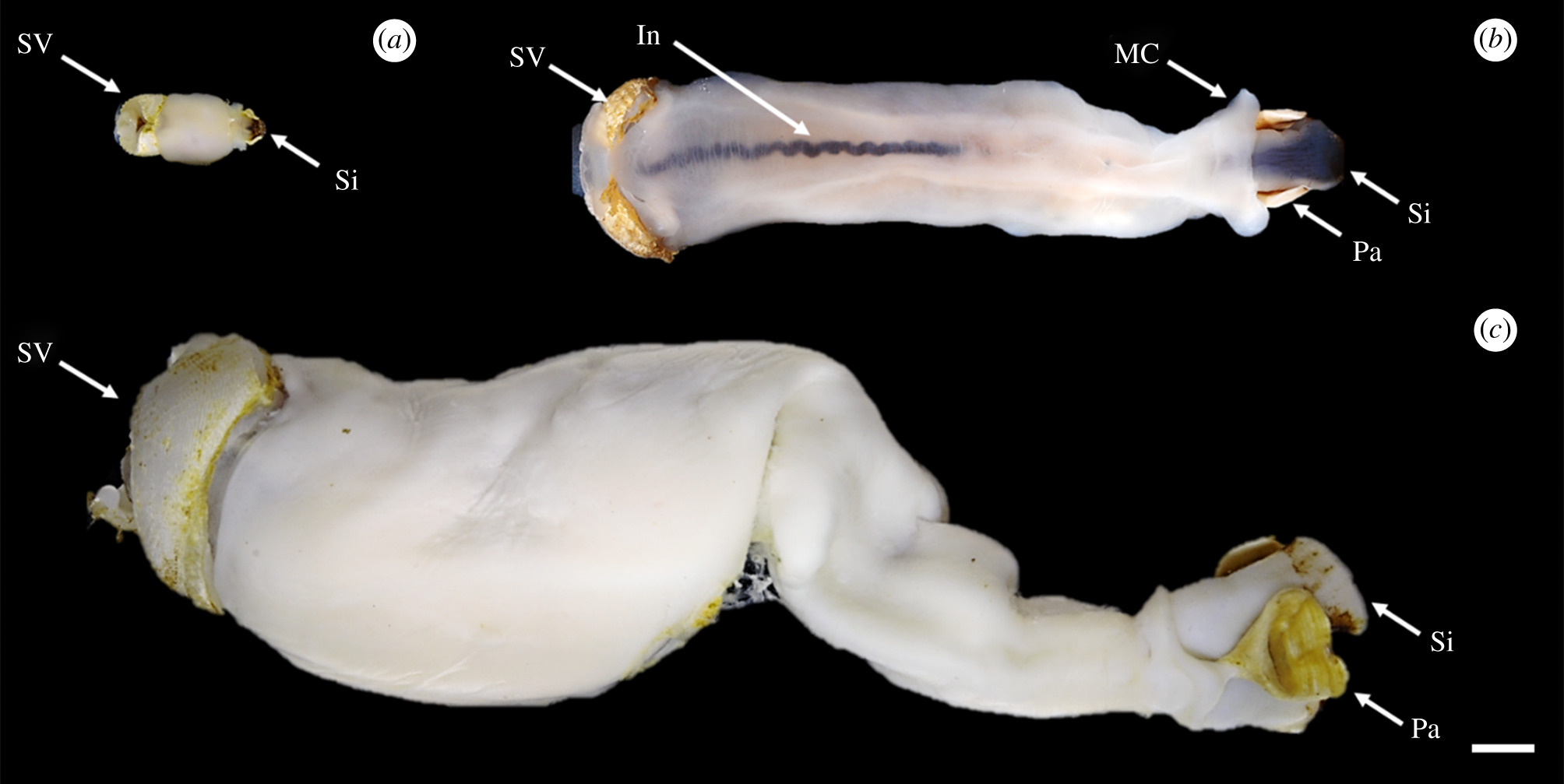
- Three specimens of Lithoredo abatanica: (a) juvenile, (b) small adult and (c) large adult (holotype). Scale bar: 5 mm.

Scientific classification
- Kingdom: Animalia
- Phylum: Mollusca
- Class: Bivalvia
- Order: Myida
- Family: Teredinidae
- Genus: Lithoredo; Shipway, Distel & Rosenberg, 2019
- Species: L. abatanica

Binomial name
- Lithoredo abatanica Shipway, Distel & Rosenberg, 2019

= Lithoredo =

Monotypic genus of freshwater rock-boring bivalves

Lithoredo is a monotypic genus of shipworms, elongated bivalve molluscs in the family Teredinidae. Its only described species, Lithoredo abatanica, inhabits limestone in a freshwater stretch of the Abatan River on Bohol, in the Philippines. Unlike most shipworms, which tunnel through wood and commonly use it as food, L. abatanica bores into solid carbonate rock and ingests the material it removes. Its anterior shell valves are modified for grinding limestone, and it lacks the prominent caecum used to store and digest wood in many other teredinids.

Inside long, often winding tunnels lined with calcite, Lithoredo passes excavated rock particles through its digestive tract and expels them as sediment. Abandoned tunnels provide shelter for other freshwater invertebrates. Although its nutritional requirements remain uncertain, reproductive traits indicate that fertilisation probably takes place in the surrounding water. The combination of freshwater habitat, rock excavation and specialised anatomy distinguishes Lithoredo from most other known shipworms and makes its borings relevant to the interpretation of trace fossils.

== Taxonomy and discovery ==
External morphology of L. abatanica, including the anterior shell valves, calcareous pallets and the denticles of the valve surfaces.

Members of the family Teredinidae have elongated bodies, small anterior shell valves and paired calcareous structures called pallets near the posterior siphons. Most inhabit driftwood, submerged roots or other woody material in estuaries and marine waters, producing burrows that they line with a calcareous tube. The toothed valves rasp away the wood, which also provides nourishment to many species through digestion assisted by bacteria inhabiting their gills. Among the exceptions is Kuphus polythalamius, whose adult life in sediment differs from the usual wood-boring habit. Lithoredo represents a different departure from this ecological pattern, replacing wood with limestone as its excavated substrate.

Before its recognition as a separate genus, the rock-boring shipworm of the Abatan River had been provisionally identified as Spathoteredo sp. and recorded under the local name antingaw. Its occurrence in consolidated riverbank rock rather than submerged timber, together with distinctive shell and digestive characters, distinguishes it from the wood-boring forms to which it was initially compared.

The generic name Lithoredo combines litho-, a Greek-derived element referring to stone, with Teredo, an established shipworm genus. The specific epithet abatanica refers to the Abatan River, its type locality. The holotype is specimen PMS-4312Y (ANSP A477140), a 105.4 mm-long individual deposited at the Academy of Natural Sciences of Drexel University in Philadelphia. Other type and voucher specimens are associated with that institution and the Ocean Genome Legacy Center.

Within the family, Lithoredo is particularly close to Teredora, with Tamilokus and Dicyathifer among other related genera. Both Lithoredo and Teredora possess gills extending along much of the body, but the shape of their shell denticles and pallets differs. The combination of unusually blunt valve denticles, rock ingestion and reduced structures for digesting wood further separates L. abatanica from its relatives.

== Description ==
=== Body size and external features ===
Lithoredo abatanica has an elongated, worm-like body with a thick, whitish to cream-coloured mantle, small paired shell valves at its anterior end and siphons at the posterior end. Recorded body lengths extend from 5.46 to 105.4 mm, with an average of about 40 mm. The smallest individuals are recently settled juveniles, whereas larger adults may occupy considerably longer galleries. Its anterior shell valves are thick and narrow in the anterior–posterior direction, bearing conspicuous rows of broad, blunt, spatula-shaped denticles. These differ from the finer, sharper denticles of wood-boring shipworms and act against the limestone during excavation. A strong posterior adductor muscle is associated with the movement of the valves. The calcareous pallets, which close the burrow entrance, are unsegmented and approximately pentagonal, with a deep depression on their outer surface.

At the posterior end, the siphons are united over much of their length and have several rows of small projections, or papillae, around their openings. Their surrounding calcareous tube has a characteristic figure-eight-shaped aperture that accommodates the two siphonal openings. These features distinguish the animal from several otherwise similar shipworm genera and also have implications for its reproductive behaviour.

=== Internal anatomy ===
Internally, broad, blade-like gills extend from near the siphons almost to the mouth, a large rounded stomach, prominent labial palps and a long intestine that loops around the visceral organs. Unlike the usual condition in wood-feeding shipworms, the caecum is absent or poorly differentiated. The well-developed digestive tract nevertheless transports large quantities of excavated mineral material, which does not itself appear to provide an established source of nutrition.

Numerous bacterial cells occur in association with the gill tissue, although their identity and contribution to the animal's nutrition are unknown. Endosymbiotic bacteria are important to other members of the family: wood-feeding shipworms commonly harbour cellulose-degrading microorganisms, while some sediment-dwelling species rely on chemosynthetic partners. Neither association has been demonstrated to provide Lithoredo with its food.

Among wood-feeding relatives, bacteria of the genus Teredinibacter, including Teredinibacter turnerae, contribute to the breakdown of plant material. Other Teredinibacter species occur in wood-boring teredinids such as Bankia setacea. These established associations do not identify the gill bacteria of L. abatanica, which remain poorly characterised.

=== Genetics and relationships ===
Two mitochondrial genome sequences assigned to L. abatanica are 16,084 and 16,074 base pairs long (GenBank OM910818 and OM910819). Their gene organisation is consistent with the comparatively conserved mitochondrial protein-coding gene order of Teredinidae. The related wood-boring family Xylophagaidae, by contrast, displays greater variation in mitochondrial gene arrangement. Variation in the inferred position of replication origins near transfer RNA genes is also present in Lithoredo. These genetic characteristics place the species within the broader evolutionary history of shipworms and their wood-boring relatives.

== Distribution and habitat ==
Location of the investigated reach of the Abatan River, immediately downstream of Kawasan Falls, on Bohol island.

The river habitat, exposed limestone outcrops and submerged wood at the study locality.

Lithoredo abatanica is known from the Abatan River drainage in southwestern Bohol, part of the central Visayas region of the Philippines. Recorded sites are separated by about 2 km; the more upstream locality is just below Kawasan Falls in Antequera. The occupied river reach lies roughly 15 km upstream from the river mouth, although the full distribution of the species within and beyond the drainage is unknown. Water levels vary with river discharge and tidal influence, but the main limestone locality has freshwater salinities below 0.5 parts per thousand at both high and low tide. Slightly brackish values of about 1–2 parts per thousand have been reported farther downstream. Animals inhabit exposed bedrock and submerged limestone blocks rather than the woody debris in the same river.

Dense riparian vegetation borders the sampled reach. Limestone blocks, cobbles and boulders are visible in and beside the channel, some partly covered by algae. Although Lithoredo occupies submerged carbonate rock, nearby waterlogged branches, roots and logs are inhabited by the wood-boring shipworm Nausitora sp. The co-occurrence of these different shipworms within the same freshwater environment, but in different substrates, was documented in the original field studies.

== Geological setting ==
Photomicrographs of the limestone bored by L. abatanica. The rock contains foraminifera, echinoderm debris and micritic cement; the walls of some borings cut across fossil tests.

Exposed in the modern freshwater channel, the limestone occupied by L. abatanica belongs to a Neogene marine carbonate succession. Southwestern Bohol includes Miocene and younger strata, notably the Carmen Formation and the younger Maribojoc Limestone. The bored rock has provisionally been assigned to the Anda Limestone Member of the Carmen Formation, but its precise stratigraphic position remains uncertain.

A moderately indurated, yellowish-grey biomicrite, or foraminiferal packstone, forms much of the bored bedrock. It contains abundant planktonic and benthic foraminifer tests, along with fragments of echinoderms, gastropods and bivalve shells. Some shell fragments bear older microborings. Most grains, approximately 0.1–1.0 mm across, occur in a fine micrite matrix, with more sparsely packed patches representing possible intraclasts or former burrow fills.

Pores within the fossils and other grains are locally filled with micrite, microspar and iron-rich mineral cements, possibly including goethite and chamosite. Some of this cementation may reflect later interaction with iron-rich river water or groundwater. The carbonate rock was deposited in a marine setting, whereas the living shipworms excavate it in fresh water, well after its formation and exposure.

== Rock excavation and ingestion ==
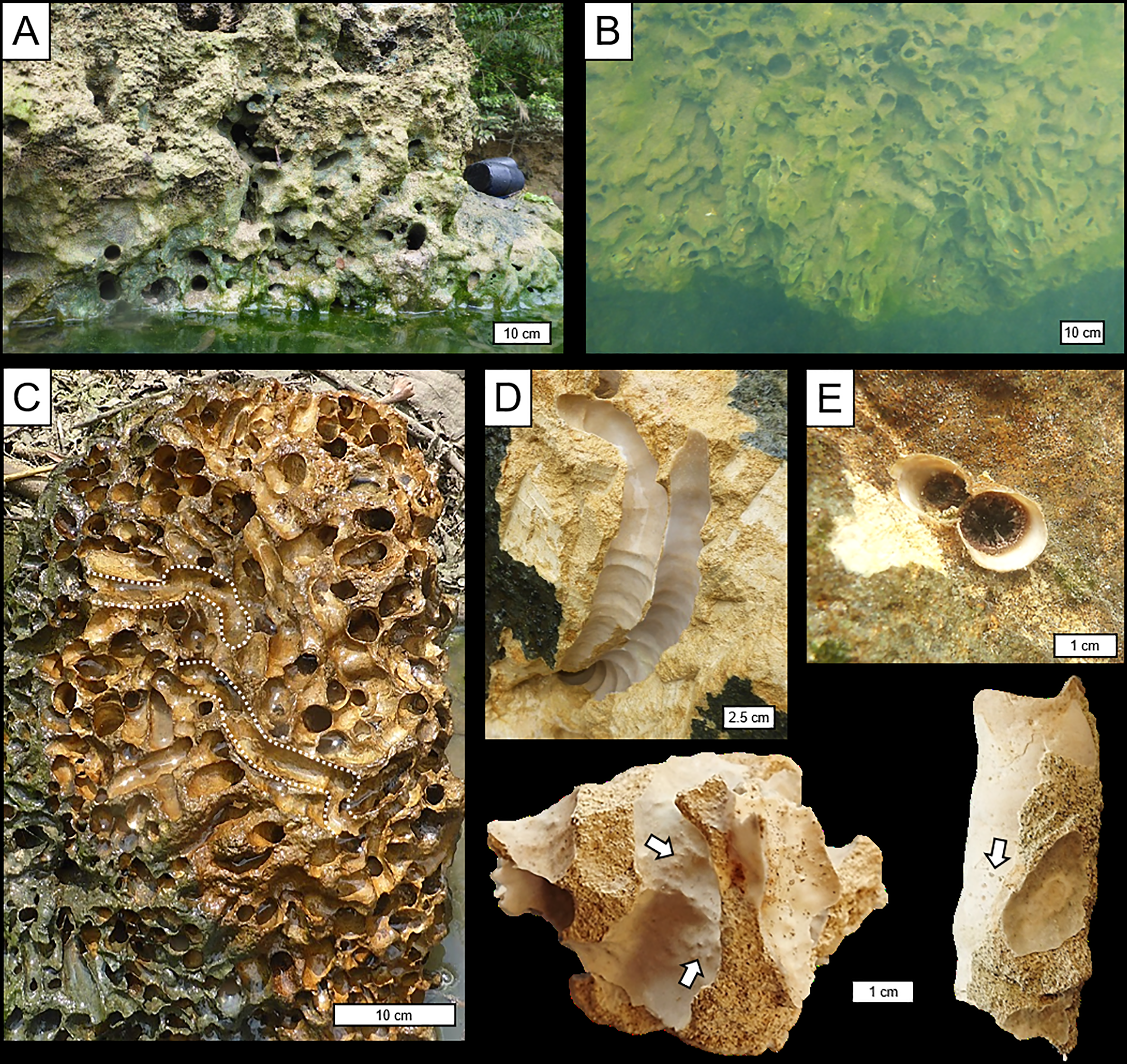
Limestone borings produced by L. abatanica. Some galleries have tortuous axes and layered calcite linings; the entrance commonly has a figure-eight outline.

Comparison of L. abatanica (A), extracted from limestone, and the wood-boring Nausitora sp. (B).

Lithoredo abatanica excavates limestone by pressing and moving its small, denticulated anterior valves against the rock. Considerable quantities of the loosened mineral particles enter the digestive tract, where their composition closely matches the surrounding limestone; the material includes calcium-rich carbonate together with silicon-, aluminium-, magnesium- and iron-bearing constituents. The ingested particles pass through the intestine and are expelled as fine sediment. Ingestion is therefore an integral part of its rock-boring behaviour, although no nutritional benefit from the mineral particles has been established.

Broad valve denticles and a powerful posterior adductor muscle are consistent with substantial mechanical abrasion during excavation. Whether chemical dissolution also contributes directly to limestone removal in Lithoredo is uncertain. The freshwater rock-boring pholadid Lignopholas fluminalis, which excavates silicate-rich rock rather than limestone, has microbial biofilms associated with mineral alteration inside its galleries. Comparable microbially assisted weathering has not been demonstrated for L. abatanica.

Galleries commonly enter the limestone nearly perpendicular to its exposed surface, then curve or twist within the rock. They widen gradually toward their inner ends and are approximately circular in cross-section through much of their length. Closely spaced galleries can leave partitions of limestone around 1 mm thick or less. In heavily perforated areas, adjacent tunnels may be separated almost entirely by their calcite linings, and portions of the bedrock become riddled with interconnected-looking openings, although the individual inhabited galleries remain distinct. Some partly exposed tunnels extend for more than 30 cm.

Calcite secreted along the gallery walls forms a lining less than 0.5 mm to approximately 2.5 mm thick, sometimes with several layers and faint transverse annulations spaced roughly 3–15 mm apart. At the entrance, a partition separates the openings of the incurrent and excurrent siphons, producing a distinctive figure-eight outline. In places the calcite tube projects above the original rock surface.

One intact, abandoned gallery is more than 200 mm long, and additional underwater observations suggest that some tunnels may exceed 500 mm; the latter lengths remain unconfirmed by direct measurements. Among the currently described freshwater invertebrates that bore into consolidated rock, L. abatanica has exceptionally large individuals and galleries and has been characterised as the largest known freshwater macrobioeroder.

== Feeding and symbiosis ==
Despite its extensive ingestion of limestone, the diet of L. abatanica remains uncertain. Mineral grains passing through the gut do not demonstrate that the animal obtains energy or nutrients from the stone. Possible food sources include suspended phytoplankton, bacteria and organic detritus, microorganisms or organic material on the rock surface, and products of bacterial endosymbiosis. Its substantial gills and labial palps are consistent with the collection of suspended food particles, but no single feeding pathway has been established.

A reduced caecum, substantial digestive tract and bacteria-bearing gills distinguish Lithoredo from the better-known wood-digesting shipworms. In the sediment-dwelling giant shipworm Kuphus polythalamius, sulphur-oxidising bacterial symbionts can supply nutrition without a wood-based diet. The presence of bacteria in L. abatanica raises a different, still unresolved question: whether they participate in feeding, provide other physiological benefits or simply inhabit the gill tissues.

== Reproduction and life history ==
Small juveniles and reproductively mature adults occur together in the limestone galleries of the Abatan River. Individuals shorter than 10 mm indicate recent settlement, whereas larger specimens have developed reproductive organs, consistent with continuing recruitment within the population.

Spermatozoa have a relatively long acrosomal apparatus, with a mean acrosome-to-body length ratio of about 0.39. This is closer to the proportions found in externally fertilising shipworms (0.32–0.43) than in internally fertilising forms (0.21–0.25). Sperm morphology therefore supports external fertilisation, although it is not conclusive on its own.

Short, partially fused siphons lie within a rigid calcareous tube, limiting the direct contact required for pseudocopulation, in which neighbouring shipworms transfer sperm between their siphons. Together with sperm morphology, this arrangement suggests broadcast spawning, with eggs and sperm released into the surrounding water for external fertilisation. Direct observation of spawning has not yet established this reproductive mode conclusively.

A planktotrophic larval stage is considered likely, but neither larval development nor dispersal has been directly documented. Maintaining a population approximately 15 km upstream poses a difficulty if larvae drift downstream with the river current. Retention in sheltered parts of the habitat or changes in reproductive timing could help explain persistence in the river, but the mechanisms of larval transport, recruitment and population connectivity remain unknown.

== Ichnology and palaeontological significance ==
Comparison of several club-shaped bivalve ichnotaxa and the substrates in which their traces occur.

As biogenic structures, the elongated galleries of L. abatanica have the potential to be preserved as trace fossils. Their gradually widening outlines, irregular axes and calcareous linings closely resemble Teredolites longissimus, an ichnospecies commonly associated with wood-boring shipworms. The distinction lies partly in the substrate: Lithoredo excavates consolidated lithic material, whereas Teredolites has traditionally been recognised in wood and other woody remains. Classification is therefore not straightforward. Their shape approaches the long, sinuous borings assigned to Teredolites or Apectoichnus, but excavation in rock also brings them into comparison with Gastrochaenolites. The galleries have not been assigned a universally accepted new ichnospecies, and their affinities illustrate the importance of both boring morphology and substrate type in ichnotaxonomy.

Fossil shipworm borings are frequently associated with marine transgressions and have been used to recognise coastal, estuarine and marine influence in sedimentary successions. Similar structures can nevertheless form in fresh water: L. abatanica excavates limestone in the Abatan River, while Nausitora bores into submerged wood in the same stretch. Consequently, teredinid-like borings cannot independently establish marine salinity. Interpretation of a palaeoenvironment also depends on the host substrate, associated fossils, sedimentology and other evidence of salinity.

In fossil assemblages, the size, abundance and composition of Teredolites borings may vary along gradients from upper estuaries to fully marine settings. Their value as ichnofacies indicators therefore depends on the environmental context rather than the mere presence of a particular shape. The freshwater rock borings of Lithoredo provide an additional modern example of how comparable structures can form under different salinity conditions.

Other freshwater animals that excavate consolidated rock include the pholadid bivalve Lignopholas fluminalis and rock-boring larvae of some mayflys and other insects. Several of these organisms belong to groups with wood-boring relatives, showing how structures used to penetrate softer organic material can also function against harder substrates. Lithoredo is notable among them for the size of both its body and its limestone galleries.

Comparable fossil evidence is not restricted to the Philippines. In the Kutch Basin of western India, Teredolites solitarius occurs as solitary, lined borings in Cenozoic carbonate strata. These traces have been associated with a Kuphus-like teredinid rather than Lithoredo, and differ in orientation, substrate context and taphonomy. Their occurrence illustrates the range of forms and depositional settings that need to be considered when identifying fossil shipworm borings.

== Ecological role ==
Lithoredo abatanica removed from limestone in the Abatan River. The shell valves are at the anterior end; siphons and pallets lie posteriorly.

Dense concentrations of galleries increase the porosity and complexity of exposed limestone in the Abatan River. Vacant tunnels shelter crabs, shrimp, limpets, gastropods, other bivalves and polychaete worms. By creating such habitats, L. abatanica functions as a local ecosystem engineer. The removal of mineral particles also weakens portions of the bedrock and produces fine sediment. This may enhance later physical and chemical weathering and alter the riverbank or channel during periods of strong flow. Extensive local erosion is evident, but the total sediment output and long-term contribution to river-channel development remain unquantified.

== Conservation and research ==
Confirmed records of Lithoredo abatanica come from a relatively short section of the Abatan River, but its complete geographical range, population size and population trends are not established. Its specialised freshwater habitat may be vulnerable to local environmental changes. No formal conservation status can be inferred from the published locality records alone.

Rock excavation by Lithoredo and other organisms has also attracted interest in biomimetics. Mechanical excavation combined with chemical weakening of rock has been proposed as a possible inspiration for improving tunnel boring machine cutters. This remains a conceptual application of biological rock erosion, rather than a technology demonstrated or tested using L. abatanica.
