= Loboc River =

River in Bohol, Philippines

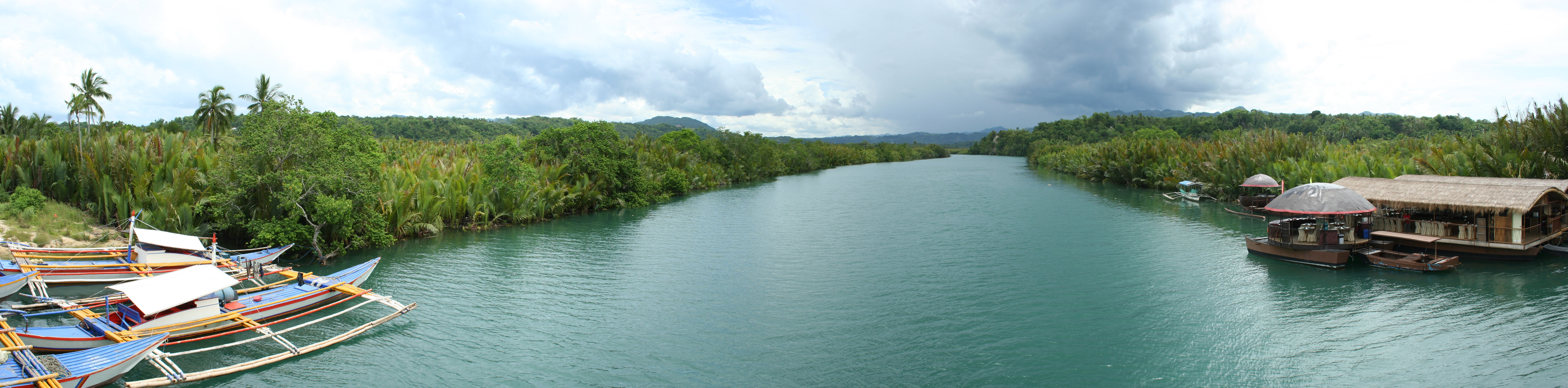

- Location within Visayas Location within Philippines

Location
- Country: Philippines
- Region: Central Visayas
- Province: Bohol

Physical characteristics
- Source
  - location: Carmen
- Mouth: Bohol Sea
  - location: Loay
  - coordinates: 9°36′03″N 124°00′32″E
- Basin size: 520 km^{2} (200 sq mi)
- Loboc River hydroelectric plant
- Interactive map of Loboc River hydroelectric plant

Lower dam and spillways
- Spillway capacity: 14.3 m^{3}/s

Power Station
- Commission date: April 6, 1957; January 20, 1968
- Type: Run-of-the-river
- Hydraulic head: 11.1 metres (36 ft)
- Turbines: 3
- Installed capacity: 1.2 MW
- Annual generation: 9.45 million KWH

The Loboc River (also called Loay River) is a river in the Bohol province of the Philippines. It is one of the major tourist destinations of Bohol.

The source of the Loboc River is located in the town of Carmen, almost in the center of Bohol. From Carmen, the river takes a westerly course for a distance of about 1.5 kilometres (1 mi) then flows due south into the Mindanao or Bohol Sea. Its drainage area of approximately, 520 square kilometres (200 sq mi), is bordered by a horseshoe-shaped chain of mountain peaks rising to an elevation of 800 metres (2,600 ft). Rainfall is distributed almost uniformly throughout the year, thus Loboc River has a steady and high base flow.

== Attractions ==
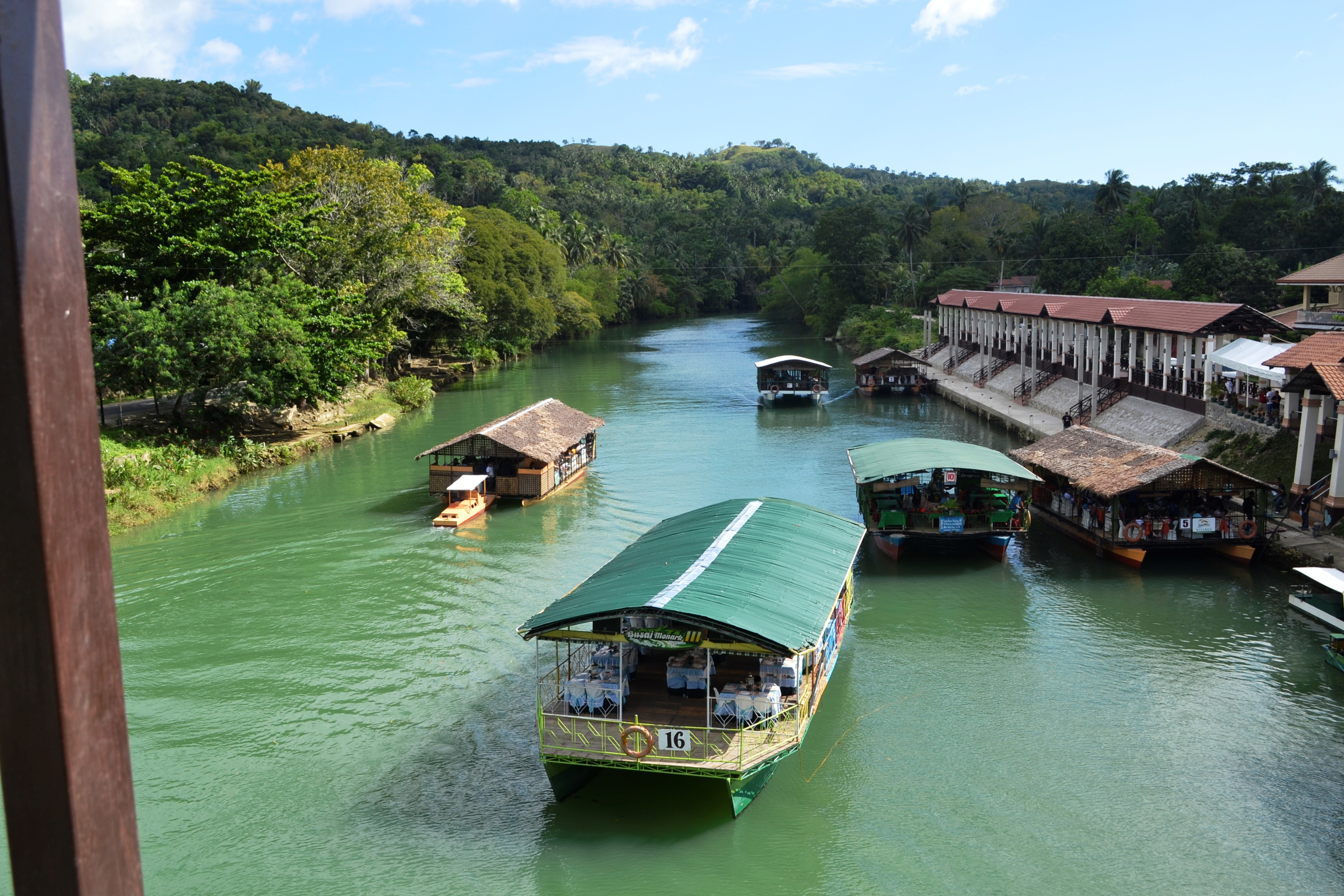
Floating restaurants river cruises

The Loboc river passes through the town center of the Municipality of Loboc, offering a riverside view of the Loboc church across the highway. Various activities on the river, including the river cruise and standup paddleboarding typically feature a scenic trip upriver to Busay falls, or to various points in the river where visitors can enjoy buffets, cultural presentations, firefly watching, birding, and even paddleboard yoga.

Prior to an earthquake that struck Bohol in 2013, night cruises on the Loboc river also featured lightshows through colored lights installed on the river banks. However, the lights were severely damaged due to the said earthquake.

== Hydroelectricity ==
There is one hydroelectric plant on the Loboc River. Construction on the plant began in 1955, completed in 1957 and an expansion completed in 1968.

== See also ==
Other significant rivers in Bohol:

- Abatan River
- Inabanga River
