= Maribojoc =

Municipality in Bohol, Philippines

Maribojoc Dunggoan
- Municipality
- Municipality of Maribojoc
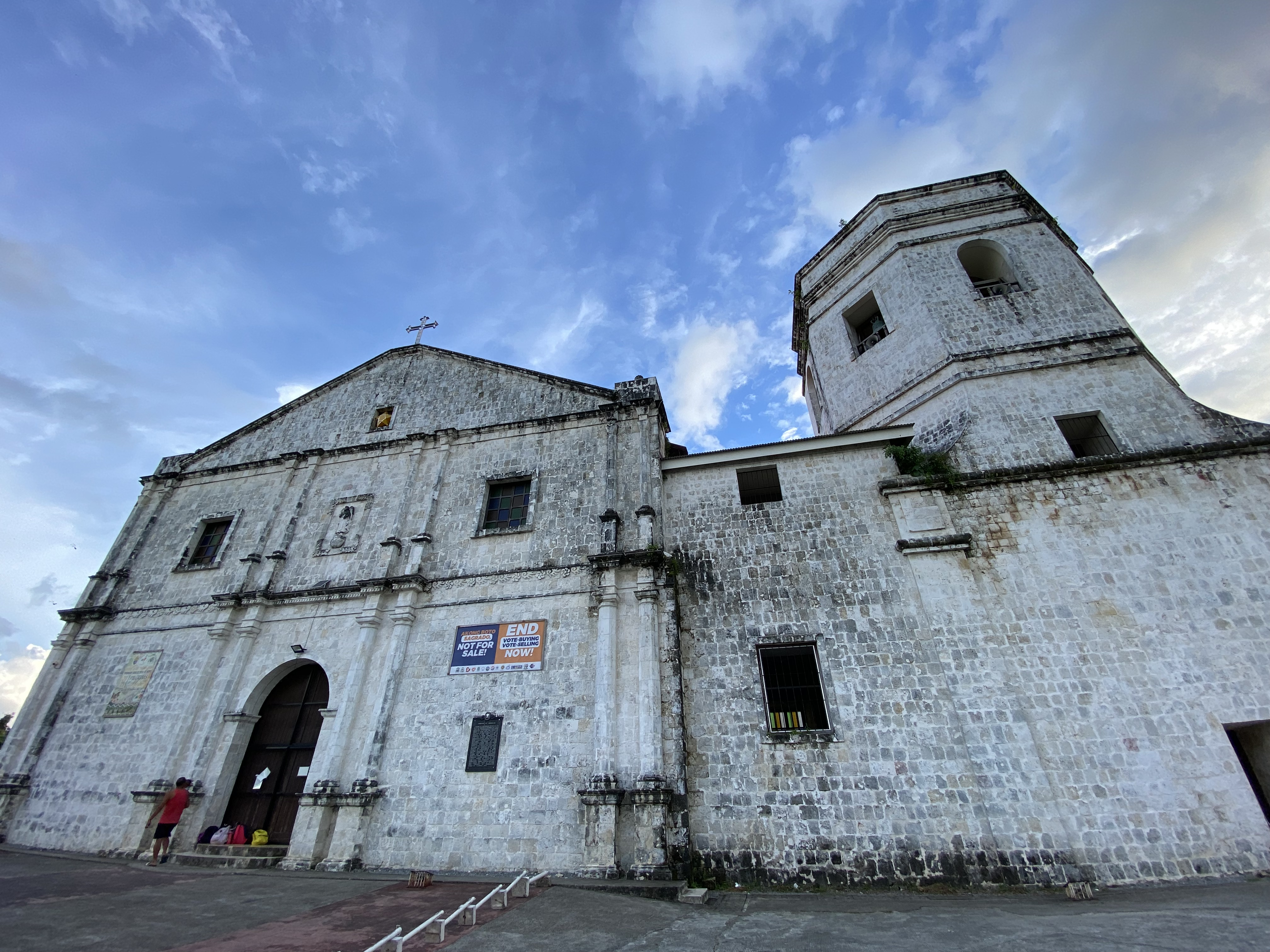
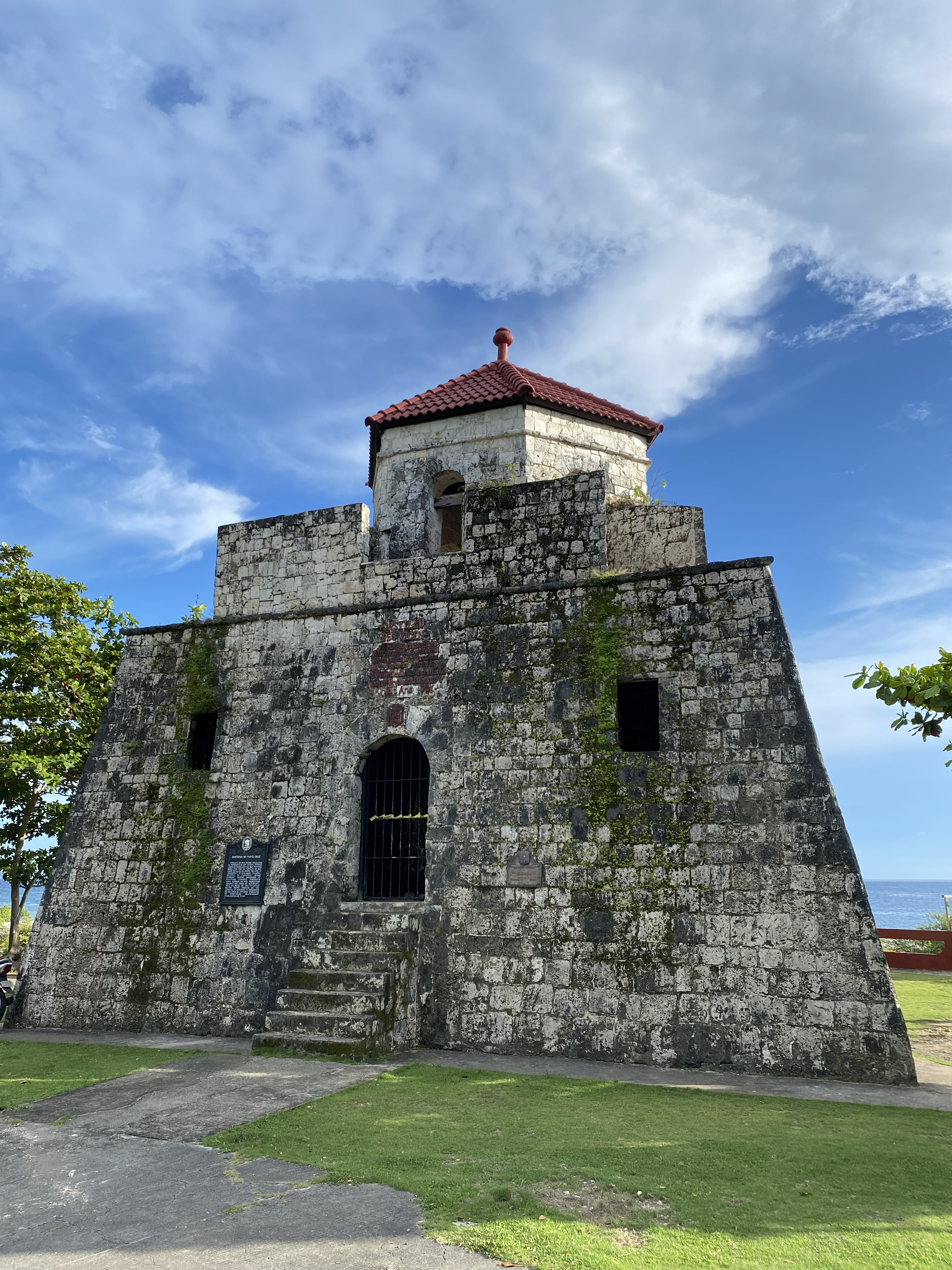
- Town Proper (Poblacion) Maribojoc Church Punta Cruz Watchtower

- Flag

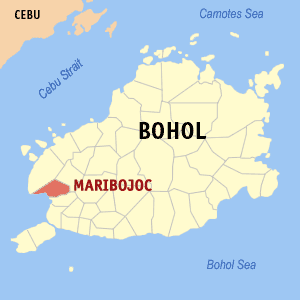
- Map of Bohol with Maribojoc highlighted
- Interactive map of Maribojoc
- Location within the Philippines
- Coordinates: 9°45′N 123°51′E
- Country: Philippines
- Region: Central Visayas
- Province: Bohol
- District: 1st district
- Founded: 15 October 1860
- Barangays: 22 (see Barangays)

Government
  - Type: Sangguniang Bayan
  - Mayor: Jojo Rojas
  - Vice Mayor: Boyet Castilla
  - Representative: John Geesnell Yap
  - Municipal Council: Members: Jose V. Arocha; Arnulfo D. Turco Jr.; Franklin R. Medequiso; Lourdes Concepcion T. Endo; Andresa E. Pohl; Jonathan L. Rojas; Marcelino B. Dapiton; Jedfrey S. Veloso
  - Electorate: 14,952 voters (2025)

Area
  - Total: 69.08 km^{2} (26.67 sq mi)
- Elevation: 100 m (330 ft)
- Highest elevation: 449 m (1,473 ft)
- Lowest elevation: 0 m (0 ft)

Population (2024 census)
  - Total: 22,268
  - Density: 322.4/km^{2} (834.9/sq mi)
  - Households: 5,564

Economy
  - Income class: 3rd municipal income class
  - Poverty incidence: 11.8% (2023)
  - Revenue: ₱ 189.9 million (2024)
  - Assets: ₱ 399.1 million (2024)
  - Expenditure: ₱ 55.84 million (2024)
  - Liabilities: ₱ 56.67 million (2024)

Service provider
  - Electricity: Bohol 1 Electric Cooperative (BOHECO 1)
- Time zone: UTC+8 (PST)
- ZIP code: 6336
- PSGC: 071232000
- IDD : area code: +63 (0)38
- Native languages: Boholano dialect Cebuano; Tagalog

Maribojoc, officially the Municipality of Maribojoc (Cebuano: Munisipalidad sa Maribojoc; Tagalog: Bayan ng Maribojoc), is a municipality in the province of Bohol, Philippines. According to the 2024 census, it has a population of 22,268 people.

The town of Maribojoc, Bohol celebrates its feast on November 24th, or May 5th to honor the town patron Saint Vincent.

== History ==
Maribojoc was a fishing village when Jesuit priests Juan de Torres and Gabriel Sanchez landed in Baclayon in 1595, bringing Catholicism also to Maribojoc. Fr. Francisco Colín, an early Jesuit historian, listed the town's name as Malabooch and later changed it to Malabohoc. During the pre-Spanish era, the town's name was Dunggoan, meaning "place of anchorage" and referred to the sheltered bay where sailors used to land and engage in business with the early settlers.

The Maribojoc parish, officially known as Parroquía de Santa Cruz, was founded in 1767, when the Jesuits left Maribojoc. Maribojoc was one of the nine big villages founded by the Augustinian Recollect friars when they took over in 1768. They laid the foundation of the Maribojoc church in 1798 on what was once swampy land, and it was finished in 1816, after 18 years of work. At the back of the church is a flight of stone stairs, built in 1864. Earlier, in 1796, the Punta Cruz Watchtower was built as a lookout against marauding pirates.

The town of Maribojoc was officially incorporated on 15 October 1860, and grew into a thriving town with a population of 18,200 by 1879.

Maribojoc was severely affected by the magnitude 7.2 earthquake which struck Bohol, suffering 16 fatalities and damage to some 3,700 homes, as well as total destruction of its Catholic church.

Ruins of the Maribojoc Church after the 2013 earthquake

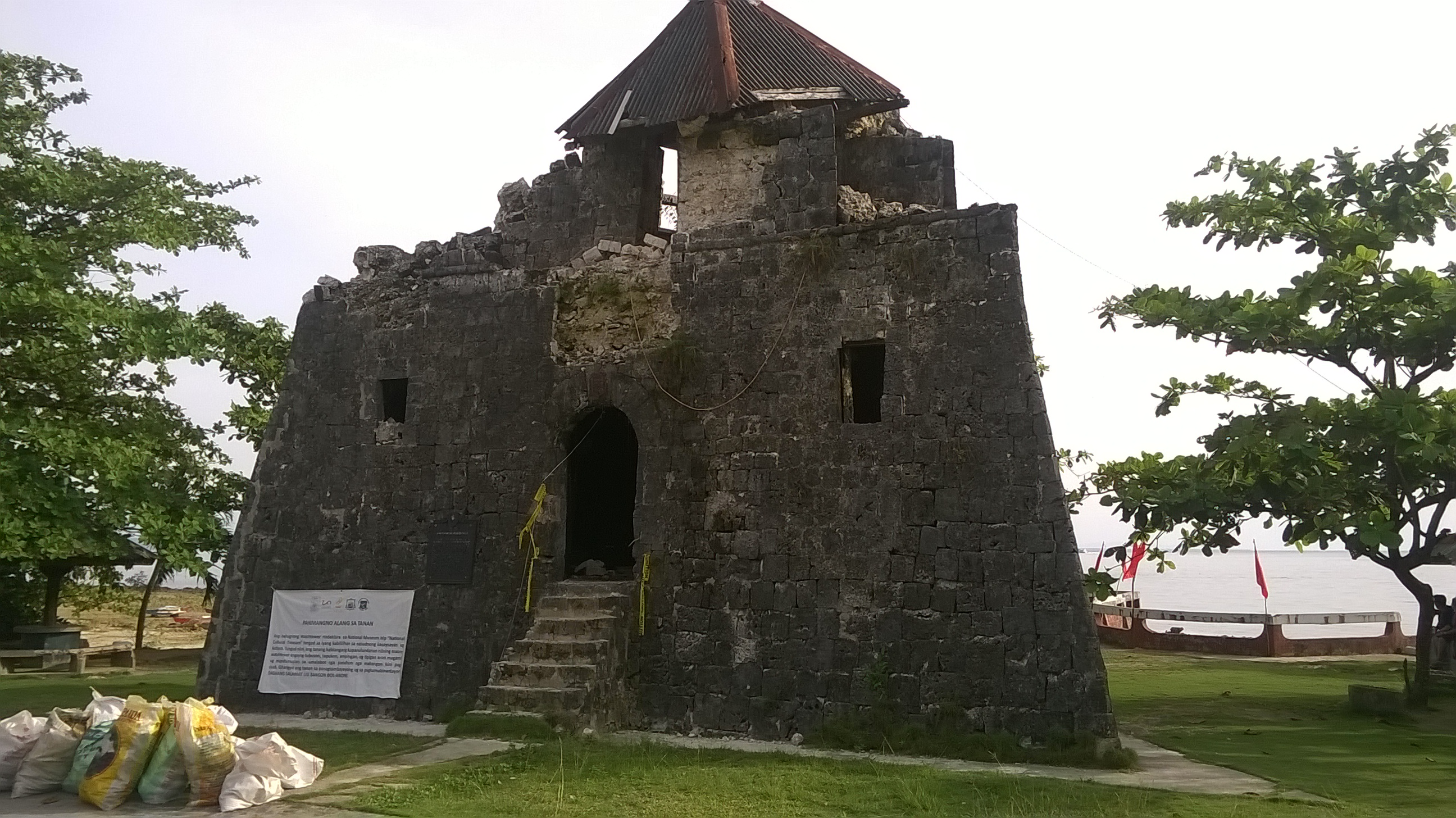
Remains of Punta Cruz watchtower, Maribojoc Bohol post-2013 earthquake

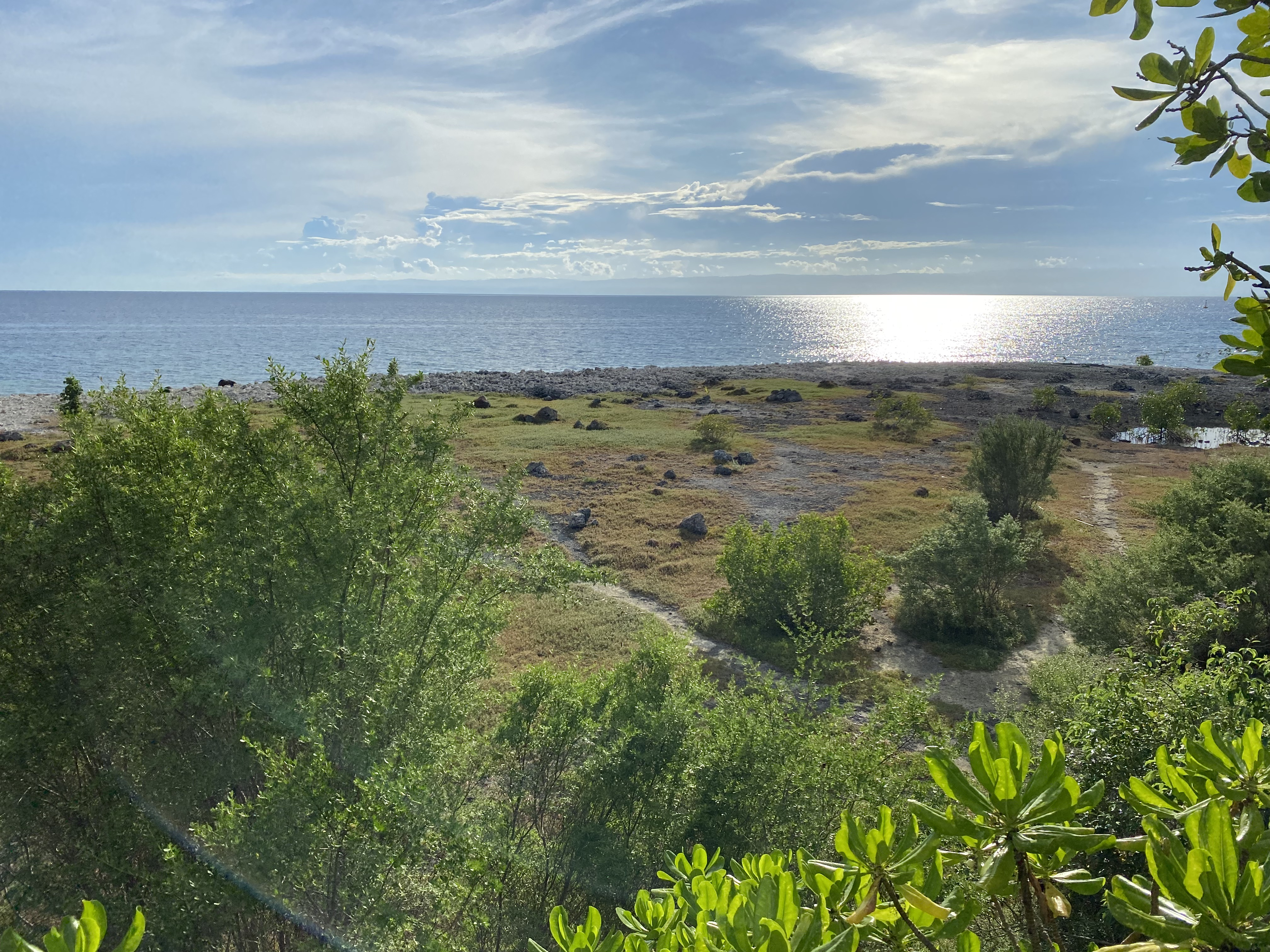
Uplifted marine terrace (post-2013 Bohol Earthquake) beside Punta Cruz

== Geography ==
Maribojoc has a land area of 6,908 hectares (17,070 acres). It is 14 kilometres (8.7 mi) from Tagbilaran.

=== Barangays ===
Maribojoc is politically subdivided into 22 barangays. Each barangay consists of puroks and some have sitios.

PSGC	Barangay	Population			±% p.a.		Area		PD 2024	
		2024		2010			ha	acre	/km^{2}	/sq mi
071232002	Agahay	2.8%	625	603	▴	0.25%	305	754	200	530
071232003	Aliguay	4.4%	971	859	▴	0.85%	326	806	300	770
071232004	Anislag	4.4%	988	1,004	▾	−0.11%	93	230	1,100	2,800
071232005	Bayacabac	8.2%	1,835	1,601	▴	0.95%	353	872	520	1,300
071232006	Bood	1.9%	426	475	▾	−0.75%	312	771	140	350
071232007	Busao	2.4%	537	587	▾	−0.62%	146	361	370	950
071232008	Cabawan	7.3%	1,626	1,516	▴	0.49%	467	1,154	350	900
071232009	Candavid	2.2%	498	541	▾	−0.57%	367	907	140	350
071232010	Dipatlong	6.7%	1,495	1,562	▾	−0.30%	147	363	1,000	2,600
071232011	Guiwanon	2.4%	532	569	▾	−0.46%	335	828	160	410
071232012	Jandig	4.6%	1,032	897	▴	0.98%	662	1,636	160	400
071232013	Lagtangon	1.0%	232	266	▾	−0.94%	331	818	70	180
071232014	Lincod	7.8%	1,726	1,781	▾	−0.22%	245	605	700	1,800
071232015	Pagnitoan	2.8%	630	630	Steady	0.00%	510	1,260	120	320
071232016	Poblacion	9.4%	2,103	2,298	▾	−0.61%	93	230	2,300	5,900
071232017	Punsod	3.0%	657	644	▴	0.14%	119	294	550	1,400
071232018	Punta Cruz	3.3%	737	770	▾	−0.30%	435	1,075	170	440
071232019	San Isidro	2.7%	605	525	▴	0.99%	309	764	200	510
071232001	San Roque (Aghao)	5.6%	1,256	1,177	▴	0.45%	536	1,325	230	610
071232020	San Vicente	4.9%	1,097	1,115	▾	−0.11%	113	279	970	2,500
071232021	Tinibgan	2.6%	576	614	▾	−0.44%	441	1,090	130	340
071232022	Toril	2.3%	504	457	▴	0.68%	263	650	190	500
	Total		22,268	20,491	▴	0.58%	6,908	17,070	320	14

=== Climate ===
Climate data for Maribojoc, Bohol
Month	Jan	Feb	Mar	Apr	May	Jun	Jul	Aug	Sep	Oct	Nov	Dec	Year
Mean daily maximum °C (°F)	28 (82)	29 (84)	30 (86)	31 (88)	31 (88)	30 (86)	30 (86)	30 (86)	30 (86)	29 (84)	29 (84)	29 (84)	30 (85)
Mean daily minimum °C (°F)	23 (73)	22 (72)	23 (73)	23 (73)	24 (75)	25 (77)	24 (75)	24 (75)	24 (75)	24 (75)	23 (73)	23 (73)	24 (74)
Average precipitation mm (inches)	102 (4.0)	85 (3.3)	91 (3.6)	75 (3.0)	110 (4.3)	141 (5.6)	121 (4.8)	107 (4.2)	111 (4.4)	144 (5.7)	169 (6.7)	139 (5.5)	1,395 (55.1)
Average rainy days	18.6	14.8	16.5	16.7	23.9	26.4	25.6	24.1	24.4	26.3	23.7	20.5	261.5
Source: Meteoblue

== Demographics ==
Population census of Maribojoc
Year	Pop.	±% p.a.
1903	11,830	—
1918	13,627	+0.95%
1939	13,834	+0.07%
1948	13,906	+0.06%
1960	13,003	−0.56%
1970	14,055	+0.78%
1975	14,333	+0.39%
1980	14,008	−0.46%
1990	15,214	+0.83%
1995	14,664	−0.69%
2000	16,786	+2.94%
2007	18,113	+1.05%
2010	20,491	+4.59%
2015	20,688	+0.18%
2020	22,178	+1.47%
2024	22,268	+0.10%
Source: Philippine Statistics Authority

The main language is Cebuano, with a Boholano accent. Tagalog and English are also spoken and understood.

== Economy ==
Poverty incidence of Maribojoc (%)

Source: Philippine Statistics Authority

Fishing and agriculture are the two main sources of livelihood.

== Gallery ==
Maribojoc Presidencia

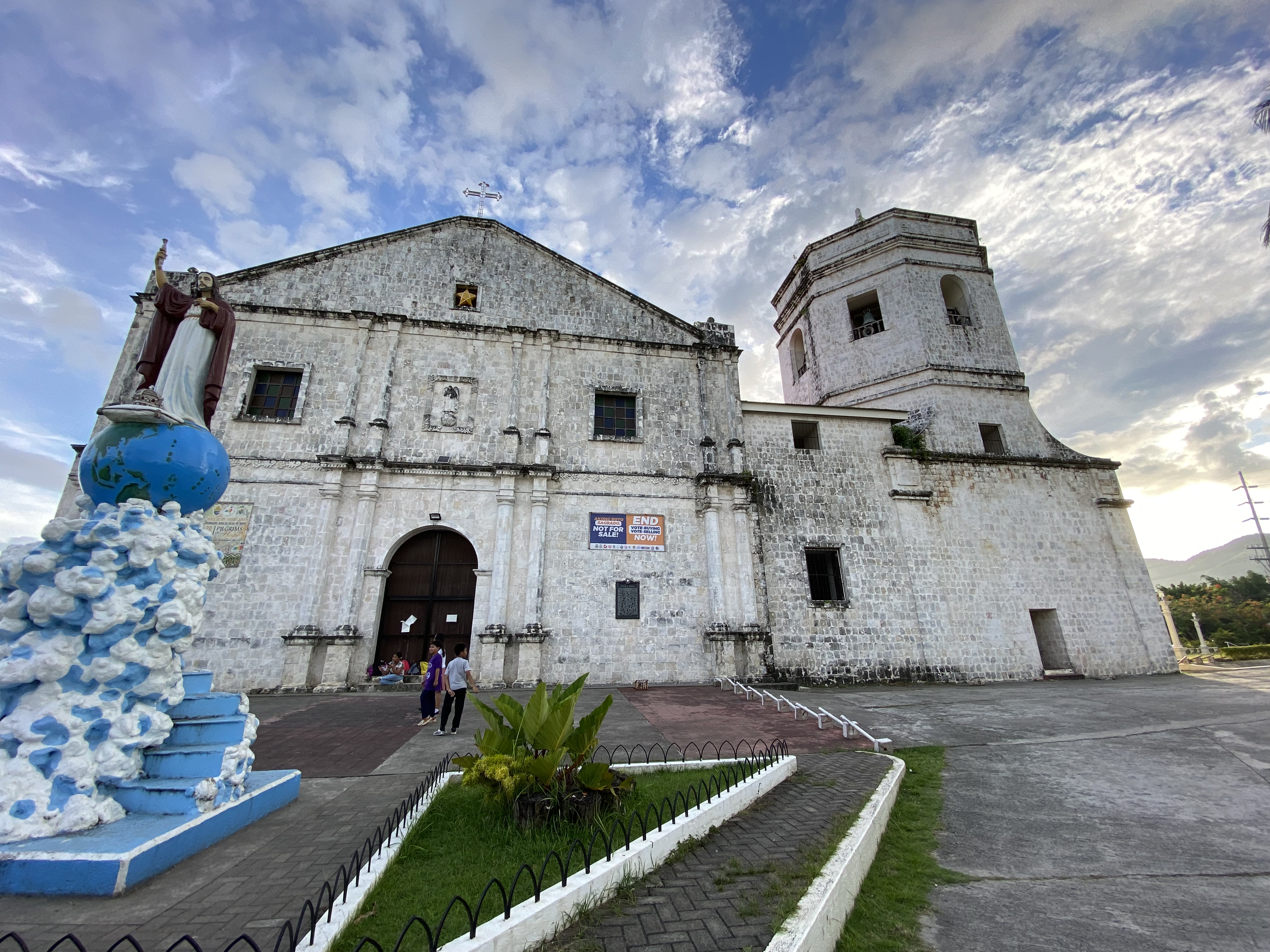
Maribojoc Church post-renovation, in 2025

Punta Cruz watchtower post-renovation, in 2019

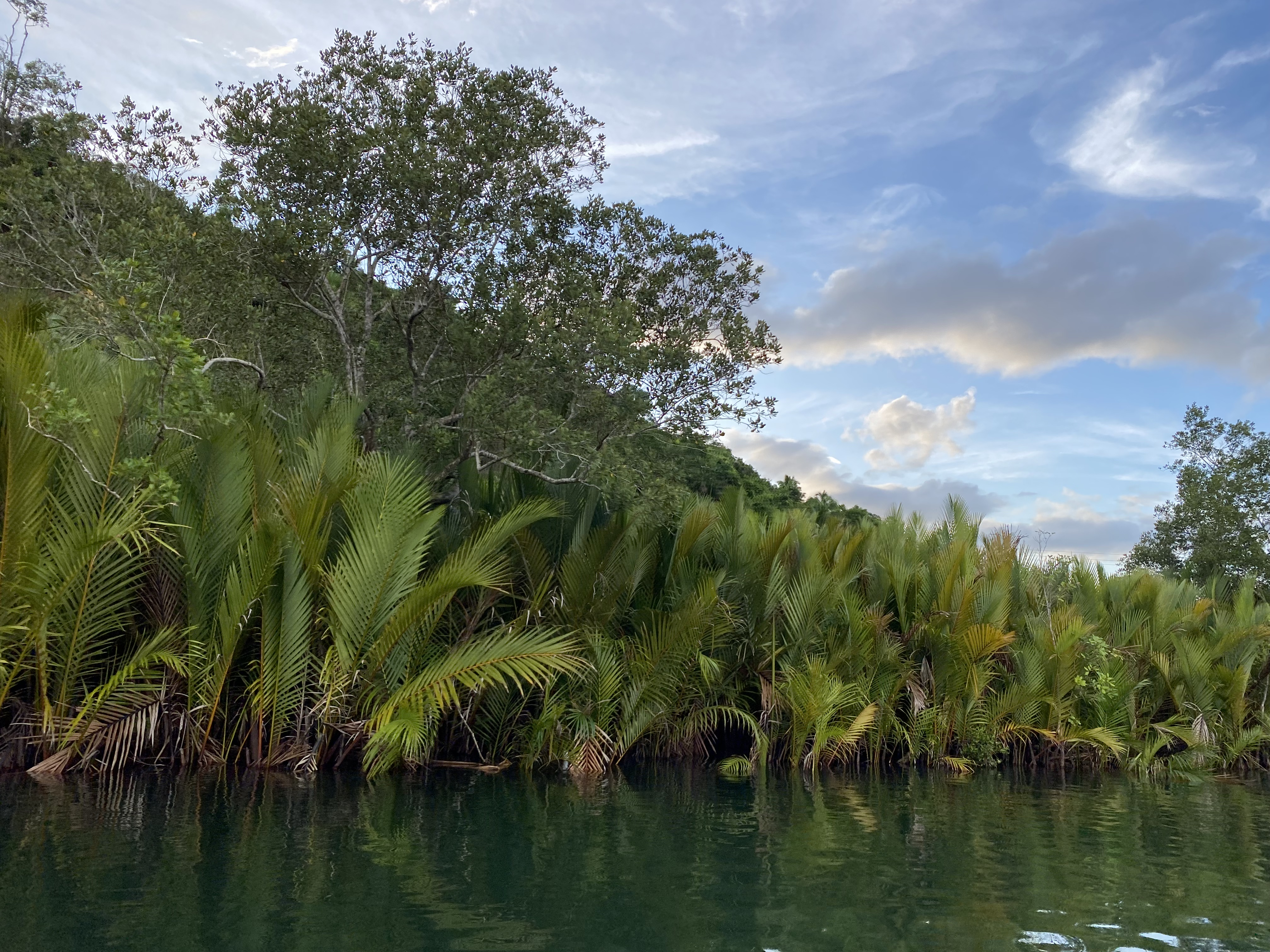
Abatan River mangroves

== Sources ==
- Colín, Fr Francisco (1663). Labor evangelica, ministerios apostolicos de los obreros de la Compañia de Jesus, fundacion y progresos de su provincia en las Islas Filipinas (3 vols) (in Spanish). Madrid: Joseph Fernandez Buendia. OCLC 41563762.
