= Inabanga River =

River in Bohol, Philippines

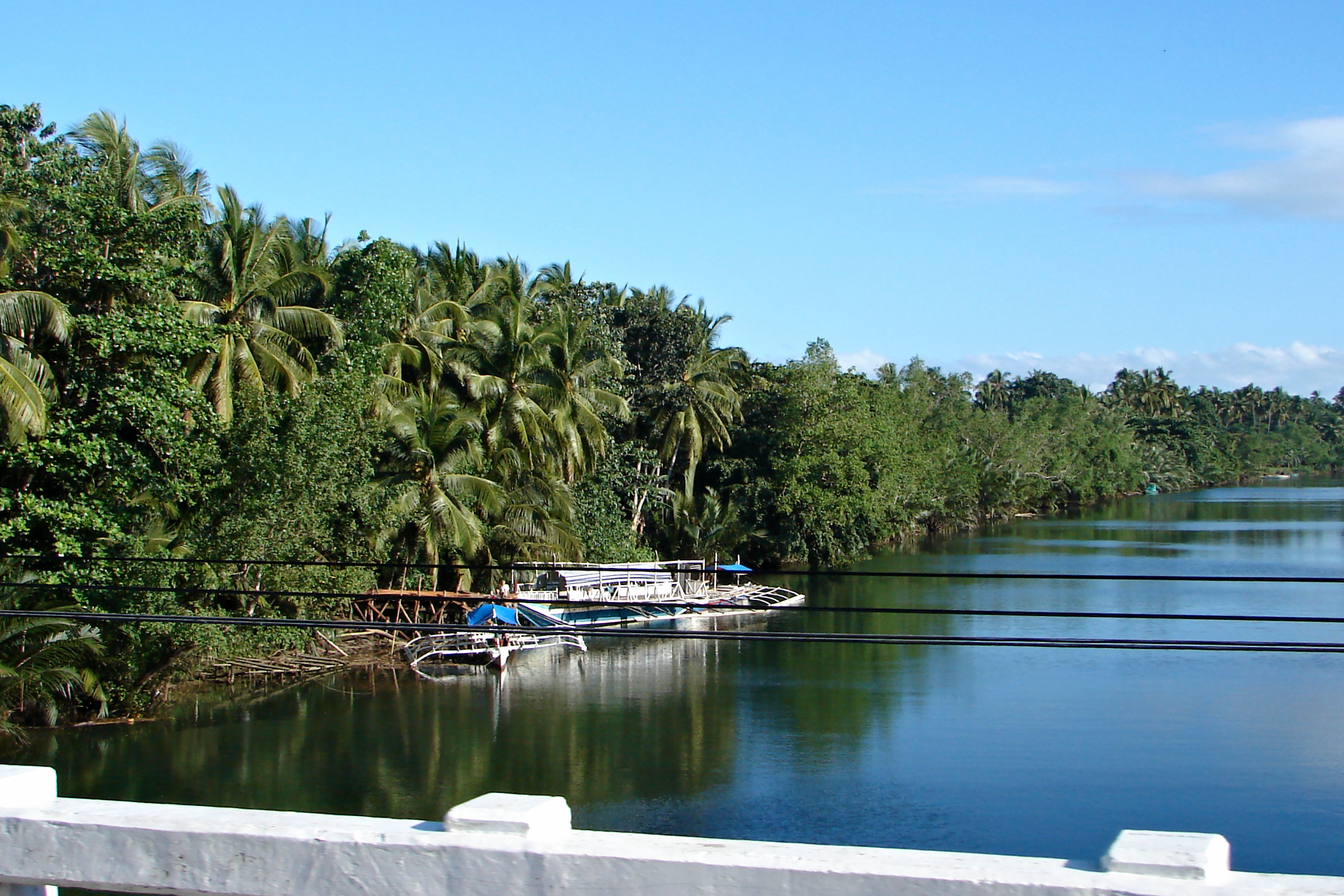

- Location within Visayas Location within Philippines

Location
- Country: Philippines
- Region: Central Visayas
- Province: Bohol

Physical characteristics
- Source
  - location: Sierra Bullones, Pilar
- Mouth: Cebu Strait
  - location: Inabanga
  - coordinates: 10°04′28″N 124°04′34″E
- Length: 25 km (16 mi)
- Basin size: 627.93 km^{2} (242.45 sq mi)
- Width
  - maximum: 10 m (33 ft)
- Discharge
  - average: 22.86 m^{3}/s (807 cu ft/s)

Basin features
- Progression: Wahig–Inabanga
- Tributaries
  - right: Danao, Dagohoy
- Waterbodies: Reservoir of Pilar Dam

The Inabanga River is the largest river in Bohol, Philippines. It is 25 kilometres (16 mi) long and up to 7 to 10 metres (23 to 33 ft) deep at its mouth at the town of Inabanga.

Its name means "Rented River", from the root word abang which means "rent". Due to drownings and attacks by crocodiles (which used to inhabit the river), this loss of life was considered a rent for the use of the river.

In May 2017, the Inabanga River was used by heavily armed members of Abu Sayyaf for a planned incursion into Bohol.

== Course ==
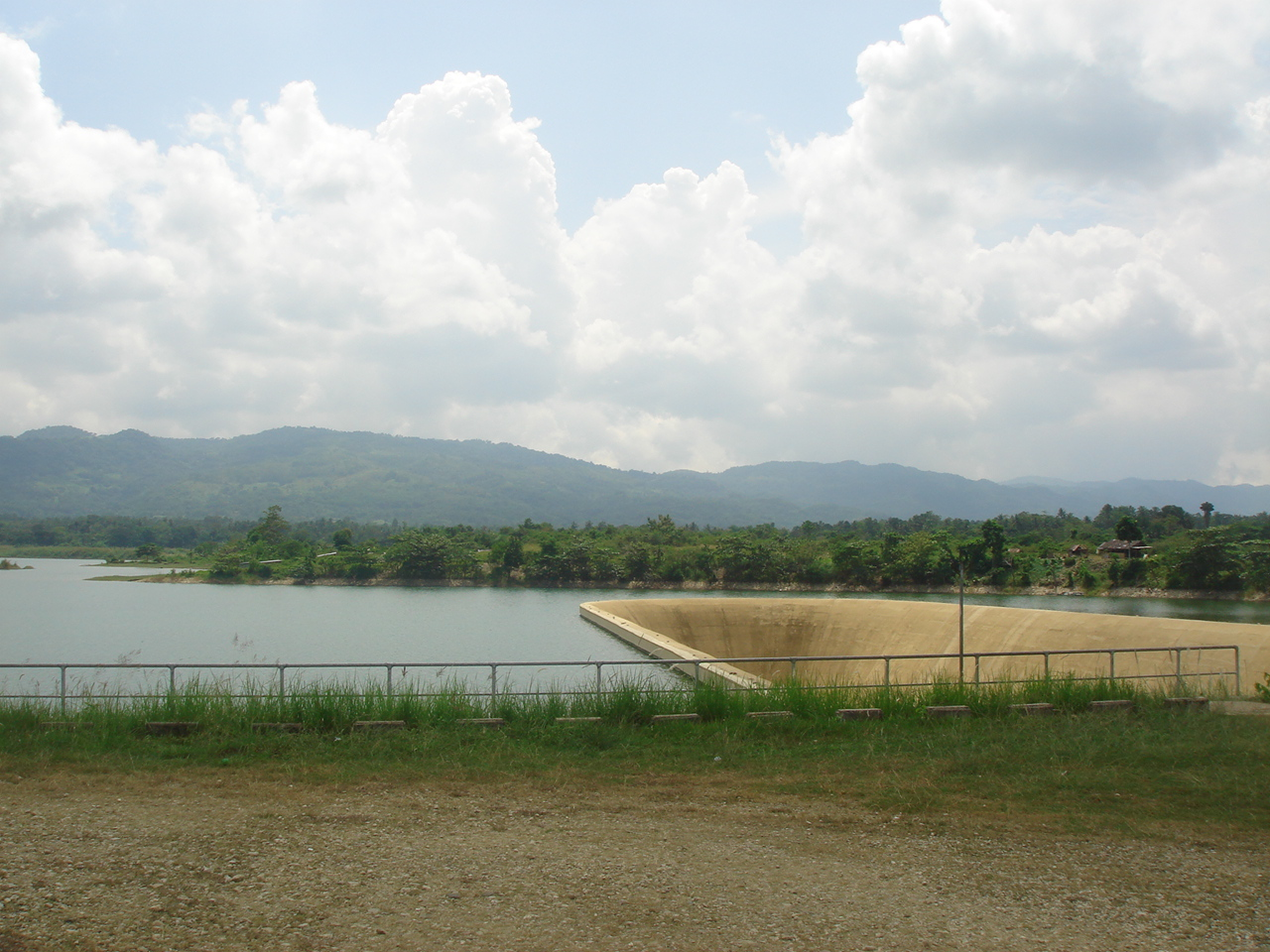
Pilar Dam and reservoir

Its sources, the Wahig and Pamacsalan Rivers, spring in the mountains of Sierra Bullones and flow into an irrigation reservoir behind the Pilar or Malinao Dam. From there the Inabanga River bisects Bohol before draining in the Cebu Strait in the north-western part of the island. The major tributaries are the Dagohoy, Danao, Wahig, and Pamacsalan Rivers. Other minor tributaries are the Mas-ing, Sagnap, and Malitbog Rivers. In 1905, the river was navigable up to 4.8 kilometres (3 mi) for boats drawing 6 ft, and up to 40 kilometres (25 mi) for rafts.

The coastal plain is one to two miles wide where the river banks are muddy and fringed in many places by nipa mangroves, which are used by locals for nipa plantation and harvesting. Further upstream the surrounding hills rise steeply.

The river's estuary is a productive habitat for invertebrates, fish, and birds, as well as spawning and nursery grounds for many species of fish, supports seagrass vegetation, shellfish beds, and nesting grounds for a variety of birds. The estuary is under threat from human development pressures such as fish pens, oyster farms, recreational use, and pollution.

== Watershed ==
The Inabanga River watershed is 627.93 square kilometres (242.45 sq mi) and covers all or parts of 15 municipalities in Bohol. It is mostly characterized by flat to rolling terrain, while some 35% of the watershed is very steep terrain, rising to 860 metres (2,820 ft) in Sierra Bullones. Land use is almost all farmland, with patches of grasslands, thickets and secondary forests. Forests cover only 14% of the basin. A small portion of it is protected in the Rajah Sikatuna Protected Landscape.

The major subbasins are the Dagohoy River basin (area of 216.37 km^{2}, 83.54 sq mi) and Danao River basin (area of 133.39 km^{2}, 51.50 sq mi), as well as the Wahig and Pamacsalan basin (area of 138.89 km^{2}, 53.63 sq mi).

The annual average rainfall is 4,598 millimetres (181.0 in) — 4,614 mm (181.7 in) in Pilar, 6,485 mm (255.3 in) in Dagohoy, and 2,682 mm (105.6 in) in Danao — which is equally distributed throughout the year.

== See also ==
Other significant rivers in Bohol:

- Abatan River
- Loboc River
