= Avicennia rumphiana =

Conservation status
- Vulnerable (IUCN 3.1)

Scientific classification
- Kingdom: Plantae
- Clade: Tracheophytes
- Clade: Angiosperms
- Clade: Eudicots
- Clade: Asterids
- Order: Lamiales
- Family: Acanthaceae
- Genus: Avicennia
- Species: A. rumphiana

Binomial name
- Avicennia rumphiana Hallier f.

Synonyms
- Avicennia marina var. rumphiana (Hallier f.) Bakh.

Species of flowering plant

Avicennia rumphiana is a species of tropical mangrove in the family Acanthaceae. It is considered vulnerable by the IUCN Red List of Threatened Species in the 2008 assessment. As of March 2022, Plants of the World Online considered it to be only a variety of Avicennia marina, Avicennia marina var. rumphiana. In the Malay language it is known as api api bulu.

== Description ==
Avicennia rumphiana is one of the tallest mangroves sometimes growing to 30 m (98 ft) tall with a girth of 3 m (10 ft) but is usually much smaller than this. The trunk has buttresses and roots which spread shallowly across the substrate and send up numerous pneumatophores. These are short vertical roots and are used for gas exchange. The bark is smooth and a dark shade of grey. The leaves are in opposite pairs, oval, sometimes spoon-shaped, glossy green above and yellowish-brown felted beneath. The individual flowers are over 1 cm (0.4 in) across and in a globular cluster, both calyx and petals being hairy. The fruit capsules are also felted and contain a single seed.

== Distribution and habitat ==
Avicennia rumphiana is endemic to south east Asia. Its range includes Malaysia, the Philippines, Indonesia and Papua New Guinea. It grows on the upper half of the foreshore preferring sandy or firm mud substrates.

== Status ==
Avicennia rumphiana is a fast-growing species and one of the first to colonize new areas. The IUCN Red List of Threatened Species considers it is vulnerable because it has a patchy distribution, is uncommon in some areas and is in general decline. It grows in the upper part of the intertidal zone where it is most vulnerable to human activities and habitat destruction. In the event of rising sea levels, as is expected to happen due to global warming, mangrove zones will be displaced upwards on the beach.

== Uses ==
Avicennia rumphiana is one of a number of species of mangrove planted for coastal defence. The timber is used for building construction but makes poor firewood, only being used for smoking fish and other products. The flowers produce plenty of nectar which is collected by foraging bees to make honey. The seeds are eaten as a boiled vegetable.

== Etymology ==
The generic name is in honour of the Mediaeval Persian physician Avicenna (980–1037). The specific name is in honour of the German-born Dutch-speaking naturalist Georg Eberhard Rumphius (Georg Eberhard Rumpf, 1627–1702) who studied the natural history of eastern Indonesia while working there for the Dutch East India Company.
