= Armadillo-class tanker =

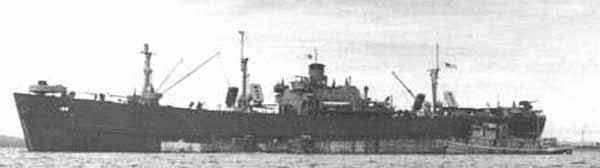
- USS Porcupine, an Armadillo-class tanker

Class overview
- Builders: California Shipbuilding Corporation, Delta Shipbuilding Company
- Operators: United States Navy, Maritime Commission
- In service: 18 November 1943 - 12 July 1946
- Completed: 20
- Canceled: 2 converted to Stag-class distilling ships
- Lost: 1
- Retired: 17

General characteristics
- Type: Liberty tanker
- Tonnage: 7,219 GRT; 10,674 DWT
- Displacement: 14,245 tons
- Length: 441 ft 6 in (135 m) overall; 427 ft (130 m) waterline; 417 ft 9 in (127 m) between perpendiculars
- Beam: 57 ft (17 m)
- Draft: 27 ft 9 in (8 m)
- Propulsion: 2,500 hp (1,900 kW)
- Speed: 11 knots (20 km/h; 13 mph)
- Capacity: 272,978 cu ft (7,729.9 m^{3}; 48,619.5 bbl)
- Complement: 81 officers and enlisted
- Armament: Typically 1 × 5-inch 38 caliber dual-purpose gun; 1 × 3 in (76 mm) gun; 8 × 20 mm cannons

The Armadillo class of tankers was a class of Type Z-ET1-S-C3 Liberty ship, that were commissioned into the United States Navy. They were given the hull classification symbols of unclassified miscellaneous vessels. Two would be converted to Stag-class distilling ships

This group of Liberty based tankers all served in the United States Navy during the Second World War. Each ship was commissioned in late 1943, and decommissioned in the summer of 1946. These ships primarily served in the Asiatic-Pacific theater - Pacific Ocean Areas and the South West Pacific Area. These ships brought aviation gasoline to remote islands in the south Pacific, required for the many aerial reconnaissance missions there. Camel served primarily in the Central Pacific Area.

== Notable incident ==
- USS Porcupine sank due to an enemy kamikaze attack on 30 December 1944 at Mangarin Bay, Leyte, Philippines.
