= Lithic =

Lithic may refer to:

- Relating to stone tools
  - Lithic analysis, the analysis of stone tools and other chipped stone artifacts
  - Lithic core, the part of a stone which has had flakes removed from it
  - Lithic flake, the portion of a rock removed to make a tool
  - Lithic reduction, the process of removing flakes from a stone to make a tool
  - Lithic technology, the array of techniques to produce tools from stone
- Lithic fragment (geology), pieces of rock, eroded to sand size, and now sand grains in a sedimentary rock
- Lithic sandstone, sandstone with a significant component of (above) lithic fragments
- Lithic stage, the North American prehistoric period before 10,000 years ago

== See also ==
- Stone Age
  - Paleolithic
  - Mesolithic
  - Neolithic
- Stone carving
