= USS Pasig (AW-3) =

Water distilling ship

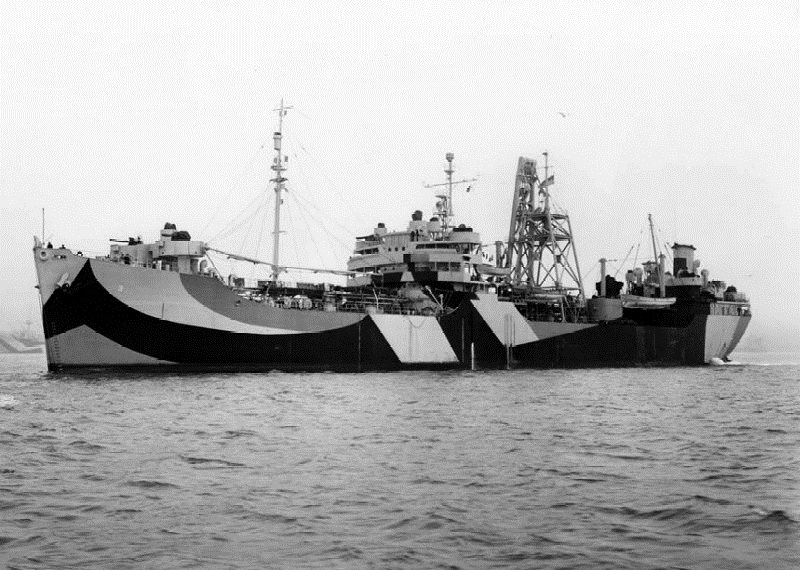
- USS Pasig (AW-3) in 1945.

History

United States
- Name: USS Pasig
- Namesake: Pasig River in the Philippines
- Builder: Marinship Corporation, Sausalito, California
- Laid down: 18 May 1944
- Launched: 15 July 1944
- Commissioned: 11 December 1944
- Decommissioned: February 1947
- Recommissioned: 15 March 1951
- Decommissioned: 15 June 1955
- Stricken: 1 July 1960
- Honors and awards: 6 battle stars (Korea)
- Fate: Sold for scrapping 16 October 1975.

General characteristics
- Type: Pasig-class distilling ship
- Displacement: 6,640 long tons (6,747 t) light; 23,350 long tons (23,725 t) full
- Length: 523 ft 6 in (159.56 m)
- Beam: 68 ft (21 m)
- Draft: 30 ft 10 in (9.40 m)
- Installed power: 3,000 shp (2,237 kW)
- Propulsion: Turbo-electric drive, single propeller
- Speed: 14 knots (26 km/h; 16 mph)
- Complement: 265 officers and enlisted
- Armament: 1 × 5"/38 caliber gun; 4 × 3"/50 caliber guns; 4 × twin 40 mm guns; 4 × twin 20 mm guns

USS Pasig (AW-3) was one of four water distilling ships built for the United States Navy during World War II. The lead ship in her class, she was named for the Pasig River (the second U.S. Naval vessel to bear the name) which flows through Manila on the Island of Luzon, Philippines.

Originally laid down as SS Mission San Xavier, a Maritime Commission T2-SE-A2 tanker (MC hull 1826) by the Marinship Corporation of Sausalito, California on 18 May 1944; renamed USS Pasig (AO–91) on 3 July 1944; launched on 15 July 1944, sponsored by Mrs. John A. McCone; redesignated USS Pasig (AW–3) on 28 August 1944; acquired by the Navy from the Maritime Commission on 21 October 1944; and commissioned on 11 December 1944.

== Service history ==
=== World War II, 1944–1947 ===
Following shakedown off California, Pasig sailed on 3 March 1945 to begin her mission of distilling and supplying fresh water to units of the Allied navies in the western Pacific. She arrived at Ulithi on 23 March and immediately commenced supplying water to landing craft, preparing for the Okinawa campaign, merchant vessels, and various harbor craft. With no natural water supply at Ulithi, Pasig refilled periodically from tankers from the Philippines, or made trips to the closest natural source. On 7 May she departed for a water run to Manus, whence, redirected, she steamed northeast to Eniwetok. There she joined ServDiv 102 and continued to supply Pacific Fleet units, and bases ashore, with fresh water until ordered back to the United States for inactivation in late 1946. Decommissioned in February 1947, she was berthed at San Diego, California until war again broke out in the Far East.

=== Korean War, 1951–1955 ===
Recommissioned on 15 March 1951 Pasig reported to MSTS WestPac at Yokosuka in April. For 37 continuous months her 120,000 gallon/day distilling plant provided fresh water, for human and machine consumption, to units of the United Nations forces operating in Korean and Japanese waters. In 1954 she was again designated for inactivation and, in May, she departed Yokosuka for the West Coast.

=== Decommissioning ===
Decommissioned for the last time on 15 June 1955, she entered the Pacific Reserve Fleet, where she remained until transferred to the Maritime Administration's National Defense Reserve Fleet at Olympia, Washington in June 1960. On 1 July 1960 Pasig's name was struck from the Naval Vessel Register. Final Disposition, sold for scrapping, 16 October 1975, to Levin Metals Corp.

== Awards ==
Pasig received 6 battle stars for her service during the Korean War.
