= Distilling ship =

Desalination facility in navy fleets

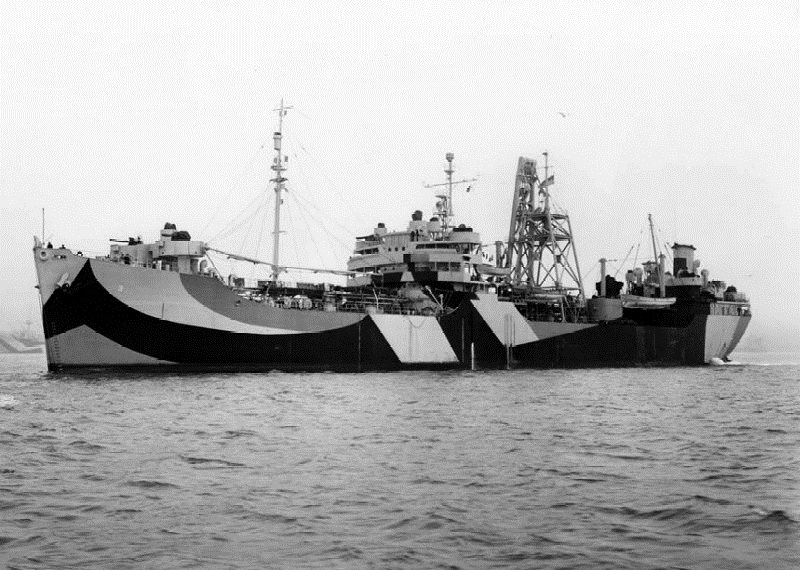
The distilling ship USS Pasig (AW-3) was converted from a T2-SE-A2 tanker.

A distilling ship is a class of military ships, generally converted tankers, with the capability to convert salt water into fresh water. They were typically stationed at forward bases during conflict where they supported on-the-ground troops and front line naval units.

== Kleinschmidt still ==
While steamships often used the heat in low-pressure steam exhausted from propulsion machinery to distill fresh water from seawater, that was relatively inefficient when the ship was not underway. Dr. R.V. Kleinschmidt developed a compression still while working at the Arthur D. Little Laboratories in Cambridge, Massachusetts. These stills were manufactured for the United States Navy by E. B. Badger and Sons of Boston. After these Kleinschmidt stills proved successful aboard diesel engined ships like submarines, destroyer escorts, and tank landing ships, several stills were placed aboard tankers built as distilling ships.

Seawater enters the evaporation chamber through two heat exchangers. The evaporation chamber has an electrical heating element used to initially heat the seawater during startup, and the resulting steam is run through a rotary compressor which increases the steam temperature while creating a vacuum over the seawater in the evaporation chamber to lower the boiling temperature of seawater. The compressed steam is then piped though the evaporation chamber as the primary source of heat so the heating element becomes unnecessary for sustained operation. The compressor maintains a pressure difference of approximately 3 psi (21 kPa) between the boiling seawater and condensing steam which translates to an approximate temperature difference of 5 °C (9 °F) across the tube walls within the evaporation chamber. Steam condensed while evaporating the seawater is removed as fresh water through one of the heat exchangers pre-heating the incoming seawater, and about twenty percent of the incoming seawater leaves the evaporation chamber as hot brine pumped overboard through another heat exchanger.

== Operational experience ==
These ships frequently operated in tropical harbors where seawater contained appreciable quantities of pollutants. Some of these pollutants would be carried through the compressor as mist from the boiling seawater, and the temperature of the distillation process was inadequate to sterilize the fresh water. Some microorganisms carried through to the fresh water were pathogenic, while others colonized the ships' fresh water tanks using nutrients carried through the compressors to cause taste and odor problems making the water unpalatable. Microbial growth was rapid in the warm water of the tropics. The United States Navy crew would include a naval surgeon to test and maintain water quality.

A newly cleaned still would produce about 200 gallons of fresh water per gallon of diesel fuel powering the compressor, but accumulation of scale on the brine side of the steam pipes within the evaporation chamber and seawater heat exchanger would typically reduce efficiency to about 100 gallons of water per gallon of fuel after 700 hours of operation.

== See also ==
- List of Distilling Ships (AW) of the USN
