= Cabilao Island =

Island in the Philippines

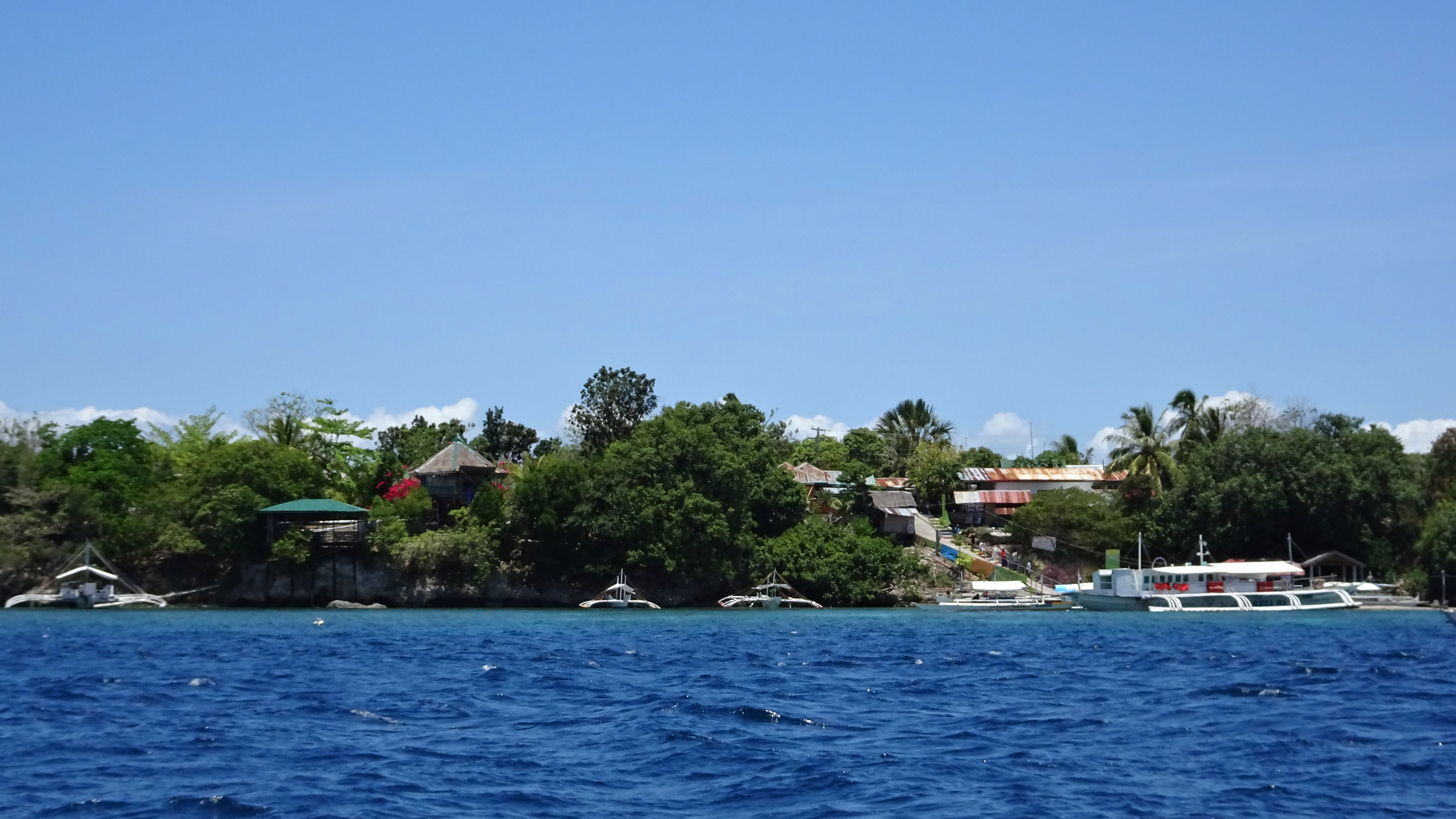

- Location in Visayas Location in the Philippines
- Interactive map of Cabilao Island

Geography
- Coordinates: 9°52′40″N 123°46′20″E
- Archipelago: Visayas
- Area: 7.66 km^{2} (2.96 sq mi)

Administration
- Philippines
- Region: Central Visayas
- Province: Bohol
- Municipality: Loon

Demographics
- Population: 4,636 (2020 census)
- Pop. density: 610/km^{2} (1580/sq mi)

Cabilao is a Philippine island in the Cebu Strait, part of Bohol Province. It is home to the only natural lake in the province: Cabilao Island Lake, also called Lake Lanao.

The island, part of the Municipality of Loon, has five barangays (Cabacongan, Cambaquiz, Looc, Pantudlan, and Talisay), and has a total population of 4,636 people, who primarily depend on fishing and agriculture, as well as tourism.

Notable indigenous products are handcrafted mats,hats and bayongs, weaved from romblon (pandanus) leaves by a cooperation of weavers using a shared service facility in Pantudlan.

The entire island was proclaimed as a Mangrove Swamp Forest Reserve under Proclamation No. 2152 in 1981, and confirmed by the National Integrated Protected Areas System (NIPAS) Act of 1992 (Republic Act No. 7586). But since only a small area around Cabilao Island Lake actually has any mangroves worthy of being protected, House Bill No. 5108 of February 2017 removed the island's protection under the NIPAS Act. Proclamation No. 1801, signed in November 1978, declared the entire island a tourist zone and marine reserve under the administration and control of the Philippine Tourism Authority (PTA).

The island is accessible by outrigger boats that connect Mocpoc on the western end of Sandingan Island to the pier on the eastern side of Cabilao Island. There are only a number of cars on the island, and local transportation consists of motorcycles and a few tricycles.

== Attractions ==
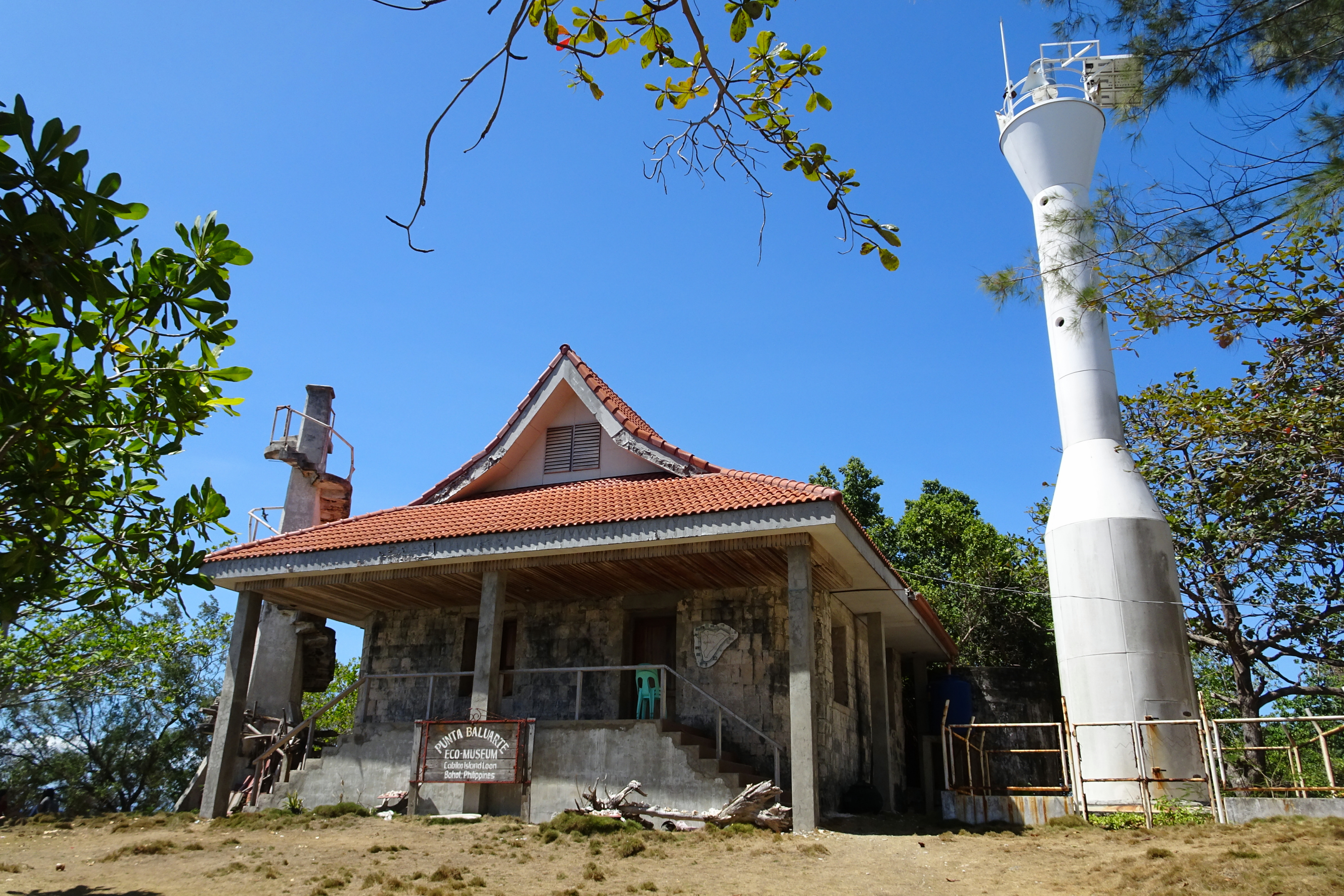
Punta Baluarte

The main tourist attraction of Cabilao Island is scuba diving and snorkeling. There are several diving locations with undisturbed coral reefs, that are home to barracudas, jackfish, ghostpipe fish, dragon fish, crabs, seahorses, damsel fish, fusiliers, parrot fish, and occasionally hammerhead and white-tipped sharks. Other attractions include a few sandy beaches, and bird watching. Since bird hunting is prohibited, there are more bird species on Cabilao Island than any other place in Bohol.

On the north-west corner of the island, known as Punta Baluarte, are a small museum, an old abandoned lighthouse and modern lighthouse. The museum is housed in the former ruins of the Spanish-era lighthouse building with 1-metre-thick coral stone walls, that was restored in 2011. Nearby are the ruins of a Spanish-era stone watchtower of which only the foundations remain.
