= Loon, Bohol =

Municipality in Bohol, Philippines

Loon
- Municipality
- Municipality of Loon
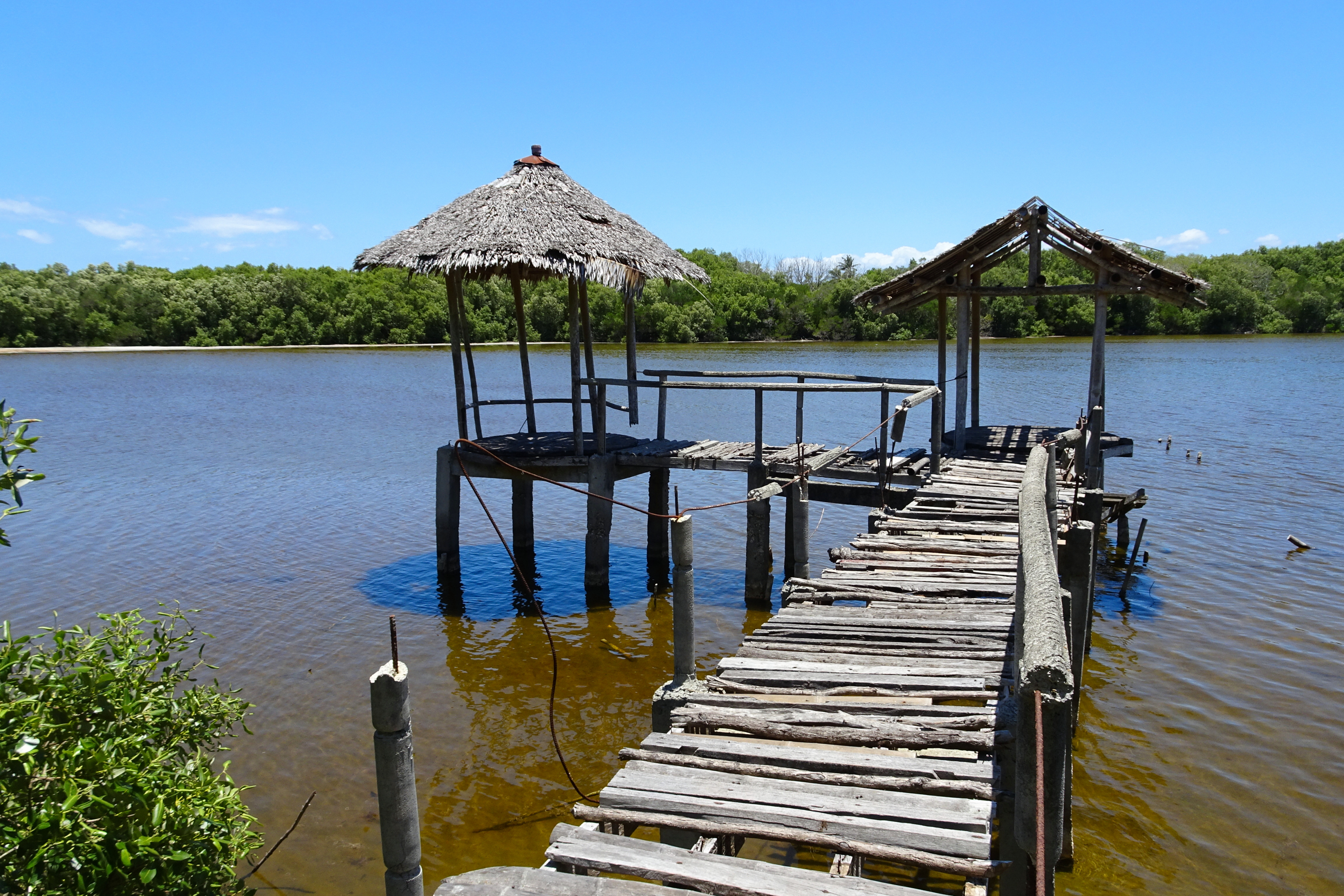
- Loon Church Cabilao Island Lake Loon Plaza

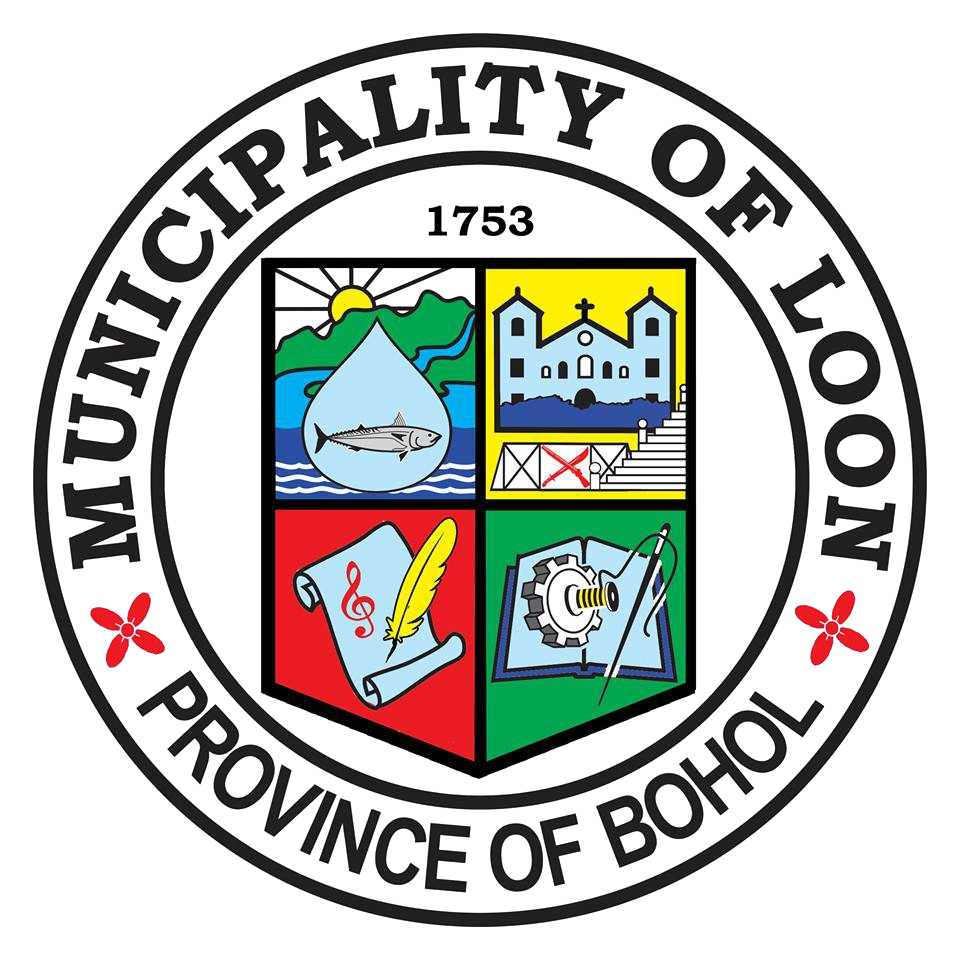
- Seal

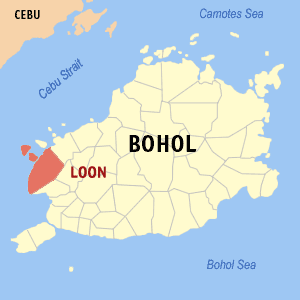
- Map of Bohol with Loon highlighted
- Interactive map of Loon
- Location within the Philippines
- Coordinates: 9°48′N 123°48′E
- Country: Philippines
- Region: Central Visayas
- Province: Bohol
- District: 1st district
- Founded: June 22, 1753
- Barangays: 67 (see Barangays)

Government
  - Type: Sangguniang Bayan
  - Mayor: Cesar Tomas "Yul" Lopez
  - Vice Mayor: Pedro “Dodong” Literatus
  - Representative: John Geesnell “Baba” Yap
  - Municipal Council: Members: Jorge J. Marapao Jr.; Emerson S. Relampagos; Marie Hazel R. Saavedra; Rainelda M. Gutierrez; Willou C. Tan; Jeanette M. Vidal; Ruel L. Legitimas; Kristel P. Tecson
  - Electorate: 30,645 voters (2025)

Area
  - Total: 125.38 km^{2} (48.41 sq mi)
- Elevation: 89 m (292 ft)
- Highest elevation: 449 m (1,473 ft)
- Lowest elevation: 0 m (0 ft)

Population (2024 census)
  - Total: 43,857
  - Density: 349.79/km^{2} (905.96/sq mi)
  - Households: 10,696

Economy
  - Income class: 1st municipal income class
  - Poverty incidence: 17.38% (2023)
  - Revenue: ₱ 242.1 million (2024)
  - Assets: ₱ 758.5 million (2024)
  - Expenditure: ₱ 93.53 million (2024)
  - Liabilities: ₱ 71.67 million (2024)

Service provider
  - Electricity: Bohol 1 Electric Cooperative (BOHECO 1)
- Time zone: UTC+8 (PST)
- ZIP code: 6327
- PSGC: 0701230000
- IDD : area code: +63 (0)38
- Native languages: Boholano dialect Cebuano; Tagalog
- Website: www.loon.gov.ph

Loon, officially the Municipality of Loon (Cebuano: Munisipalidad sa Loon; Tagalog: Bayan ng Loon), is a municipality in the province of Bohol, Philippines which was established in 1753. According to the 2024 census, it had a population of 43,857 people.

== History ==
Loon was among the hardest hit towns in the 2013 Bohol earthquake. About a third of all casualties occurred in this town, and its church, dating from the 1850s, was completely leveled to the ground.

== Geography ==
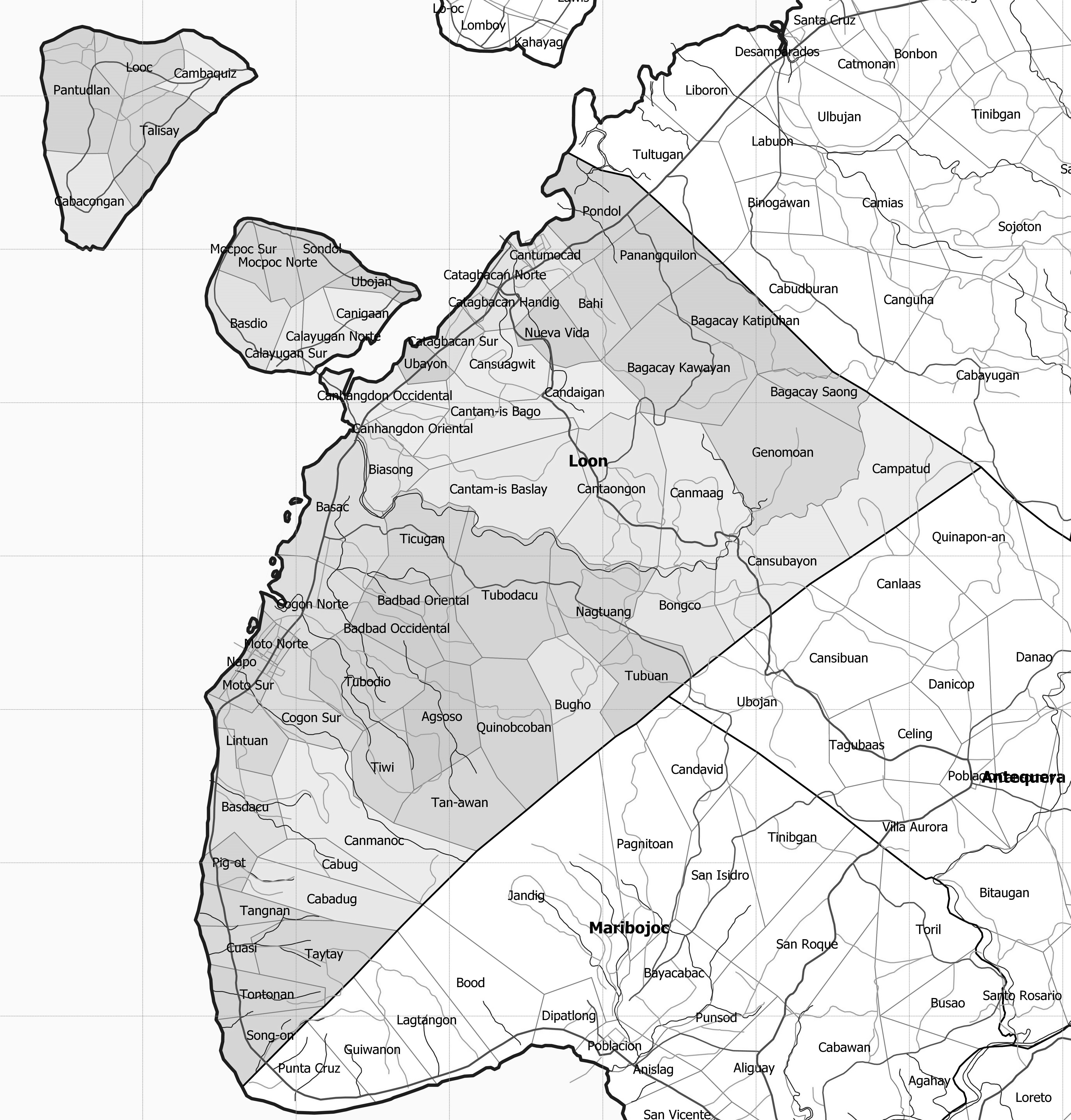
Map of Loon showing barangays and islands

The town proper of Loon is located about 28 kilometres (17 mi) north of Tagbilaran and is the westernmost municipality of Bohol. The Cabilao and Sandingan islands are part of the municipality. Lanao Lake on Cabilao island (also known as Cabilao Island Lake) is the only natural lake in Bohol.

Loon lies halfway between Tagbilaran and Tubigon, Bohol's major ports of entry, each of which is only 40 minutes away by public utility buses, jeepneys and vans-for-hire that frequently ply the north–south route. Loon has one provincial secondary port and six fishing ports. The secondary port is being converted into the Loon Bohol International Cruise Ship Port. Currently it serves the Loon—Argao (Cebu) route.

=== Topography ===
Loon is composed of land mass, coastlines and natural waters and has a relatively rolling topography consisting of moderate hills, rolling plains, sparse plateaus interspersed with valleys, and some ravines.

=== Climate ===
Climate data for Loon, Bohol
Month	Jan	Feb	Mar	Apr	May	Jun	Jul	Aug	Sep	Oct	Nov	Dec	Year
Mean daily maximum °C (°F)	28 (82)	29 (84)	30 (86)	31 (88)	31 (88)	30 (86)	30 (86)	30 (86)	30 (86)	29 (84)	29 (84)	29 (84)	30 (85)
Mean daily minimum °C (°F)	23 (73)	22 (72)	23 (73)	23 (73)	24 (75)	25 (77)	24 (75)	24 (75)	24 (75)	24 (75)	23 (73)	23 (73)	24 (74)
Average precipitation mm (inches)	102 (4.0)	85 (3.3)	91 (3.6)	75 (3.0)	110 (4.3)	141 (5.6)	121 (4.8)	107 (4.2)	111 (4.4)	144 (5.7)	169 (6.7)	139 (5.5)	1,395 (55.1)
Average rainy days	18.6	14.8	16.5	16.7	23.9	26.4	25.6	24.1	24.4	26.3	23.7	20.5	261.5
Source: Meteoblue (Use with caution: this is modeled/calculated data, not measured locally.)

=== Barangays ===
Loon is politically subdivided into 67 barangays. Each barangay consists of puroks and some have sitios.

PSGC	Barangay	Population			±% p.a.		Etymology
		2024		2010			
071223001	Agsoso	0.7%	298	254	▴	1.10%	soso a freshwater shellfish species
071223002	Badbad Occidental	0.8%	347	279	▴	1.51%	badba-an a local shrub or tree
071223003	Badbad Oriental	1.1%	471	509	▾	−0.53%	badba-an a local shrub or tree
071223004	Bagacay Katipuhan	0.4%	179	189	▾	−0.37%	bagakay or bamboo abundant in the area katipuhan a place where "tipolo" trees grew in abundance kawayan a bamboo thicket beside a small pool of mud where carabaos wallow saong a tree species whose sap thought similar to paste used in the making of Noah's Ark
071223005	Bagacay Kawayan	0.9%	373	427	▾	−0.92%	bagakay or bamboo abundant in the area katipuhan a place where "tipolo" trees grew in abundance kawayan a bamboo thicket beside a small pool of mud where carabaos wallow saong a tree species whose sap thought similar to paste used in the making of Noah's Ark
071223006	Bagacay Saong	0.4%	163	137	▴	1.20%	bagakay or bamboo abundant in the area katipuhan a place where "tipolo" trees grew in abundance kawayan a bamboo thicket beside a small pool of mud where carabaos wallow saong a tree species whose sap thought similar to paste used in the making of Noah's Ark
071223007	Bahi	1.0%	446	367	▴	1.35%	bahi the hard portion of the trunk of a "pugahan" palm
071223008	Basac	3.4%	1,490	1,414	▴	0.36%	basac from the visayan word "basa", which means "wet" and many years passed by, turned into "basac"
071223009	Basdacu	2.1%	912	962	▾	−0.37%	ba'as means sand daku means big; wide shoreline of the barangay diyo means small; a patch of sand on its shoreline
071223010	Basdio	1.2%	541	561	▾	−0.25%	ba'as means sand daku means big; wide shoreline of the barangay diyo means small; a patch of sand on its shoreline
071223011	Biasong	0.7%	323	323	Steady	0.00%	biasong: a variety of orange grown near the Moalong River
071223012	Bongco	0.9%	415	328	▴	1.63%	trabongko: a legendary shining ball that giant snakes amused at night
071223013	Bugho	0.6%	243	285	▾	−1.09%	bugho or hole, references to the ravines and gorges of the barangay
071223014	Cabacongan	2.2%	977	1,080	▾	−0.69%	after the plant bakong
071223015	Cabadug	0.6%	276	231	▴	1.23%	land purportedly belonging (Ca) to the first inhabitant named Badug
071223016	Cabug	0.5%	213	185	▴	0.97%	kabug bats hanging from the branches of "tipolo" trees
071223017	Calayugan Norte	1.6%	704	737	▾	−0.31%	after the swaying coconut trees which looked like fighting (ga‑layug)
071223018	Calayugan Sur	1.1%	503	538	▾	−0.46%	after the swaying coconut trees which looked like fighting (ga‑layug)
071223020	Cambaquiz	1.9%	828	1,042	▾	−1.57%	ba's nga nag-ekis-ekis or sand that crosses from one side to other depending on the waves. (A popular yet wrong tale means "come back and kiss".)
071223021	Campatud	0.9%	415	365	▴	0.89%	patud a spring in a thick forest where hunters go
071223022	Candaigan	1.0%	425	477	▾	−0.79%	legendary ever-burning stump of dead tree to kindle (daig) lamps
071223023	Canhangdon Occidental	1.9%	836	848	▾	−0.10%	kanhangdon root word is "hangad" or to look up from the Moalong River
071223024	Canhangdon Oriental	1.3%	550	549	▴	0.01%	kanhangdon root word is "hangad" or to look up from the Moalong River
071223025	Canigaan	1.8%	770	826	▾	−0.48%	nigaran a legendary place where big niga trees grew
071223019	Canmaag	0.9%	405	404	▴	0.02%	mamag or tarsier, which were plentiful
071223026	Canmanoc	0.7%	289	319	▾	−0.68%	manok where wild chickens abound
071223027	Cansuagwit	0.8%	356	291	▴	1.39%	after a spring of the same name
071223028	Cansubayon	1.1%	474	505	▾	−0.43%	subayon the act of walking the banks of creeks
071223032	Cantam‑is Bago	0.5%	236	284	▾	−1.26%	tam-is means sweet bago is a vegetable baslay the name of a spring
071223035	Cantam‑is Baslay	0.8%	371	495	▾	−1.96%	tam-is means sweet bago is a vegetable baslay the name of a spring
071223033	Cantaongon	2.3%	1,010	970	▴	0.28%	taongon tree was abundant
071223034	Cantumocad	1.9%	848	852	▾	−0.03%	sondo a creek where one needs to take a leap (tukad)
071223029	Catagbacan Handig	2.4%	1,063	994	▴	0.46%	tagbak means to barter or exchange goods katagbacan is a location where barter takes place handig a location on slopes that rise from the plain
071223030	Catagbacan Norte	2.9%	1,267	1,186	▴	0.45%	tagbak means to barter or exchange goods katagbacan is a location where barter takes place handig a location on slopes that rise from the plain
071223031	Catagbacan Sur	2.4%	1,070	973	▴	0.65%	tagbak means to barter or exchange goods katagbacan is a location where barter takes place handig a location on slopes that rise from the plain
071223036	Cogon Norte (Poblacion)	4.6%	2,020	1,907	▴	0.40%	kogon grass
071223037	Cogon Sur	1.0%	430	425	▴	0.08%	kogon grass
071223038	Cuasi	2.6%	1,150	1,115	▴	0.21%	"Kawasi!", an order to disembark or jump overboard (to save the cargo)
071223039	Genomoan	0.7%	312	362	▾	−1.02%	the legend says an ill farmer called out because his carabao was hinomolan (wallowing in the river)
071223040	Lintuan	2.1%	941	913	▴	0.21%	tuwang-tuwang, the changing movement of sand blown by south and north winds
071223041	Looc	1.9%	839	1,070	▾	−1.66%	the curved shape of its coastline na lo-ok
071223042	Mocpoc Norte	1.7%	743	875	▾	−1.12%	pok-pok, the warning drum hung from a mangrove tree (pagatpat) when Moros pirate kumpits were coming
071223043	Mocpoc Sur	1.3%	565	646	▾	−0.92%	pok-pok, the warning drum hung from a mangrove tree (pagatpat) when Moros pirate kumpits were coming
071223050	Moto Norte (Poblacion)	2.9%	1,285	1,369	▾	−0.43%	moto or hill, located above the original settlement, the coastal barangay of Napo
071223051	Moto Sur (Poblacion)	2.9%	1,283	1,225	▴	0.32%	moto or hill, located above the original settlement, the coastal barangay of Napo
071223044	Nagtuang	1.3%	578	493	▴	1.10%	nagatuwang whereby flow of water from a spring is absorbed higher
071223045	Napo (Poblacion)	3.2%	1,394	1,342	▴	0.26%	napolo or napo'o means place formed from sand
071223046	Nueva Vida	0.7%	294	263	▴	0.77%	Spanish for 'new life'; the new settlement built when Catagbacan became too big
071223047	Panangquilon	1.0%	453	496	▾	−0.62%	panankilon, a medicinal herb
071223048	Pantudlan	1.9%	841	808	▴	0.28%	from tulod-tulod the thrusting action of the waves shifting sand by the wind blow
071223049	Pig‑ot	1.6%	694	592	▴	1.10%	pi-ot the narrow stretch of road which widened by blasting, resulting in the fleeing of the monkeys from their habitat
071223052	Pondol	3.6%	1,593	1,476	▴	0.53%	pundo-pundo or pondol juts into the sea or pools of water
071223053	Quinobcoban	0.4%	176	185	▾	−0.34%	kinubkoban holes dug looking for sources of water.
071223054	Sondol	1.6%	692	690	▴	0.02%	sondol or donsol, a sea slug species abundant in its seashore
071223055	Song‑on	1.6%	686	683	▴	0.03%	so-ongon, an arch-like rock formation along the shoreline; where one has to stoop (so-ong) to pass
071223056	Talisay	2.7%	1,178	1,310	▾	−0.73%	talisay trees which growing on cliffs over the shoreline
071223057	Tan‑awan	0.3%	119	110	▴	0.54%	tan-awan means a place where one gets a good view of the villages below it
071223058	Tangnan	2.0%	857	867	▾	−0.08%	tangnan is cave that contains fresh water
071223059	Taytay	0.7%	323	292	▴	0.70%	taytay a bridge, narrow hilltop-located pathway that leads to the center of the village
071223060	Ticugan	0.9%	381	373	▴	0.15%	tikog plant whose leaf strips can be woven into mats
071223061	Tiwi	0.3%	144	112	▴	1.74%	tiwi the trees that once grew on the eastern part
071223062	Tontonan	1.6%	696	607	▴	0.94%	tontonan means to use a rope (tonton) to scale a high mountain
071223063	Tubodacu	0.9%	415	395	▴	0.34%	tubod means spring daku means big diyo means small
071223064	Tubodio	0.5%	241	207	▴	1.05%	tubod means spring daku means big diyo means small
071223065	Tubuan	0.7%	317	285	▴	0.73%	tuburan is a spring
071223066	Ubayon	1.6%	707	635	▴	0.74%	nag-ubay sa baybayon means straddling the shoreline
071223067	Ubojan	1.4%	600	486	▴	1.46%	ulbohan a well where water gushed in spurts (ga ulbo-ulbo)
	Total		43,857	42,800	▴	0.17%	

== Demographics ==
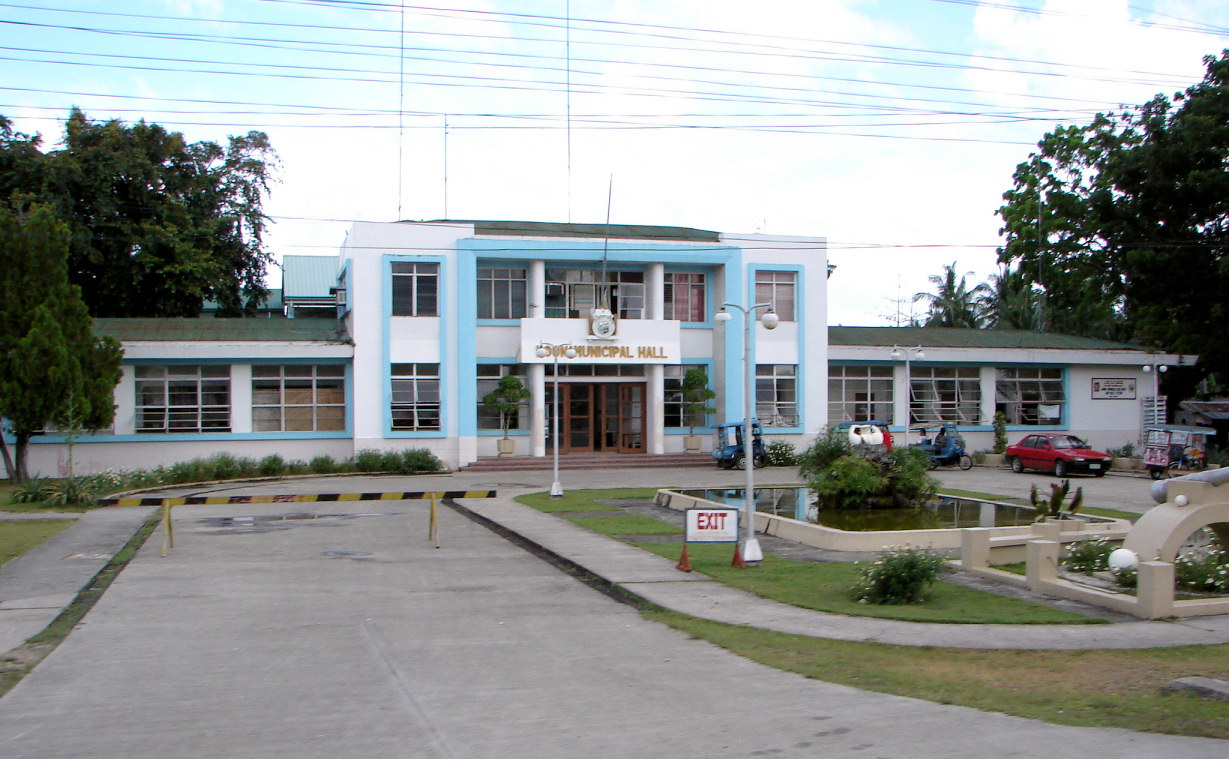
Municipal Building

Population census of Loon

Year	Pop.	±% p.a.
1903	18,114	—
1918	23,713	+1.81%
1939	28,799	+0.93%
1948	29,683	+0.34%
1960	30,370	+0.19%
1970	33,153	+0.88%

Year	Pop.	±% p.a.
1975	34,225	+0.64%
1980	35,643	+0.81%
1990	34,400	−0.35%
1995	32,716	−0.94%
2000	45,215	+7.18%
2007	42,441	−0.87%

Year	Pop.	±% p.a.
2010	42,800	+0.31%
2015	43,034	+0.10%
2020	44,224	+0.58%
2024	43,857	−0.20%

Source: Philippine Statistics Authority

== Economy ==
Poverty incidence of Loon (%)

Source: Philippine Statistics Authority

Gross Annual Income (2014): ₱63.2 million

Major industries: agriculture, fishery, cottage (ready-to-wear clothes, mats, baskets), transportation, trading, tourism

Loon's public markets include two main public markets and five barangay/feeder markets. There are more than 800 business establishments and entrepreneurs in Loon.

== Indigenous culture and crafts ==
- Processing of "binago", grated and dried cassava steamed over a perforated coconut half-shell fitted onto the mouth of an earthen pot half-filled with water; common in the barangays on Sandingan and Cabilao islands and in Ubayon.
- Production of "tubâ" or toddy from coconut in Cantaongon and other upland barangays.
- "Drama" or community theater in Napo, a fervently sustained local tradition that originated during the Spanish period. Local residents get involved as actors, singers, directors, stage managers and playwrights.
- Weaving of mats from romblon palm in Cabilao; production of nypa shingles near Moalong River; and weaving of baskets and other handicrafts from bamboo, rattan, baliw, nito, sig‑id, sagisi and other materials in some upland barangays
- Christmas caroling: "Daygon", "Pastores" and "Igi‑igi"
- Good Friday dawn pilgrimage to Big Cross
- Good Friday procession and Easter "Sugat/Hugos" rites in the town center
- September "Festival of Lights" or "SidlaKasilak" in honor of the town's patroness
- Town fiesta on 8 September and barangay fiestas throughout the year.

== Tourism ==
=== Heritage and historical sites ===
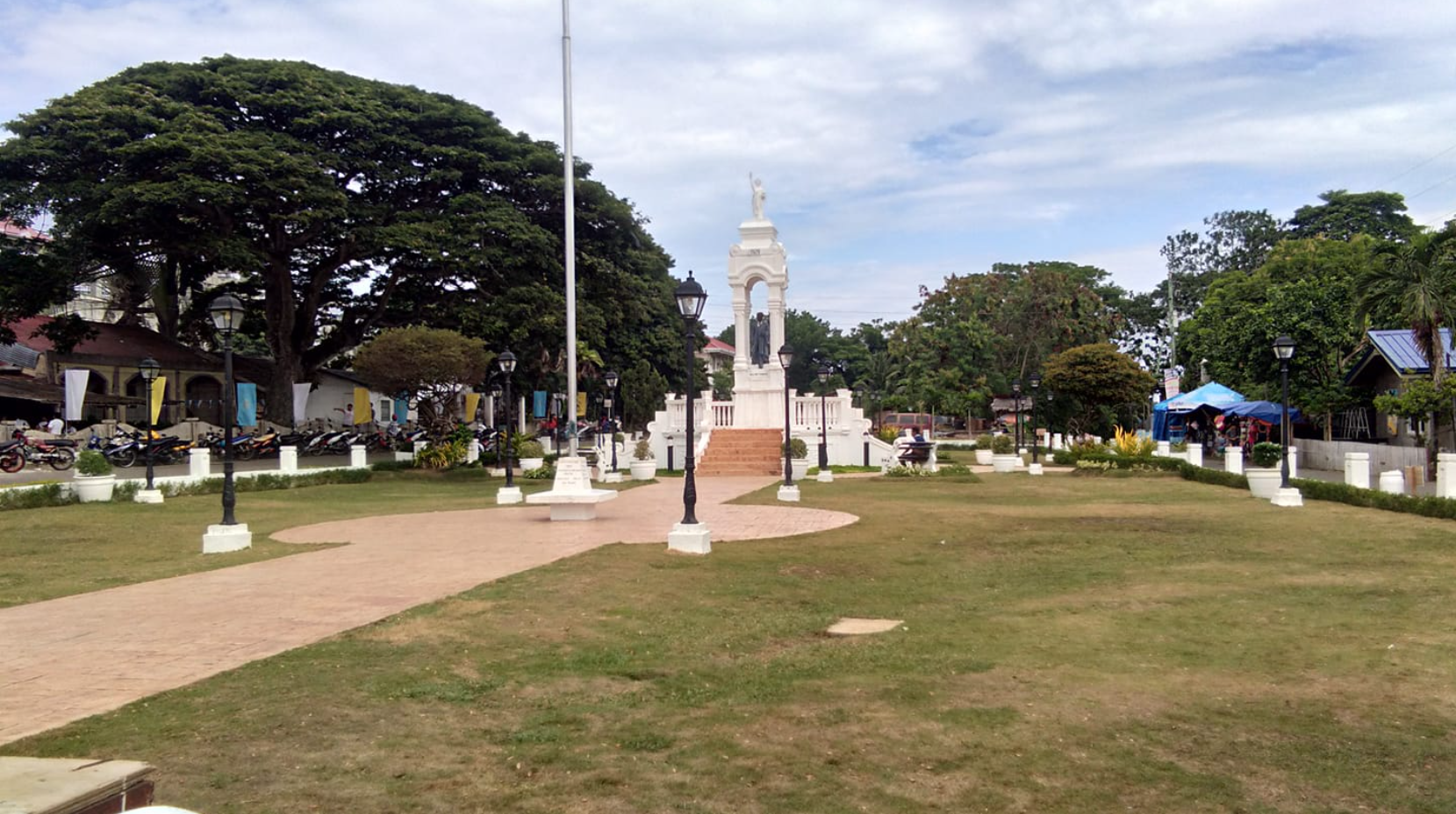
Loon Public Plaza

- Inang-Angan Stairway
  Inang-angan (grand stairway of coral stone blocks, 212 steps): A National Cultural Treasure
- Sombria Bridge: stone bridge with the highest elevation among colonial bridges in the province.
- Napo Ruins: former residence of the Saiz family
- Ferandos House: ancestral house (chalet) built during the American period.
- Gabaldon building: the main building of Loon South Central Elementary School built in 1915.
- Loon Public Plaza
- Big Cross: a pilgrimage site marked by a Big Cross on the slopes Cabug offers a majestic view of the Cebu Strait. A road leading to the place features replicas of the 14 Stations of the Cross.
- Virgen de la Paz Hermitage: home of the Virgen de la Paz hermit nuns that sits on a cliff that overlooking the mangroves and marine sanctuary in Tangnan and offers an unobstructed view of the sea and the blue mountains of Cebu.
- Solar-powered Lighthouse: located in Punta Baluarte in Pantudlan, Cabilao Island, this modern lighthouse is a donation of the Spanish government and stands beside the old one retained for its historical value.
- Punta Baluarte Eco-Museum: a Spanish-era bulwark on Cabilao Island that has been transformed into an eco-cultural museum
- Mesina House: the only remaining ancestral house of such design. With some families experiencing early the economic boom brought about by success in the retail business, mostly in Leyte, Samar, Negros and Mindanao, and in the practice of their professions, all the other old houses have been replaced with modern designs.

‡ Totally destroyed by the 15 October 2013 earthquake.

- Church of Nuestra Señora de la Luz (including old convent): A National Historical Landmark and National Cultural Treasure; completely restored in 2021
- Spanish-Era Mortuary Chapel: A National Cultural Treasure
- Spanish Colonial Cemetery (1800–1860s): A National Cultural Treasure
- Christ the King Monument: an imposing structure on the church plaza that features a figure of the Risen Christ atop a three-sided column at the center of an ornate and multi-layered circular base; completely restored
- The Grotto: depicts the scene in Lourdes, France where Mary appeared to a girl named Bernadette. It is a favorite backdrop for the annual reenactment of the Last Supper and many other photo opportunities
- Hugosan: a four-column platform serving as main gate of the church; used during Easter Sunday rites

=== Natural attractions ===
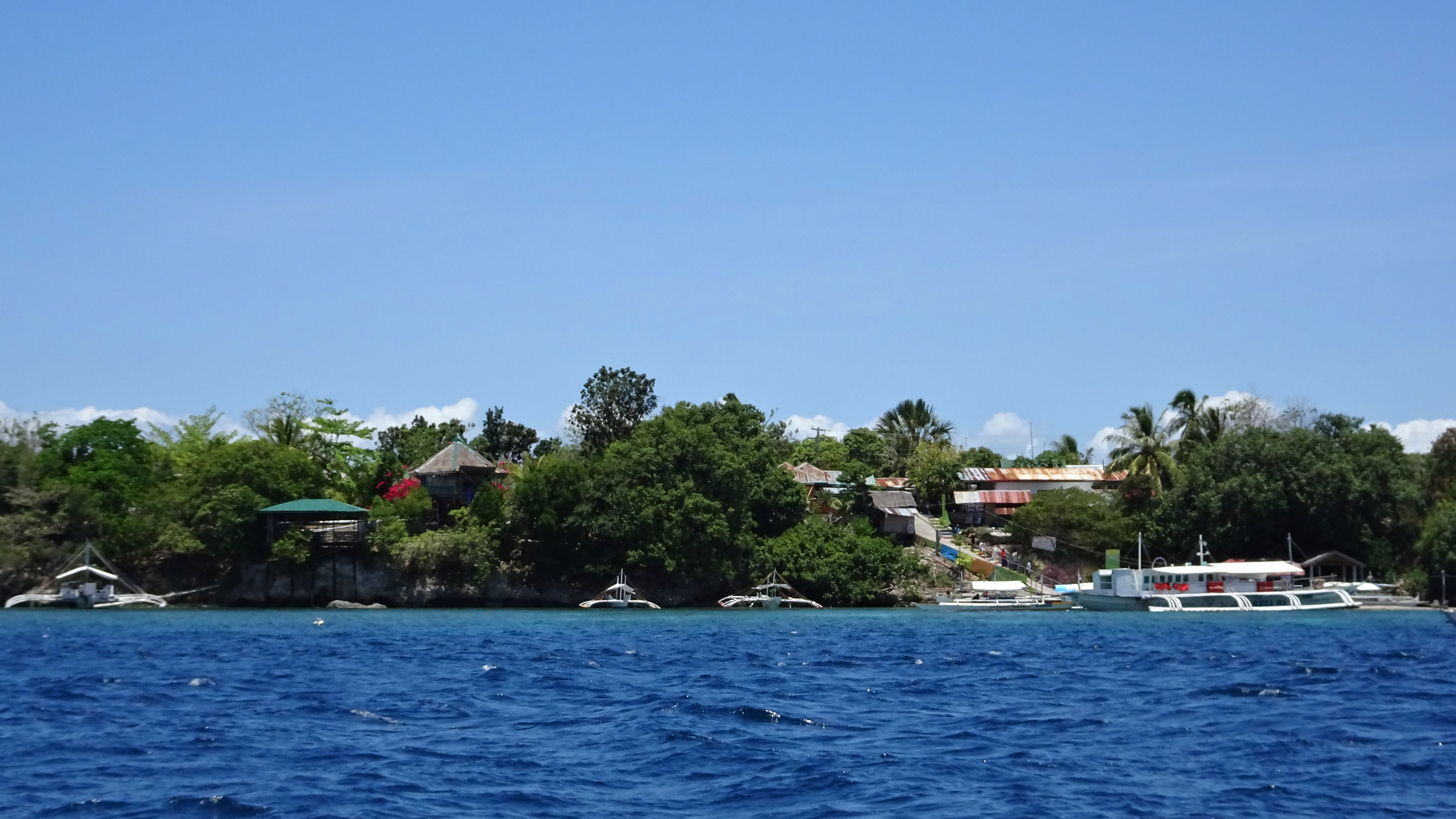
- Cabilao Island
  Loon Coastal Geomorphic Conservation Park (417-hectare [1,030-acre] intertidal zone uplifted as a result of the 2013 earthquake)
- Loon Macaques: a mainstream tourist destination featuring the crab-eating mangrove monkeys (Cantomocad)
- Cabilao Island
  - Dive sites
  - Cabilao Island Lake
  - Green Footprint Lagoon
  - Cabacungan Fish Sanctuary
- Tubig-Loon Spring Park
- White beaches and sand bars (Cabilao and Sandingan Islands)
- Mangrove gardens (Tangnan, Pig-ot, Basdacu, Napo, Cogon Norte, Basac, Tajang Causeway, Sandingan)
- Caves (Cantam-is Baslay and many upland barangays)
- Mount Canmanoc
- Mount Tan-awan: highest point of Loon
- Moalong River and Antaeg Spring and Lagoon
- Piong and Kabantian Falls
- Danicop Ticugan Springs
- Endemic animals: hammerhead shark, pygmy seahorse, monkeys, exotic birds, "mamag" (tarsier), "kagwang" (a lemur-like gliding mammal), "tinggawong" (bearcat)

== Infrastructure ==
Tagbilaran North Road, Noto Norte

=== Transportation ===
Road network:

- national - 24.0 kilometres (14.9 mi)
- provincial - 12.8 kilometres (8.0 mi)
- municipal - 8.0 kilometres (5.0 mi)
- barangay - 145.0 kilometres (90.1 mi)

=== Health and safety ===
- one provincial district hospital (Cong. Natalio P. Castillo, Sr. Memorial Hospital)
- two Rural Health Units
- 14 Barangay Health Stations
- two private dental clinics
- three private medical clinics
- one LGU emergency response unit ("Alagad" Center)
- Lying-in / Birthing Centers, including IMAP Lying-in Centers
- Public security: one PNP station; 704th Regional Public Safety Battalion (Catagbacan Norte)

=== Utilities ===
Water is made available to more than 42 barangays principally by the Loon Waterworks System, which has about 3,000 active individual water service connections reaching the northernmost barangay of Pondol, the southernmost barangay of Song-on, all barangays on Sandingan Island, and many hinterland barangays. The rest of the upland barangays are served by Level II communal water systems.

The abundance of water in Loon has also encouraged investors to establish water-refilling stations in the town.

== Education ==
- Public educational institutions: Loon North District - 12 elementary schools; 8 primary schools; Six secondary schools: Cabilao National High School, Sandingan National High School, Gov. Jacinto Borja National High School (formerly Cantaongon High School), Lopez Dano Simbajon High School, Loon North High School and Loon Northeast High School
- Public educational institutions: Loon South District - 10 elementary schools; 9 primary schools; 2 secondary schools: Loon South National High School and Loon East High School
- Private secondary schools: UB–Loon Institute, Sacred Heart Academy, and Saint Teresa Academy
- Preparatory schools: 64 public preparatory schools (day-care centers), National Child Development Center, UB Loon Institute Learning Center, Trinitas Learning Center and Carmelite Learning Center of Tontonan, Loon, Bohol, Inc.

== Notable people ==
- Vivoree, singer, actress
- Justino Relampagos Romea, composer, poet, columnist
