= Loon Church =

Roman Catholic church in Bohol, Philippines

- Nuestra Señora de la Luz Parish Church; Our Lady of Light Parish Church
- Iglesia Parroquial de Nuestra Señora de la Luz (Spanish)
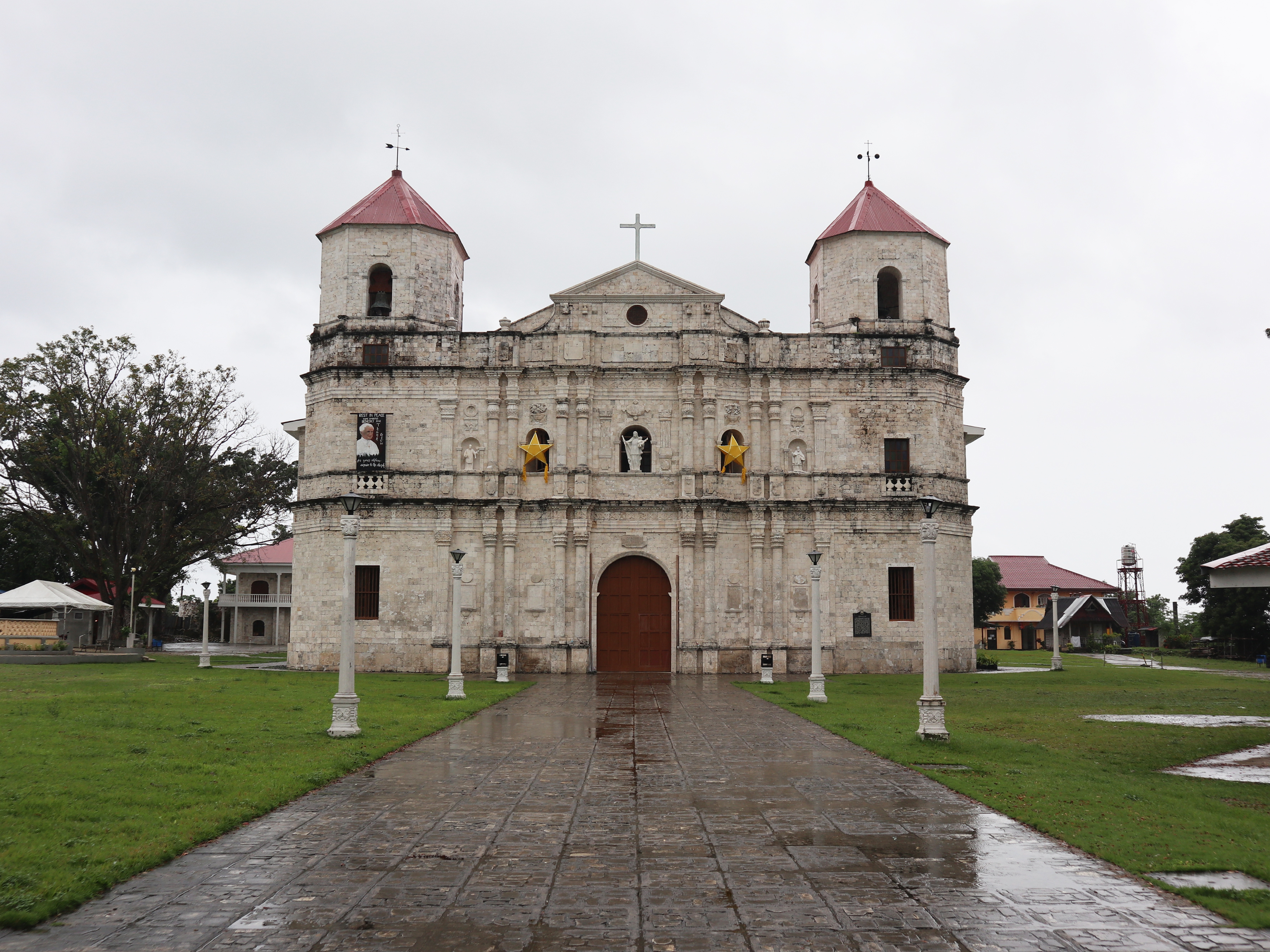
- The church in January 2023, post-restoration

- Location in the Visayas Location in the Philippines
- 9°47′56″N 123°47′33″E
- Location: Poblacion, Loon, Bohol
- Country: Philippines
- Denomination: Roman Catholic

History
- Status: Diocesan Shrine
- Founded: June 22, 1753
- Dedication: Our Lady of Light
- Consecrated: 1864

Architecture
- Functional status: Active
- Heritage designation: National Cultural Treasure
- Designated: December 6, 2010
- Architect: Domingo de Escondrillas
- Architectural type: Church building
- Style: Baroque
- Years built: 1855–1864 (dst. 2013); c. late 2010s–2021
- Completed: September 7, 2021

Specifications
- Materials: Coral stones

Administration
- Province: Cebu
- Diocese: Tagbilaran
- Deanery: Our Lady of Light
- Parish: Our Lady of Light

Clergy
- Priest: Rev. Fr. Desiderio Magdoza

The Nuestra Señora de la Luz Parish Church, also known as Our Lady of Light Parish Church and commonly as Loon Church, is a Roman Catholic parish church in the municipality of Loon, Bohol, Philippines, under the Diocese of Tagbilaran. The parish was established by the Jesuits in 1753 and the original stone church was built from 1855 to 1864. It was declared as a National Historical Landmark by the National Historical Commission of the Philippines and a National Cultural Treasure by the National Museum of the Philippines.

The entire church building and convent were destroyed by a 7.2 magnitude earthquake which struck Bohol and other parts of Central Visayas on October 15, 2013. Loon Church completed its restoration on September 7, 2021. The National Historic Commission successfully turned over the church to the Diocese of Tagbilaran after an eight-year restoration period.

== History ==
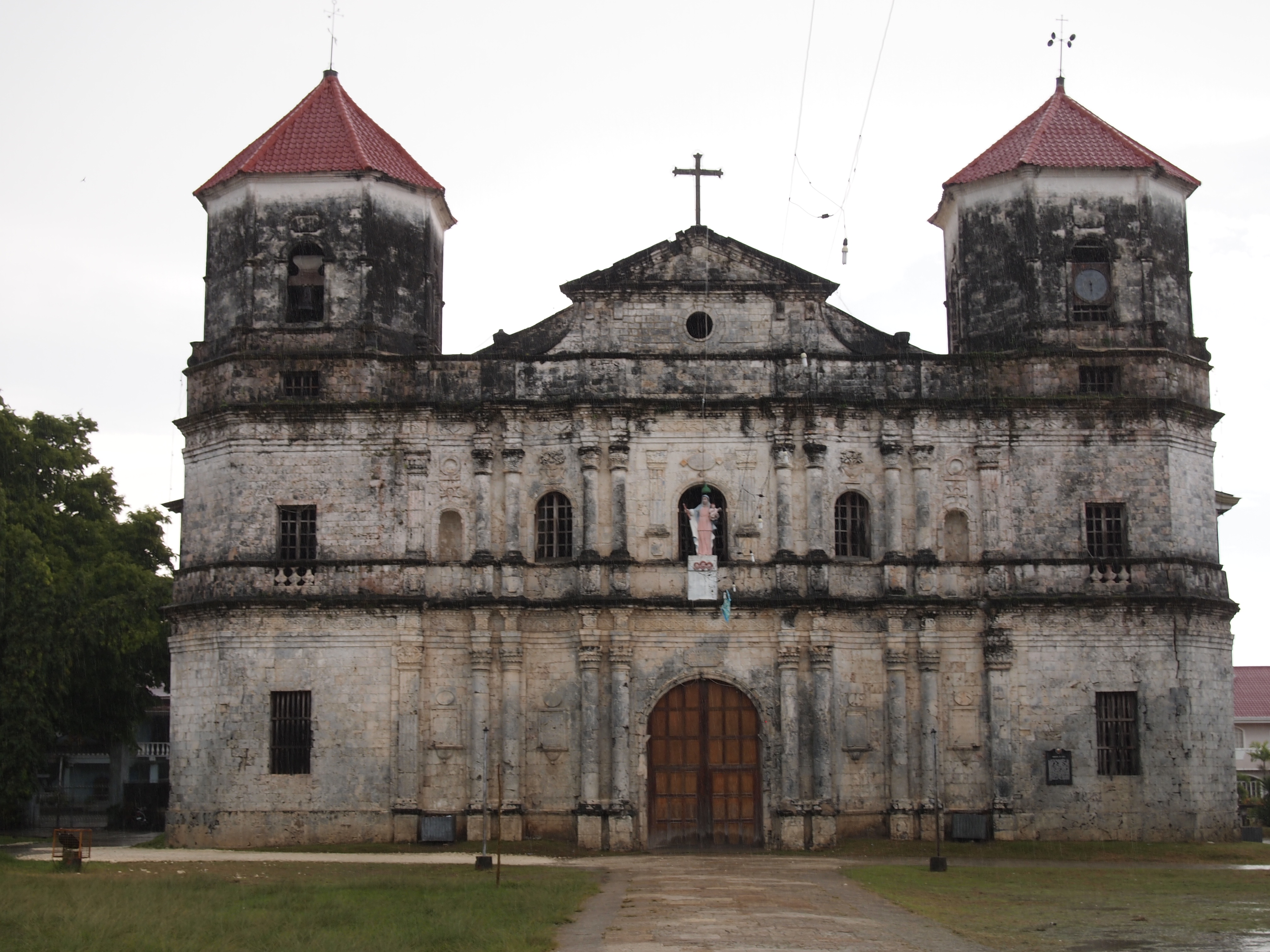
Church facade prior to the 2013 earthquake

The Jesuits established the parish of Loon on June 22, 1753. It is believed that the first Jesuit church was located in the downtown area called Napo, the town's former center along the sea. The town center, including the church, eventually moved to the upper portion of the town, called Moto, due to pirate raids.

The church complex was built with defensive stone walls and was armed with a cannon in the 1770s. Moto and Napo were connected by a stairway with 174 stone steps built under the term of Father Antonio Yus. The church and convent were rebuilt in the 1780s, and again in 1815. However, it was destroyed by fire in 1850 and 1853.

Father Jose Garcia planned the construction of another church, and commissioned Domingo de Escondrillas, Director of Public Works in Cebu, to design it. The construction of the church through forced labor started in 1855 and finished in 1864.

When the Jesuits were expelled from the country in 1868, the Augustinian Recollects continued to evangelize in the area until 1898. The church was used as a garrison by American soldiers in 1901.

Loon was the mother parish of the parishes of Sandingan, Catagbacan, and Cabilao Island when the latter churches were canonically erected in 1961, 1988, and 1990 respectively.

=== Historical and cultural declarations ===
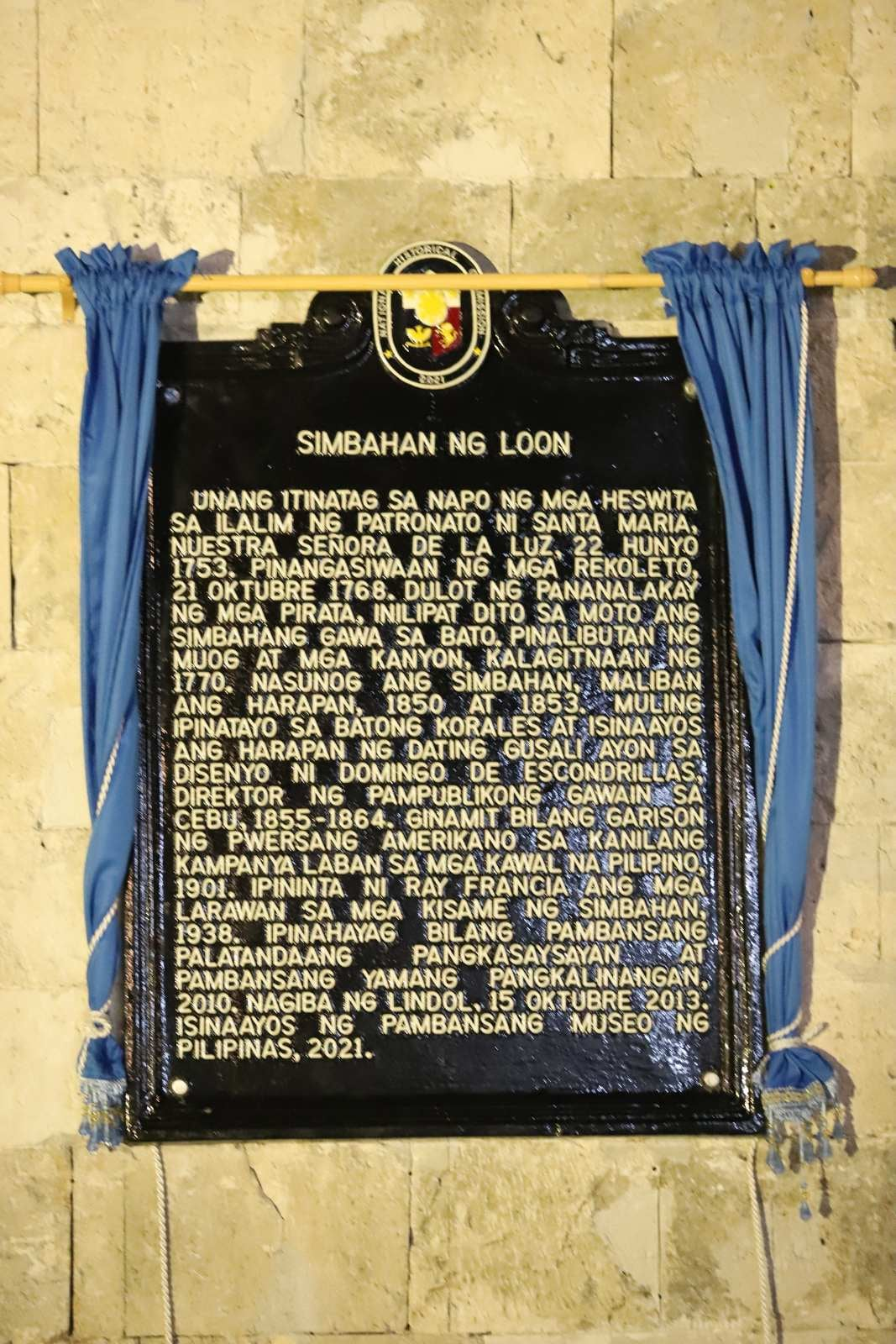
Church NHC historical marker

On December 6, 2010, Loon Church was declared a National Cultural Treasure by the National Museum of the Philippines. The church was also declared as a National Historical Landmark in the same year by the National Historical Commission of the Philippines.

=== 2013 earthquake and restoration ===
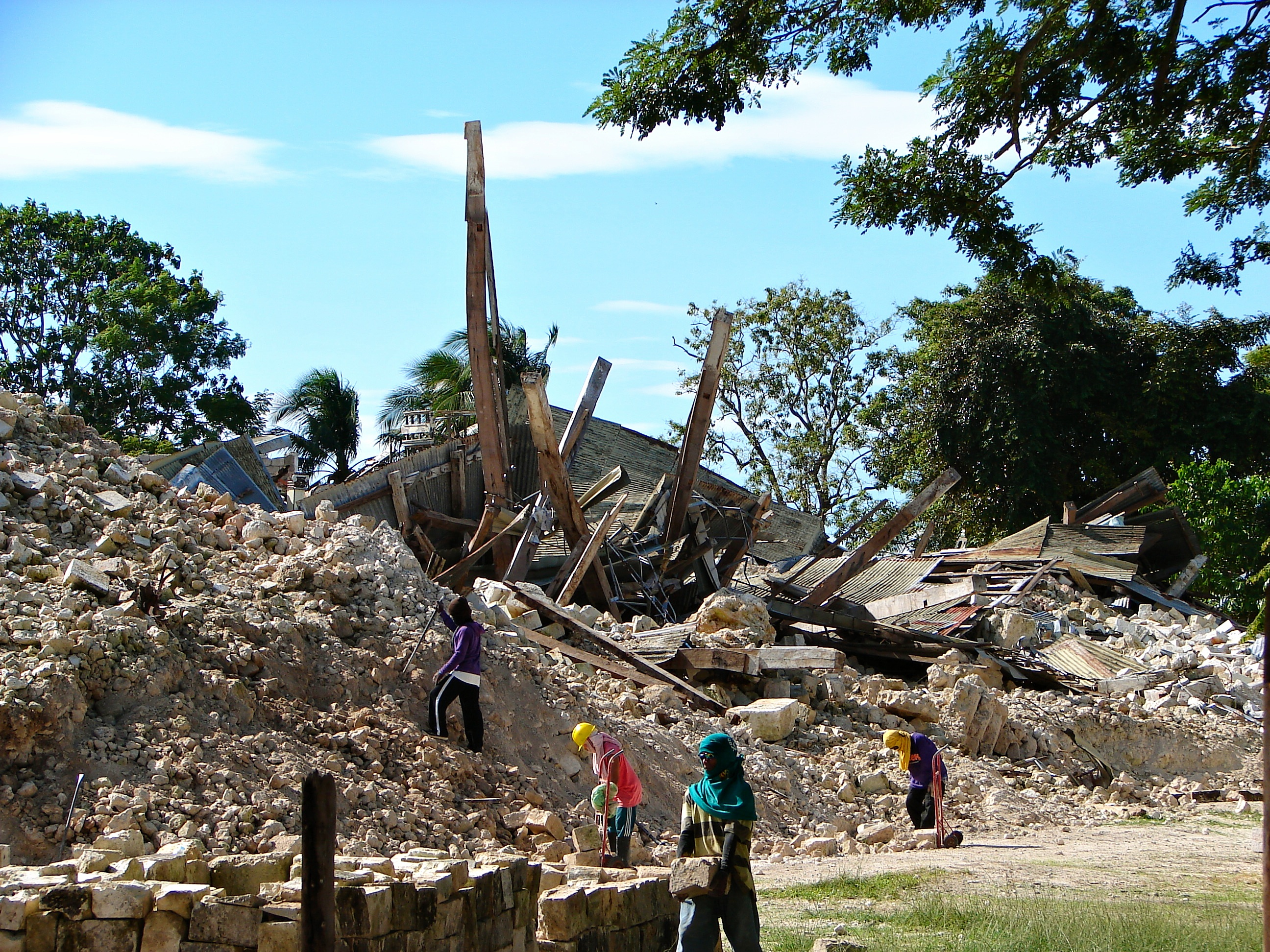
The rubble of Loon Church

On October 15, 2013, a strong earthquake hit Bohol, causing several Spanish colonial churches to be severely damaged, including Loon Church. The church and convent of Loon had totally collapsed and were reduced to rubble.

A restoration of the church and convent was undertaken, and was completed on September 7, 2021. The National Historic Commission successfully turned over the church to the Diocese of Tagbilaran after the eight-year restoration period.

On September 8, 2023, the church was proclaimed a Diocesan Shrine.

== Characteristics ==
The church formed a wide rectangular plan with an internal transept and a crossing surmounted by a quadrangular pyramid. At each side of the transept was a buttress. Unlike the churches of Loboc and Baclayon, it did not have a portico façade.

=== Façade ===
The façade was the only surviving part of the burned church in the 1850s. It had several inscriptions which included an address to Queen Isabel and Governor General Narciso Claveria and a prayer to the Virgin Mary.

There was a statue on the façade of the Nuestra Señora del Cetro (Our Lady of the Scepter), a patroness of Loon. It also had twin octagonal bell towers, the right of which had a clock installed in 1921.

=== Interiors ===
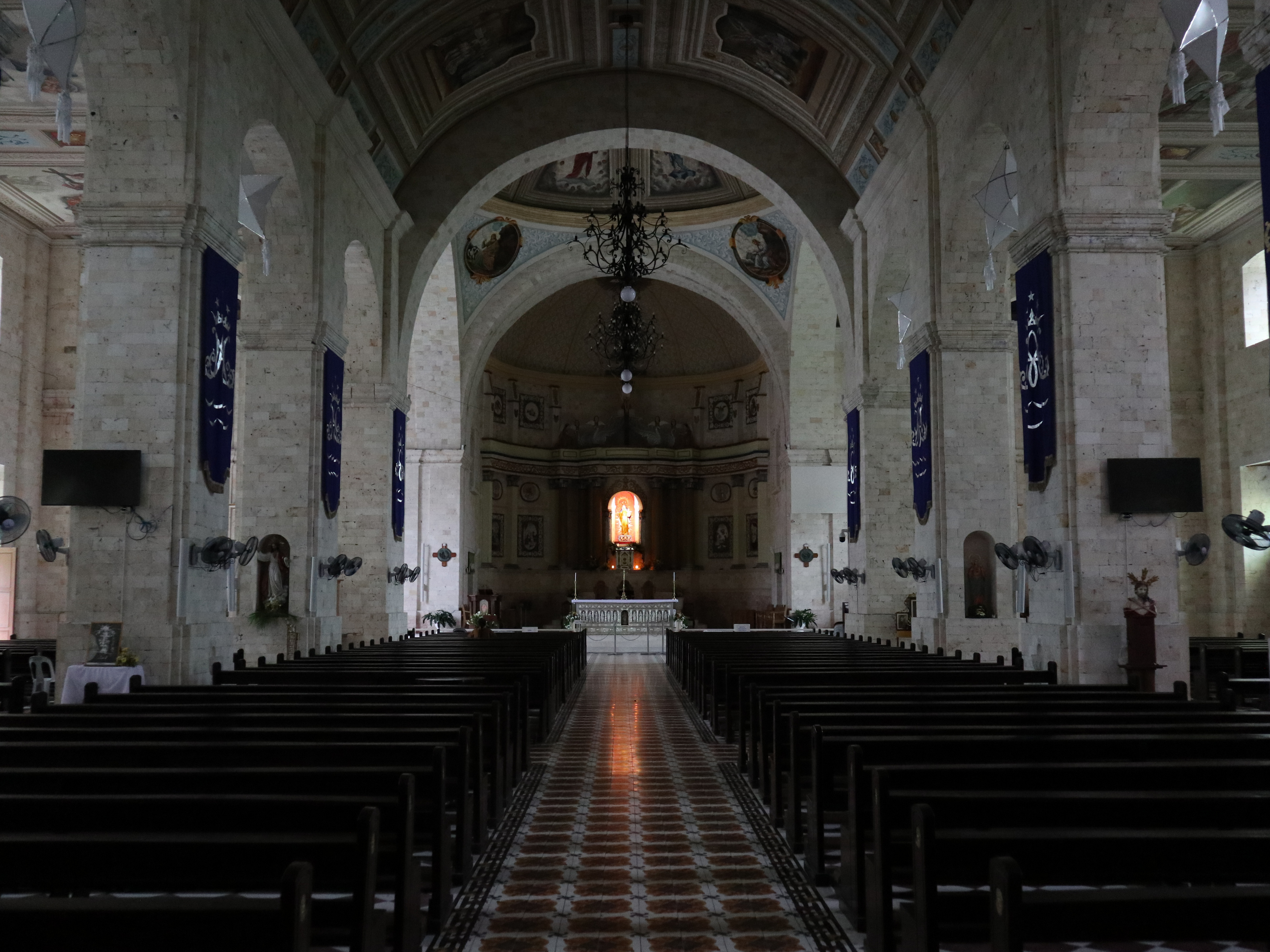
Nave of the church in 2023

Inside the church, the narthex had azulejo flooring and a ceiling painting known as "The Entry into Jerusalem". The baptistry and a wooden stairway to the choir loft and bell tower were located on the left and right sides of the narthex respectively. Connecting the narthex and the nave are the pilasters in the arcade. Adorning the church are paintings on its ceiling and walls, with garlands and medallions on its arches and pillars. Traces of paintings of yellow flowers on a blue background are credited to folk artists while murals in the ceilings are by Ray Francia. One of Francia's works is the painting of "Finding of Jesus in the Temple" in the epistle transept.

=== Altar ===
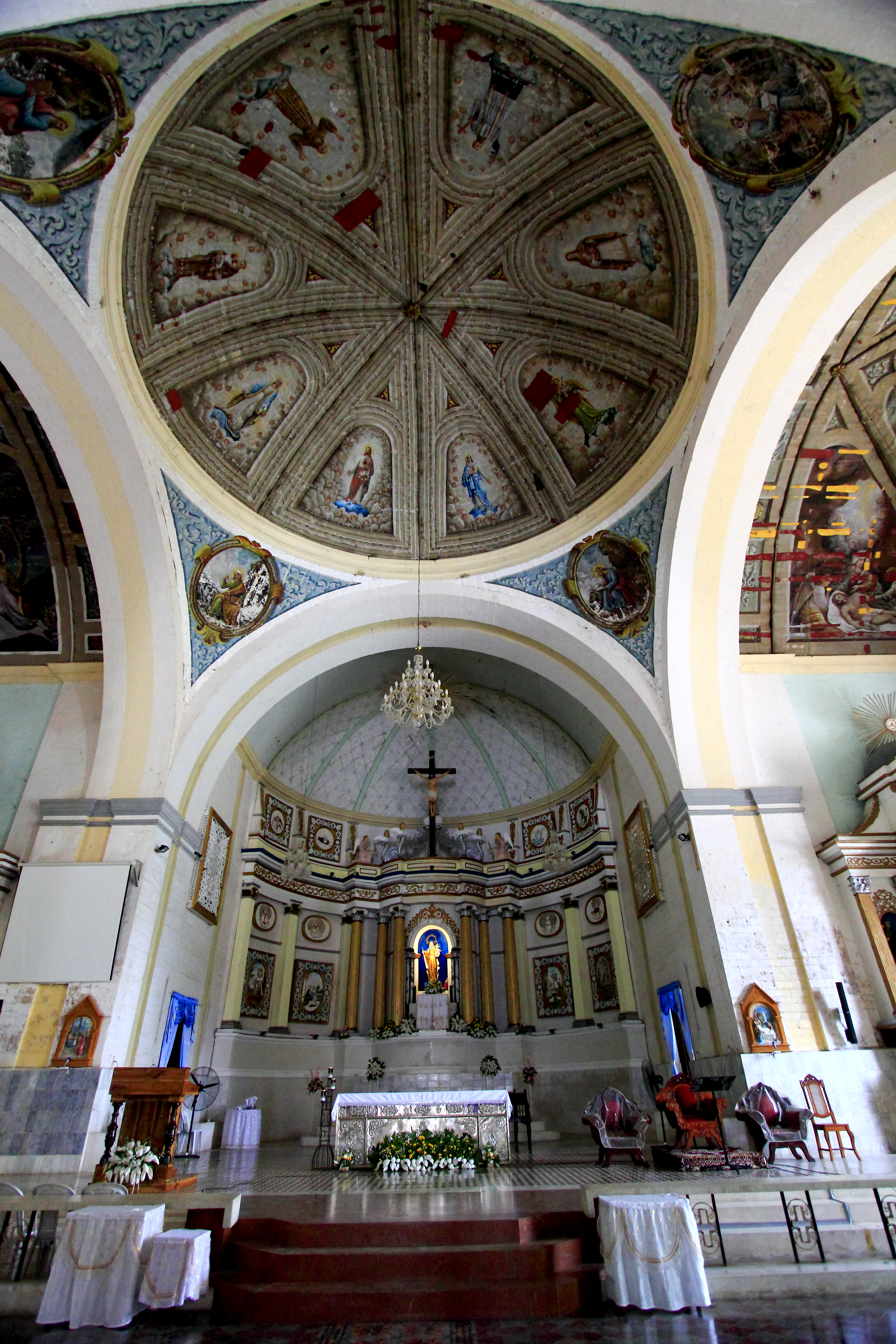
Sanctuary and main altar

There were three neogothic altars in Loon. Located in the sanctuary is the carved main altar which houses the image of the patroness, Nuestra Señora de la Luz, in the central niche. Just like the image of the façade, the statue is not the usual icon of the Virgin Mary but is nearer to the image of the Nuestra Señora del Cetro. The altar, which forms a baldachin, was designed with icons related to Mary, including four bas-reliefs on Mary's Annunciation, Visitation, Nativity of Jesus, and Presentation of Jesus at the Temple; icons from the Litany of Loreto such as the Spiritual Vessel, Mystical Rose, Tower of David, and the Tower of Ivory; and symbols of the Four Evangelists.

The gospel altar (left side) houses the image of St. Joseph and the Child Jesus and Saint Roch. On the epistle altar (right side) are niches that used to house the stolen image of Nuestra Señora de la Consolacion and the images of Saint Augustine and Saint Nicholas Tolentino.

=== Sacristies and Convent ===
On each side of the sanctuary are two separate sacristies. The sacristy on the left side serves as the parish office, while the sacristy on the right serves as a storage for church paraphernalia. It is connected to the convent through an apse leading to the upper gallery of the sacristy.

The convent at the back of the church is now used as the building of a school, the Sacred Heart Academy. It was built from 1844 to 1846 under the term of Father Pedro Polo.

=== Choir loft ===
The choir loft can be accessed through wooden stairs from the narthex. At the right side of the loft is a large pipe organ. The bell tower can be accessed on either side of the choir loft. It has six bells, all with unusual raised images of the saints to which the bell are dedicated, five of which are dated 1867.

=== Mortuary Chapel and Cemetery ===
An octagonal mortuary chapel built during the middle of the 19th century is located in front of the church. It is now being used as a meeting hall. On its right is a road linked to the old cemetery (Cementerio de Mamposteria), which is now the Municipal Nursery.

== Bibliography ==
- Jose, Regalado Trota (2001). Visita Iglesia Bohol (A Guide to Historic Churches). Manila: National Commission for Culture and the Arts. pp. 75–80. ISBN 9718140166.
