= Bayong =

Filipino traditional bag

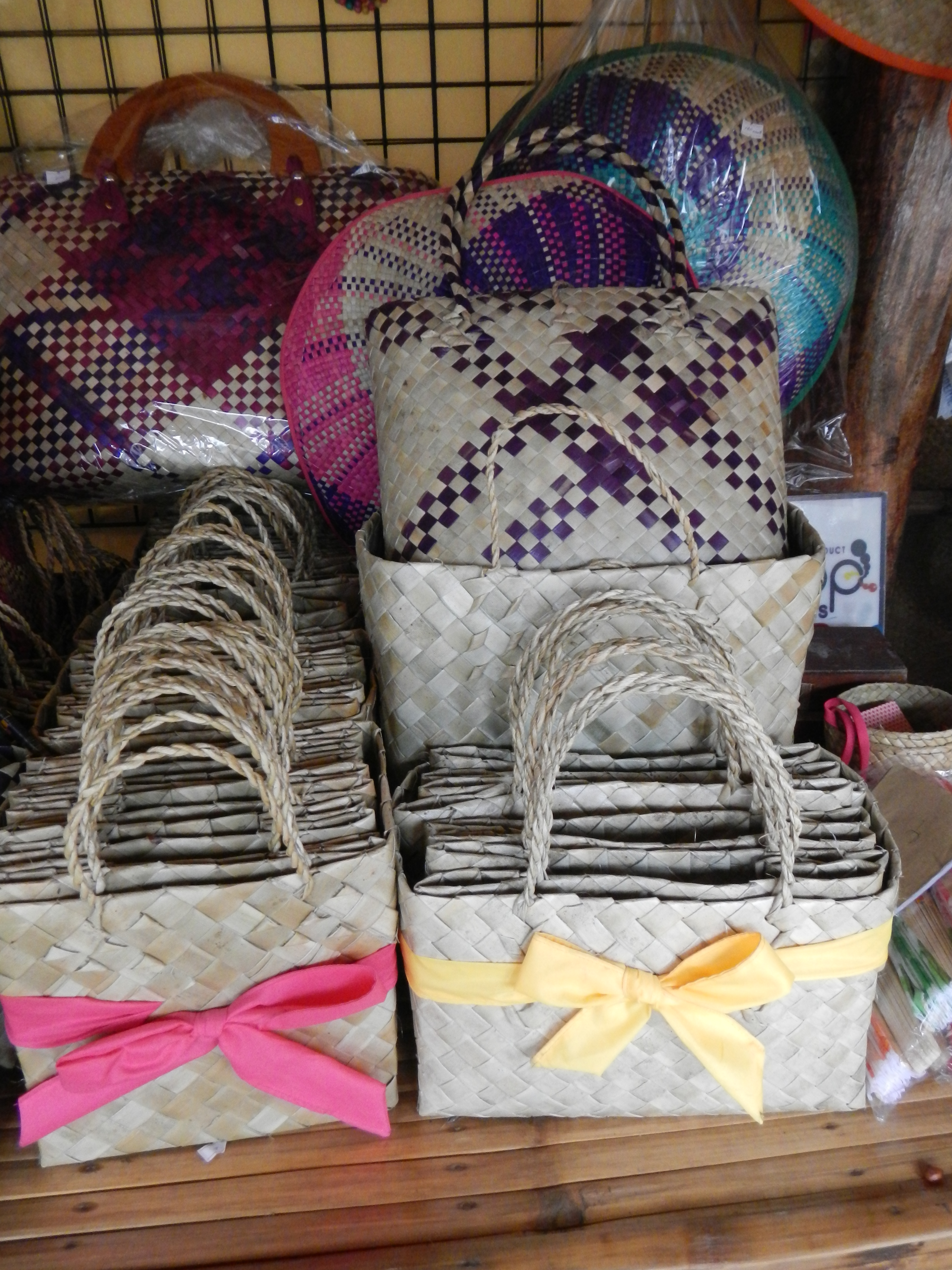
Bayongs for sale seen in a local shop

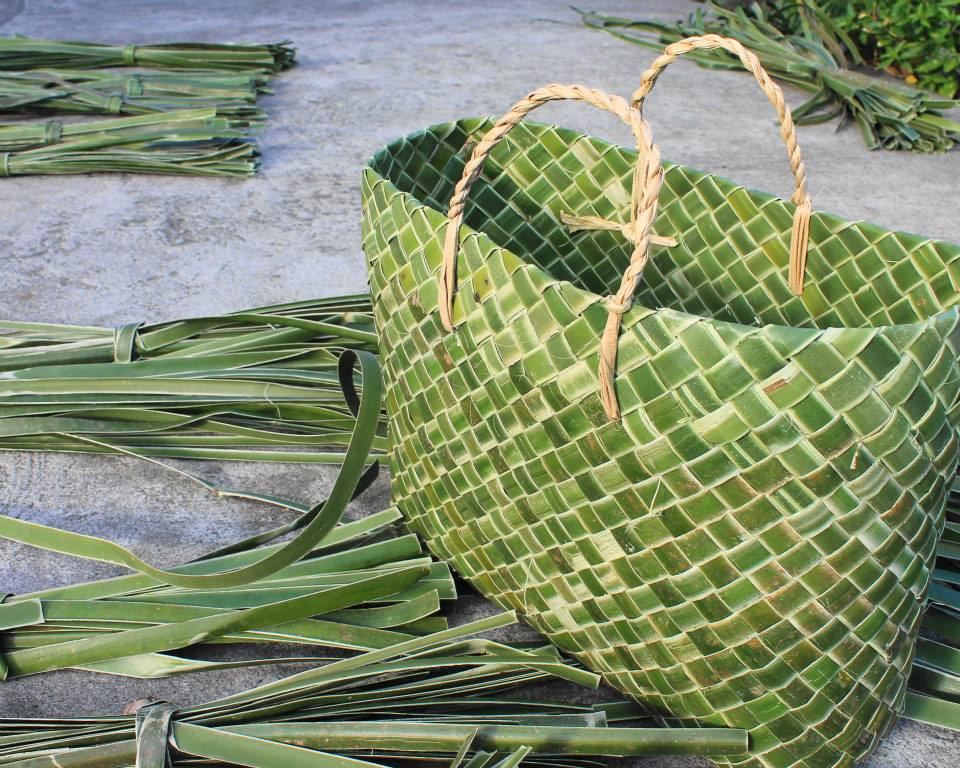
Bayong made from karagumoy

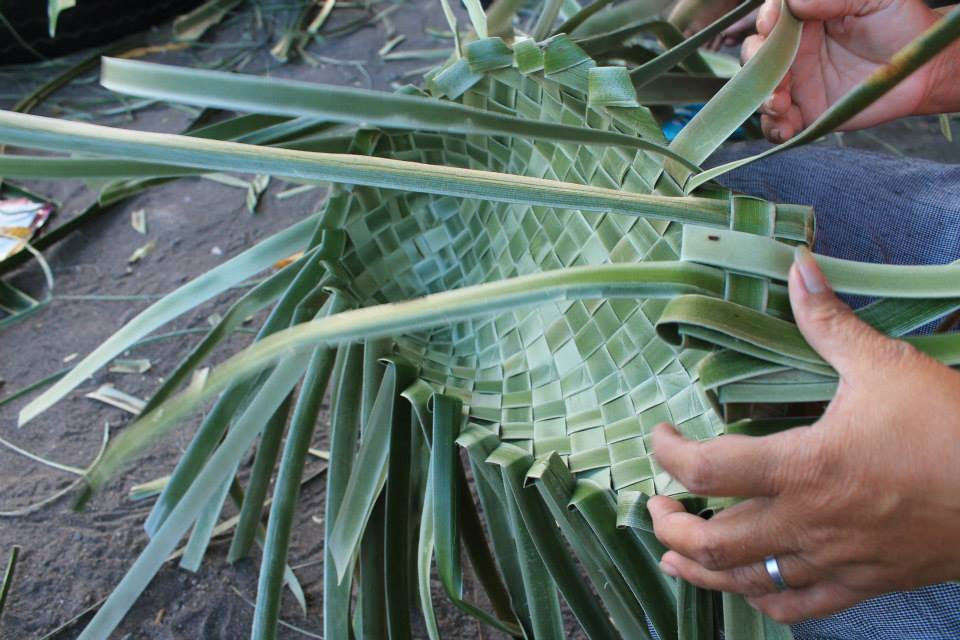
The weaving process in making bayong

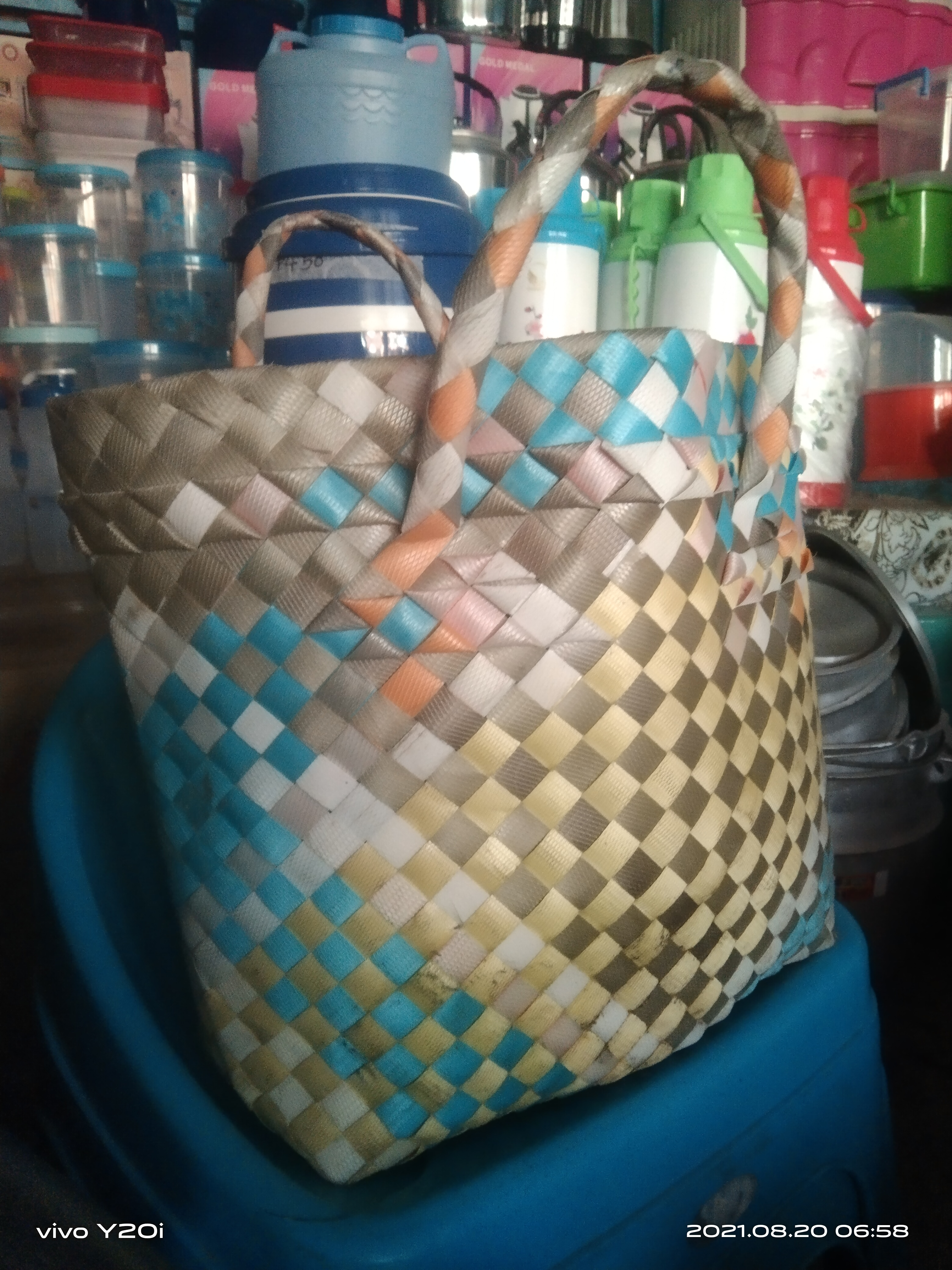
Bayong

A bayong is a type of bag from the Philippines made by weaving dried leaves, usually from buri in the Visayas and pandan in Luzon. It is also made using native Philippine plants such as abaca, bacbac, karagumoy, sabutan, romblon and tikog. Plastic strips are also used as synthetic substitute for leaves.

The bayong is commonly used by Filipinos going to wet markets especially in rural areas or provinces. Recently, the bayong is being promoted as an environmentally-friendly alternative to plastic shopping bags.

The bayong has long been a part of Filipino culture and tradition. Its production and use has been passed down from generation to generation, and it has become part of the daily life of the locals.

== Other designs ==
Some parts of the Philippines such as Mindanao traditionally use a plastic version or twine.
